= 2008 in organized crime =

== Events ==
=== January ===
- January 15 – Italian police defeat a Nigerian criminal gang involved in human trafficking, sex trafficking and the illegal drug trade.
- January 16 – Police arrest 39 Mafia suspects in Palermo, Sicily, including the son of mafia boss Salvatore Lo Piccolo.
- January 18 – Sicilian president Salvatore Cuffaro is found guilty on several mafia-related charges.
- January 21 – Mexican security forces capture drug lord Alfredo Beltrán Leyva
- January 24 – Russian mafia boss Semion Mogilevich is arrested on charges of tax evasion.
- January 31 – Chechen mafia boss Movladi Atlangeriyev is abducted as he leaves a Moscow restaurant.

=== February ===
- February 1 – Norte del Valle cartel leader Wilber Varela is found murdered in a holiday cabin in Mérida, Venezuela.
- February 4 – Irish mobster Paddy Doyle is shot dead in Estepona, Spain, by Russian mafia hitmen.
- February 7 – Operation Old Bridge leads to scores of arrests in the United States and Italy. The leaders of the Gambino crime family were indicted and charged with RICO offenses, including acting boss John "Jackie Nose" D'Amico, underboss Domenico "Dom from the 18th Avenue" Cefalu, consigliere Joseph "JoJo" Corozzo, captains Nicholas "Little Nicky" Corozzo, Leonard DiMaria, Thomas "Tommy Sneakers" Cacciopoli, and Frank Cali, as well as over 50 other Gambino soldiers and associates. Joseph "Joe V/Joe Andrews" Vollaro was instrumental in indicting the mobsters, as a close associate of Nicky Corozzo, Vollaro who owned several trucking businesses in Staten Island, wore a wire during extortions and meetings with Corozzo and others. The New York Attorney General's office flipped Vollaro after he was caught with two kilos of cocaine. At the time of the indictment, Corozzo was planning on proposing Vollaro for induction into the family. In addition to the labor and extortion charges, Nicky Corozzo is charged with ordering the slayings of two drug dealers, and family soldier Charles Carneglia is charged with committing five murders dating back to the 1970s. Nicky Corozzo was tipped off by his daughter who is married to another Gambino soldier, and managed to flee before the federal agents raided his home down the street from hers.
- February 12 – A Sicilian bishop is given police protection after refusing to take part in the funeral of mafia boss Crocefisso Emanuello.
- February 13 – Sicilian Mafia boss Michele Greco died in Rome. Greco was the boss of the Greco Mafia clan and was the leader of the Sicilian Mafia Commission.
- February 13 – Police raids in and around London arrest 22 people in connection with a cocaine trafficking operation estimated to be worth £100 million.
- February 19 – High ranking 'Ndrangheta boss Pasquale Condello, who had been on the run since 1987, is arrested in Italy.
- February 28 – The Dojin-kai's splinter organization Kyushu Seido-kai was officially registered as a designated boryokudan group under the Organized Crime Countermeasures Law.

=== March ===
- March 6 – Police in Thailand arrest top Russian arms dealer Viktor Bout at a luxury hotel.
- March 7 – Police in Sydney break up an international Korean-based sex trafficking syndicate.
- March 13 – Drug lord Gustavo Rivera Martinez is captured by Mexican authorities in Tijuana.
- March 20 – The police have detained the biggest lot of heroin in Moldova. The matter is of 200 kg of heroin from Afghanistan worth about 10 million euros. Drugs were designed for one of the European countries, they were of the Afghan origin and packed in Turkey. Several days later, the General Prosecutor's Office announced that Chief of the Operative Services of the Ministry of Interior Corneliu Savca and two of his subordinates were arrested on the suspicion of being involved in this drug trafficking. It was envisaged that the policemen had had to provide for the transit of drugs, hidden in sacks with French beans in a microbus. After this the press spread rumors that ex-Minister of Interior Gheorghe Papuc was involved in this case, however, the General Prosecutor's Office denied these rumors.
- March 22 – 'Ndrangheta boss Luca Megna is shot dead, his wife injured and his five-year-old daughter is put in a coma after an attack.
- March 27 – Mobster Giuseppe Cavallo is shot dead in a retribution attack.
- March 28 – Francesco Capicchiano is killed by two gunmen, amidst fears of a gang war.
- March 29 – English Mob Boss Anthony "The British Bulldog" Burnes is shot dead outside a pub in Liverpool.

=== April ===
- April 7 – Bulgarian organised crime author Georgi Stoev is killed by a single shot to the head in the capital Sofia.
- April 25 – Moroccan drug lord Mohamed Ouazzani is recaptured by Spanish police after escaping prison last year.
- April 27 – 15 people are killed in a gun battle between the Arellano-Felix cartel and a rival gang.

=== May ===
- May 8 to May 10 – Three prominent Mexican officials (Édgar Eusebio Millán Gómez, Juan Antonio Roman Garcia, Esteban Robles Espinosa) are gunned down by drug traffickers.
- May 23 – Italian Police arrest Ndrangheta boss, Giuseppe Nirta, in San Luca
- May 26 – Raids in Caserta lead to the arrests of 50 alleged Camorra gangsters, targeting the Iovine clan.
- May 28 – Seven policemen are killed and four injured in a drugs raid in Culiacán.
- May 29 – Nicholas Corozzo, boss of the Gambino crime family, turned himself in to Federal authorities after almost four months on the run.
- May 31 – The United States announces it is using a drug trafficking law to impose financial sanctions on the PKK, 'Ndrangheta and a Mexican drugs cartel as well as individuals from Turkey, Afghanistan and Venezuela.

=== June ===
- June 4 – Nine members of the Colombo crime family, including acting boss, Thomas Gioeli, and underboss John Franzese were arrested for federal racketeering charges.
- June 13 – Spanish police arrest 20 members of the Tambov organized crime group in Madrid, the Balearic Islands and the coastal resorts of Málaga and Marbella.
- June 14 – Italian anti-corruption activist Giuseppe Basile is stabbed to death outside his home in Apulia.
- June 26 – Mexican police commander Igor Labastida is shot dead in a restaurant.

=== July ===
- July 1 – Hideo Mizoshita, the third president of the Kudo-kai, a yakuza organization based in Kitakyushu, Japan, died at the age of 61.

=== August ===
- August 5 – former Gambino crime family acting boss John Gotti, Jr. is charged with conspiracy connected to cocaine trafficking and three murders.
- August 7 – Italian police arrest Paolo Nirta, the head of the Nirta-Strangio 'Ndrangheta clan.
- August 18 – Acting boss Gambino boss John D'Amico sentenced to two years
- August 20 – 'Ndrangheta boss Giuseppe Coluccio is extradited from Canada to Rome.
- August 22 – Dominick Cirillo, consigliere of the Genovese Crime Family, was released from prison.
- August 27 – Mexican police find three headless bodies in a rubbish dump in Tijuana killed by drug cartels.

=== September ===
- September 5 – Spanish police arrest Colombian drug lord Edgar Guillermo Vallejo-Guarin at a luxury hotel in Madrid.
- September 17 – Over 200 people across Mexico, Guatemala, Italy and the United States, including members of the Gulf cartel and the 'Ndrangheta are arrested in a major anti-drug trafficking operation, Operation Solare.
- September 18 – 'Ndrangheta boss Francesco Pelle, linked to the long-running San Luca feud, is arrested in Pavia.
- September 18 – former NYPD officers Louis Eppolito and Stephen Caracappa's convictions reinstated by Appeals Court
- September 18 – Leading figures in the Montreal Mafia, including Nicolo Rizzuto, Rocco Sollecito, Paolo Renda, Francesco Arcadi, Francesco Del Balso and Lorenzo Giordano, pleaded guilty Thursday morning to charges of conspiracy to traffic drugs, extort, run illegal bookmaking and possess illegal goods.
- September 18 – 6 African immigrants are shot in what is believed to be a dispute between immigrant African drug gangs and the Casalesi clan of the Camorra in Castelvolturno This event begins to get labelled the Castel Volturno massacre by the media and public. This is followed by a riot the next day.
- September 19 – Mexican police seize $26m in drug money in Culiacán.
- September 20 – Frank Valenti, boss of the Rochester crime family in the 1960s and 1970s died at the age of 97.
- September 22 – Arms dealer Viktor Bout's trial begins in Bangkok.
- September 22 – Police arrest Camorra member Alfonso Cesarano in connection with the shooting of the African immigrants in Castelvolturno. The government also announce they are deploying 500 troops in the area.
- September 29 – A prisoner with ties to organized crime is shot dead by a sniper outside the prison in Varces, France.
- September 29 – Anti-Mafia police seized apartments, businesses and property belonging to Giuseppe Setola, boss of the Casalesi clan, of the Camorra.

=== October ===
- October 3 – Vincent Artuso, Capo of the Gambino Crime Family, was convicted of RICO conspiracy, mail fraud, wire fraud, and money laundering charges in Palm Beach, Florida.
- October 13 – Frank Rosenthal, former Chicago Outfit bookmaker, died.
- October 16 – Nicolo Rizzuto, boss of the Montreal Mafia, or the Rizzuto Crime Family, was freed today and sentenced to 3 years probation. Francesco Del Balso, 38, and Francesco Arcadi, 55 – were each sentenced to a 15-year prison term and will serve 11 years due to time served.
- October 22 – Police capture Mexican cartel boss Jesus Zambada of the Sinaloa cartel after a shootout in Mexico City.
- October 24 – Mexican criminal investigator Andres Dimitriadis is shot dead by drug traffickers in his car on his way home.
- October 26 – Colombian police seize a shipment of cocaine worth $200m en route to Mexico.
- October 26 – The Mexican army captures drug lord Eduardo Arellano Felix after a shootout in Tijuana.

=== November ===
- November 2 – Senior Mexican police officer, Victor Gerardo Garay, resigns amidst claims one of his aides was on the payroll of the Sinaloa cartel.
- November 2 – Michael "Mikey Cigars" Coppola, a capo in the Genovese crime family, was indicted on the 1977 murder of John "Johnny Coca-Cola" Lardiere.
- November 4 – 88 gangsters are arrested in raids targeting the Camorra, including Gemma Donnarumma, wife of Camorra boss Valentino Gionta.
- November 7 – Domenico Magnoli, suspected drug trafficker for the 'Ndrangheta, is arrested after a liposuction sting at the La Madonnina clinic in Cosenza.
- November 17 – Israeli mafia boss Yaakov Alperon is killed in a car bombing.
- November 19 – Mexican Interpol chief Ricardo Gutierrez Vargas is arrested on suspicion of links with drug traffickers.
- November 21 – Noe Ramirez Mandujano, ex-head of Mexico's anti-organized crime agency, is arrested on suspicion of links with drug traffickers.
- November 24 – Eight members of New York's Lucchese crime family, including acting capo, Anthony Croce, on illegal gambling and narcotics charges by the FBI. If convicted, Croce faces up to five years in prison.

=== December ===
- December 8 – Ten suspected drug traffickers and one soldier are killed in a shootout in Guerrero, Mexico, while another six people are killed when fire is opened on a pool hall in Ciudad Juárez.
- December 11 – New York Federal Prosecutors state that Genovese crime family capo Tino Fiumara ordered the killing of former capo Lawrence Ricci. Ricci was killed during his 2005 trial and his body was later found in the trunk of a car at a New Jersey diner.
- December 16 – The Carabinieri arrested nearly 100 people in anti-Mafia raids across the southern island of Sicily and in the central region of Tuscany. The police statement said that Matteo Messina Denaro was organizing a new Cupola to restructure the Sicilian mafia and become its top boss.
- December 16 – Gambino crime family capo, Vincent Artuso who runs the family's South Florida crew was sentenced to nine years in Federal prison. He was convicted of defrauding the security company through real-estate deals in which the Gambino crew bought ADT office buildings far below market value, then leased them back to the company at inflated prices. ADT paid his crew millions of dollars in excess lease payments over a five-year period.
- December 17 – Mafia boss Gaetano Lo Presti is found hanged in his cell following his arrest several hours before.
- December 18 – Angelo Prisco, a reputed capo of the Genovese crime family, has been charged for the 1992 killing of Angelo Sangiulo.
- December 22 – 9 decapitated bodies of eight soldiers and policeman are found in Guerrero, Mexico. The incident is believed to be linked to drug cartels.
- December 29 – Salvatore Scala, former capo of the Gambino crime family, died at Butner Federal Medical Center in North Carolina while serving a six-year sentence for shaking down the owners of a Manhattan strip club.

== Arts and literature ==
- Grand Theft Auto IV (video game)
- Bangkok Dangerous (film)
- Bank Job (film)
- Gomorra (film)
- RocknRolla (film)

== Deaths ==
- January 1 – Salvatore Bonanno "Bill", son to Joseph Bonanno and Bonanno crime family member
- February 1 – Wilber Varela, head of Norte del Valle cartel.
- February 4 – Irish gangster Paddy Doyle.
- March – 'Ndrangheta members Luca Megna, Giuseppe Cavallo and Francesco Capicchiano are all killed in what may be the start of a gang war.
- April 7 – Bulgarian crime writer Georgi Stoev.
- April 27 – 15 people are killed in a gun battle between the Arellano-Felix cartel and a rival gang.
- May 8 to May 10 – Three prominent Mexican officials (Édgar Eusebio Millán Gómez, Juan Antonio Roman Garcia, Esteban Robles Espinosa) are gunned down by drug traffickers.
- May 28 – Seven policemen are killed in a drugs raid in Culiacán.
- June 14 – Italian anti-corruption activist Giuseppe Basile.
- June 26 – Mexican police commander Igor Labastida.
- July 1 – Hideo Mizoshita, the third president of the Kudo-kai.
- September 18 – 6 African immigrants are shot in what is believed to be a dispute between immigrant drug gangs and the Camorra in Castelvolturno.
- September 20 – Frank Valenti, boss of the Rochester crime family in the 1960s and 1970s died at the age of 97.
- September 29 – A prisoner with ties to organized crime is shot dead by a sniper outside the prison in Varces, France.
- October 13 – Chicago Outfit bookmaker and former casino boss, Frank Rosenthal dies
- November 17 – Israeli mafia boss Yaakov Alperon.
- December – Anthony Trentacosta, Gambino crime family Capo
- December 8 – Ten suspected drug traffickers and one soldier are killed in a shootout in Guerrero, Mexico, while another six people are killed when fire is opened on a pool hall in Ciudad Juárez.
- December 17 – Mafia boss Gaetano Lo Presti is found hanged in his cell.
