= Grégory Woolley =

Haitian-born Canadian criminal (1972–2023)

- Born: 26 February 1972; Tabarre, Haiti
- Died: 17 November 2023 (aged 51); Saint-Jean-sur-Richelieu, Quebec, Canada
- Cause of death: Gunshot wounds
- Other names: "Picasso"; "Godfather of the street gangs"
- Occupations: Gangster; outlaw biker
- Spouse: Christelle Huot
- Allegiance: Hells Angels MC; Rockers MC

Grégory "Greg" Woolley (26 February 1972 – 17 November 2023) was a Haitian-born Canadian gangster and outlaw biker associated with the Hells Angels motorcycle club in Montreal. Woolley was the protégé and bodyguard of Maurice "Mom" Boucher, a controversial senior Hells Angels leader who led his chapter in a long and extremely violent gang war against the Rock Machine, in Quebec, from 1994 to 2002. Woolley was known in Montreal as the "parrain des gangs de rue" ("Godfather of the street gangs").

== Criminal career ==
=== Master B ===
Woolley grew up poor in the Saint-Michel neighborhood of Montreal, the child of Haitian immigrants. His parents had fled the poverty of their native land and the tyranny of President-for-life Jean-Claude Duvalier, known to the Haitians as "Baby Doc" to distinguish him from his father, President-for-life Dr. François Duvalier, the "Papa Doc". From his teenage years, Woolley was involved in a street gangs in Saint-Michel. He committed his first known murder at the age of 17 when he killed a rival Haitian-Canadian street gangster, which gave him the nickname of "Picasso".

Woolley was the leader of a street gang known as Master B., who bought drugs from the Hells Angels' Montreal chapter led by Maurice "Mom" Boucher. Despite this background, Woolley was very close to Maurice Boucher and served as a bodyguard. Although the Hells Angels are a whites-only group, Boucher made Woolley a member of the Rockers puppet gang. The journalist Jerry Langton wrote: "He [Boucher] appears to have been right about Woolley, who became a very big earner (he became wealthier, in fact, than many Hells Angels and several Nomads) an enthusiastic intimidator, and a loyal member who never informed on anyone". The Rockers were not like the other Hells Angels puppet gangs like the Evil Ones, the Rowdy Crew, and the Condors, which merely performed the same work as the Hells Angels. The Rockers were exclusively the enforcement arm of the Hells Angels divided into a "baseball team", which committed assaults and arson, and the "football team", which committed murders.

=== The Rockers ===
Woolley served as the bodyguard for Boucher and was the best assassin working for the Angels. Woolley was known as "Picasso" in the Montreal underworld because it was said that he was such an "artist" when it came to killing, having first killed at the age of 17 when he killed another Haitian immigrant and gang member. Woolley was said to have done such an "exquisite" job at carving up his rival that he earned the nickname "Picasso", and he was ultimately made the president of the Rockers by Boucher, becoming the first black man to lead an outlaw biker club in Canada, since Rod McLeod of the long defunct Montreal chapter of the Satan's Choice MC in the 1970s. Francis Boucher joined the Rockers with the aim of following his father into the Hells Angels, which put him under Woolley's authority. Besides for the Hells Angels, Woolley's closest allies were members of the "Young Turk" faction of the Rizzuto crime family, such as Francesco Arcadi, Lorenzo "the Skunk" Giordano, and Francesco "Chit" Del Balso.

On 20 December 1996, Woolley murdered a Rock Machine biker, Pierre Beauchamp, whom he shot and killed when he was using his pager inside of his truck, which was parked on the street. Woolley fled in an automobile with stolen license plates, which he later abandoned to take the Metro. The get-away driver was another Rocker, René "Balloune" Charlebois, whom Woolley was to be closely associate with. Found abandoned near the metro station was the gun used to kill Beauchamp along with a toque, which had some hair samples. Afterwards, Woolley went to a bar to tell several other Rockers that he had just "gotten one" for the Hells Angels. Woolley told another Rocker, Stéphane Sirois, who later turned Crown's evidence, that the orders to kill Beauchamp had come from Boucher, who told him not to take any money from Beauchamp as Boucher did not want Montrealers to think that the murder was a drug deal gone bad.

The Royal Canadian Mounted Police (RCMP) informer within the Rockers, Dany "Dany Boy" Kane, reported to his handlers in February 1997 that the Hells Angels had taken control of almost all of the Rock Machine's former drug markets. Kane further reported that the Hells Angels were set upon taking control of the Rock Machine's last strongholds of Pointe-Saint-Charles, Verdun, Lasalle, Saint-Henri, Lachine, Ville-Émard, and Côte-Saint-Paul. Kane continued that the Rockers had set up a death squad whose principal members were Woolley, Pierre Provencher, Normand Robitaille, Stephen Falls, and Stéphane "Godasse" Gagné. Kane added that the members of the Rockers death squad were to receive 30% of the profits from drug sales once the Hells Angels had taken control of the last Rock Machine drug markets.

On 28 March 1997, the Rocker hitman Aimé "Ace" Simard, acting under Woolley's orders, murdered a Rock Machine biker, Jean-Marc Caissy, as he entered a Montreal arena to play hockey with his friends. After Simard was arrested in April 1997, he turned Crown's evidence and named Woolley as the man who gave him the orders to kill Caissy. Woolley was charged with first-degree murder, but Simard proved to be a poor witness on the stand, and Woolley was acquitted.

Woolley was little known to the public until 1998 when he came to public attention as the chief security officer at a Hells Angels funeral. At the funeral, Woolley was seen giving orders to Francis Boucher. A Montreal police officer stated in 2002: "When you're in a position to boss around Maurice "Mom" Boucher's kid, you're somebody." Although the Hells Angels official policies are not racist, experts say many Hells Angels members are racist, and it is rare for individuals of African heritage to join Hells Angels chapters. Woolley, an Afro-Haitian, was described as a rare instance of an individual with black African heritage to rise to a senior position in the Hells Angels. As a black man, Woolley had no hope of ever being allowed to join the Hells Angels, but he seemed very determined to make a career in the Rockers.

=== The Crack Down Posse ===
When Woolley left the Master B. gang to join the Rockers, his old gang fell apart. Another Haitian immigrant who once belonged to Master B., Beauvoir Jean, founded a new gang, the Bo-Gars (which is Haitian French slang for "handsome boys"). Woolley founded another gang, the Syndicate, likewise made up of young men of a Haitian background to oppose the Bo-Gars. The Bo-Gars waged a propaganda campaign against Woolley that depicted him as an "Uncle Tom" figure serving the "clearly racist Hells Angels". Langton wrote the claims of the Bo-Gars were "true", but "ridiculous" as the Bo-Gars worked for the Rizzuto family and "if either of the groups was more under the thumb of a largely racist white organization, it was the Bo-Gars".

The Bo-Gars decided to rebrand themselves as the Bloods, while the Syndicate along with their puppet gang, the Crack Down Posse, rebranded themselves as the Crips. Unlike the Hells Angels, neither the Bloods nor the Crips of Los Angeles had copyrighted their symbols, and the two Montreal gangs had no connection with the American Bloods and Crips gangs. Langton wrote: "The LA Crips and Bloods were not asked or consulted. In all likelihood, they had no idea that there were Crips and Bloods in Montreal, if they even knew where Montreal was". Woolley, who had often worn red and white clothing (red and white are the colors of the Hells Angels), was now forbidden to wear red (red is the color of the Bloods) and had to wear a blue baseball cap and blue clothing (blue is the color of the Crips). Langton described Woolley as "too smart" to engage in "alleyway beatings". Woolley had the Crack Down Posse serve as a puppet gang for the Montreal Crips. The relationship between the Montreal Crips and the Crack Down Posse was analogous to the relationship between the Hells Angels and the Rockers. The Crack Down Posse operated in the Saint-Michel neighborhood, engaged in robbing dépanneurs (convenience stores) and protection rackets. In 1998, Woolley merged the Crack Down Posse and the Rockers together to form the Syndicate.

In August 1999, a bizarre incident occurred on the streets of Montreal when Woolley was riding his Harley-Davidson motorcycle while wearing his Rocker patch on his vest and was pulled over for speeding. The constable who pulled over Wooley, Michel Bureau, claimed he was frightened when he noticed that Woolley had something under his vest, saying that knew Woolley was an especially violent man as he was the only black outlaw biker in Montreal. Constable Bureau offered to drop the speeding fine if Woolley would show him what was under his vest. When Woolley refused, Constable Bureau said it didn't matter if Woolley was carrying drugs, he was willing to drop the charges just as long as Woolley showed him what was under his vest. When Woolley informed Bureau that he was not under arrest, and that it was none of his business what he had under his vest, Bureau called for back-up and thus it took five officers to arrest Woolley for speeding. No guns or drugs were found on Woolley, although a handgun was found lying on the streets close to the arrest scene, which Woolley's lawyers claimed was planted by the police. Later, the judge threw out all of the charges, ruling that this was not a routine police stop, and suggested it was an unusually clumsy attempt on the part of the police to entrap Woolley. During his time in jail while awaiting the charges, Woolley was involved in three different fights with the other inmates and an attempt to smuggle PCP into the jail, before finally being separated from the other inmates on the grounds he was too violent.

On 5 April 2000, Woolley was arrested while boarding a flight to Port-au-Prince when airport security discovered he was taking a handgun to Haiti. Following his conviction, he was sent to prison, where he was attacked by another prisoner on 31 January 2001. Prison officials stated it was a "suicidal" gesture on the part of the man who had attacked him.

=== Operation Springtime ===
Despite a fondness for traditional "old school" policing, Commander André Bouchard pressed very strongly in the 1990s for the Montreal police adopt modern scientific methods, most notably in pressuring the city to pay for a DNA lab. Bouchard had assigned two detectives, Louis-Marc Pelletier and Michel Tremblay, to see if it was possible to match a list of suspects in various murders provided by the informer Dany Kane with DNA evidence. The detectives collected DNA from the Hells Angels and the Rockers by seizing items left in public, such as discarded cigarettes and used plastic coffee cups, and then sought to match the DNA samples with DNA found on crime scenes, which led them to Woolley. Pelletier and Tremblay matched DNA samples from the hair found in a toque discovered alongside the discarded gun that had been used to kill Beauchamp to Woolley. By February 2001, Bouchard's Major Crimes Unit had enough evidence to charge 42 Hells Angels and Rockers with some 23 counts of first-degree murder.

On 30 March 2001, the police launched Operation Springtime, which saw all of the members of the Rockers arrested, including Woolley. Woolley was suspected of several murders on behalf of the Hells Angels. Commander Bouchard of the Service de police de la Ville de Montréal thought that the first one arrested to make a deal with the Crown would be Woolley, the Rockers president who, as a black man, was not allowed to join the Hells Angels proper. Bouchard said of Woolley: "We've got him cold and his lawyer knew it. We've got DNA. I mean, he was dead. What more do you need?...Son of a bitch. He was the only one who really never said a word." By contrast, Woolley's associate, René "Balloune" Charlebois, the Rocker who had been promoted up to the Hells Angels, broke down in tears and wanted to make a deal with the Crown for a lesser prison sentence. Commander Bouchard told Charlebois: "Fuck you! No deal for you!", which caused Charlebois to cry even more while Woolley maintained a stony silence. Woolley was charged with conspiracy to traffic in narcotics and with first-degree murder for the slaying of Rock Machine biker Pierre Beauchamp on 20 December 1996.

A psychological evaluation done after his arrest found that Woolley's main issue was his uncontrollable rage, as the psychologist discovered that Woolley was an extremely violent man prone to excessive anger and murderous tendencies. The psychologist also found that Woolley had poor judgement and low self-esteem, noting that he tried to commit suicide at the age of 16 as he was ashamed to be a black man in a society where being white was the ideal. About the "Uncle Tom" allegations, the police psychologist found that Woolley's self-esteem problems led him to seek approval from white racist authority figures such as the Hells Angels to maintain a sense of self-worth, which made him into a willing and submissive follower of the Angels because of rather than despite their racism. In April 2001, Woolley refused any more psychologist evaluations, which he believed would help the Crown with convicting him.

Woolley's relations with the Rizzuto family came to be fraught after Vito Rizzuto was arrested in January 2004 following an extradition request from the United States. Woolley had a close friendship with Giordano, but his relations with Arcadi were described as being "venomous". Woolley was tried twice for Beauchamp's murder and was acquitted both times as the defense lawyers argued that the DNA evidence that the Crown had introduced was planted. While awaiting trial at the Ste-Anne-des Plaines jail, Woolley came to be friends with Rizzuto, who was being held there while he fought the extradition request. In 2005, Rizzuto and Woolley were often seen talking in French in the prison courtyard. In 2005, Woolley was convicted of other charges and was sent to serve his sentence at Kingston Penitentiary. On 27 June 2005, in a plea bargain, Woolley pleaded guilty to conspiracy to commit murder, conspiracy to traffic in narcotics, and gangsterism while the first-degree murder charges were dropped. Even while held at Kingston Penitentiary, Woolley was described as controlling the drug trade from his prison cell and had a monthly income of $10,000. In 2006, Woolley punched out another prisoner who questioned his authority whom was almost stabbed to death minutes later. In 2008, the National Parole Board turned down Woolley's request for parole under the grounds: "No matter where you find yourself in custody, the power conferred on you by your official status among bikers, and implicitly as the head of street gangs, is of such a scale that no [rehabilitation] program can sufficiently protect the public from the risk you represent".

=== Rizzuto family ===
On 13 February 2009, Woolley was arrested as part of Operation Axe, and thereby acquired the dubious honor of being the first Canadian to be charged with gangsterism twice. In January 2011, Woolley made a plea bargain with the Crown where he pleaded guilty to the Operation Axe charges in exchange for a lesser prison sentence. During his second sentence at Kingston Penitentiary, Woolley's closest friends in prison were the Hells Angel Harley Davidson Guindon and Juan Ramon Fernandez, the Toronto agent of the Rizzuto family. Guindon stated about Woolley: "He was always smiling. He was always laughing. He was the best chess player I've played".

Later in 2011, he was released on full parole and returned to Montreal. During the civil war that tore apart the Rizzuto family between Raynald Desjardins and Vito Rizzuto in the early 2010s, Woolley supported the latter and he was often called upon for help from Rizzuto, who seemed to have much respect for Woolley's abilities as a leader and as a killer. The renegade faction within the Rizzuto family led by Desjardins and his brother-in-law, Joseph Di Maulo, had the support of the 'Ndrangheta families of Ontario in a bid to topple Rizzuto. In 2010, the murders of Paolo Renda and Nicolo Rizzuto were major blows to Rizzuto's leadership of his crime family, and a number of Rizzuto family capos defected over to the Desjardins–Di Maulo faction, which appeared to be the stronger faction. There was a period in 2010 and 2011 when Rizzuto came close to losing control of his own crime family. The support of the Hells Angels along with Woolley were described as being crucial in helping Rizzuto survive the challenge. The mobster Andrew Scoppa told the journalists Felix Séguin and Eric Thibault that: "He brought in Gregory Woolley to get the bikers on his side. Vito was OK with Woolley because he knew him and he liked him". Scoppa described Woolley as a "pro" who was very useful for Rizzuto in beating back the challenge posed by the Desjardins–Di Maulo faction. Between 2011 and 2017, at least 12 members of the Desjardins faction were killed.

In August 2012, Woolley called for a meeting of various black Canadian street gang leaders in Sainte-Adèle, where he called for a union of all the street gangs under his leadership. In turn, the Hells Angels and the Rizzuto family were behind Woolley's efforts to unite all of the black street gangs of Montreal. One Haitian-Canadian gang leader who attended the meeting, Chénier Dupuy, refused the offer, saying it was a shame that Woolley was working for the racist Hells Angels and slapped Woolley across the face. A friend of Dupuy told the journalist Eric Thibault: "Like many veterans of the Bloods, Chenier said he wanted no part of Woolley. He said he would never work for the bikers or their dick suckers" (a disparaging reference to the Syndicate). Dupuy was murdered inside of his SUV on 13 August 2012, while Dupuy's deputy, Lamartine Sévère Paul, was murdered a few hours later outside of his apartment. With Dupuy and Paul removed from the scene, the planned merger went ahead. Woolley was described as the business partner of Rizzuto. When Rizzuto died in December 2013, Woolley attended his funeral alongside a number of Hells Angels leaders from Quebec and Ontario, and was given a place of honor at his funeral service despite not being a mafioso, which indicated that he was considered to be an important ally.

The journalist Julian Sher stated: "The Montreal Mafia leaders considered Woolley to be an equal to them". Woolley was often seen with Leonardo "Leo" Rizzuto, the son of Vito, who is described as being his successor along with Stefano Sollecito. In July 2015, Boucher, who was loyal to the Rizzuto faction, ordered from his prison cell for Woolley to kill Desjardins. In August 2015, Sollecito was recorded by a police wiretap as telling Leonardo Rizzuto: "We share business. We share things with Greg. We share big secrets". Sollecito described Woolley as more trustworthy and reliable than some other members of the Rizzuto family. Both Sollecito and Rizzuto described Woolley as an equal to the Rizzuto family. In November 2015, Woolley and 47 suspected underworld leaders were arrested in a sweep. Police claim the sweep revealed Woolley was part of a conspiracy to murder Desjardins. In May 2016, lawyers for Woolley and Boucher were able to stymie the preliminary inquiry phrase of the trial, saying both men wanted to attend the preliminary inquiry sessions, but demanded a change in venue, saying the Gouin courthouse was unsafe for their clients. In October 2018, Woolley was found guilty of conspiracy to traffic in narcotics and gangsterism. Project Magot-Mastiff, as the police investigation was known, established that Woolley had sold 192 kilograms of cocaine in the Hochelaga-Maisonneuve borough of Montreal between 2011 and 2015.

On 27 October 2018, in a plea bargain, the Crown dropped the conspiracy to commit murder charges in relation to the Desjardins murder plot against Woolley in exchange for him pleading guilty to the Project Magot-Mastiff charges. In a statement of fact at the plea bargain, it was established that Woolley along with another drug dealer, Dany "Lou" Sprinces Cadet, were part of a select group known as "les Bronzés", who were permitted to buy cocaine at a favorable price from the Rizzuto family. In April 2019, Woolley was convicted of selling methamphetamine in Bordeaux prison, for which he received a light sentence.

In November 2021, Woolley was released on full parole. Woolley was engaged to Christelle Huot, a French-Canadian woman who was a reality television star in Quebec on the Loft Story TV show between 2007 and 2009. Hout is well known in Quebec as "l'exhibitionniste du Loft" ("the Loft exhibitionist") owing to her frequent nudity and general flamboyant behavior. The couple lived in a luxury mansion in Saint-Jean-sur-Richelieu on rue des Trembles worth $3.8 million that had such features as "a 400-wine bottle cellar, a built-in sound system, an in-ground swimming pool, separate accommodation and 70,000 square feet of wooded land". The house was held in Hout's name only, and in 2022, it became the object of a dispute with the Canada Revenue Agency over claims of unpaid taxes. In May 2022, a drive-by shooting occurred, with someone opening fire on Woolley's house. In August 2022, somebody burned down Woolley's garage.

== Death ==
Woolley was killed in a shooting in Saint-Jean-sur-Richelieu, on 17 November 2023, aged 51. He was shot dead in a parking lot in front of his fiancée Christelle Huot and their child. His murder was a major violation of the underworld code in Canada, which forbids murders in front of wives and children. The Mafia expert Antonio Nicaso wrote that Woolley's murder was likely Mafia-related, as he wrote on his Twitter account: "The one in Montreal is an endless war. The latest murder is yet another attack on the power of what was once considered the most powerful crime family in Canada."

He was buried on 2 December 2023, at the Mafia-owned Loreto funeral home in Laval. The Catholic Church denied Woolley a funeral service in a church on the account of his gangster lifestyle. Woolley's funeral was attended by numerous Hells Angels, Rockers, mafiosi and street gang members. Among the attendants were Leonardo Rizzuto, Pietro D'Adamo, and Giuseppe "Gator" Focarazzo of the Rizzuto family; Mario Brouillette and Richard "Bert" Mayrand of the Hells Angels; and the Haitian-Canadian Jean-Philippe Célestin of the Syndicate.

== Books ==
- Cédilot, André; Noël, André (2011). Mafia Inc. The Long, Bloody Reign of Canada's Sicilian Clan. Toronto: Random House of Canada. ISBN 9780307360410.
- Cherry, Paul (2005). The Biker Trials: Bringing Down the Hells Angels. Toronto: ECW Press. ISBN 978-1-55022-638-6.
- Edwards, Peter; Nicaso, Antonio (2015). Business Or Blood Mafia Boss Vito Rizzuto's Last War. Toronto: Random House of Canada. ISBN 978-0-345-81376-3.
- Edwards, Peter (2017). Hard Road: Bernie Guindon and the Reign of the Satan's Choice Motorcycle Club. Toronto: Random House. ISBN 978-0345816108.
- Langton, Jerry (2015). Cold War How Organized Crime Works in Canada and Why It's About to Get More Violent. Toronto: HarperColllins. ISBN 978-1-4434-3255-9.
- O'Connor, D'Arcy (2011). Montreal's Irish Mafia: The True Story of the Infamous West End Gang. Toronto: John Wiley & Sons.
- Sanger, Daniel (2005). Hell's Witness. Toronto: Viking Canada. ISBN 0-670-04430-X.
- Séguin, Felix; Thibault, Éric (2022). Inside the Montreal Mafia: The Confessions of Andrew Scoppa. Toronto: ECW Press. ISBN 978-1770416673.
- Sher, Julian; Marsden, William (2003). The Road to Hell: How the Biker Gangs are Conquering Canada. A.A. Knopf Canada. ISBN 9780676975987.
