= Gaetano Panepinto =

Canadian mobster (1959–2000)

Gaetano "Guy" Panepinto (Italian pronunciation: [ɡaeˈtaːno paneˈpinto]; 1959 – October 3, 2000), also known as "the coffin guy" or the "discount coffin guy", was a Canadian mobster who served as the Toronto agent for the Montreal-based Rizzuto crime family.

Panepinto

== Toronto agent ==
Panepinto was born in Sicily and later immigrated to Canada. As a fellow Sicilian, Panepinto won the trust of Vito Rizzuto. Panepinto was the owner of the Canadian subsidiary of the American-based Casket Royale coffin company that sold the cheapest coffins in Toronto. Panepinto turned the slogan associated with his business, "Do not make an emotional loss a financial loss" into a symbol of his supposed public-oriented generosity. He was well known in Toronto for his television ads that frequently aired on late nights in the 1980s and 1990s where Panepinto solemnly intoned this slogan. Business at Panepinto's coffin store at St. Clair Avenue West in the Corso Italia district was described as very brisk as the price of his coffins ranged from $1,800 to $2,000, which was half the price of the average coffin in Toronto. One of Panepinto's discount coffins, the George, was made of pressboard and sold for $200. He gave away coffins for children for free as a way of showing support for parents grieving the loss of their child. The Canadian journalists André Cédilot and André Noël described Panepinto as having a "split personality-good Dr. Jekyll by day, unsavory Mr. Hyde by night". Panepinto's persona was of a kind-hearted businessman who sold cheap coffins and donated generously to charity, but his major sources of income were running illegal gambling houses and stealing consumer electronics, especially stereo systems, from warehouses. Cédilot and Noël described Panepinto as being "Vito Rizzuto's right-hand man in Ontario" in charge of all Rizzuto family operations in Ontario.

In 1991, Panepinto along with his business partner in Casket Royale, Frank Natale Roda, were involved in an unsuccessful attempt to kill the man who had tried to hire a hitman to kill the boxer and gangster Eddie Melo in 1989. The murder plot failed when the bomb that Roda was to plant under the target's car exploded prematurely and ripped off one of Roda's arms. Like many other Canadian gangsters, Panepinto had a fondness for working out in the gym and for steroid abuse. He was the leader of a criminal "crew" who sold ecstasy, GHB, the so-called "date rape drug"; and marijuana. The most prominent member of Panepinto's crew was a thief known as "Spiderman" for his ability to climb up walls, whose mother was the mistress of Rizzuto. Another prominent member of Panepinto's crew was the owner of the gym where Panepinto liked to work out in: former American football player Constantin "Big Gus" Alevizos, who stood 6'6" and weighed 450 pounds. In 1999, Juan Ramon Fernandez arrived in Toronto to join Panepinto's crew. Panepinto was close with a number of outlaw biker gangs in the Toronto area such as the Vagabonds, the Para-Dice Riders and the Last Chance.

In April 1997, Panepinto met with Pasquale "Fat Pat" Musitano of the Musitano crime family at the Casino Niagara in Niagara Falls to form an alliance between the Musitano and Rizzuto families. Much of the discussion centered around the upcoming murder of Johnny Papalia. On October 22, 1997, and again on October 23, 1997, Rizzuto, Panepinto and Musitano had dinner at an Italian restaurant in Hamilton. Rizzuto appointed Panepinto his Ontario lieutenant and told Musitano that he was now to work for him. On October 25, 1997, Musitano phoned Panepinto to ask if Rizzuto was happy with him. Panepinto answered: "It was good. He's very happy...He gave us some advice before heading back to Montreal". Panepinto owned a house worth $500,000 on Laurel Avenue where he lived with his wife and their three sons.

== The Napoli-Oppedisano murders ==
In early 2000, Panepinto became angry with two cousins that recently arrived from Italy: Domenic Napoli and Antonio Oppedisano, who started to install their video lottery machines in various bars in territory that Panepinto considered his own without his permission. Both Napoli and Oppedisano worked for Antonio Commisso of the Commisso 'ndrina clan. Oppedisano and Napoli were from Siderno and Napoli had worked as a hitman for Cosimo "The Quail" Commisso in both Canada and Italy. In March 2000, Oppedisano and Napoli went for a meeting with Panepinto and were never seen or heard from again. It is believed that Panepinto had killed Napoli and Oppedisano in the basement of his Casket Royale store, dismembered their corpses and burned what was left.

The Commissio brothers went to Montreal to meet Rizzuto and asked him what he knew about the murders of Napoli and Oppedisano. Rizzuto replied that he knew nothing. Angry with Panepinto for two murders that occurred without obtaining his approval first, Rizzuto withdrew his "protection" of Panepinto meaning that Panepinto could now be killed without fear of revenge by the Rizzuto family. Panepinto fled to Montreal and stayed there until September 2000. Upon being informed that Rizzuto had resumed his "protection" of him, he returned to Toronto, unaware that the promise was a lie. Rizzuto had personally assured Panepinto in a meeting that his "protection" had resumed, and he need not fear the Commisso clan should he return to Toronto.

== Murder ==
On October 3, 2000, Panepinto was driving his maroon Cadillac on Bloor Street and stopped for a traffic light. A minivan that had been following him pulled up next to his car, and from the passenger window, the hitman opened fire on him, firing some six bullets, three of which struck Panepinto in the abdomen, chest and shoulder. As Panepinto was bleeding badly, his Cadillac slid out of control into the intersection while the minivan raced away. The hitman who killed him was Salvatore "Sam" Calautti.

Panepinto's funeral was held at the St. Clare Catholic Church in Toronto on October 10, 2000 and was a lavish Mafia funeral attended by Rizzuto along with chief lieutenants Paolo Renda, Rocco Sollecito and Francesco Arcadi. Joining the funeral were 50 outlaw bikers from various biker gangs such as the Para-Dice Riders and the Last Chance who rode in their motorcycles as part of the funeral procession. On September 18, 2002, the Ontario Provincial Police executed Operation RIP and charged 31 men with various counts of conspiracy to smuggle ecstasy, GHB, steroids, painkillers, psilocybin mushrooms, marijuana, dynamite, firearms, counterfeit credit cards and counterfeit passports. Also seized in the Operation RIP raids were $10 million in cash. Detective Inspector Paul Sorel of the York Regional Police told the media that if Panepinto were still alive, he would have been arrested as part of the Operation RIP raids. Cédilot and Noël wrote many of the men that Rizzuto had recruited for Ontario such as Panepinto were "odd fellows" as he seemed for prefer eccentric and colourful characters to run his operations in Ontario.

== Books ==
- Cédilot, André; Noël, André (2011). Mafia Inc The Long, Bloody Reign of Canada's Sicilian Clan. Toronto: Random House of Canada. ISBN 978-0-30736040-3.
- Edwards, Peter; Nicaso, Antonio (2015). Business Or Blood Mafia Boss Vito Rizzuto's Last War. Toronto: Random House of Canada. ISBN 978-0-345-81376-3.
