= Lorenzo Giordano =

Canadian mobster (1963–2016)

Lorenzo "The Skunk" Giordano (Italian pronunciation: [loˈrɛntso dʒorˈdaːno]; 1963 – March 1, 2016) was a Canadian mobster in the Montreal-based Rizzuto crime family.

Lorenzo Giordano

== Underboss ==
Giordano was a member of a Rizzuto family crew who reported to Francesco Arcadi. Alongside Francesco Del Balso, Giordano was a member of the "Young Turk" faction of the younger, more aggressive Mafiosi. The Canadian journalists André Cédilot and André Noël wrote: "Arcadi's crew answered to the Rizzuto clan, but most of its young member lacked the judgment of old-school mobsters like Vito's father, Nicolò, and Paolo Renda. Aggressive, impulsive, they seemed not to care about the consequences of their actions". Giordano's favorite meeting place was the Bar Laennec in Laval. Like Arcadi, Giordano often associated with Gregory Woolley, the boss of both the Syndicate street gang and the Hells Angels puppet gang, the Rockers Motorcycle Club. Giordano's usual partner was Del Balso whom he usually met at the Bar Laennec. Giordano's nickname of "the Skunk" related to the fact that his hair was black except for a white streak in the middle.

On 24 September 2003, Giordano went driving his new Ferrari 550 Maranello under the influence of alcohol and smashed his car in a traffic incident. The next day, Giordano called a Rizzuto family soldier, Mike Lapolla to tell him "my wife is gonna to kill me" if she learnt of his traffic incident, leading to Lapolla to say that he would testify that it was him who was driving the Ferrari at the time of the accident. In a phone call recorded by the police, Del Balso told Giordano to take his wrecked Ferrari to an automobile repair shop owned by John Scotti, whom Del Balso described as a "master at disguising cars". The policeman at the scene of the accident discovered a part of a blue Ferrari bumper, which allowed him to discover that it came from a Ferrari listed as belonging to a numbered company whose owner was Richard Krolik, a bookmaker for the Rizzuto family. The matter was settled when Lapolla confessed that he was the alleged driver of the Ferrari at the time of the accident even though he clearly knew no details of the accident when giving his statement to the police.

After Rizzuto's arrest following an extradition request from the United States in January 2004, a number of other gangsters attempted to challenge the duopoly on selling cocaine and heroin held by the Rizzuto family and the Hells Angels. One such drug dealer was an Iranian immigrant, Essy Navad Noroozi, better known by his alias Javad Mohammed Nozarian, who sold heroin below the price set by the Rizzuto family. On 18 April 2004, Giordano ran into Nozarian at the Globe, an expensive restaurant, and decided to kill him right on the spot. During the struggle, Nozarian drew up his handgun, but Giordano stabbed him repeatedly. The struggle ended with Giordano seizing Nozarian's gun which he used to shoot Nozarian in the groin and shot off both of his testicles. Nozarian survived the shooting, but followed the underworld code and refused to testify against Giordano. Paolo Renda harshly criticized Giordano for the brawl with Nozarian and for not killing him as left open the possibility that Nozarian might turn Crown's evidence. Renda often chided Giordano for his heavy drinking and his impulsive behavior. The journalists Peter Edwards and Antonito Nicaso described Giordano as "a fit man with a tough reputation". After Rizzuto was arrested in 2004, a committee of caretaker leaders for Vito Rizzuto was formed of Giordano, Nicolo Rizzuto, Paolo Renda, Rocco Sollecito, Francesco Arcadi and Francesco Del Balso.

== Operation Colisée ==
On November 2, 2004, the Royal Canadian Mounted Police installed a secret camera inside the Bar Laennec in Laval, which over the next two years recorded Giordano visiting the bar 221 times while Del Balso visited the bar 541 times. Giordano and Del Balso ran an online gambling website whose clients were recruited via telemarketing. The website was based in Belize, and then moved to the Kahnawake Mohawk Reserve after a gambling license was granted to the Kahnawake reserve band council. Between 2004 and 2005, the website had 1,609 users who made 820,000 bets, which allowed the Rizzuto family to make a profit of $26.8 million. Frank Faustini, a baggage handler with Air Canada, had run up an $823,000 gambling debt via their gambling website. On December 15, 2004, Faustini was summoned to the Bar Laennec by Del Balso and the RCMP cameras recorded him along with Giordano and another Rizzuto family soldier Mike Lapolla beating Faustini. Giordano's shirt ended up being socked in Faustini's blood. Giordano was used by Arcadi to threaten restaurant owners to buy Moka d'Oro coffee, and smashed up a restaurant in Boucherville after the owner refused a request that he only buy Moka d'Oro coffee.

On January 1, 2005 in a phone call to Arcadi that the police had bugged, Giordano admitted that he was a sadist who enjoyed violence and inflicting pain on others, saying of one beating he had inflicted "we gave it good". On March 9, 2005, Lapolla was murdered on the dance of the Moomba's nightclub by Thierry Beaubrun, a member of the Crack Down Posse gang, who in turn was killed by Lapolla's bodyguards. Giordano who was present at the shooting gave an account of the incident to the Rizzuto family "executive" at the Consenza Social Club the next day. Giordano stated that Lapolla "had no chance". On November 25, 2005, he and Del Balso stormed into the office of John Xanthoudakis, the owner of the bankrupt Norshield Financial Group, at the Place Ville Marie. Giordano and Del Balso ordered one of their thugs, Caroles Narvaez Orellana, to beat Xanthoudakis in his office. Xanthoudakis's face required 12 stitches to repair the fractures caused by Orellan's fists. On March 8, 2006, Orellan, Giordano and Del Balso were charged with assaulting Xanthoudakis, but the charges were dropped after Xanthoudakis refused to testify following death threats.

In August 2006, Giordano often with Arcadi, Del Balso and Giuseppe Fetta met in a Woodbridge, Ontario restaurant with Antonio Coluccio where it was agreed that in exchange for the Coluccio family paying off the gambling debts of the hitman Salvatore Calautti that were owed to Del Balso, Calautti would work for the Coluccio family. Later in August 2006, Giordano was drinking with Del Balso and Charles Huneault, a Hells Angels supporter at the Cavalli restaurant. Under the influence of alcohol, Huneault was involved in a brawl with Giordano and Del Balso, which led to his expulsion. As Huneault was getting into his car, Giordano followed him out to the street and opened fire. Giordano was arrested for possession of a weapon for a dangerous purpose. On August 30, 2006, Domenico Macri, a cousin of Arcadi's, was killed in a case of mistaken identity. At a meeting at the Consenza Social Club the next day attended by Renda, Arcadi, Del Balso, Rocco Sollecito, Nicolò Rizzuto, Moreno Gallo and Tony Mucci, Giordano pressed for swift vengeance. The RCMP bugs recorded Giordano as saying in Italian to Arcadi: "They got one of ours this time. We can't let this pass".

On 22 November 2006, the RCMP issued a warrant for Giordano's arrest as part of the four-year Royal Canadian Mounted Police investigation known as Project Colisée. Giordano evaded the RCMP, dyed his hair all black, underwent plastic surgery and fled to Toronto; he was arrested in a Toronto gym on May 9, 2007. Giordano pled guilty on September 18, 2008 to "general conspiracy to commit extortion, bookmaking, illegal gaming as well as being in possession of the proceeds of crime" and was sentenced to eight years imprisonment. On February 9, 2009, Giordano was sentenced to 15 years in prison, reduced to 10 years on time served. He was released on parole in December 2015.

== Murder ==
While out on parole, Giordano was murdered on March 1, 2016, being shot dead in his car in Laval.

Just months later, Rocco Sollecito was shot to death in Laval. He was 67 years old at the time of his death.

On October 17, 2019, Jonathan Massari, Dominico Scarfo, Guy Dion and Marie-Josée Viau, were arrested and charged with planning and executing the murders of Sollecito and Giordano. With the testimonies of Dion and Viau, Scarfo was convicted of conspiracy to commit murder and first-degree murder of both Sollecito and Giordano and sentenced to 25 years in prison on April 11, 2022, and Massari pleaded guilty to conspiracy to commit murder of both Sollecito and Giordano and sentenced to 25 years in prison on March 13, 2023. In a statement of fact read out to the courtroom as part of his plea bargain, Massari stated that the leaders of the conspiracy were the Calabrian brothers Salvatore and Andrea Scoppa.

== Books ==
- Cédilot, André; Noël, André (2011). Mafia Inc. The Long, Bloody Reign of Canada's Sicilian Clan. Toronto: Random House of Canada. ISBN 9780307360410.
- Edwards, Peter; Nicaso, Antonio (2015). Business Or Blood Mafia Boss Vito Rizzuto's Last War. Toronto: Random House of Canada. ISBN 978-0-345-81376-3.
