= Juan Ramon Fernandez =

Juan Ramon Fernandez can refer to:

- Juan Fernández (footballer, born 1980), Argentine footballer.
- Juan Ramon Fernandez (gangster) (1956–2013), Spanish gangster.
