= Francesco Arcadi =

Canadian mobster

Francesco Arcadi (Italian pronunciation: [franˈtʃesko arˈkaːdi]; born 1964) is a Canadian mobster in the Montreal-based Rizzuto crime family.

== Early life ==
Arcadi served as one of the principle lieutenants of Vito Rizzuto, head of the Rizzuto family. Arcadi had been a member of the Cotroni crime family, but defected over to the Rizzuto family in the 1980s. As a Calabrian, Arcadi was an outsider in the Sicilian Rizzuto family whose leaders almost all came from the villages of Cattolica Eraclea and Siculiana. The journalists Peter Edwards and Antonio Nicaso described Arcadi as a "crude and thoughtless" man who needlessly alienated black outlaw bikers such as Gregory Woolley. On June 30, 1995, Arcadi was one of the guests at the wedding of Nicolo Rizzuto Jr. to Elenora Ragusa, a marriage which united Canada's leading Mafia with one of the leading Mafia families of Sicily. Arcadi seized control of Montreal Trudeau Airport, putting dozens of Canada customs agents and baggage handlers on the Rizzuto family's payroll in order to smuggle in cocaine from South America. In addition, Arcadi charged a "tax" of 3 percent on all drug profits on other gangs that wanted to smuggle in drugs via Trudeau airport. Despite being a Calabrian, Arcadi was very close to Rizzuto, with whom he normally went on vacations with to the Dominican Republic every January. Within the Rizzuto family, Arcadi was known as "Compare Frank". As part of the Rizzuto's family's expansion into Ontario, Arcadi had the key role as the "ambassador" who was supposed to bring the seven 'Ndrangheta families of Toronto under the control of the Rizzuto family.

Arcadi served as the leader of the "Young Turk" faction of the Rizzuto family whose most important members were Francesco Del Balso and Lorenzo Giordano whose usual meeting place was the Bar Laennec in Laval. Arcadi maintained close links for a time with Gregory Woolley, the boss of both the Syndicate street gang and of a Hells Angels puppet gang, the Rockers Motorcycle Club. The Canadian journalists André Cédilot and André Noël wrote of Arcadi: "He was a hardened criminal, but he had nothing of the charisma, finesse and leadership qualities that Vito displayed".

In the spring of 2000, Arcadi met with Paolo Gervasi to ask him to stop selling cocaine to the Rock Machine which threatened the Rizzuto family's alliance with the Hells Angels. On April 20, 2000, Salvatore Gervasi, the son of Paolo, was murdered with his corpse being found inside of the trunk of his Porsche, which was parked outside of his house. Gervasi met with Arcadi, who denied being responsible for his son's murder, but again told him to stop selling cocaine to the Rock Machine. On August 14, 2000, Gervasi was shot and badly wounded in a murder attempt. Two days later, Arcadi met with Rizzuto where a police wiretap recorded him as saying about Gervasi: "There's only one way, a bullet to the head". Gervasi was wounded by a car bomb planted in his Jeep Cherokee on February 25, 2002. The third murder attempt on January 19, 2004 was successful after Gervasi was shot and killed inside of his car.

On July 13, 2001, there was a failed attempt to kidnap Arcadi ordered by Christian Deschěnes, a French-Canadian associate of the Rizzuto family who wanted to recover the $800,000 in drug debts owed to him by Arcadi. One of the men Deschěnes recruited, a cousin of his wife, Denis-Rolland Girouard, was a police informer. The Montreal police arrested the kidnappers as they were on their way to the ConsenzaSocial Club, intent upon shooting their way into the club to seize Arcadi. In January 2003 during one of their annual trips to the Dominican Republic, Rizzuto in a conversation in Italian with Arcadi described to him how he was the gunman responsible for the murder of three capos in the Bonanno crime family in 1981. The conversation with Arcadi which was covertly recorded by the RCMP was key evidence at Rizzuto's trial for first degree murder in New York. On January 3, 2003 at the Diente de Perro resort, Rizzuto told Arcadi about how he had shot and killed Alphonse "Sonny Red" Indelicato, Philip "Philly Lucky" Giaccone and Dominick "Big Trin" Trinchera on May 5, 1981 as a favour to the Bonanno family boss, Philip Rastelli. In January 2004, the United States requested Rizzuto's extradition on the basis of the evidence collected by the RCMP. After Rizzuto was arrested in 2004, a committee of caretaker leaders for Vito Rizzuto was formed of Arcadi, Nicolo Rizzuto, Paolo Renda, Rocco Sollecito, Lorenzo Giordano and Francesco Del Balso. As a leader, Arcadi saw the breakdown in relations with the black Canadian street gangs such as the Crack Down Posse and the Bo-Gars whom Rizzuto had cultivated. After Juan Ramon Fernandez was convicted in 2004, Arcadi replaced him as the Rizzuto's family agent in Ontario and he frequently visited Woodbridge, Ontario to meet various Toronto area 'Ndrangheta leaders.

One Rizzuto family gangster, Giuseppe Torre, lied to Arcadi about the size of a cocaine shipment coming in from Haiti in January 2005, saying he was importing 120 kilos in a bid to swindle Arcadi who always collected three percent of the profits on all cocaine smuggled in via Trudeau airport. The RCMP seized the 218 kilos of cocaine that Torre had imported, leading to Arcadi to impose "fines" of $100,000 on each member of Torre's crew to punish them for their dishonesty. Arcadi told Torre that he was to hand over all of his profits from his next few drug shipments as a punishment and warned him to never try to cheat him again after lying about the size of his cocaine shipments.

== Project Colisée ==
During Project Colisée, the Royal Canadian Mounted Police videotaped Arcadi visiting the Consenza Social Club 616 times to see Nicolo Rizzuto between 2004 and 2006. On March 9, 2005, Thierry Beubrun, a member of Woolley's Crack Down Posse, shot dead a Rizzuto family soldier, Mike Lapolla, and in turn was shot dead by other Rizzuto family soldiers. The police bug recorded Arcadi as saying the Rizzuto family should not let the incident escalate into a war with Woolley's gang while Giuseppe Sollecito (the son of Rocco Sollecito) in anger told Arcadi: "There will be blood. The blacks are not people you can sit down and reason with. They are animals". On August 11, 2005, Giovanni "Johnny" Bertolo, a Rizzuto family soldier who tried to sell cocaine in his old territory after his release from prison that had been taken over by Arcadi was killed, which led to a breakdown in relations with Raynald Desjardins. Bertolo was working for Desjardins who saw his murder as a personal insult by Arcadi.

Arcadi took a particular interest in seizing control of the coffee market in Montreal as he attempted to force all restaurateurs to buy his coffee, leading him to send out thugs to make death threats against restaurateurs who did not want to buy his coffee. Arcadi was recorded as telling a Rizzuto family soldier Antonio Vaelli: "As soon as you see a different package of coffee, you tell them I'll break down the whole place". Arcadi had three of his men trash a restaurant in Boucherville after the owner refused to buy Moka d'Oro, a line of Italian coffee whom Leonardo Vanelli and Nicodemo Cotroni (one of the sons of Frank Cotroni) had the exclusive rights to sell in Canada. In January 2004, Arcadi ordered Del Balso, the "head bailiff" of the Rizzuto family to "talk" to the owner of a precise machine company in Rivière-des-Praires to make him pay $6,000. In a phone call, Del Balso told the owner of the company "the guy that's going to make you eat out of a straw for six months if you don't pay him", followed up by the statement "you hear me? I know you have it on tape, don't worry about it. Just pay the bill, okay? And I'm not going to come and tell you again. The next time I break your head, okay?"

Arcadi was visited at the Consenza Social Club by a rival gangster, Lugi D'Amico, who claimed that the Rizzuto family owned him $900,000 following a failed attempt to smuggle marijuana into the United States in alliance with the Hells Angels Sherbrooke chapter. Arcadi had called D'Amico a "damn wanker" during the meeting, which escalated the dispute. D'Amico threatened to behead Arcadi if he did not receive the money he claimed was owing to him. Arcadi had one of D'Amico's cars burned in revenge for the threats. On 31 October 2005, four men wearing masks posed as trick-or-treaters kidnaped Nicolò Varacalli, a close ally of Arcadi. Left behind was a note saying that Varacalli would be killed if Arcadi did not repay the $900,000. The RCMP bugs at the Consenza Social Club revealed that Arcadi was terrified and hysterical as he expressed much fear of "the Frenchmen" (his term for the Hells Angels) whom he believed were acting with D'Amico against him. Arcadi admitted that he did not know what to do as he was recorded as saying: "There's no money now. Just leftovers". Luca D'Amico arrived at the Consenza Social Club with a letter addressed to Nicolo Rizzuto that blamed Arcadi for the kidnapping and promised to release Varacalli in exchange for him resolving the dispute in their favour. Varacalli was ultimately released in a goodwill gesture. To apply more pressure, Luca and Patrico D'Amico walked into the Consenza Social Club with their guns drawn in an implied threat. After the D'Amicos left, Arcadi was heard to say he was afraid of the "crazy guys" and did not want to leave the Consenza Social Club as he feared he would be shot down the moment he stepped out. Afterwards, Arcadi refused to go outside without a gun while Nicolo Rizzuto tried to hire some hitmen from Venezuela to kill the D'Amicos. On April 12, 2006, Arcadi was videotaped counting wads of cash with Renda where he was recorded as saying: "This is compare Rocco's [Sollecito's] and Lorenzo's [Giordano's]". When Rizzuto was extradited to the United States on August 17, 2006, he disparaged Arcadi's leadership abilities to the two Mounties driving him to the airport as he predicated chaos in the Montreal underworld with Arcadi as leader.

On August 30, 2006, Arcadi's nephew, Domenico Macri, was killed. The police believe the murder was in revenge for Bertolo murder the previous year and that Arcadi might had been the actual target. Arcadi drove a Cadillac very similar to Macri's and Macri had driving just behind his Cadillac when he was killed. At a meeting at the Consenza Social Club, Del Balso and Giordano pressed for vengeance while Sollecito told them to wait. Arcadi was recorded as saying: "Me, I agree. Here we are, Father, Son and the Holy Ghost. I agree that it's things that we have to reason out; things have to be measured, things have to be evaluated. But when it gets to a certain point and we are touched by some stupidities, the discussions have to be short". Arcadi who was clearly shaken by Macri's murder seemed very afraid for his life told the others that he was leaving for Italy immediately. Renda told Arcadi: "See, what you gotta do now, find an island. Take your wife and leave". Arcadi together with his wife fled Montreal for Italy, which removed him from the leadership of the Rizzuto family.

Shortly after his return to Canada in October 2006, Arcadi was arrested by the Mounties at his cottage in Hemmingford on November 22, 2006. Arcadi crashed his car into a ditch when he saw the Mounties drive up to his cottage. Found inside of his cottage was an arsenal of illegal guns. Arcadi was arrested along with dozens of others including Nicolo Rizzuto, Paolo Renda, Rocco Sollecito, Francesco Del Balso, and Lorenzo Giordano as part of the four-year Royal Canadian Mounted Police investigation known as Project Colisée. Arcadi was held at Bordeaux jail in the same wing with Giordano and Del Balso. Arcadi pled guilty on September 18, 2008 to "general conspiracy to commit extortion, bookmaking, illegal gaming as well as being in possession of the proceeds of crime" and was sentenced to eight years imprisonment. Arcadi was sentenced to 15 years in prison. After the murder of Nicolo Rizzuto in 2010, Arcadi was described as being the "interim" leader of the Rizzuto family whom was involved in a feud with Raynald Desjardins who along with Joe Di Maulo had attempted to take over the Rizzuto family. During the civil war within the Rizzuto family between Rizzuto and Desjardins, Arcadi stayed loyal to Rizzuto.

A review by the National Parole Board stated: "You were closed off and followed the law of Omerta (the Mafia's code of silence) without opening up about your past or current life (and) while never showing concrete action or any desire to change your criminal way of life". Arcadi told the Parole Board that he wished to end his life of crime as he wanted to "manage a garden, raise animals and spend the rest of his time with his family" if released on parole. Arcadi was released on parole in February 2016, but ordered to live in a half-way house.

== Books ==
- Cédilot, André; Noël, André (2011). Mafia Inc. The Long, Bloody Reign of Canada's Sicilian Clan. Toronto: Random House of Canada. ISBN 9780307360410.
- Edwards, Peter; Nicaso, Antonio (2015). Business Or Blood Mafia Boss Vito Rizzuto's Last War. Toronto: Random House of Canada. ISBN 978-0-345-81376-3.
