= Francesco Del Balso =

Canadian mob part of the Rizzuto crime family

Del Balso arrest, November 22, 2006

Francesco "Chit" Del Balso (Italian pronunciation: [franˈtʃesko del ˈbalso]; April 13, 1970 – June 5, 2023) was a Canadian mobster in the Montreal-based Rizzuto crime family.

== Rizzuto family and gambling ==
Del Balso was regarded as the leader of the "Young Turk" faction of the Rizzuto family. The Canadian journalists André Cédilot and André Noël wrote that the "Young Turk" faction were "Aggressive, impulsive, they seemed not to care about the consequences of their actions". The "Young Turks" were closely allied with the Syndicate, a Haitian-Canadian street gang led by Gregory Woolley who also served as the president of the Rockers Motorcycle Club, which in turn was a puppet gang of the Hells Angels. Alongside Lorenzo Giordano, Del Balso worked for Francesco Arcadi. Described as pugnacious and aggressive, Del Balso and Giordano tended to work with the Hells Angels and street gangs such as the Syndicate. Considered to be one of the most intimidating leaders of the Rizzuto family, Del Balso was the man most assigned to "talk" to debtors. After Rizzuto was arrested in 2004, a committee of caretaker leaders for Vito Rizzuto was formed of Del Balso, Nicolo Rizzuto, Paolo Renda, Rocco Sollecito, Francesco Arcadi and Lorenzo Giordano.

On November 2, 2004, the Royal Canadian Mounted Police installed a secret camera inside the Bar Laennec in Laval, which over the next two years recorded Giordano visiting the bar 221 times while Del Balso visited the bar 541 times. Giordano and Del Balso ran an online gambling website whose clients were recruited via telemarketing. The website was based in Belize, and then moved to the Kahnawake Mohawk Reserve after a gambling license was granted to the Kahnawake reserve band council. Del Balso had between 34 and 58 agents working in his telemarketing office recruiting people to register for the website. Between 2004 and 2005, the website had 1,609 users who made 820,000 bets, which allowed the Rizzuto family to make a profit of $26.8 million. Del Balso was a gambling addict who was often seen at the Casino de Montreal. Between 2001 and 2003, Del Balso bet $7.6 million at the Casino de Montreal and won $2.5 million. The loss of $5.1 million over a two year period did not concern him as Del Balso's gambling was a form of money laundering, which allowed explanation to the Canada Revenue Agency the hundreds of thousands of dollars in cash he kept at his house as the result of his winnings.

Del Balso's wife owned a luxury villa in Acapulco that cost $352,000 that had been paid for entirely in cash. Del Balso sat on the board of directors of the Intermarché Bellerose grocery chain and listed his investment in the Intermarché Lagoria grocery store chain as his source of income when he filed his taxes. In February 2006, Intermarché Bellerose provided Del Balso with a record of employment and fake pay stubs to prove that he had been working for the company over the several years.

In November 2004, Frank Faustini, a former Air Canada baggage handler and a gambling addict had run up a debt of $823,000 via Del Balso's gambling website. On December 8, 2004, Del Balso was recorded as telling one of his subordinates to inform Faustini that he was to get a "serious beating" if he did not pay off his debts. On December 15, 2004, the police camera at the Bar Laennec recorded Del Balso, Giordano and another mobster Mike Lapolla beating Faustini. Faustini was also in debt to Richard Griffin of the West End Gang concerning a shipment of 1,300 kilos of cocaine from Venezuela that had landed in Newark, New Jersey and later been seized in Boucherville. There was a lengthy dispute between Griffin and Del Balso about whom Faustini was to pay first. On June 27, 2006, Faustini paid Griffin $350,000 that he had withdrawn from his bank account in the Bahamas. On July 12, 2006, Griffin was murdered outside of his house, being shot down with an AK-47 assault rifle. Del Balso was the prime suspect in Griffin's murder, but was not charged.

On November 25, 2005, Del Balso was hired by Intermarché Lagoria grocery store chain owner Cosimo Chimienti, to recover the $300,000 that he had invested with John Xanthoudakis, the CEO of Norshield Financial Group, who had stolen the money. The same day, Del Balso, Giordano and one of their thugs, Carlos Narvaez Orellana, went to see Xanthoudakis at his office. Orellana beat up Xanthoudaiks while Del Balso and Giordano watched on. On March 8, 2006, Del Balso was charged with assault after Xanthoudakis made a complaint to the police. The charges were later dropped when in response to death threats, Xanthoudakis stated he was not willing to testify against Del Balso in court. At a meeting at the Consenza Social Club, Del Balso was criticized by Nicolo Rizzuto and Paolo Renda for not ensuring that Xanthoudakis paid up sooner.

In November 2005, Del Balso was also hired to pressure Magdi Garas Samaan, the CEO of Services Financiers Rdp firm, who had lost $2.5 million of his investors' money, to return the lost assets. After a beating delivered on November 29, Samaan tried to commit suicide. On December 19, 2005, Del Balso tried to force Samaan to remortgage his $4 million house to provide equity, but was stymied when Samaan was successful in his second suicide attempt made the next day. Samaan's widow stated it was Del Balso's tactics that had driven her husband to kill himself. Upon learning that Samaan was missing (his corpse was not found until Christmas Day), Del Balso turned his attention to his wife. On 22 December 2005, Del Balso told Renda that Mrs. Samaan had agreed to remortgage her house to pay off her husband's debts.

On August 30, 2006, Domenico Marci, a Del Balso confidante, was killed by a motorcycle riding assassin. At a meeting at the Consenza Social Club the next day, Del Balso pressed for vengeance, though the fact that he did not know who had killed Marci left him at a loss about whom to seek vengeance against. At Marci's funeral on 6 September 2006, Del Balso was admonished by his father, Girolamo Del Balso, for his lifestyle as the police bug recorded him as having complained that the younger generation of Mafiosi were too materialistic and selfish as he commented: "How can they live with serenity when they need $100,000 a day to survive? It's a huge problem". His son was less philosophical as he stated: "Today it was him [Marci]. Tomorrow it could be me". Del Balso purchased two armored cars from Toronto, a Nissen Pathfinder Armada and a Toyota 4Runner. He was recorded by a police bug as saying that he wanted the windows to be able to protect him from bullets fired by an AK-47 assault rife and for the bottoms to be bombproof. After Marci's murder, Del Balso never went outside without a gun.

On September 4, 2006, Giuseppe Feta were seen handling weapons such as a handguns fitted out with silencers and machineguns at a warehouse owned by Del Balso. Del Balso was also engaged in gun-running and when the police raided his warehouse they found two AR-15 semi-automatic rifles, one machinegun, one shotgun, two bulletproof vests, and ammunition. In October 2006, Del Balso along with Arcadi, Giordano and Feta met in a Woodbridge, Ontario restaurant with Antonio Coluccio of the Coluccio 'ndrina of Toronto to settle the long-standing matter of the gambling debts of the 'Ndrangheta hitman Salvatore Calautti, which were now owed to Del Balso. It was agreed that the Coluccios would pay off the debts owing to Del Balso in exchange for Calutti committing a murder for them.

== Prison ==
On November 22, 2006, Del Balso was arrested along with dozens of others including Nicolo Rizzuto, Paolo Renda, Rocco Sollecito, Francesco Arcadi, and Lorenzo Giordano as part of the four-year Royal Canadian Mounted Police investigation known as Project Colisée. Sollecito pled guilty on September 18, 2008 to "general conspiracy to commit extortion, bookmaking, illegal gaming as well as being in possession of the proceeds of crime" and was sentenced to eight years imprisonment. Del Balso also pleaded guilty to filing false tax returns between 2003 and 2006 and for trafficking in cocaine in alliance with the Hells Angels. In one wiretapped phone call introduced as evidence by the Crown, Del Balso threatened the life of a ceramic company executive, saying: "Because the next time, you won't leave here, okay? You've been warned. It's over. Okay?" Del Balso was sentenced to 15 years in prison. He was released in 2016.

In May 2017, a French-Canadian man Marc Laflamme Berthelot broke into Del Balso's house and threatened to kill his family unless they told him where he was. One of Del Balso's relatives managed to call him to warn him about what was going on and he took off his electronic monitoring bracelet that he was required to wear on his ankle as part of a series of conditions imposed on him by the Parole Board of Canada. Due to this, in August 2017, his statutory release was revoked.

== Murder ==
In September 2022, Del Balso was arrested for allegedly trying to extort nuns and a priest at the Saint-Maxime Church in Laval. After his release, Del Balso allied himself with Martin Robert and Stéphane Plouffe of the Hells Angels Montreal chapter. In November 2022 and again in January 2023, attempts were made on Del Balso's life as he was in his car. In March 2023, Del Balso was a suspect in the March 15 attempted murder of Leonardo Rizzuto. Several days later Del Balso attempted to flee Canada on a flight to Italy at Pierre Elliott Trudeau International Airport but was arrested and his passport was confiscated; he was released without being charged. This was days after Del Balso's home and the homes of three members of the Hells Angels Montreal chapter were searched as part of an investigation by the National Organized Crime Repression Squad (ENRCO) into alleged drug trafficking.

On June 5, 2023, Del Balso was murdered inside his car in the parking lot of the Monster gym. Del Balso had been meeting two Hells Angels leaders at the gym. The murder weapon was a long rifle, which is an unusual weapon as most gangland murders in Montreal are done using handguns. The marksman fired at a distance of 90 meters. A Montreal policeman stated: "The way in which Francesco Del Balso was killed is unusual, to say the least. With this way of doing things, we are at another level. The sponsor wanted to be sure that the crime would be committed efficiently and without any mistakes. Maybe he put a lot of money into it. If so, the question to ask is: who can afford this?"

== Books ==
- Cédilot, André; Noël, André (2011). Mafia Inc. The Long, Bloody Reign of Canada's Sicilian Clan. Toronto: Random House of Canada. ISBN 9780307360410.
- Edwards, Peter; Nicaso, Antonio (2015). Business Or Blood Mafia Boss Vito Rizzuto's Last War. Toronto: Random House of Canada. ISBN 978-0-345-81376-3.
