= Salvatore Calautti =

Italo-Canadian mobster

Salvatore "Sam" Calautti (Italian: [salvaˈtoːre kalaˈutti]; 1971/72 – 12 July 2013), was an Italian-Canadian hitman for the Calabrian-based Mafia organization 'Ndrangheta, based in Toronto and Woodbridge, Ontario, Canada. The organization rivals the Sicilian Rizzuto crime family.

== Life and criminal activities ==
Calautti was a father of three, restaurant owner and heavy gambler, employed by the 'Ndrangheta since he was a teenager when he worked as a debt collector who was known for his short temper and "always carrying a gun". Calautti had no fixed loyalties as a hitman and worked for three of Toronto's seven 'Ndrangheta families. The journalists Peter Edwards and Antonio Nicaso wrote that Calautti was a diminutive, overweight man who did not stand out as physically dominating in the same way that the tall and muscular Gaetano Panepinto did, but that "...out-of-shape mobsters are sometimes the most dangerous, as they are the most likely to start shooting when threatened or irritated. Despite his pudgy, short frame, Calautti commanded fear". Calautti was greatly hated by restaurant suppliers for his tendency to not pay his bills along with his practice of making an implicit threat by placing a handgun on his desk when confronted with a demand to pay for the products he had purchased.

Calautti is connected to the murders of Giovanni Costa in 1991, who was gunned down near his home in Vaughan, and Francesco Loiero in 1996, owner of Rustic Bakery in Toronto who was shot to death while sitting in his car in a Vaughan parking lot. Found on Loiero's corpse were $5,000 in cash, a ring worth $10,000, and a Rolex watch worth $25,000. Given the value of the goods left on his corpse, robbery was excluded as a motive, and it is believed that Calautti killed Loiero because it was rumoured that he was a police informant. Loiero had been eating diner with his family on a Sunday evening when he received a call for an emergency meeting in the parking lot of a mall; half an hour later, his corpse was found in his van with multiple gunshot wounds to the head fired at close range.

In 1997, Calautti was accused of the murder of Giuseppe Congiusta, who was shot nine times as he got out of his car outside of a Toronto social club, but was acquitted the following spring when the jury found Calautti not guilty after a witness gave a description of the gunman that did not match him. In October 2000, Calautti was suspected for the revenge murder of Vito Rizzuto's former ally Gaetano "Guy" Panepinto, in a drive-by shooting while he drove his Cadillac in Toronto after Calautti's close associates Domenic Napoli and Antonio Oppedisano disappeared in March of that year due to conflict with Panepinto over gambling territory. Napoli, an Italian immigrant had boarded with Calautti when he first arrived in Canada. As a hitman, Calautti enjoyed challenging targets to assassinate, and he embraced the opportunity to kill Panepinto, who was normally well guarded and was considered to be a difficult man to kill. The fact that Panepinto had killed Napoli provided additional motivation for him to take the assignment. Just before 8:00 p.m. on 3 October 2000, Panepinto had stopped his car for a traffic light on Bloor Street West when a van pulled up beside him while Calautti opened fire first with a shotgun, and then a machinegun, putting six bullets along the shotgun pellets into his body. As Panepinto's Cadillac drifted into the intersection with a corpse at the helm, the van with Calautti sped away.

A gambling addict, Calautti lost $200,000 via the Platinum SportsBook gambling website. The major owners of the Platinum SportsBook were the Rizzuto family, the London, Ontario chapter of the Hells Angels, and a number of Mafiosi from York Region. With characteristic rudeness, Calautti had told his creditors to "go fuck yourself!" when pressed for paying his debts. The gangster Michele "The American" Modica, a former member of the Gambino crime family of New York, who had been deported from both the United States and Canada to his native Italy, outranked Calautti and was assumed to be responsible for Calautti's debts. Edwards and Nicaso wrote: "A string of meetings followed, in which senior mobsters resembled harried schoolteachers trying to decide what to do with a particularly troublesome student". On April 9, 2004, a meeting was held at the Marriott Courtyard Hotel in Woodbridge to discuss the question of Calautti's debts. Modica proposed that Calautti pay the principle while the interest be written off. Calautti stated that he already paid the principle to Modica, which led to suspicions that Calautti was telling the truth and that Modica had cheated both Calautti and his creditors. Hostilities also developed between Modica and former associate Pietro Scarcella, to whom Modica owed partial payment of $130,000 to with the balance being owed to the Hells Angels. Modica was later deported to Sicily. This led to the April 21, 2004, attempted assassination of Modica in a North York California Sandwiches shop, leaving an innocent victim, mother of three children, Louise Russo paralyzed, while Modica and his associates escaped unscathed. Calautti, however, was not one of the shooters in the attempted assassination. The matter of Calautti's debt was still not settled as the responsibility for paying the debt was assumed by Salvatore Coluccio of the Coluccio 'ndrina while the debt was now owed to Francesco Del Balso of the Rizzuto family. In October 2006, Calautti's debt was the subject of a meeting at Woodbridge restaurant attended by Frank Aracdi, Lorenzo "The Skunk" Giorando and Giuseppe Fetta of the Rizzuto family while Antonio Coluccio represented the Coluccio family. Since Calautti was still unwilling to pay his debts, it was arranged that the Coluccios would pay his debts in exchange for him committing a murder for them.

Calautti was also investigated in the November 2010 homicide of Nicolo Rizzuto, who was shot dead by a sniper while in the kitchen of his Montreal mansion after police saw one of Calautti's longtime associates in Montreal the day after Rizzuto's death.

== Death ==
Calautti was shot dead at the age of 41 in his BMW X6 around 1:00 a.m. on 12 July 2013 outside the Terrace Banquet Hall in Vaughan after attending the stag of a local bookie where up to 500 people were in attendance. His associate James Tusek was also killed. At about 1:00 a.m., Calautti and Tusek were getting into Calautti's automobile when both men were shot dead at close range in a manner that they suggested they knew the killer. A policeman stated: "It's hard to think someone snuck up on him. Sam was the type of guy who always carried a gun". The corpses were not discovered until 15 minutes after the shootings. Calautti had frequently boasted within the underworld circles that he was the man who had killed Nicolo Rizzuto in 2010, and it is generally believed that Vito Rizzuto ordered his murder to avenge his father. Calautti's funeral was not well attended with no 'Ndrangheta bosses attending the funeral, which suggested that he was in disfavor at the time of his killing. One policeman told the media: "They all stayed away because they don't want to be associated with him".

== See also ==
- List of unsolved murders (2000–present)

== Books ==
- Edwards, Peter; Nicaso, Antonio (2015). Business Or Blood Mafia Boss Vito Rizzuto's Last War. Toronto: Random House of Canada. ISBN 978-0-345-81376-3.
