= Giuseppe Basile =

Italian politician

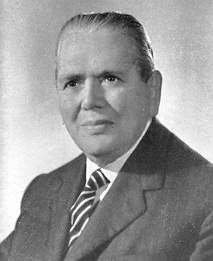
Giuseppe Basile

Giuseppe Basile (1 December 1886, San Filippo del Mela - 24 January 1977) was an Italian politician. He was elected member of the Chamber of Deputies in 1948. He represented the Monarchist National Party from 1948 to 1958 and the Italian Democratic Party of Monarchist Unity from 1963 to 1968.
