= Paolo Renda =

Italian-Canadian mobster

- Born: September 10, 1939; Cattolica Eraclea, Sicily, Kingdom of Italy
- Disappeared: May 20, 2010 (aged 70); Saint-Leonard, Quebec, Canada
- Status: Missing for 16 years, 4 months and 16 days; declared dead on September 2, 2018 (aged 78)
- Citizenship: Canadian
- Occupations: Mobster, consigliere
- Spouse: Maria Rizzuto (m. 1964)
- Relatives: Nicolo Rizzuto (father-in-law); Vito Rizzuto (brother-in-law)
- Allegiance: Rizzuto crime family
- Convictions: Conspiracy to commit arson (1972); Possession of proceeds of a crime (2008)
- Penalty: Four years' imprisonment; served two years and nine months Served two years' imprisonment

Paolo Renda (Italian: [ˈpaːolo ˈrɛnda]; September 10, 1939 – disappeared May 20, 2010, later declared dead September 2, 2018) was a Sicilian-Canadian mobster who served as consigliere of the Rizzuto crime family based in Montreal, Quebec, Canada, who has not been seen since May 2010.

== Biography ==
Renda was born on September 10, 1939, in Cattolica Eraclea, Sicily. He came from an important Mafia clan as his father, Calogero Renda, was married to Domenica Manno, the daughter of a locally powerful Mafia boss. Calogero Renda was a cousin to Vito Rizzuto Sr., the father of Nicolo Rizzuto, who was murdered in the United States in 1933. The elder Renda had moved with the elder Rizzuto to New York in 1924, but then went to Argentina and returned to Italy in 1936 where he married Domenica. Paolo immigrated to Canada in 1954 and married Vito Rizzuto's sister Maria on September 5, 1964. The same year, he became a Canadian citizen. In 1972, Renda was sentenced to four years for conspiring to commit arson of his hair salon in Boucherville in 1968 with the intention of defrauding insurers; he served two years and nine months of the sentence.

Shortly after the murder of Paolo Violi in 1978, an arrest warrant was issued for Renda, who subsequently fled to Venezuela but returned to Montreal when the warrant was dismissed. The police believed that Renda's father, Calogero, had planned Violi's murder. He then became a consigliere for the Rizzuto family. In the 1980s, Renda ran the illegal gambling houses in Montreal for the Rizzuto family. Renda lived on the "Mafia Village" district on Gouin Boulevard with his house located between the houses owned by Nicolo Rizzuto on one side and his son Vito Rizzuto on the other. A Montreal police reported noted: "It is interesting to note that these properties on Antoine-Berthelet Avenue are part of a real estate development created and managed by Paolo Renda and that the majority of the lots and homes have been sold to persons suspected of criminal activity". When Gaetano Panepinto, the Rizzuto family's Ontario agent, was murdered in October 2000, Renda along with Vito, Rocco Sollecito and Francesco Arcadi were part of the delegation that attended his funeral on October 10, 2000 in Toronto. During the funeral service, the Rizzuto delegation were observed speaking with the leaders of several Ontario outlaw biker gangs who also attended the funeral. Renda was a regular of the Consenza Social Club where he usually spoke with Vito and Francesco Arcadi. He was the owner of a construction company, Renda Construction, and the co-owner of a funeral home, the Loreto. Along with Vito, Renda was also a major shareholder in BT Céramique, a firm which laid the tiles for the federal ministry of justice in Ottawa with the American embassy and the Casino de Montreal. The firm of BT Céramique was later found to have engaged in tax fraud in a hostile audit by the Canada Revenue Agency with the firm not paying hundreds of thousands in sales taxes due to the federal government.

The journalists Peter Edwards and Antonio Nicaso wrote about Renda: "He could easily have passed for an accountant, which was appropriate since he was the keeper of financial secrets for Vito's family: he knew who was paying what to tom in the lucrative construction industry; he oversaw gambling in family-controlled bars and cafés...He carried himself with a Zenlike air of casual success and often appeared at the Consenza Social Club in a stylist sports jacket and open business shirt...". After Rizzuto was arrested in 2004, a committee of caretaker leaders for Vito Rizzuto was formed of Renda, Nicolo Rizzuto, Rocco Sollecito, Francesco Arcadi, Lorenzo Giordano and Francesco Del Balso. Between 2004 and 2006, Renda was recorded as visiting the Consenza Social Club 667 times. of the four members of the "executive committee", Renda was the least talkative. Several times, Renda was recorded as criticizing Lorenzo Giordano for his heavy drinking and his tendency to engage in rash, violent acts, saying he was likely to "attract attention". Renda was especially critical of the incident in April 2004 where Giordano shot an Iranian drug dealer, Javad Mohammad Nozarian, at the Globe restaurant in public as showing bad judgement on his part. On 23 May 2005, a wiretap recorded Rocco Sollecito telling Beniamino Zappia that Renda was one of the five members of the Rizzuto family who along with Nicolo Rizzuto; Vito Rizzuto; Francesco Arcadi; and himself were only entitled to the first claim on any profits made by the family. On 22 November 2005, Renda was recorded telling Francesco Del Balso that he needed to "talk" to a real estate agent Félix Plyas about his claims that a Montreal businessman was linked to the Mafia. In response, Del Balso made a threatening phone call to Plyas telling him that he could not use "our name" as "we don't want that".

During the four-year Royal Canadian Mounted Police investigation known as Project Colisée, the RCMP penetrated the group's inner sanctum by hiding cameras in the Consenza Social Club where the leaders had business. Renda was videotaped going into the Consenza Social Club 668 times between 2004 and 2006. On 15 March 2006, Francesco Del Balso reported about his efforts to recover money from a failed financer, John Xanthoudakis. Del Balso began by saying "I wanna take care of it, but it's just-" when Renda interrupted to admonish him "yes, but not this way. I'm sorry, you have to tell me, 'yes' or 'no'". On 30 August 2006, Domenico Marci, a Rizzuto family soldier, was killed in a case of mistaken identity with the real target being Arcadi. Renda was one of the Rizzuto family leaders who attended an emergency meeting to discuss what to do in response, where he pressed for patience from the younger leaders such as Lorenzo Giordano. During the meeting, Renda advised Arcadi to return to Italy, saying to him: "See, what you gota do now, find an island, take your wife and leave". After Marci's murder, Renda was always seen in public with at least five bodyguards.

Renda was arrested on November 22, 2006, along with dozens of others including Nicolo Rizzuto, Rocco Sollecito, Francesco Arcadi, Lorenzo Giordano and Francesco Del Balso, as part of Project Colisée. Renda was held at the Rivière des Praires jail while awaiting trial where he shared the same wing with Nicolo Rizzuto. On October 23, 2007, a series of coordinated police raids took place in Italy, France and Switzerland where banks worth €500 million (the equivalent to CA$700 million) were frozen where companies and properties worth US$212 million were seized with the police forces stating that Renda had running from Montreal a complex money laundering operation in Europe. In connection with the investigation, the Italian government issued extradition requests with Canada for Nicolo Rizzuto, Renda, Sollecito and Arcadi. Colonel Paolo La Forgia of the Direzione Investigativa Antimafia told the media: "From prison, they pulled the strings of their Italian colonies".

On September 18, 2008, Renda pleaded guilty to two counts of possessing profits from organized crime. He was released on parole in February 2010.

== Disappearance ==
On May 20, 2010, Renda went golfing in the morning and then went to a funeral home owned by his family in Saint-Leonard. He then phoned his wife to say he would be picking up steaks for dinner. While driving on Albert-Prévost Avenue, he pulled over for a car with flashing lights that resembled a civilian police car. Instead, he was forced at gunpoint by two men into their car. After not arriving home by 3 pm, Renda's son-in-law decided to search for him by tracing his usual route and found Renda's vehicle parked with its windows down and keys in the ignition, with Renda nowhere to be seen. Renda is believed to have been kidnapped.

Renda's disappearance is believed to be part of a vendetta for the murders of brothers Paolo and Francesco Violi of the Cotroni crime family, who were both murdered in the 1970s. Renda's disappearance occurred almost a year after Nicolo Rizzuto's grandson Nicolo was murdered, and six months after his disappearance, Nicolo would be murdered at his home. His murder is generally believed to have been a lupara bianca, a practice describing a murder where the body is never discovered by the police. Edwards and Nicaso wrote: "Lupara bianca is perhaps the cruellest of Mafia murders and was generally saved for spies and traitors, who deserved nothing better than an anonymous end in a ravine, acid barrel or pit covered in lime. A lupara bianca means no ransom notes, no body, no answers, no sense of closure, no funeral or flowers on a grave. Nothing, but loss and fear". Renda's murder was a major blow to the prestige of the Rizzuto family, and the renegade faction led by Raynald Desjardins gained in strength afterwards. Supporting Desjardins were the 'Ndrangheta families in Ontario along with his brother-in-law Joe Di Maulo, who in turn was in contact with what was described as a "Hamilton Mafia family that hated the Rizzutos" (a reference to the Luppino family who were related via marriage to the Violi family).

Renda's family tried to have Paolo legally pronounced dead in 2013, though a judge turned down the request due to insufficient proof. On September 2, 2018, it was reported that the courts had declared Renda dead.

== See also ==
- List of people who disappeared mysteriously: post-1970

== Books ==
- Cedilot, Andre; Noel, Andre (2011). Mafia Inc. The Long, Bloody Reign of Canada's Sicilian Clan. Toronto: Random House of Canada. ISBN 9780307360410.
- Edwards, Peter; Nicaso, Antonio (2015). Business Or Blood Mafia Boss Vito Rizzuto's Last War. Toronto: Random House of Canada. ISBN 978-0-345-81376-3.
