= Esteban Robles Espinosa =

Funeral of Esteban Robles Espinosa

Esteban Robles Espinosa (died 9 May 2008) was the commander of Mexico City's Investigative Police Force. He headed Mexico City's anti-kidnapping unit until 2003 and served on the internal affairs commission. He was fatally shot on 9 May 2008 around dawn by armed men, a day after the death of Federal Police chief Édgar Eusebio Millán Gómez, probably in retaliation for the recent crackdown on organized crime.
