= Rocco Sollecito =

Canadian gang leader (1948–2016)

Rocco Sollecito (Italian: [ˈrɔkko solˈleːtʃito]; June 9, 1948 – May 27, 2016) was an Italian-Canadian underboss of the Rizzuto crime family based in Montreal, Quebec, Canada.

Sollecito

== Biography ==
Sollecito was born in Bari, Italy. Sollecito was believed to be one of the "top five figures" within the Rizzuto family and was responsible for deals within the construction industry.

After Vito Rizzuto was arrested in 2004, a committee of caretaker leaders for Rizzuto was formed with Sollecito being one of them. He was arrested on November 22, 2006, along with dozens of others including Nicolo Rizzuto, Paolo Renda, Francesco Arcadi, Lorenzo Giordano and Francesco Del Balso, as part of Project Colisée. During the four-year Royal Canadian Mounted Police investigation known as Project Colisée, the RCMP penetrated the group's inner sanctum by hiding cameras in the Consenza Social Club where the leaders had business. Sollecito pled guilty on September 18, 2008 to "general conspiracy to commit extortion, bookmaking, illegal gaming as well as being in possession of the proceeds of crime" and was sentenced to eight years imprisonment, though he was released in the summer of 2011.

His son, Stefano, and Vito Rizzuto's son, Leonardo, are believed to be the heads of the Mafia in Montreal, who were both arrested and charged with drug trafficking and gangsterism in November 2015. On February 19, 2018, they were released from prison, acquitted of charges of gangsterism and conspiracy to traffic cocaine.

== Death ==
Sollecito was shot to death in Laval around 08:30 ET on May 27, 2016, while driving a white BMW SUV. He was 67 years old at the time of his death.

Sollecito's death is believed to be part of dismantling the older generation of the Rizzuto family. Sollecito's death occurred just months after the death of Rizzuto confidant, Lorenzo "Skunk" Giordano, who was shot to death in a parking lot in Laval.

On October 17, 2019, Jonathan Massari, Dominico Scarfo, Guy Dion and Marie-Josée Viau, were arrested and charged with planning and executing the murders of Sollecito and Giordano. With the testimonies of Dion and Viau, Scarfo was convicted of conspiracy to commit murder and first-degree murder of both Sollecito and Giordano and sentenced to 25 years in prison on April 11, 2022, and Massari pleaded guilty to conspiracy to commit murder of both Sollecito and Giordano and sentenced to 25 years in prison on March 13, 2023. In a statement of fact read out to the courtroom as part of his plea bargain, Massari stated that the leaders of the conspiracy were the Calabrian brothers Salvatore and Andrea Scoppa.
