= Juan Ramon Fernandez (gangster) =

Spanish gangster active in Canada and Italy (1956–2013)

Juan Ramon Paz Fernández (23 December 1956 – 9 April 2013) was a Spanish gangster active in Canada and Italy who served as the right-hand man of Vito Rizzuto, the boss of the Montreal-based Rizzuto crime family.

== Early criminal career ==
Fernández was born in Ribeira, Spain and immigrated to Montreal, Quebec, Canada with his family in 1961 at the age of 4. He never took Canadian citizenship despite growing up in Montreal and remained a Spanish citizen. As a teenager in the 1970s, he described himself as "a somewhat rebellious and hotheaded young man" with a fondness for violence. His major interests were working out at the local gym and learning various Asian martial arts. Fernández had a black belt in karate. He supported himself by robbing homes and selling stolen jewelry and credit cards to the Mafia. Initially, Fernández worked as a bodyguard and chauffeur for Frank Cotroni, but later switched his loyalties over to Vito Rizzuto, and became his protégé.

In 1977, Fernández murdered his 17-year-old girlfriend after she refused his orders to have sex with one of his associates. Putting his skills with karate to use, Fernández hit her with karate chops so savage to the throat that he cut off her ability to breathe. In a plea bargain with the Crown, Fernández pleaded guilty to involuntary manslaughter and was sentenced to 12 years in prison. During his time in prison, Fernández worked as an enforcer for imprisoned members of the Rizzuto family. Upon his release from prison on parole, Fernández was ordered deported back to Spain, but he ignored the deportation order, which the Canadian authorities made no effort to enforce. An ardent fan of professional wrestling, Fernández posed for photographs with Hulk Hogan.

== The Rizzuto crime family ==
By day, Fernández worked as a car salesman in an auto shop in Saint-Léonard, and at night as a Rizzuto crime family enforcer. Fluent in Spanish, French, Italian and English, Fernández had connections with the Hells Angels, the West End Gang, the seven 'Ndrangheta clans of Toronto and with Colombian drug cartels. The Canadian journalists André Cédilot and André Noël wrote: "A handsome, muscle-bound specimen with dark hair and a brooding gaze, Fernández turned heads wherever he went". The Italian journalist Antonio Nicaso and the Canadian journalist Peter Edwards wrote: "Fernández stood out for his movie star good looks, volcanic tempter and black belt in karate, which let him to act out his aggressions in an efficient and deadly manner". Fernández was considered to be one of the more fearsome members of the Rizzuto family and was much feared in the underworlds of both Montreal and Toronto.

In 1990, a franchisee with the Pizza Hut corporation attempted to open a restaurant in Saint-Léonard, where Agostiono Cuntrera owned a Mike's pizza franchise and did not want the competition from Pizza Hut. The Cuntrera-Caruana clan is closely allied to the Rizzuto family. The records of police wiretaps showed that Fernández frequently called Cuntrera between November 1990-April 1991 to discuss the subject of the Pizza Hut in Saint-Léonard. On the night of 12 February 1991, Fernández was responsible for blowing up a Pizza Hut under construction in Saint-Léonard on behalf of Cuntrera. In turn, Fernández passed on the bombing contract to David "Wolf" Carroll, the president of the Hells Angels Halifax chapter, who had Patrick "Frenchy" Guernier, drive out from Halifax to blew up the Pizza Hut. After the bombing, the owner of the Pizza Hut franchise announced plans to resume construction, leading for the daughter of Cuntrera to tell her mother in a wiretapped phone call on 26 February 1991 to say that the man must have had a "death wish". Fernández again hired Guernier to burn down the Pizza Hut, which finally led for the plans for a Pizza Hut in Saint-Léonard to be abandoned.

A police report described Fernández as a "mobland supervisor" and as "the classic example of an enforcer used by La Costa Nostra". Another police report described Fernández as "a mobile-type drug supplier; i.e. he operates from his vehicle and is constantly on the move, using cellphones and pagers to stay in contact with his customers". Fernández took his orders directly from Raynald Desjardins, the French-Canadian lieutenant of Rizzuto. Fernández ultimately graduated up to be allowed to speak to Rizzuto himself and was seen several times with Rizzuto in public, always being careful to walk two steps behind his boss to show him respect. Fernández was arrested after the police found in the trunk of his Jaguar automobile three kilograms of cocaine along with $32,000 in cash. Fernández was sentenced to 42 months in prison and served his sentence at the Archambault Penitentiary. On 10 April 1992, he married a French-Canadian woman at the prison chapel with the guests of honor being Raynald Desjardins, his brother Jacques Desjardins, and their wives. During his time at Archambault, Fernández was usually seen with the Hells Angels Patrick Guernier and William McAllister of the West End Gang. Fernández was allowed out on day parole, and he usually visited Raynald Desjardins and Vito Rizzuto at their mansions on Gouin Boulevard West. One policeman recalled "we had to bang our fists and put a stop to the day paroles" as Fernández was violating his parole conditions by associating with men with criminal records. Angry at being denied day parole, Fernández went on a rampage of violence and smashed his personal computer he was allowed to keep in his cell. An attempt to have him transferred to the Leclerc Institution was refused after the prison guards union argued that he was too violent. Instead, Fernández was sent to the maximum security Donnacona Institution outside of Quebec City.

Despite the status of Donnacona Institution as a maximum security prison, Fernández arranged to have strippers put on shows in his cell. Bringing strippers for a show in a maximum security prison is not allowed in Canada, but Fernández was so powerful that he was allowed to do so several times in 1994. The most frequent visitors for Fernández were Desjardins's wife who regularly drove up from Montreal to see him and Carole Jacques, a prominent lawyer and a Conservative MP from 1984 to 1993 who was later convicted of influence peddling. Fernández tried to recruit former Hells Angels hitman Serge Quesnel to pass on $50,000 to bribe a witness for the Crown at a Mafia trial to change his testimony. Quesnel felt that Fernández was not offering him a large enough bribe and reported the offer to the authorities. Together with Glen Cameron of the West End Gang, Fernández set up drug deals from his prison cell to import hashish from Jamaica into Canada. When Cameron was released from prison in 1997, he fell into difficulties with the Hells Angels who shot him in the leg and warned him with a gun forced against his face not to sell cocaine to the Rock Machine anymore. Cameron appealed to Fernández for help and he in arranged for Cameron to meet Rizzuto in the Marché de La Tour mall. In exchange for $50,000 in cash, Rizzuto promised Cameron that the Hells Angels would leave him alone. Rizzuto also imposed the condition that Cameron would have to do anything that Fernández asked him to do or otherwise he would withdraw his "protection". After his release from prison, Fernández was seen more often with Rizzuto in public.

In 1999, the government of Canada finally executed the deportation order to send Fernández back to Spain. Fernández stated that he had no intention of obeying the deportation order and told the court: "I'm going to show them how I dance". Fernández promptly moved to the United States where he settled in an apartment in Florida rented by Carmine Iacono, a well-known lawyer in the Toronto area. Fernández soon settled in Toronto where he adopted the aliases Joey Bravo and Johnny Bravo. In Toronto, Fernández took his orders from Gaetano "the Discount Casket Guy" Panepinto, the Toronto agent of the Rizzuto family. When Panepinto was murdered in October 2000, Rizzuto promoted Fernández to serve as his new Toronto agent.

== Toronto agent ==
Upon learning that Fernández was living illegally in Canada, the York Regional Police launched Operation RIP against Fernández. He was arrested in March 2001 while drinking coffee in a Woodbridge café popular with Mafiosi. On 3 April 2001, Fernández was again deported to Spain and again he immediately returned to Canada later that month. Fernández returned to Canada using a forged passport made out in the name of James Gordon Shaddock, who had been born in Toronto on 26 May 1956 and died in 1968. Fernández settled in with his girlfriend, Lori Ploianu, in a luxury condo at 4450 Tucana Court in Mississauga. Using forged credit cards, Fernández went on a maniacal shopping spree of buying up consumer electronics. Fernández told one friend over his phone "Yeah, you get what you want-televisions, whatever you want". Using his forged credit cards, Fernández purchased $3.3 million worth of consumer electronics along with $19,000 on a white gold engagement ring with five diamonds for Ploianu and $3,187 for a gold necklace for himself. Ploianu was aware that her goods her fiancé was buying were purchased illegally and was recorded asking him how much she should sell to her friend the leather couches he had purchased. Fernández told his fiancée that she should charge her friend $300 per week to pay for the luxury leather couches he had purchased with the credit card made in Shaddock's name.

Fernández was a major shareholder in the Olifas Marketing Group (OMG) that won contracts for recycling newspapers and plastics in numerous Canadian cities, namely Montreal, Toronto, Ottawa, Hamilton, London, Markham, Windsor and St. Catherines. OMG was founded in Woodbridge in 1996 by Salvatore Oliveti and the company enjoyed a meteoric rise becoming the largest recycling company in Ontario and Quebec by beginning of the 21st century as it won more contracts for recycling than any other recycling company. Fernández was often seen talking to two men who sat on OMG's board of directors, Giancarolo Serpe, the former business partner of the Mafiosi Enio Mora and Frank Campoli who was a cousin of Rizzuto's wife and had been implicated in the Penway stock swindle affair. Campoli was recorded by a police bug as telling Fernández that he could use a OMG truck to move some a cargo of tiles. Fernández was recording as telling Ploianu when she was concerned about money: "Don't worry, we won't starve. Don't worry about it. There's the OMG coming through". In a phone call to a Mafia associate, Fernández said: 'We're just working on other things. We had Spanish people from me, from Spain, for the OMG thing and if it goes through there, well, there's a lotta, lotta money there for me in there". Oliveti claimed to be an ardent environmentalist and denied that OMG was a Mafia front, but in February 2010 it was revealed in a Revenue Canada audit that the wife of Rizzuto along with his three children owned $1.6 million worth of shares in OMG. Cédilot and wrote that OMG "was blatantly unconcerned about cleanliness" and was one of the worse recycling companies in Canada.

Using the services of a Montreal lawyer, José Guede, who was a partner in the law firm of Loris Cavaliere that often defended members of the Rizzuto family, Fernández set up a drug smuggling network with Rodolfo Rojas, an associate of the Colombian drug dealer Abraham "the Turk" Nasser. The Royal Canadian Mounted Police (RCMP) recruited a Portuguese immigrant who worked as a truck driver who smuggled cocaine from Montreal to Toronto to work as an informer. In exchange for becoming an informer, the RCMP dropped the conspiracy to smuggle narcotics against the truck driver along with a promise not to deport him back to Portugal. In December 2001, Fernández attended a meeting at the Centre Callego social club in Montreal with Nasser, Rojas, Guede and the Portuguese truck driver who cannot be named because of a court order to discuss smuggling cocaine into Toronto. Fernández often spoke on the phone with Nasser who was uncertain how he wanted the cocaine moved from Montreal to Toronto. On 30 December 2001, Fernández phoned the Portuguese truck driver to say: "Okay, man, good news. Our friend [Nasser] says it's a fruit store". Nasser phoned Fernández from Colombia to say he wanted 20% of all the profits based on an agreement that Rizzuto had made with the Hells Angels Montreal chapter president Maurice Boucher in June 2000 that stated the price for cocaine was 50,000 per kilogram. Fernández complained that the agreement that the Rizzuto family had made with the Hells Angels worked for Quebec where the Angels and the Rizzuto family were the major cocaine dealers, but would not work in Ontario.

Police wiretaps showed that Fernández was upset that the members of the Hells Angels elite Nomad chapter along the Angels' puppet club, the Rockers, had been all arrested in Operation Springtime on 30 March 2001 as he told one associate in a wiretapped phone call: "I was with one of the main guys in Montreal. They'd all fucked. They're all inside. All of the Nomads are inside, the Rockers are inside". In a phone call on 29 January 2002 to the Hells Angels Steven Lindsay he stated that: "And then when Mom [Boucher] started fixing up everything, it was too late. He [Rizzuto] told 'em. He told 'em a long time: 'Mom, Mom...they're [the police] gonna come with this, they're gonna come with that. You're gonna see, they're gonna really ruin you Mom'. Then Mom said, "Yeah, you're right, let's fix it'. Then it was too late". Fernández told Lindsay that he suspected a Rizzuto family member, Constantin "Big Gus" Alvizos, of stealing $600,000 that belonged to the family. Fernández added that he was planning on killing Alvizos himself or in having Pietro Scarcella kill him. During a drive though the Kensington Market with Lindsay in January 2002, Fernández who was unaware that his car was bugged by the police, saw a Sri Lankan immigrant whom he had recently beaten up. Fernández told Lindsay: "Fuckin' piece o'shit Tamil. Shoulda seen when I slapped him last time-the blood coming out". The police observed that other Mafiosi were so frightened of Fernández that their coffee cups rattled against the saucer while talking to him.

In his phone calls, Fernández normally called Rizzuto "the old man", "V" or "my partner". On 13 February 2002, Fernández told the truck driver: "The guy we have with the grocery, the old man [Rizzuto] don't wanna deal no more...He's paranoid because of the September eleventh thing...I want to see Jimmy; everything is passed in big machines with the X-ray, with the dogs...See, my partner, the Colombians in Cali...They're ready to give us as much as we want in Portugal, but to bring it over here, this is almost impossible". On 20 March 2002, Fernández called Rizzuto to say he had an important matter that had to be discussed in person and that he would be coming to Montreal soon. Fernández was a vain man and liked to boast about his friendship with Rizzuto. By the early 21st century, Fernández was considered to be the right-hand man of Rizzuto.

On 23 March 2002, Fernández met with the truck driver/informer to say that Alevizos, whom he referred to as that "big bastard gym owner" was refusing to return the $600,000 he had stolen from the Rizzuto family and then made gestures that mimicked a gun being fired with his hands, which the informer understood as orders to kill Alevizos. Fernández told the informer he was planning to give him a Ruger. 357 Magnum handgun to kill Alevizos. In May 2002, Fernández gave the informer a sock with the revolver and bullets hidden within and told him to kill Alevizos as soon as possible. The contract to kill Alevizos ensured that the police had to arrest Fernández even though they would have preferred for the operation to go on longer as to allow the murder to take place would make them accessories to murder. The Ontario Provincial Police arrested Fernández in his car on Highway 417 outside of Toronto. A police bug within the car recorded Fernández as saying to his fiancée who was hysterical as she believed that the policemen were hitmen disguised as policemen: "They just cops, babe, just relax". Fernández was charged with counselling to commit murder.

On 18 September 2002, the police executed the Operation RIP raids arresting 31 people in Ontario, Quebec, New Brunswick and New Jersey on charges of dealing in ecstasy; GHB, the so-called "date rape drug"; painkillers; psilocybin mushrooms; counterfeit credit cards; guns; and counterfeit passports. Fernández was hit with drug trafficking charges on atop of the counselling murder charges. In the indictment, Fernández was charged with smuggling 100 kilograms of cocaine into Canada as part of a plot to take over the drug markets in Ontario in alliance with the Hells Angels. Fernández was denied bail and during his time at the Don Jail was involved in a torrid affair with a female jail guard that led to her being fired. At his trial, Rosemary Warren served as the Crown Attorney (prosecutor) while Joseph Blumenthal, an expensive Toronto lawyer who often defended Mafiosi served as Fernández's defense counsel.

Fernández was convicted on all counts and was sentenced on 29 June 2004 to 12 years in prison. At his sentencing hearing, Fernández made a point of wearing an expensive grey suit and an equally expensive open-collared black shirt as he wanted to flaunt his wealth even at his sentencing hearing. Despite his affair with the a female jail guard, his fiancée, the former stripper Ploianu showed up to offer him moral support while dressed in revealing shirt suit. Fernández laughed about the prison sentence along with a new deportation order, but was angry when he learned that all of his assets were forfeit as the proceeds of crime. Fernández insisted that he be allowed to keep all of the jewelry he purchased with forged credit cards and was very upset when he learned that the Crown had confiscated his jewelry. He very much wanted to keep his gold Rolex watch that was a gift from Rizzuto as a sign of his underworld power along with his gold bracelets and a gold chain with a cross. When the Crown Attorney Rosemary Warren stated she wanted evidence that none of the jewelry was stolen and that as far as the Crown was concerned the onus was on Fernández to prove that none of his jewelry belonged to someone else, Fernández shouted at her "It's not just a bracelet!" Justice Joseph Kenkel in his judgement stated that Fernández displayed "a level of marked sophistication in his criminal activity", but allowed him credit for the time served in jail which lessened his prison sentence by two years. After his conviction, Francesco Arcadi visited the Toronto area more often to meet various 'Ndrangheta leaders.

Fernández was sent to Millhaven Institution where he was involved in beating up another prisoner. In 2008, Alevizos was murdered and Fernández was listed as a "person of interest" as a suspect in the murder by the police. Fernández's closest friend at Millhaven was the Hells Angel Harley Davidson Guindon who served as his business partner. In June 2009, Fernández's request for parole was refused under the grounds of his "egocentricity, narcissism, grandiosity" along with his "psychopathic tendencies". In May 2011, another request for parole was refused under the grounds that "Several correctional officers witnessed death threats you made to another guard who was attempting to search you. During this incident, you seemed to flaunt your well established ties to traditional organized crime in an effort to further intimidate the guard; this implies you remain connected to the same criminal lifestyle that enabled your considerable drug dealing activities". The same letter from the National Parole Board complained about Fernández's "considerable lack of process" on rehabilitation and his commitment to "an inherently violent drug subculture". The National Parole Board ruled that Fernández was statistically more likely to reoffend if released on parole as: "A statistical risk evaluation places you in a group of offenders where 60 percent will commit an indictable offense within three years of release. This predictor is concerning in light of your significant criminal history, which includes a variety of serious drug offenses and violent crime".

== In Sicily ==
In April 2012, Fernández was released after finishing his prison sentence and was again deported back to Spain. Fernández soon left Spain to visit Panama, Ecuador and Peru to set up drug deals for the Rizzuto family to import cocaine into Italy. Going along on the trip was Pietro Scaduto of the Rizzuto family, whom Fernández disliked and referred to that "piece of shit" whom it was embarrassing to be seen in public with .

On 13 September 2012, Fernández moved to Palermo where he was picked up at the Aeroporto Falcone e Borsellino by a Mafiosi Pietro Sorci. Fernández's fluent Italian made him well suited for a mission in Italy. The carabinieri had been warned by the RCMP that Fernández had been sent to Sicily on a personal mission by Rizzuto, and he was placed under surveillance as soon he landed in Italy. Sorci took Fernández to meet Sergio Rosario Flamia, the treasurer of the Di Salvo family led by Giacinto "Gino" Di Salvo which dominates the mandamento (district) of Bagheria. Sorci first parked his car, went into inside a shop to talk to Flamia while Fernández had to wait outside. On 14 September, Sorci phoned Carmela Starita, the wife of an imprisoned Mafiosi, Lugi Scuotto, to talk about the price of fumo (Italian slang for marijuana) in Perugia, a university town known for highest per capital drug consumption of any Italian city. Sorci and Starita then talked about Fernández who was described as being an unnaturally fit and energic man who seemed immune to aging as he looked younger than what he really was. Sorci used an untranslatable Italian phrase buttana di tua sorella (literally "whore your sister", i.e someone who has done something amazing) to describe Fernández who was capable of prodigious feats of strength and stamina at the local gym. Fernández had apparently grown tired of being deported from Canada and planned to settle in Bagheria, an area well known as a Mafia stronghold. He was known as “Cosa Nostra’s Canadian ambassador". An Italian prosecutor told Adrian Humphreys, the crime correspondent of The National Post, "He was taking over in the Cosa Nostra family of Bagheria due to his tight links with the boss, Sergio Flamia." A Mountie told Humphreys about Fernández in 2013: “He is a perfect gangster".

During his time in Sicily, Fernández worked with a number of Mafia figures such as Giuseppe Carbone and the Scaduto brothers. The Scaduto brothers were Rizzuto family members who had arrived in Canada in 1990 and had been deported to Italy in 2004. Fernández was considered to be such a successful gangster with a talent for making money that most of the Sicilian Mafiosi wanted to work with him despite him being Spanish. Lieutenant-Colonel Fabio Bottino of the carabinieri told Humphreys in 2013: “Every day Fernandez was growing stronger”. Fernández frequently called a man known as "Danny" due to a court order, a thuggish "cement head" in Toronto whom continued to represent the Rizzuto family in Ontario. Fernández was fond of flashing his golden Rolex watch, which he proudly noted was a gift from Rizzuto as a way of showing that he was a powerful man in Sicily. Fernández opened in Bagheria a karate dojo where he offered to teach Japanese karate that also served as a studio where he offered lessons in Spanish dancing. The carabinieri regarded the dojo/dance studio as a front and were convinced that Fernández was still engaged in gangsterism. The carabinieri observed that in his phone calls to Canada Fernández talked much about "vitamins", "grandmothers", "snapshots", "loaves of bread", "girls", "illegal immigrants", "kimonos", "photos", and "things", which were his codewords for OxyContin, which was banned in Canada in 2012. In a Canada, a bottle of OxyContin sold for $100. Fernández was involved in smuggling OxyContin into Canada and frequently spoke on the phone with organized crime figures in the greater Toronto area and in Bagheria. A man from Hamilton, Ontario arrived in Palermo on 27 October 2012 with a briefcase full of cash for Fernández.

On 31 October 2012, Fernández was recorded by a carabinieri bug talking about smuggling OxContin into Canada saying he wanted to find some doctors willing to supply OxyContin (which was still legal in Italy) to him by writing up false prescriptions. On 29 November 2012, Lorenzo Carbone talked to Fernández about smuggling OxyContin into Canada at length during a drive in Fernández's BMW X5 SUV which had been bugged by the carabinieri. Carbone told Fernández that security at the Toronto Pearson International Airport was quite superficial as he stated it was very easy to smuggle drugs into Pearson airport without being caught. Fernández told Carbone that he was mailing OxyContin in the next shipment because: "I do not see why not...because the vitamins do not smell or anything like that". On 5 December 2012, Fernández mailed off another shipment of OxyContin from Palermo to Hamilton with Carbone picking up the shipment. In a phone call, Carbone thanked Fernández for giving him a chance to be rich. Fernández was keen to meet Matteo Messina Denaro, the boss of the Corleone Mafia and tried to arrange a meeting via a mutual friend.

Between 10 and 19 January 2013, Fernández frequently called two Mafiosi in the Toronto area where he heard complaints that "Danny" was not showing respect to the Mafia "old guard". Fernández also called the Montreal lawyer who served as the counsel for Desjardins. On 25 March 2013, a Toronto man known only as "David" due to a court order arrived in Palermo and Fernández discussed with him in English a plan to smuggle in guns from Italy into Canada. Fernández told "David" that: "I will return there in a second if something happens to Danny. They all will be killed on the same day". On 26 March 2013, a carabinieri wiretap recorded Fernández as claiming to "David" to be a "made man" in the Rizzuto family despite not being Sicilian with Fernández saying that Vito Rizzuto had waivered the usual rule in his case. Fernández claimed that Rizzuto had allowed both him and Desjardins to be promoted up to being "made men" in a ceremony presided over by Rizzuto. Fernández stated that Rizzuto "makes the fucking rules" and that "Vito 'made' me and my compare Raynauld". Fernández told "David" that: "I am good friends with Vito, but also good friends with Raynald Desjardins". Peter Edwards, the crime correspondent of the Toronto Star and the Mafia expert Antonio Nicaso, wrote that Fernández was a pathological liar with delusions of grandeur and it was quite possible that his claims to be a "made man" were fabrications designed to make him appear more powerful to his Canadian friend. It was noteworthy that when Fernández spoke in English to non-Mafiosi such as "David" that he claimed to be a "made man", but when he spoke in Italian to actual Mafiosi that he never claimed to be a "made man". Under the Mafia code, lying to people outside of the Mafia is permitted, indeed encouraged, but it is forbidden to lie to other Mafiosi. On 28 March 2013, Fernández was joined by Fernando Pimentel, a Portuguese man deported from Canada in 2006 for Mafia associations who had lived in Bagheria between 2006 and 2008. Pimentel told Fernández that day: "Brother, I had to beat people to make money". On 29 March 2013 while Fernández was driving down the streets of Bagheria, Pimental saw one street which brought back memories as he suddenly said: "This is where I fucking killed that person". When Fernández asked Pimental what he was talking about, Pimental insisted that was the spot where he killed somebody some time ago. Pimental appeared to be referring to the murder of Peter Lo Jacono who had been killed in 2008 at the location that Pimental was talking about.

== Murder ==
On 9 April 2013, Fernández and Pimentel went for a meeting with Pietro Scaduto at the Bar Diva just outside of Palermo to discuss a plan to sell marijuana in the university town of Perugia. Afterwards, Fernández and Pimentel went with Scaduto to see a marijuana farm in rural Sicily. Scaduto parked his car and got out to join in the ambush as he along with his brother Salvatore Scaduto and Giuseppe Carbone opened fire on Pimentel and Fernández with pistols. Thirty bullets were fired and Fernández fell off the car bleeding. His last words were to ask Pietro Scaduto "Pietro why?" before Scaduto finished him off with a shot to the head. The murder had been ordered by Rizzuto from Montreal who did not appreciate Fernández's efforts to be neutral in the mob war in Montreal. Carbone who later became a pentito recalled: "It was dark. We arrived at the dump and we burned the bodies with naphtha along with some tires". Carbone told the carabinieri about Fernández's murder: "'Why? Why?' I can't forget those words, They're still in my head. Mamma mia, I can't forget those words".

On 19 April 2013, Carbone tried to sell Fernández's prized golden Rolex watch which had an inscription saying it was a gift from Rizzuto to a jeweler on the Via Paolo Emiliani Giudici in Palermo for €4,000. On 20 April 2013, the carabinieri stopped Carbone on the street as he left the jeweler and asked him what he was doing with Fernández's watch, only to receive vague and evasive answers. In May 2013, the carabinieri arrested Carbone for the murder of Fernández under the grounds that Carbone could not give a reasonable explanation as how he ended up with Fernández's watch. Carbone decided to turn pentito and on 8 May 2013 confessed to the murder before two Palermo magistrates and four carabinieri. In his statement, Carbone declared: "Ramon was one where, when he saw money, he really jumped on. He didn't really care about this Mafia or that Mafia. He knocked on all doors. He tried to be friendly with anyone. He didn't understand the mentality here...You cannot be friendly with everyone". He quoted a Montreal lawyer who worked for Rizzuto as saying that "Ramon 'attended too many churches'". Carbone expanded on the metaphor as he stated: "He did not have his own church. Instead, he was like a priest that entered all churches...I know that in Canada there is a war. A Mafia war. Vito Rizzuto is involved on one side. On the other side, there is a compare of Ramon...Ramon was saying he was friendly with both of them. So he was trying to keep his foot in two shoes [tenere il piede in due scarpe]". He stated that Rizzuto had given the orders to kill Fernández in March 2013, but Fernández was so obsessive in texting Pierto Scaduto that the killers thought it best to wait 10 days as Scaduto did not want the texts to incriminate him as a suspect. Carbone led the carabinieri to the dump where the charred remains of Fernández's skeleton were found.

On 11 October 2016, both the Scaduto brothers were convicted in Palermo of the murders of Fernández and Pimentel and were sentenced to life imprisonment. In the television series Bad Blood, Fernández appears as the composite character Declan Gardiner.

== Books ==
- Cédilot, André; Noël, André (2011). Mafia Inc The Long, Bloody Reign of Canada's Sicilian Clan. Toronto: Random House of Canada. ISBN 978-0-30736040-3.
- Edwards, Peter; Nicaso, Antonio (2015). Business Or Blood Mafia Boss Vito Rizzuto's Last War. Toronto: Random House of Canada. ISBN 978-0-345-81376-3.
- Edwards, Peter (2017). Hard Road: Bernie Guindon and the Reign of the Satan's Choice Motorcycle Club. Toronto: Random House. ISBN 978-0345816108.
