= Vito Rizzuto =

Italian-Canadian mobster

- Born: 21 February 1946; Cattolica Eraclea, Sicily, Kingdom of Italy
- Died: 23 December 2013 (aged 67); Montreal, Quebec, Canada
- Resting place: Saint-François d'Assise cemetery, Saint-Leonard, Quebec
- Other name: "Montreal's Teflon Don"
- Citizenship: Canadian
- Occupation: Crime boss
- Spouse: Giovanna Cammalleri (m. 1966)
- Children: 3
- Parent(s): Nicolo Rizzuto; Libertina Manno
- Relatives: Paolo Renda (brother-in-law)
- Allegiance: Rizzuto crime family
- Convictions: Conspiracy to commit arson (1972); Conspiracy to commit murder and racketeering (2007)
- Penalty: Two years' imprisonment; served 18 months 10 years' imprisonment and fined $250,000; served five years

Vito Rizzuto (Italian: [ˈviːto ritˈtsuːto]; 21 February 1946 – 23 December 2013), also known as "Montreal's Teflon Don", was an Italian-Canadian crime boss alleged to be the leader of the Sicilian Mafia in Canada. He headed the notorious Rizzuto crime family based in Montreal, Quebec.

Rizzuto was born in Cattolica Eraclea, Sicily, Italy in 1946 and immigrated to Montreal with his parents in 1954. His father Nicolo married into the mob, and later started his own crime syndicate in Montreal after overtaking the Cotroni crime family in the late 1970s. He had several run-ins with the law but was able to avoid conviction for any major offenses until 2004.

In 1981, Rizzuto participated in the killing of three rival capos in New York City ordered by Joe Massino of the Bonanno crime family, and he was indicted by a Brooklyn federal grand jury in connection with these killings in 2004. He was extradited to the United States in 2006, and pled guilty to conspiracy to commit murder and racketeering charges in 2007. He was given a 10-year prison sentence, but was released in late 2012. The Rizzuto crime family had been in the midst of a power struggle while Rizzuto was incarcerated; his son Nicolo Jr. was killed in 2009, and his father killed in 2010. Rizzuto died shortly after on 23 December 2013, due to complications from pneumonia, which may have been induced by lung cancer.

== Early life and family ==
Vito Rizzuto was born in Cattolica Eraclea, in the province of Agrigento, Sicily on 21 February 1946. In 1954, on Vito's eighth birthday, he immigrated with his family to Canada, docking at Pier 21 in Halifax, Nova Scotia before moving on to Montreal, Quebec. Vito was the first child of Nicolo Rizzuto and his wife, Libertina Manno. His mother was the daughter of Antonio Manno, a local Mafia leader in their hometown. Vito was named after his grandfather, who was murdered on 12 August 1933 in Patterson, New York. Nicolo would later be murdered as well, killed by a single sniper's bullet at his residence in the Cartierville borough of Montreal on 10 November 2010.

Vito married Giovanna Cammalleri, daughter of compatriot mobster Leonardo Cammalleri, on 26 November 1966, and had three children. His eldest son, Nicolo Rizzuto (Nick Jr.) – named after his grandfather – was born on 4 December 1967. He was shot six times and killed near his car in the Montreal borough of Notre-Dame-de-Grâce on 28 December 2009. His other son is Leonardo Rizzuto, and the third child is his daughter, Libertina "Bettina" – named after her grandmother. His sister Maria was married to Paolo Renda, reputed consigliere of the Rizzuto crime family, who went missing on 20 May 2010. Vito's son, Leonardo, and Rocco Sollecito's son, Stefano, are believed to be the heads of the Mafia in Montreal, both of whom were arrested and charged with drug trafficking and gangsterism in November 2015. On 19 February 2018, they were released from prison, acquitted of charges of gangsterism and conspiracy to traffic cocaine.

== Criminal career ==
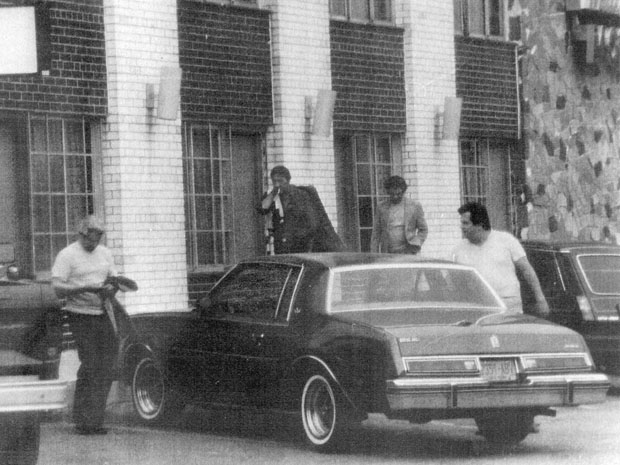
From left to right: Gerlando Sciascia, Rizzuto, Giovanni Ligamarri and Joseph Massino in 1981.

In the 1970s, his father Nicolo was an underling in the Sicilian faction, led by Luigi Greco until his death in 1972, of the Calabrian Cotroni crime family. As tension then grew into a power struggle between the Calabrian and Sicilian factions of the family, a mob war began in 1973. This led to a violent Mafia war in Montreal which resulted in the deaths of Violi and his brothers, along with others, spanning the mid-1970s to the early 1980s until the war ceased. By the mid-1980s, the Rizzuto crime family emerged as Montreal's pre-eminent crime family after the turf war.

According to law enforcement officials, Rizzuto oversaw a criminal empire that imported and distributed tons of heroin, cocaine, and hashish in Canada, laundered hundreds of millions of dollars, lent out millions more through loansharking operations and profited handsomely from illegal gambling, fraud and contract killings. In 1972, Rizzuto was sentenced to two years for conspiring to commit arson of Renda's hair salon in Boucherville in 1968 with the intention of defrauding insurers; he served 18 months of the sentence. In October 1987, a ship off the coast of northeast Newfoundland and Labrador was seized by the Royal Canadian Mounted Police (RCMP).

The RCMP found 16 tonnes of hashish in the surrounding area, and Rizzuto, Raynald Desjardins and four associates were arrested; Rizzuto was freed on bail in March 1988. Rizzuto's trial began in October 1990 in a St. John's courthouse, but when the RCMP overstepped the bounds of Rizzuto's warrant by wiretapping restaurant conversations between Rizzuto and his lawyer, the Newfoundland Supreme Court dropped the case. Later that year, Rizzuto was arrested again for conspiring to import hashish into Canada. Drug dealer Normand Dupuis was ready to testify against him for a reduced prison sentence, monetary compensation and a new identity. Before the trial, however, Dupuis contacted Rizzuto's lawyer Jean Salois with an offer not to testify in exchange for $1 million. Salois recorded this conversation and got Dupuis charged with obstruction of justice. With the witness unfit to testify, Rizzuto was acquitted in 1989. In the early 1990s, the RCMP secretly ran a phony currency exchange in Montreal as part of an elaborate sting operation, called Project Compote, ending with 46 arrests and a Rizzuto lawyer, Joseph Lagana, convicted for laundering $47 million. Rizzuto was named as a co-conspirator, but there was not enough evidence to charge him.

Though only considered a soldier of the New York Bonanno crime family by the Federal Bureau of Investigation, Rizzuto was considered by Canadian officials to be the most powerful mob boss in the country. The organized crime authors Lee Lamothe and Adrian Humphreys consider the strength of the Rizzuto clan to rival that of any of the Five Families in New York and dubbed it the "Sixth Family." Rizzuto worked closely with the Sicilian Cuntrera-Caruana Mafia clan – major illicit drug traffickers – that was led in Canada by Alfonso Caruana.

=== Indictment, arrest and trial for the three capos murder ===
In early 2004, Rizzuto was indicted by a Brooklyn federal grand jury in relation to racketeering conspiracy charges, including loansharking and murder, in connection with the 5 May 1981 gangland killings of three rival Bonanno crime family capos, Philip Giaccone, Dominick Trinchera and Alphonse Indelicato in New York City, made famous by the film Donnie Brasco. Rizzuto was one of four men hired by former Bonanno crime family captain Joe Massino to kill the three other capos. Massino had believed that they were planning a power grab after the incarceration of then-boss Philip Rastelli.

Rizzuto was arrested on 20 January 2004 in Montreal. On 17 August 2006, after a legal battle of 31 months, he was extradited to the United States, and appeared before a United States magistrate judge of the United States District Court for the Eastern District of New York in Brooklyn. Massino, who received a life sentence for murder after he turned state's evidence in 2004, was also expected to testify against Rizzuto regarding his role in the three capos murder, but Rizzuto accepted a plea bargain in May 2007 before the case went to trial.

On 4 May 2007, Rizzuto pleaded guilty to conspiracy to commit murder as well as racketeering charges, admitting that he was present at the triple murder in 1981, but stated he had only yelled "it's a holdup", while others did the shooting; he received a 10-year prison sentence and was fined $250,000, to be followed by a three-year supervised release as part of the plea bargain. Rizzuto's statement was contrary, however, to a previous testimony given by Bonanno family informant, Salvatore Vitale stating, "Rizzuto was the first mobster out from a hiding spot during the ambush and the first to start shooting." Organized crime authors Antonio Nicaso and Lee Lamothe stated of the sentencing, respectively, "It's a great deal. He couldn't expect anything better", and, "I think the system has been beaten again".

=== Incarceration and release ===
Rizzuto, who was incarcerated at FCI Florence, was released from prison on 5 October 2012, and immediately deported to Toronto, Ontario. Reports suggested that upon his arrival in Canada, Rizzuto met with representatives of the New York Mafia families, and laid low in Toronto for a while before moving back to Montreal. Sources indicated that he had bought an armoured vehicle and was living in a well-guarded apartment, suggesting Rizzuto knew his life was in danger, yet wanted to send a message that he was back and would not be easy prey.

=== Wanted in Italy ===
On 11 February 2005, an arrest warrant was issued in Rome against Rizzuto in connection with alleged Mafia involvement with plans to launder money, through Giuseppe Zappia, in building the multi-billion-dollar Strait of Messina Bridge across the Strait of Messina connecting the Italian mainland with Sicily. The 3,690 metres (12,110 ft) long, suspension-type bridge, which was initially planned to open by 2011, was expected to cost about €5 billion ($7.3 billion CAD).

=== Turf war murders ===
Several family members and associates of Vito Rizzuto died or disappeared while he was incarcerated:

- His associate Federico del Peschio was killed behind La Cantina restaurant in Ahuntsic on 21 August 2009
- His eldest son, Nicolo Rizzuto Jr., was gunned down on 28 December 2009, in the Notre-Dame-de-Grâce borough of Montreal
- His brother-in-law and consigliere Paolo Renda disappeared on 20 May 2010, also in Montreal, and is believed to be dead
- His associate Agostino Cuntrera was executed in broad daylight on 29 June 2010 in the Saint-Leonard borough of Montreal
- His father, notorious crime boss Nicolo Rizzuto, was killed by a sniper through his kitchen window on 10 November 2010, at the age of 86

Shortly after Vito Rizzuto's release, several men were killed in what was suspected to be retaliation for the hits on his family:

Drug dealers Emilio Cordileone, Tony Gensale, and Mohamed Awada were eliminated in back-to-back killings in November 2012 for their alleged implication in the 2008 abduction of a Rizzuto ally. Also in November 2012, Joe Di Maulo, an influential mobster and ally to the Cotroni family, was executed in the driveway of his home, north of Montreal — his funeral was lightly attended by mafia standards, a sign that he had fallen out of favour. Three days before Christmas 2012, a gunman entered the coffee shop of incarcerated Rizzuto rival Giuseppe De Vito, killing one man, Dominic Facchini, and critically wounding another. In January 2013 Raynald Desjardins' brother-in-law, Gaétan Gosselin, was murdered in front of his home, as was Vincenzo Scuderi, an alleged associate of Giuseppe De Vito. De Vito would later be killed by cyanide poisoning in prison in July 2013. On 9 April 2013, Rizzuto's former Toronto agent turned Palermo agent, Juan Ramon Fernandez, was murdered outside of Palermo. Fernandez had attempted to remain neutral in the mob war, which led Rizzuto to order his killing.

Salvatore Calautti and Moreno Gallo, each of whom had a falling out with Rizzuto, were murdered. Calautti was shot in the head and killed while sitting in his car in July 2013; he had been suspected in the unsolved murder of Rizzuto's father. Gallo, a former influential member of Rizzuto's organization, was shot dead outside a restaurant in Acapulco, Mexico in November 2013. Gallo had been deported two years earlier, at which time it was also believed he was targeted for execution.

== Death ==
On 23 December 2013, Rizzuto died of complications from pneumonia, which may have been induced by lung cancer, at Sacré-Cœur hospital in Montreal; he was 67. Although his official cause of death was from natural causes, there has been speculation he could have been poisoned, as an autopsy was never performed on his body. Rizzuto's funeral was held at the Church of the Madonna della Difesa in Montreal's Little Italy on 30 December, attended by around 800 people. He was buried at Saint-François d'Assise cemetery in Saint-Leonard, Quebec.

=== Aftermath ===
Even after Rizzuto's death, the Rizzuto crime family continued their revenge campaign.

Almost three years after Rizzuto's death, Pierre de Champlain, a former RCMP intelligence analyst stated that "during Vito Rizzuto's era, if everything was going well for organized crime in Montreal, it was because of Rizzuto". Subsequently, no other leader proved capable of getting the various groups in the city to work together, allowing street gangs to become more powerful. "Nobody has been able to bring together all the Mafia clans in Montreal ... the Mafia is in complete disarray. There’s definitely no emerging leader — that's why the situation is unstable and volatile".

== In popular culture ==
Mafia expert Antonio Nicaso and Peter Edwards published a book about Vito Rizzuto's final events, Business or Blood: Mafia Boss Vito Rizzuto's Last War (2015). It was later adapted into the television drama series Bad Blood, which debuted in fall 2017 with Anthony LaPaglia portraying Rizzuto.

== Books ==
- Edwards, Peter; Nicaso, Antonio (2015). Business Or Blood Mafia Boss Vito Rizzuto's Last War. Toronto: Random House of Canada. ISBN 978-0-345-81376-3.
