= Nicolo Rizzuto =

Italian-Canadian mobster

- Born: February 18, 1924; Cattolica Eraclea, Sicily, Kingdom of Italy
- Died: November 10, 2010 (aged 86); Montreal, Quebec, Canada
- Cause of death: Gunshot
- Resting place: Saint-François d'Assise cemetery, Saint-Leonard, Quebec, Canada
- Other names: Nick, Nicolò
- Citizenship: Canadian
- Occupation: Crime boss
- Spouse: Libertina Manno (m. 1945)
- Children: Vito Rizzuto; Maria Rizzuto
- Parent(s): Vito Rizzuto Sr. Maria Renda
- Relatives: Nicolo "Nick" Rizzuto Jr. (grandson); Leonardo Rizzuto (grandson); Libertina Rizzuto (granddaughter); Paolo Renda (son-in-law); Domenico Manno (brother-in-law); Antonio Manno (father-in-law)
- Allegiance: Rizzuto crime family
- Convictions: Drug trafficking (1988); Possession of proceeds of a crime (2008); Tax evasion (2010)
- Penalty: Eight years' imprisonment; served five years Served two years' imprisonment Ordered to pay a $209,000 fine

Nicolo Rizzuto (Italian: [nikoˈlɔ rritˈtsuːto]; February 18, 1924 – November 10, 2010) was an Italian-Canadian crime boss and founder of the Rizzuto crime family, the Sicilian Mafia organization based in Montreal, Quebec.

Rizzuto was born in Cattolica Eraclea, Sicily, Italy, in 1924, and immigrated to Montreal in 1954 with his wife, son and daughter. He married into the mob through his wife Libertina Manno's family, beginning as an associate in the Sicilian faction of the Calabrian Cotroni crime family, which had most of the control in Montreal. In the late 1970s, a mob war broke out between the Sicilian and Calabrian factions, which resulted in the deaths of Paolo Violi, the acting capo of the Cotroni family, and his brothers. Although Rizzuto was not charged with any of these murders, he was linked to them as the events allowed the Rizzuto family to emerge as the preeminent crime family in Montreal by the early 1980s.

Rizzuto was incarcerated twice, once in 1988 on drug charges where he served five years in a Venezuelan prison, and the other in 2006 where he served two years in jail of a tax evasion charge. His son Vito later followed him into the mob, and in 2007 was found guilty of conspiracy to commit murder as well as racketeering, serving a prison sentence until 2012. During this time, a power struggle within the Rizzuto family ensued; his grandson Nicolo Jr. was killed in 2009, followed by Rizzuto himself by a sniper rifle while in his home on November 10, 2010.

== Early life and family ==
Nicolo Rizzuto was born in Cattolica Eraclea, in the province of Agrigento, Sicily, Italy, on February 18, 1924. His father, Vito Rizzuto Sr. had been convicted on 23 June 1921 by an Italian military court of theft after he was caught stealing from the Italian army. On 9 March 1923, Rizzuto Sr. had married Maria Renda, whose brother, Calogero Renda, served as a local campiere, an estate guard and enforcer for local landowners at the expense of the local farmers. In January 1925, his father Vito Rizzuto Sr. illegally immigrated to the United States with his brother-in-law Calogero Renda, while Vito's wife Maria Renda stayed with Nicolo in Sicily. On August 12, 1933, Vito was murdered in Patterson, New York, forcing Nicolo to grow up with a stepfather after his mother remarried to Liborio Milioto.

On March 20, 1945, Rizzuto married Libertina Manno, the daughter of Antonio Manno, a local Mafia leader in their hometown. On February 21, 1946, he would father a son, Vito, who would later follow him into the mob. On February 21, 1954, along with his wife, son and daughter, Rizzuto immigrated to Canada by ship and docked at Pier 21 in Halifax, Nova Scotia, before moving on to Montreal, Quebec. He was soon able to form his own crew with help from several other Sicilian relatives and associates living in Montreal. Antonio Manno would later immigrate to Montreal as well in September 1964.

Rizzuto had ties to organized crime in Canada, the United States, Venezuela and Italy. He began his Mafia career in Canada as an associate of the Cotroni crime family, which controlled much of Montreal's drug trade in the 1970s while answering to the Bonanno crime family of New York City. He was, however, more closely linked to the Mafia in the old country, in particular the Cuntrera-Caruana Mafia clan, who came from the same region in Sicily as Rizzuto.

Rizzuto had two grandsons by his son Vito and his wife Giovanna Cammalleri, Leonardo Rizzuto and Nicolo "Nick" Rizzuto Jr., and a granddaughter, Maria Rizzuto. On December 28, 2009, Nick Rizzuto Jr. was shot and killed near his car in Notre-Dame-de-Grâce, a borough in Montreal. Paolo Renda, Nicolo's son-in-law, disappeared on May 20, 2010, and is presumed to have been kidnapped. On December 23, 2013, Vito died from complications of lung cancer at a Montreal hospital, after he had been released on October 5, 2012, after serving over five years in prison for murder and racketeering charges.

== Mob war ==
In the 1970s, Rizzuto was an underling in the Sicilian faction, led by Luigi Greco until his death in 1972, of the Calabrian Cotroni family. Paolo Violi, the abrasive and opinionated underboss of the Cotroni family disliked the family' status as a decina of the Bonanno family, and favored having the Cotroni family break away to form its own family. The Sicilian faction led by Greco was very loyal to the Bonanno family and were against Violi's plans to break away. Rizzuto, who was one of the biggest "earners" in the Cotroni family owing to his involvement in the drug business, especially disliked Violi. Violi specialized in the extortion of businesses in the Little Italy district of Montreal, and earned much less than Rizzuto. Rizzuto was enraged when Cotroni appointed Violi as his successor, whom the journalist Jerry Langton noted was "another Calabrian, and an ill-mannered and disrespectful one at that".

In December 1970, Violi's office in the Reggio Bar in Montreal was bugged by an undercover policeman Robert Ménard, who for the next five years recorded everything that Violi said in the Reggio Bar. In December 1971, a meeting was called at a cottage outside of the village of L'Épiphanie to discuss the tensions between the Sicilian and Calabrian factions with Violi representing the Calabrian faction while Leonardo Caruana, Giuseppe Cuffaro, and Pietro Sciara representing the Sicilian faction. In September 1972, Natale "Joe Diamond" Evole, the boss of the Bonanno family, sent Nicky Alfano and Nicola Buttofuoco of New York to Montreal in an attempt to mediate the dispute. Ménard's bugs recorded Cotroni and Violi discuss "getting rid of" Rizzuto and make him "disappear" from the world forever. Giuseppe Settecase, a veteran Mafiosi with a criminal record going back to 1936, was sent north from New York in another attempt to mediate the dispute, which was threatening to break the Cotroni family apart. Settecase's attempt was no more successful and instead Cotroni and Violi asked him to take a message to "the Commission" (the governing board of the American Mafia) for permission to kill Rizzuto.

As tension then grew into a power struggle between the Calabrian and Sicilian factions of the family in 1973. Cotroni capodecina Paolo Violi complained about the independent modus operandi of his Sicilian 'underlings', Rizzuto in particular: "He is going from one side to the other [i.e. from Canada to the U.S. and back], here and there, and he says nothing to nobody, he is doing business and nobody knows anything." Violi asked for more soldiers from his Bonanno bosses, clearly preparing for war, and Violi's boss at the time, Vic Cotroni remarked: "Me, I'm capodecina. I got the right to expel." The request from Cotroni and Violi to "the Commission" to kill Rizzuto was refused. However, in 1974, Rizzuto was summoned to testify at La Commission d'enquête sur le crime organisé (CECO) hearings, which led him to flee to Venezuela, which had no extradition treaty with Canada. In Venezuela, Rizzuto formed an alliance with the Corsican gangsters of Le Milieu (French organized crime) to continue the French Connection heroin smuggling network via South America. Rizzuto appointed his son Vito to handle operations in Montreal while he opened up a pizzeria in Caracas called Los Padrinos ("The Godfathers"). During his time in Venezuela, Rizzuto first became involved in smuggling cocaine. While in Caracas, Rizzuto was often seen speaking to the bodyguard of Paul Volpe, a major Toronto gangster. Rizzuto became a Venezuelan citizen along with the Cuntrera brothers, Pasquale and Gaspare, who like him fled Montreal to avoid having to testify at the CECO hearings. Rizzuto owned a nightclub in Caracas named Ill Padrone and was very involved in the construction industry.

In 1976, Ménard's recordings were played in public at the CECO hearings. The CECO hearings destroyed Violi's underworld reputation. The journalists André Cedilot and André Noel wrote: "The Mafia would never forgive him [Violi] for being so stupidly careless as to let a cop bug his place of business." The Bonnano family-which the Cotroni family was only a branch of-shifted its support from Violi to Rizzuto in the aftermath of the CECO hearings. Vito Rizzuto went to New York to meet "the Commission" and asked for permission to have Violi killed as he argued that Violi was too "stupid" to be the next boss of the Cotroni family as proven by l'affaire Ménard. "The Commission", which was deeply unhappy with Violi following the CECO hearings, gave their approval for Violi's murder. As Violi was in prison for contempt of the CECO commission following his refusal to answer their questions at the hearings, he could not be killed at first.

Instead, the Rizzutos started to hunt down loyalists to Violi with Pietro Sciara being the first to be killed. Sciara had once supported Rizzuto, but had defected over to the Violi camp, and was viewed by the Rizzutos as a traitor. On 14 February 1976, Sciara had taken his wife to see The Godfather Part II dubbed into Italian for Valentine's day. Sciara was executed as he was leaving the cinema by a hitman who used a sawed-off shotgun to blast apart his head, which caused his wife to be hospitalized as she was injured by flying fragments of his skull. Langton wrote that the murder of Sciara "become a precedent for the brutality" of the Rizzuto family, who became notorious for their contempt of the traditional rules of the Mafia which forbade killing a man in front of his wife. On 8 February 1977, Francesco Violi, the brother of Paolo who had taken over as acting boss while he was imprisoned, was lined up against a wall and executed with a shotgun. In December 1977, Violi was released from Bordeaux prison as he completed his sentence for contempt of the royal commission and become a marked man.

Just before Christmas 1977, Vito Rizzuto and Violi met face-to-face in the home of a Montreal resident for a last-ditch effort to resolve their differences, according to a police report. The peace talks failed, and most of the Rizzuto family fled to Venezuela. This led to a violent Mafia war in Montreal which resulted in the deaths of Violi and his brothers, along with others, spanning the mid-1970s to the early 1980s until the war ceased.

Although Rizzuto was in Venezuela at the time, he was linked to the 1978 murder of Paolo Violi, a Bonanno soldier who had been named acting boss of the Cotroni family. Domenico Manno, Antonio Manno's son, was also instrumental in Violi's murder. Manno received a seven-year sentence after pleading guilty to conspiring to kill Violi, as well as Rizzuto confidant Agostino Cuntrera, who received a five-year sentence in relation to Violi's murder. By the mid 1980s, the Rizzuto crime family emerged as Montreal's pre-eminent crime family after the turf war.

Rizzuto returned to Canada in the 1980s and settled on Gouin Boulevard, a section of which became a Mafia "village". Most of the grand Tudor-style mansions on Gouin Boulevard were owned by Mafiosi with Vito Rizzuto living only two houses apart from his father. Unlike Violi who relished being at the center of social life in the Italian Canadian community in Montreal, Rizzuto and company tended to keep a low profile. Closely allied to Rizzuto were the Cuntrera-Caruana Mafia clan whose operations went far beyond Montreal with the clan being active in the United States, the United Kingdom, Italy, Switzerland and Venezuela. In December 1988, a police officer stated: "Frank Cotroni's probably finished. Right now, [Nicolo] Rizzuto has the power".

== Legal problems ==
Nicolo Rizzuto was arrested in Venezuela on August 2, 1988, after investigators found 700 grams of cocaine at Rizzuto's residence. Rizzuto was sentenced to eight years in a Venezuelan prison, but was paroled after five years, in 1993, after an associate of the family delivered an $800,000 bribe to Venezuelan officials. Rizzuto's lawyers said it was due to his health condition. On May 23, 1993, Rizzuto landed back in Montreal.

On November 22, 2006, Rizzuto was arrested along with dozens of others including Paolo Renda, Rocco Sollecito, Francesco Arcadi, Lorenzo Giordano, Francesco Del Balso as part of the four-year Royal Canadian Mounted Police investigation known as Project Colisée. During the investigation, the RCMP penetrated the group's inner sanctum by hiding cameras in the Consenza Social Club where the leaders had business. On September 18, 2008, Rizzuto pleaded guilty to possession of proceeds of a crime for the benefit of, the direction of, or in association with a criminal organization. On October 16, 2008, Rizzuto was released from prison after serving two years of a suggested four-year sentence, as prosecutors could not directly implicate Rizzuto in crimes exposed by investigators.

On February 11, 2010, Rizzuto entered a guilty plea for two counts of tax evasion charges, which stemmed from a Canada Revenue Agency investigation for the tax years of 1994 and 1995. Rizzuto was accused of hiding $5.2 million deposited in Swiss bank accounts and failing to report $728,000 in interest income. Rizzuto was ordered to pay a $209,000 fine.

== Death ==
On November 10, 2010, Rizzuto was killed at his residence in the Cartierville borough of Montreal when a single bullet from a sniper's rifle penetrated the double-paned glass of the rear patio doors of his mansion; he was 86. His death is believed to be the final blow against the Rizzuto crime family. Rizzuto's funeral was held at the Church of the Madonna della Difesa in Montreal's Little Italy on November 15, attended by around 800 people. He was buried at Saint-François d'Assise cemetery in Saint-Leonard, Quebec in a private ceremony.

On July 12, 2013, Salvatore Calautti, a Toronto criminal figure, suspected by police of being the assassin who shot Rizzuto, was shot dead.

== In popular culture ==
Mafia expert Antonio Nicaso and Peter Edwards published a book about Nicolo's son Vito's final events, Business or Blood: Mafia Boss Vito Rizzuto's Last War (2015). It was later adapted into the television drama series Bad Blood, which debuted in fall 2017; Nicolo was portrayed by Paul Sorvino.

== See also ==
- List of unsolved murders (2000–present)

== Sources ==
- Cedilot, Andre; Noel, Andre (2012). Mafia Inc. The Long, Bloody Reign of Canada's Sicilian Clan. Toronto: Random House of Canada. ISBN 9780307360410.
- Edwards, Peter (1990). Blood Brothers: How Canada's Most Powerful Mafia Family Runs Its Business. Toronto: Key Porter Books. ISBN 155013213X.
- Edwards, Peter; Nicaso, Antonio (2015). Business or Blood: Mafia Boss Vito Rizzuto's Last War. Toronto: Random House of Canada. ISBN 978-0-345-81376-3.
- Langton, Jerry (2015). Cold War: How Organized Crime Works in Canada and Why It's About to Get More Violent. Toronto: HarperColllins. ISBN 978-1-4434-3255-9.
