= Cattolica Eraclea =

Cattolica Eraclea Catòlica (Sicilian) Eràclea (Greek)
- Comune
- Comune di Cattolica Eraclea
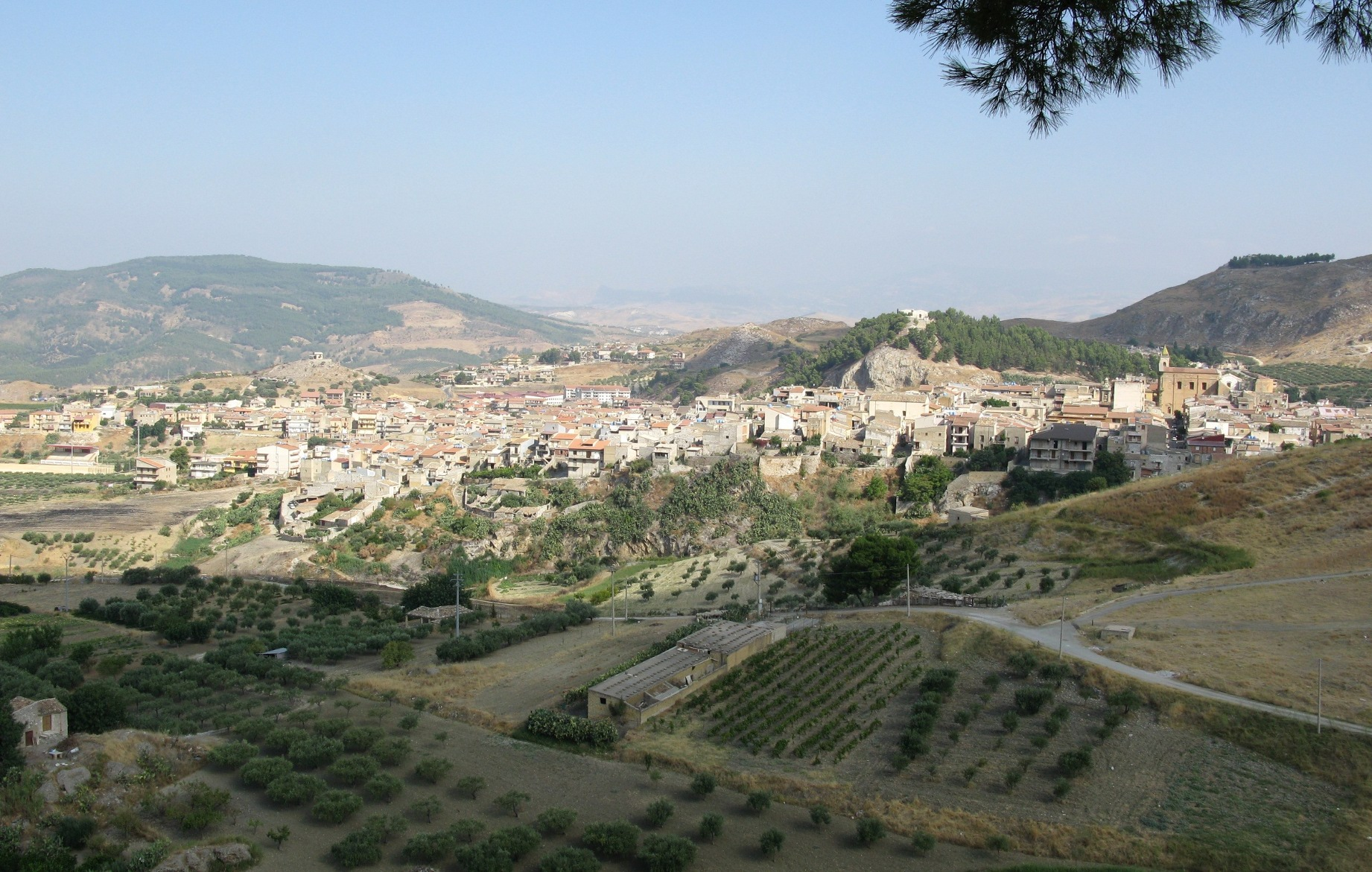
- View of Cattolica Eraclea

- Coat of arms

- Location within Italy Location within Sicily
- Coordinates: 37°26′N 13°24′E
- Country: Italy
- Region: Sicily
- Province: Agrigento (AG)

Government
  - Mayor: Santo Borsellino

Area
  - Total: 62.1 km^{2} (24.0 sq mi)
- Elevation: 220 m (720 ft)

Population (31 December 2010)
  - Total: 3,975
  - Density: 64.0/km^{2} (166/sq mi)
- Demonym: Cattolicensi
- Time zone: UTC+1 (CET)
  - Summer (DST): UTC+2 (CEST)
- Postal code: 92011
- Dialing code: 0922
- Patron saint: St. Joseph
- Saint day: 19 March
- Website: Official website

Cattolica Eraclea (Italian: [katˈtɔːlika eraˈklɛːa]; Sicilian: Catòlica) is a comune (municipality) in the Province of Agrigento in the Italian region Sicily, located about 80 kilometres (50 mi) south of Palermo and about 20 kilometres (12 mi) northwest of Agrigento nearby the Platani river valley.

The town was founded in medieval times. It received the name "Eraclea" in 1874, associating it to the ancient site of Heraclea Minoa nearby.

The economy is based on agriculture, including production of vine, olives, agrumes, fruit, almonds, cereals and wheat.
