= Patrick DeFilippo =

American mobster

- Born: April 12, 1939; The Bronx, New York, U.S.
- Died: November 24, 2013 (aged 74); Federal Correctional Institution, Terre Haute, Indiana, U.S.
- Other name: "Patty from the Bronx"
- Occupation: Mobster
- Children: 4
- Allegiance: Bonanno crime family
- Convictions: Racketeering, conspiracy, extortion, illegal gambling, bookmaking, and loan sharking (2006)
- Penalty: 35 years' imprisonment (2006)

Patrick "Patty from the Bronx" DeFilippo (April 12, 1939 — November 24, 2013) was an American mobster who was a caporegime in the Bonanno crime family. He operated from the Bronx and controlled a large illegal gambling ring.

== Bonanno member ==
DeFilippo became a made man sometime in the 1970s, though his involvement with the family dates back much farther. His father Vito was a high-ranking Sicilian-born member of the family and a close associate of Joe Bonanno. During the war of the 1960s, Patty served as a driver and bodyguard to Joe's son, Salvatore Bonanno. During this time, the younger Bonanno was detained in Montreal, Quebec, Canada along with both Patty and Vito DeFilippo and several other associates. The group was alleged to have met with the family's powerful Canadian faction and attended the wedding of Vito Rizzuto. He was an acting capo during the induction ceremony of Vincent Basciano because capo Charles Musillo was incarcerated at the time. In the 1980s, Patty was promoted to caporegime under reputed family leaders Philip "Rusty" Rastelli and Joseph "Big Joe" Massino. DeFilippo's early criminal activities included labor and construction racketeering, extortion, loansharking, illegal gambling, and bookmaking.

== Bonanno rivalry ==
Reportedly a Bronx faction leader of the Bonanno crime family since the 1980s, DeFilippo was also an associate of capo Dominick "Sonny Black" Napolitano, whom he supported during the Bonanno internal rivalries. In 1981, Napolitano and Massino gained control of the family by murdering renegade capos Alphonse "Sonny Red" Indelicato, Philip Giaccone and Dominick Trinchera. During this turmoil, DeFilippo maintained good relations with both Napolitano and Massino.

While in the 1990s operating illegal poker machines in the Bronx faction along with reputed soldier Vincent "Vinny Gorgeous" Basciano, Massino became the absolute powerhouse in the Bonanno crime family and reportedly brought the family back in the Commission.

== Murdering Sciascia ==
In 1999, DeFilippo murdered Bonanno capo Gerlando Sciascia. Over the past few years, Massino had grown tired of Sciascia's constant complaints about Massino's leadership and about capo Anthony "T.G." Graziano, a close associate. Massino finally ordered DeFilippo and soldier John Spirito to kill Sciascia. Massino ordered Sciascia to meet with DeFilippo in the Bronx to discuss Graziano. On March 18, 1999, at the dinner, DeFilippo told Sciascia that they were driving to a different location and the three men entered Spirito's SUV. As Spirito drove the vehicle, DeFilippo shot Sciascia four times with a silenced gun. The gunmen then drove to a deserted Bronx street, where they left the body on the road. A passerby saw the dumping and immediately called the police.

== Indictments and prison ==
In 2000, New York Police Department (NYPD) agents infiltrated DeFilippo's crew and started gathering evidence on its illegal gambling and loansharking operations as part of a two-year investigation. On November 12, 2002, DeFilippo along with soldiers Emmanuel Guarana, Anthony Frascone and John Spirito and associates Anthony Siano and Russell Trucco and 14 others were arrested and charged with running three separate gambling rings that brought in about $100,000 each month. One of those arrested was Margaret Frascone, the legally blind 83-year-old mother of Bonanno soldier Anthony "The Hat" Frascone and DeFilippo's godmother. She was charged with a misdemeanor for helping the crew collect gambling profits.

On August 14, 2003, Massino, underboss Salvatore Vitale, and many other Bonanno members were arrested and indicted on charges ranging from labor and construction racketeering, to extortion and loansharking, to murder and conspiracy. DeFilippo was charged with conspiracy in ordering the 1999 Sciascia murder, racketeering, extortion, loansharking, and illegal gambling. Soon, both Massino's and Vitale agreed to become government witnesses.

On one occasion while in prison, Massino received a visit from mob lawyer Thomas Lee with a message from acting boss Basciano. According to Lee, Basciano wanted permission to "jocko", or kill, DeFilippo. However, neither Lee or Basciano knew that Massino was recording the conversation for the government. Basciano was later indicted on charges of murder and conspiracy, and Lee with conspiracy to commit murder. Acting capo Salvatore "Sal the Ironworker" Montagna became the new acting boss of the Bonanno crime family.

In 2006, DeFilippo was convicted of racketeering, but exonerated of murder. He was sentenced to 35 years in prison.

DeFilippo was incarcerated at the Federal Correctional Institution (FCI) in Terre Haute, Indiana with a projected release-date of June 25, 2038, effectively a life sentence.

DeFilippo died on November 24, 2013, at age 74.
