= Rizzuto crime family =

Italian-Canadian crime family

- Founded: c. 1970s
- Founder: Nicolo Rizzuto
- Founding location: Montreal, Quebec, Canada
- Years active: c. 1970s–present
- Territory: Primarily Greater Montreal, with additional territory throughout Quebec and Southern Ontario
- Ethnicity: Italians as "made men" and other ethnicities as associates
- Activities: Racketeering, drug trafficking, illegal gambling, loan sharking, extortion, weapons trafficking, murder
- Allies: Bonanno crime family (formerly); Cuntrera-Caruana Mafia clan; Musitano crime family; Hells Angels MC; West End Gang; Independent Soldiers
- Rivals: Bonanno crime family; Cotroni crime family; Luppino crime family; Siderno Group : Commisso 'ndrina

The Rizzuto crime family (Italian: [ritˈtsuːto]) is an Italian Canadian crime family based in Montreal, Quebec, whose organized crime activity covers most of southern Quebec and Ontario. The United States Federal Bureau of Investigation (FBI) considers the family a faction of the Bonanno crime family of New York City, while Canadian and most other international law enforcement agencies recognize the organization as an independent family. The Rizzuto family is sometimes referred to as the Sixth Family.

Nicolo Rizzuto, a Sicilian immigrant from Cattolica Eraclea, established the organization in the 1970s as part of the Sicilian faction of the Montreal-based Cotroni crime family. An internal war within the Cotroni family broke out by the late 1970s which resulted in the death of acting captain Paolo Violi and his brothers, allowing the Rizzutos to overtake the Cotronis as the city's preeminent crime family. Nicolo subsequently earned the monikers the "Canadian Godfather" and "boss of the Mafia in Canada" from international organized crime expert Antonio Nicaso.

Nicolo's son Vito was imprisoned between 2007 and 2012 for murders in which he participated in 1981, causing a power struggle among criminals in Montreal. During his imprisonment, his son Nicolo Jr. was killed in 2009 and Nicolo Sr. was shot by a sniper while in his home in 2010. Upon Vito's release, several people were killed in what was suspected to be retaliation for the murders of his family. Vito died of natural causes in 2013, and the head of the Rizzuto family is now assumed to be his son Leonardo.

== History ==
=== Overtaking of the Cotroni family ===
Nicolo Rizzuto married Libertina Manno during the early 1940s, the daughter of a Sicilian Mafia leader, Antonio Manno. Rizzuto immigrated with his family to Montreal in 1954 from Cattolica Eraclea.

In the 1970s, Rizzuto was an underling in the Sicilian faction, led by Luigi Greco until his death in 1972, of the Calabrian Cotroni crime family. As tensions continued to grow into a power struggle between the Calabrian and Sicilian factions of the family, a mob war began in 1976. In 1976, wiretapped conversations of Crotoni family capodecina Paolo Violi and undercover police officer Robert Ménard from the previous six years were played in public at Commission d'enquête sur le crime organisé, which destroyed Violi's reputation. Journalists André Cedilot and André Noel wrote: "The Mafia would never forgive him [Violi] for being so stupidly careless as to let a cop bug his place of business". The Bonanno family, to whom the Cotroni family answered to, shifted their support from Violi to Rizzuto, whom they felt to be a more competent criminal.

In 1977, Rizzuto and Violi met face-to-face in a gesture to resolve their differences, according to a police report, but the peace talks failed, and most of the Rizzuto family fled to Venezuela. This led to a violent Mafia war in Montreal which resulted in the deaths of Violi and his brothers, along with others, spanning the mid-1970s to the early 1980s until the war ceased. Antonio Manno's son Domenico was also instrumental in Violi's murder. He received a seven-year sentence after pleading guilty to conspiring to kill Violi; Rizzuto confidant Agostino Cuntrera received a five-year sentence in relation to Violi's murder. By the mid 1980s, the Rizzuto crime family emerged as Montreal's pre-eminent crime family after the turf war.

The Rizzuto family along with their allies in the Cuntrera-Caruana clan were major players in the economy of Venezuela via their holding company of Aceroes Prensados, which owned real estate, ranches, trucking companies, factories, hotels, shipping, service providers and building contractors whose assets in Venezuela in the 1980s were worth $500 million. Nicolo's son, Vito, later followed him into the Mafia. He kept a low profile, working only with trusted people close to the family. They worked with the Cuntrera-Caruana clan, Colombian and Venezuelan drug cartels, and the Bonanno crime family in New York City. Gerlando Sciascia was a Bonanno caporegime that served as a representative for the Rizzutos. Rizzuto was the mediator who oversaw the peace among the Hells Angels, the Mafia, street gangs, Colombian cartels, and the Irish mobs such as the West End Gang. The Rizzuto family lived in a Mafia "village" along a section of Gouin Boulevard, where most of the imposing Tudor-style mansions were owned by Mafiosi. The Rizzuto family and their allies in the Cuntera-Caruana clan were more cosmopolitan than the Cotroni family as Peter Edwards, the crime correspondent of the Toronto Star noted they lived "...on a grandiose international scale, driving BMW 732i's and Mercedes-Benz 500SELs and owning English country mansions with names such as Broomfield Manor and The Hook. Their children kept away from the old neighborhood, and attended well-heeled private schools such as Selwyn House with the offspring of more mainstream capitalists".

In the 1980s, Vito's French-Canadian right-hand man, Raynald Desjardins, along with Gerald Hiscock and Michel Routhier were involved in smuggling drugs via Newfoundland. Taking advantage of the high unemployment rate in the Newfoundland fishing industry, the Rizzuto family employed the fishermen to use their boats to smuggle drugs from Turkey into Montreal with the fishermen being paid between $17,000 and $25,000 per voyage. In October 1987, the Royal Canadian Mounted Police seized one fishing boat, the Charlotte Louise that was carrying 17 tons of Turkish hashish. Vito Rizzuto, Desjardins, Hiscock and Rothier were all charged with conspiracy to smuggle drugs, but the judge at the trial excluded much of the wiretap evidence. The trial ended in an acquittal for all of the accused on November 8, 1990. In 1995, a document from the Service de police de la Ville de Montréal stated: "If sold on the street the cocaine, hashish, marijuana and heroin seized in Canada in 1993 alone would have earned criminals between $1.5 and $4 billion. Amounts seized correspond to about 10 percent of imports". The same document estimated that Quebec organized crime groups made profits of $30 billion in 1993 with the Mafia and the Hells Angels taking the largest share. Between 1988 and 1995, Quebec-based organized crime groups were responsible for 90 percent of all the cocaine and hashish seized in Canada.

Canadian Mafia journalists Lee Lamothe and Adrian Humphreys dubbed the Rizzuto clan the Sixth Family to describe them on an equal footing with the Five Families of Cosa Nostra in New York. According to the book The Sixth Family:

By 2003, the Rizzuto organization was variously listed in FBI and DEA files as merely 'the Canadian crew of the Bonanno Family' or the 'Montreal faction of the Bonannos.' The reality is far different. The territory under its control is huge—more than a million square miles of Quebec and Ontario directly fall under its influence, an area larger than one-quarter the size of the entire United States. It includes major cities, the busiest border crossings between the U.S. and Canada, and many mature Mafia clans that are, by and large, cooperating under the Sixth Family's banner. Where American Mafia bosses controlled criminal activity in portions of a city or a New York borough or the criminal activity in an industrial or commercial sector—such as construction or New York's garment district—the Sixth Family was an enterprise with a true global reach. The Sixth Family had outpaced any crew in the Bonanno Family and, indeed, man-for-man, dollar-for-dollar, had eclipsed the family as a whole. ... 'The nucleus of the Montreal-based Sicilian Mafia ... (comprises) hundreds of soldiers and associates,' says a Canadian police report drafted in 2004. Those who merely do business with the Sixth Family or work with them in short-term ventures are not included in this. Neither, generally, are the businessmen who do mostly non-criminal favors for the organization.

In 1996, the firm of Olifas Marketing Group (OMG) was founded in Vaughan by Salvatore Oliveti, a recycling/garbage company. two of the men on OMG's board of directors had Mafia associations; Giancarlo Serpe had been a business partner of Enio Mora. Another board member, Frank Campoli was the first cousin to Giovannia Rizzuto (the wife of Vito Rizzuto) and was a guest at the wedding in 1995 of Nick Rizzuto Jr. Giovannia Rizzuto and her three adult children, namely Nick Rizzuto, Leonardo Rizzuto and Libertina Rizzuto, collectively owned shares worth $1.6 million in OMG. In 1997, OMG won its first contract for recycling with the city of Etobicoke just before Etobicoke was merged into Toronto. OMG then took the recycling contract for all of Toronto. OMG enjoyed massive success, winning contracts for recycling with the cities of Ottawa, Markham, London, Hamilton, Windsor and St. Catharines as well with numerous school boards and universities across Ontario. On May 30, 2002, Vito Rizzuto was arrested for drunk driving in a Jeep Grand Cherokee that belonged to OMG. An investigation by journalists from La Presse revealed that Rizzuto-who had no official role with OMG-routinely drove OMG vehicles. In February 2010, an audit by the Canada Revenue Agency revealed that Rizzuto's wife and children were major shareholders in OMG, leading to the Rizzutos to sell their share to Oliveti despite his claims not to know who the Rizzutos were.

After consolidation of their power in the 1990s, the Rizzutos became over-exposed and over-extended. The first major blow to the family was the murder of their Toronto agent Gaetano Panepinto by the 'Ndrangheta hitman Salvatore Calautti on October 3, 2000. Though the murder had been sanctioned by Rizzuto who withdrew his "protection" of Panepinto (meaning that Panepinto could be killed without fear of revenge by the Rizzuto family), the fact that the family had not taken action themselves against Panepinto for unsanctioned murders damaged its image in the underworld. The journalists Peter Edwards and Antonio Nicaso wrote: "The murder marked a rare lapse in Vito's judgment and a subtle turning point in his fortunes. It would have been far better to take action himself against Panepinto if he needed to sacrifice his lieutenant. By bending to the pressure of the Italian team that visited him, Vito had further legitimized the 'Ndrangheta on the streets and undermined his own security". Panepinto was replaced as the family's Toronto agent by Juan Ramon Fernandez, a Spanish gangster who had been a family associate since the 1980s. In January 2001, Rizzuto called a meeting at a Toronto restaurant attended by members of the Gambino family of New York, the Magaddino family of Buffalo, and the seven 'Ndrangheta clans of Toronto to discuss his plans to complete his takeover of the underworld in Ontario.

=== Power vacuum after Vito's arrest ===
Vito Rizzuto was arrested on January 20, 2004, in Montreal, for his involvement in the May 5, 1981, gangland killings of three rival Bonanno crime family captains (Alphonse Indelicato, Philip Giaccone and Dominick Trinchera) and was sentenced to a 10-year prison sentence on May 4, 2007, after being extradited to the United States. After Rizzuto was arrested in 2004, a committee of caretaker leaders for Vito Rizzuto was formed of Nicolo Rizzuto, Paolo Renda, Rocco Sollecito, Francesco Arcadi, Lorenzo Giordano and Francesco Del Balso.

On February 11, 2005, the Direzione Investigativa Antimafia (DIA) arrested Giuseppe Zappia, an Italian engineer at his luxury villa outside of Rome on charges of fraud in connection with his efforts to win the contract to build a bridge to connect Sicily to Calabria on behalf of the Rizzuto family. Zappia was infamous in Canada as his firm Les Terrasses Zarolega had been awarded the contract without tender to build the Olympic Village for the 1976 Olympics at the express wish of Montreal mayor Jean Drapeau. The Olympic Village that Les Terrasses Zarolega built cost the city of Montreal $100 million, which was three times the cost projected, and Zappia ended up facing 27 counts of fraud, extortion and paying bribes in connection with the Olympic Village fiasco. Zappia returned to Italy and became a billionaire by construction projects in the United Arab Emirates, Saudi Arabia, Kuwait, and Libya, though there were complaints about cost overruns in his Middle Eastern projects. Despite this inauspicious history, Zappia was a friend of Prime Minister Silvio Berlusconi and he was favored to win the contract to build the bridge over the Strait of Messina. As part of the same investigation, Italy filed an extradition request with Canada for Vito Rizzuto to send to Italy to face charges of fraud and money laundering. Likewise as part of the same investigation, Italy had also filed an extradition request with the United Kingdom for Sivalingam Sivabavanandan, a Sri Lankan businessman living in London; with France for Hakim Hammoudi of Paris who was accused of being the messenger between Zappia and Rizzuto; and with Canada for the extradition of Filippo Ranieri, a building manager in Montreal and a Rizzuto family member.

Colonel Paolo La Forgia in a press conference in Rome stated the construction firm of Zappia International which had been bidding for the rights to build a bridge over the Strait of Messina was a front for the Rizzuto family, who had plans to launder billions. On August 1, 2003, the DIA listened as Zappia in Rome called Ranieri in Montreal to tell him: "If everything does well, I will build the bridge and when everything is finished, the friend [Rizzuto] can return to Italy. ... On one side there is the Mafia, on the other side is the 'Ndrangheta. We will make both them happy and we will do the bridge." Zappia spoke on the telephone with Rizzuto about the bridge project, which Rizzuto was deeply involved in, though Zappia told Ranieri that he could not be seen with Rizzuto because "if they see me with him, my reputation is over. You understand?". In a telephone call to Ranieri on September 19, 2003, Zappia stated: "What about our friend [Rizzuto]? I think our friend should send someone to get the money. He should send those people on motorcycles [the Hells Angels]. He has to send the French people, with the bikes". Sivabavanandan was arrested while on visit to France and extradited to Italy, where he was convicted of Mafia associations and served half of his two year sentence. Hammoudi, a Franco-Algerian man who once lived in Montreal was likewise extradited to Italy, where he received a suspended sentence for Mafia associations. Canada refused to extradite either Ranieri or Rizzuto to face trial in Italy. Adriano Iasillo, an anti-Mafia prosecutor stated in an interview with Isabelle Richer of Radio Canada that: "Without Rizzuto, it would have been impossible for a criminal organization from outside to invest in one of the biggest projects of the century. And it was here [in Italy] that this project of the century was supposed to see the light of day". Cédilot and Noël wrote: "That a Canadian, Vito Rizzuto, was the chief architect of this massive campaign to plunder Italian government funds and European Community subsidies spoke volumes about his reach and influence. This was power that not even the bosses of New York's Five Families had ever dreamed of possessing".

In 2005, a 300 kilogram shipment of a total 1,300 kilograms of cocaine, co-organized by Rizzuto family confidant, Francesco Del Balso and West End Gang member, Richard Griffin, was intercepted in Boucherville, Quebec, by police. After Griffin invested $1.5 million in the purchase and transportation of the cocaine, he demanded $350,000 from the Rizzutos for not taking preventative measures in transporting the drugs. After arguments about the debts, Griffin was riddled with gunfire outside his home in Notre-Dame-de-Grâce on July 12, 2006.

On August 30, 2006, 35-year old Domenico Macri, a Rizzuto family enforcer and protégé of Francesco Del Balso, was murdered in a drive-by shooting as he waited at a traffic light in his Cadillac car in downtown Montreal.

On November 22, 2006, the senior leadership committee of the criminal organization were arrested as part of the four-year investigation known as Project Colisée. Among the 90 people arrested, were Nicolo Rizzuto, Paolo Renda, Rocco Sollecito, Francesco Arcadi, Lorenzo Giordano and Francesco Del Balso. During the investigation, the RCMP penetrated the group's inner sanctum by hiding cameras in the Consenza Social Club where the leaders had business. On September 18, 2008, as a result of the investigation, the committee six members of the family pleaded guilty to possession of proceeds of a crime for the benefit of, the direction of, or in association with a criminal organization.

On January 15, 2008, Constantin "Big Gus" Alevizos, an associate of Panepinto before his murder in October 2000, was shot and killed outside of a halfway house in Brampton, Ontario. He was serving 3 years imprisonment since February 2007 for his role in a drug conspiracy. He was accused of stealing $600,000 from the Rizzuto family following Panepinto's murder.

On December 4, 2008, 40-year old Rizzuto family soldier Mario "Skinny" Marabella was kidnapped at a gas station on Autoroute 440 in Laval, Quebec. He was forced into a minivan and his car was later found in flames in Montreal. Marabella had several convictions for loansharking, breaking probation and extortion. In 1992, he and Giuseppe De Vito robbed a liquor truck. He pleaded guilty to possessing stolen goods and received a 90-day sentence.

On January 16, 2009, 37-year old Sam Fasulo, a convicted heroin and crack-cocaine dealer who had close ties to Francesco Arcadi, was shot and killed. In 2004, he was sentenced to four years in prison for his role in a drug trafficking ring that operated out of Italian cafés in Saint-Leonard and Saint-Michel. Fasulo was shot several times while driving in North Montreal and died in hospital two days later from his wounds.

On August 21, 2009, family associate, Federico del Peschio was killed behind La Cantina restaurant in Ahuntsic. On December 28, 2009, Nick Rizzuto Jr., son of Vito Rizzuto, was shot and killed near his car in Notre-Dame-de-Grâce, a borough in Montreal. The killing of Nick Jr. – the face of the organization on the street – illustrated the power vacuum within the upper ranks of Montreal organized crime. Since the slaying of Vito Rizzuto's son, the organization suffered other major setbacks. 70-year old Paolo Renda, the consigliere of the Rizzuto crime family, disappeared on May 20, 2010. A month later 66-year old Agostino Cuntrera, the presumed acting boss who was believed to have taken control of the family, was killed together with his bodyguard 44-year old Liborio Sciascia on June 30, 2010. After three decades of relative stability, the face of the city's Mafia hierarchy was subject to a major management shuffle. 36-year old Ennio Bruni, former Rizzuto family enforcer was shot and killed around 3:15am outside of Café Bellerose in Vimont, Quebec, on September 29, 2010. Bruni previously managed to escape an assassination attempt on his life on November 24, 2009, after he was shot three times in the shoulder and once in the back shortly after his departure from a restaurant in Laval. On November 10, 2010, Nicolo Rizzuto was killed at his residence in the Cartierville borough of Montreal when a single bullet from a sniper's rifle punched through double-paned glass of the rear patio doors of his mansion; he was 86. His death is believed to have been the final blow against the Rizzuto crime family.

Calabrese mobsters led by the old Cotroni family were among the suspects for the murders of Rizzuto crime family members. The Rizzutos dominated organized crime activities in Montreal since its inception but their weakened organization opened challenges for control of rackets in the area, especially the drug trade. An associate of capo Francesco Arcadi and Francesco Del Balso, 44-year old Antonio Di Salvo, was shot and killed at his home in Rivière-des-Prairies, Quebec, on January 31, 2011. On October 24, 2011, Rizzuto crime family associate-turned rival 40-year old Lorenzo "Larry" Lopresti, the son of Joe Lopresti who was gunned down in April 1992, was shot and killed on his ground-floor balcony and pronounced dead at the scene. Salvatore Montagna, the acting boss of the Bonanno family until his deportation to Canada in 2009, was believed to be attempting to reorganize both families under his control; however, he was murdered in November 2011.

On March 1, 2012, 38-year old Giuseppe "Joe Closure" Colapelle, was shot inside of his parked car in North Montreal and later pronounced dead upon arrival at the hospital. It is believed Colapelle worked for Giuseppe De Vito, a former Rizzuto family lieutenant who was ousted after attempting to overthrow the Rizzuto family in around 2009–2010. Colapelle allegedly served as a double-agent for Raynald Desjardins and was spying on Salvatore Montagna by mid-2011. On May 4, 2012, 53-year old Giuseppe "Joe" Renda was kidnapped and never seen again. Renda met with Antonio Pietranto and Montagna two days before the failed assassination attempt on Desjardins on September 16, 2011, Renda allegedly gave Montagna his full support in taking control of the Italian-Montreal underworld. Walter Gutierrez, a money launderer for the Rizzuto family, was shot to death in West Montreal on July 16, 2012.

Vito Rizzuto was released from prison on October 5, 2012. On November 5, 2012, Rizzuto family confidant-turned rival 70-year old Giuseppe "Smiling Joe" Di Maulo was executed by a hitman waiting outside his home in Blainville, Quebec. On December 8, 2012, Rizzuto family lieutenant 50-year old Emilio Cordileone was gunned down in Ahuntsic, near his parked car. Cordileone's murder was possibly the result of his association with Giuseppe De Vito and the Cotroni family.

On May 8, 2013, 57-year old Juan "Joe Bravo" Fernandez and his associate 36-year old Fernando Pimentel, considered neutral in the Rizzuto war, were both found murdered in a garbage dump in Casteldaccia, Palermo, his body was burnt and riddled with over 30 bullets. Law enforcement considered the hit to be ordered by Vito Rizzuto. Bravo was deported from Canada to Sicily in 2012.

On July 8, 2013, 46-year old Giuseppe De Vito, ally of Desjardins, was fatally poisoned in his cell at Donnacona federal penitentiary. De Vito was targeted by law enforcement in 2006 as part of "Operation Coliseum". He was serving a 15-year prison sentence for conspiracy to import cocaine and gangsterism charges following his conviction in 2010. His murder is believed to be orchestrated by Vito Rizzuto. On July 12, 2013, 41-year old Salvatore Calautti was shot in the head and killed while driving in Vaughan, Ontario. His associate, 35-year old Jimmy Tusek, was shot in the chest and stomach. The killing of Calautti is believed to be revenge for the murder of Vito Rizzuto associate Gaetano Panepinto in October 2000 and Nicolo Rizzuto, Sr. in November 2010. It is noted he also had ties to the 'Ndrangheta organisation in Canada.

On November 10, 2013, 67-year old Moreno "The Turkey" Gallo, a once-influential member of the crime family, was killed by a gunman inside an Italian restaurant in the Mexican city of Acapulco. He had lived in Canada throughout the 1950s but was deported in January 2013 after the Canadian government formally accused him of murder and organized crime charges. The murder of Gallo is believed to have marked the three-year anniversary of the murder of Nicolo Rizzuto, Sr. on November 10, 2010. It is suspected Gallo was killed as a consequence of aligning with Desjardins and attempting to overthrow the Rizzuto family around 2009–2010.

=== Events following Vito's death ===
Five days before the death of Rizzuto, on December 18, 2013, 54-year old Roger Valiquette Jr., a loan shark and Raynald Desjardins ally who also had ties to Joe Di Maulo, was gunned down in the parking lot of a restaurant in Laval. Vito Rizzuto died of natural causes on December 23, 2013. After his release from prison, Rizzuto had been on a revenge campaign which the Rizzuto crime family continued after his death. Several members and associates of the Cotroni family were murdered as a result.

On April 24, 2014, Carmine Verduci was shot to death outside a cafe; it is believed he was encroaching on the Rizzutos' turf following Vito's death. On August 1, 2014, 46-year old Ducarme Joseph, leader of the Haitian-based street gang "the 67s", was shot multiple times in the upper body on the streets of Saint-Michel, Montreal and was pronounced dead when paramedics arrived. Sources claimed his murder was retribution for his involvement in the murder of Nick Rizzuto Jr. in December 2009, the son of Vito Rizzuto. The 67s gang formed in the Saint-Michel district of Montreal, Quebec, Canada in the late 1980s and are associated with the Crips gang. Police believed Joseph drove the getaway car in the Rizzuto murder. It is alleged the Rizzuto family offered $200,000 for the death of Joseph. His boutique shop on Saint Jacques Street was shot at on March 18, 2010. Joseph managed to flee however his bodyguard and associate 27-year old Peter Christopoulos, and the store manager 60-year old Jean Gaston, were killed. He was arrested on March 19 on charges of assault and the possession of a firearm silencer, and he was sentenced to 10 months in April 2010.

In November 2015, Vito Rizzuto's son, Leonardo Rizzuto, along with Rocco Sollecito's son, Stefano Sollecito, believed to be the heads of the Mafia in Montreal, were arrested along with more than 40 other people, and were charged with taking part in a conspiracy to traffic in drugs between January 1, 2013, and November 16, 2015. They were also charged with committing a crime "for the benefit of, at the direction of, or in association with, a criminal organization." As part of the same operation, the police charged Maurice Boucher with ordering the failed assassination plot on Desjardins from his prison cell.

On March 1, 2016, 52-year-old Lorenzo "Skunk" Giordano, a Rizzuto lieutenant and confidant who had expressed wishes to become the next boss of the Rizzuto family, was shot to death in a Chomedey, Quebec parking lot, while he sat in the passenger side of a vehicle around 8.40am. In 2007 as part of operation 'Project Colisée' Giordano pleaded guilty to gangsterism, conspiracy and possession of the proceeds of crime. It is noted in 2009 Giordano was sentenced to 15 years imprisonment, later reduced to 10 years in prison, for participating in extortion, drug trafficking and other crimes.

On May 27, 2016, 67-year old Rocco Sollecito was shot to death while driving his BMW 4×4 vehicle in Laval on St-Elzéar Blvd around 8.30am. Sollecito was an underboss of the family and his death was believed to be part of a dismantling of the older generation of the family. In around November 2006, Sollecito was arrested as part of operation 'Project Colisee' on various charges including drug trafficking, bookmaking and operating illegal gambling dens.

On June 2, 2016, semi-retired Rizzuto family member, 72-year old Angelo D'Onofrio, was shot several times at close range inside of Café Sinatra in Ahuntsic on Fleury Street by two men.

On October 15, 2016, 65-year old Vincenzo Spagnolo, considered formerly as a mediator, messenger and advisor to Vito Rizzuto, was shot multiple times at his home in Vimont, Quebec, and pronounced dead around 5.30pm. Spagnolo was close to the Sicilian faction of the family following Rizzuto's death in 2013.

On August 17, 2017, 45-year old Antonio De Blasio, a Rizzuto family soldier and Sollecito crew member, was shot and killed.

On November 2–3, 2017, Jacques Desjardins, brother of Raynald Desjardins, disappeared and is presumed dead.

On February 3, 2018, 33-year old Daniele Ranieri was found in a ditch in Cancún, Mexico. He was shot twice in the back of the head. Law enforcement alleged Ranieri took over the Toronto crew on behalf of the Rizzuto crime family following the April 2013 murder of Joe Bravo. Ranieri fled to Mexico in 2015 following an indictment on extortion charges issued by the York Regional Police. He previously served three prison-stints for robbery, assault, bookmaking and firearm offenses.

On February 19, 2018, Leonardo Rizzuto and Stefano Sollecito were released from prison since their November 2015 arrest, and acquitted of charges of gangsterism and conspiracy to traffic cocaine. The wiretap evidence that was gathered by a joint police task force in 2015 was excluded as a violation of the constitutional right to solicitor-client privilege.

A 2019 CBC News report later quoted a Mafia expert as stating that "Rizzuto's death paved the way for upheaval in the underworld. There's a power struggle left from the vacuum from Rizzuto". On October 17, 2019, Jonathan Massari, Dominico Scarfo, Guy Dion and Marie-Josée Viau, were arrested and charged with planning and executing the murders of Sollecito and Giordano. With the testimonies of Dion and Viau, Scarfo was convicted of conspiracy to commit murder and first-degree murder of both Sollecito and Giordano and sentenced to 25 years in prison on April 11, 2022, and Massari pleaded guilty to conspiracy to commit murder of both Sollecito and Giordano and sentenced to 25 years in prison on March 13, 2023.

The power vacuum after Rizutto's death was particularly apparent to mobsters from the area of Hamilton, Ontario. Angelo Musitano, boss of the city's Musitano crime family, was killed in May 2017. In April 2019, his uncle Tony Musitano died of natural causes, leaving nephew Pasquale (Pat) Musitano as the last of the dynasty. "Those deaths cost [Pat] protection in a world where he had a growing number of enemies", according to journalist Peter Edwards. The enemies included "criminal groups in Hamilton, Buffalo, Montreal and elsewhere, including the Luppino and Papalia crime gangs," according to the National Post. Shortly after Angelo's murder, Pat Musitano's home was sprayed with bullets, and shortly after Tony's death in April 2019, Pat was shot but survived. At that time, CBC News discussed other mob hits and stated that the "surge" in violence appeared to have commenced after Vito Rizzuto's death; "the Musitano family [for example] was aligned with Rizzuto, which offered protection". In July 2020, Pat Musitano was killed.

On November 10, 2021, Serafino Olivero, an independent money launderer closely connected to the Rizzuto organization, survived a drive-by assassination attempt in Montreal's Riviere-des-Prairies neighbourhood. Olivero had been fined $75,000 by Revenu Quebec in 2018 for producing false tax returns. It is possible that Olivero had fallen from the good graces of the Rizzuto family and was targeted as a result.

On February 9, 2022, 46-year old Domenico Macri was murdered in his garage in the LaSalle neighbourhood of Montreal during a drive-by shooting. Macri was the owner of a local sports bar, named Brasserie des Rapides. Macri is believed to have been involved in the illegal sports betting business and had connections to the Italian Mafia in Montreal and the West End Gang.

On March 15, 2023, Leonardo Rizzuto was shot at six times while driving on Autoroute 440 in Laval, escaping with minor injury. In June 2023, two men were charged with attempted murder of Rizzuto.

On June 5, 2023, 53-year-old Francesco Del Balso, a longtime Rizzuto confidant, was gunned down in Dorval. As part of operation Project Colisee in 2006, Del Balso was convicted of gangsterism and conspiracy to import and sell cocaine to the Hells Angels. As a result of his conviction, Del Balso was released in 2016, reinterned and then released again in 2017.

On June 12, 2025, Leonardo Rizzuto and Stefano Sollecito were arrested along with nine other men charged with first degree murder of Lorenzo Lopresti. They were also charged with conspiracy to commit murder of eight other men. Alleged contract killer turned police informant, Frederick Silva, had been collaborating with police since 2022 that assisted with the arrest. On November 23, 2025, Rizzuto was the target of an attack in the courtyard of the Rivière-des-Prairies detention centre in Montreal, but was uninjured.

== List of Rizzuto crime family casualties and ordered murders ==
Name	Date	Reason
Gaetano Panepinto	October 3, 2000	Panepinto possibly served as a soldier or capo for the Rizzuto family. Panepinto was shot and killed on 3991 Bloor Street W in Toronto.
Paolo Gervasi	January 19, 2004	Gervasi may have served as a soldier or capo for the Rizzuto family and was believed to have been heavily involved in illegal sports gambling for the Rizzuto family. Gervasi was marked for death by the Rizzuto family for participating in money making schemes with rivals of the Rizzuto family. It is believed Gervasi was murdered by Lorenzo Giordano, or Giuseppe De Vito and Carmelo Tomasino who allegedly worked directly for Gervasi, the day before the arrest of Vito Rizzuto.
Giovanni "Johnny" Bertolo	August 11, 2005	46-year old Bertolo was shot and killed outside of a gym located at Rivière-des-Prairies in Montreal. It is believed Rizzuto family capo Francesco Arcadi order the death of Bertolo, the death of Bertolo was pinnacle for the splintering of the Rizzuto and Desjardins factions.
Richard Griffin	July 12, 2006	41-year old Griffin was shot and killed on Terrebonne Street in the Notre-Dame-de-Grâce in Montreal. Griffin was associated with the West End Gang. It is believed Griffin was killed by the Rizutto family after a drug shipment was seized.
Domenico Macri	August 30, 2006	35-year old Macri was shot and killed in downtown Montreal. Macri served as a Rizzuto family enforcer, and was possibly killed by the Raynald Desjardins faction as retribution for the August 2005 murder of Giovanni Bertolo.
Carmine Guarino	March 9, 2007	Guarino served as an associate of the Rizzuto family. 32-year old Guarino was shot and killed inside of the Café Albano located on Jarry Street in Montreal in the Villeray–Saint-Michel–Parc-Extension borough.
Mario "Skinny" Marabella	December 4, 2008	Marabella possibly served as a soldier for the Rizzuto family. 40-year old Marabella was abducted from a gas station on Autoroute 440 in Laval, Quebec, and is presumed to have been murdered.
Sam Fasulo	January 18, 2009	37-year old Fasulo died in hospital after he was previously shot inside of his car located at Henri-Bourassa Boulevard and Langelier Boulevard in Montreal North. Fasulo was closely associated with Rizzuto family capo Francesco Arcadi around the time of his death.
Federico "Freddy" Del Peschio	August 21, 2009	59-year old Peschio was shot and killed on Legendre Street and Saint-Laurent Boulevard in Ahuntsic, Montreal. Peschio was possibly killed by Ducarme Joseph on orders of Anthony Magi.
Nick Rizzuto Jr.	December 28, 2009	42-year old Rizzuto, the son of Vito Rizzuto, was shot and killed, located at near Upper Lachine Road and Wilson Avenue, in Notre-Dame-de-Grâce. Rizzuto was killed by Ducarme Joseph on orders of Anthony Magi.
Peter Christopoulos	March 18, 2010	27-year old Christopoulos served as a bodyguard to Ducarme Joseph, Joseph had participated in the murder of Nick Rizzuto Jr. in December 2009. Christopoulos was shot and killed located at the Flawnego clothing store on St. Jacques Street in Old Montreal, Canada, however Joseph managed to escape.
Paolo Renda	May 20, 2010	70-year old Renda served as the consigliere for the Rizzuto family. Renda disappeared in May 2010, and was declared legally dead in September 2018.
Agostino Cuntrera	June 29, 2010	66-year old Cuntrera was believed to be the acting boss of the Rizzuto family at the time of his death. Cuntrera was shot in the head and killed outside of his food-distribution business located at St. Leonard in Montreal. Giuseppe De Vito was held responsible as the shooter of Cuntrera.
Ennio Bruni	September 29, 2010	Bruni served as an enforcer for the Rizzuto family. 36-year old Ennio Bruni was shot and killed outside of the Cafe Bellerose on Bellerose Blvd. E in Vimont.
Nicolo Rizzuto	November 10, 2010	86-year old Rizzuto was shot by a single bullet from a sniper's rifle which had penetrated the double-paned glass of the rear patio doors of his mansion, located at Antoine-Berthelet Avenue in Montreal, Quebec.
Antonio Di Salvo	January 31, 2011	Salvo possibly served as an associate or soldier for the Rizzuto family. 44-year old Salvo was shot and killed inside of his home located at Perras Blvd. in Riviere des Prairies. Salvo was closely associated with Rizzuto family capo Francesco Arcadi before his death.
Salvatore "Sal the Iron Worker" Montagna	November 24, 2011	40-year Montagna had served as the acting boss of the Bonanno family from New York at the time of his death. It is believed Montagna may had participated in the murder of Nicolo Rizzuto, the father of Vito Rizzuto, however it is believed that Montagna was lured and killed by Raynald Desjardins.
Giuseppe "Joe Closure" Colapelle	March 1, 2012	38-year Colapelle was shot and killed inside of his vehicle located at the Beaches Pub in Saint-Léonard. Colapelle had formerly been associated with the Rizzuto family however he later defected and joined Raynald Desjardins for control of the Canadian underworld.
Steven Laporte	March 1, 2012	39-year old Laporte was shot and killed outside of his used car dealership located at Highway 117, east of Saint-Sauveur. Laporte may have been killed and targeted as his father served as a former La Presse journalist who covered organized crime for several decades.
Salvatore Silletta	March 13, 2012	49-year old Silletta served as an associate of the Rizzuto family and drug dealer. Silletta was shot and killed on Esplanade Avenue, between Crémazie Boulevard West and Beauharnois Street West in the Ahuntsic district of Montreal.
Joe Renda	May 4, 2012	53-year old Renda was last seen alive at St-Viateur Street. W. in the Plateau, and is presumed to have been murdered by the Rizzuto family. Renda may had been murdered for attempting to usurp power from the Rizzuto family. Renda was historically known for his close alignment to the Bonanno family during the late 1990s, having served as a representative from between Vito Rizzuto and Joseph Massino.
Walter Ricardo Gutierrez	July 16, 2012	Gutierrez possibly served as an associate or soldier for the Rizzuto family. 60-year old Gutierrez was shot and killed in LaSalle, Quebec.
Chenier Dupuy	August 10, 2012	Dupuy was the leader of the Bloods-Montreal gang. Dupuy was a known enemy of the Rizzuto family. It is believed the Rizzuto family had hired the Hells Angels to murder Dupuy, as the 37-year old was shot and killed at the parking lot of the Galeries d’Anjou shopping centre.
Lamartine Sévère Paul	August 10, 2012	42-year old Paul was also a Bloods gang loyalist, with his gang being known enemies of the Rizzuto family. Paul was murdered just hours after the Dupuy murder, and he was shot and killed outside of his apartment located at Samson Blvd in Laval.
Riccardo Ruffolo	August 12, 2012	34-year old Ruffolo was shot and killed at his apartment on Côte-des-Neiges Road in Montreal. Ruffolo was associated with 66-year old Vincenzo Armeni, whom was also shot and killed in October 2022, Armeni was considered as one of the biggest drug traffickers in Canada, he was released from prison in 2020 after serving 13 years in prison in connection with 250 kilograms of cocaine which was seized. It is believed Ruffolo was murdered due to owing outstanding debts to the Rizzuto family.
Giuseppe "Joe" Di Maulo	November 4, 2012	70-year old Maulo was shot and killed outside of his home on Du Blainvillier Street in Blainville, Quebec. Maulo first became an associate of the Canadian Mafia families during the 1960s and rose through the ranks during the 1970s and 1980s whilst the Rizzuto and Cotroni families waged war together. It is believed Maulo was killed for his stance on "being on the fence" without retaliating after Nicolo Rizzuto and Nick Rizzuto Jr. were murdered.
Tony Gensale	November 15, 2012	43-year old Gensale was shot and killed in North Montreal outside of a gym as a case of mistaken identity, with the real target being 33-year old Giuseppe Fetta.
Mohamed Awada	November 17, 2012	47-year old Awada was shot and killed near his home located at Leblanc Ave. near Prieur St as Awada was a Raynald Desjardins loyalist.
Emilio Cordileone	December 8, 2012	50-year old Cordileone was shot and killed inside of his Range Rover vehicle Sauriol Street in the Ahuntsic district of Montreal. Cordileone possibly served as a capo or soldier for the Rizzuto family, and was closely associated with Joe Di Maulo, whom was also gunned down in November 2012.
Domenico Facchini	December 21, 2012	37-year old Facchini was shot and killed inside of the Café Dominica on Provencher Boulevard in the Saint-Léonard borough of Montreal, possibly as a case of mistaken identity, with the intended target being 45-year old Giuseppe "Ponytail" De Vito, whom was later murdered in July 2013. Another theory of Facchini's murder was to possibly send a message to De Vito whilst he was in prison.
Gaetan Gosselin	January 22, 2013	69-year old Gosselin was a friend and loyalist to the Raynald Desjardins faction, rivalling the Rizzuto family. Gosselin was shot and killed outside of his home located at Jean Tavernier and Pierre Gaulin Street.
Vincenzo Scuderi	January 31, 2013	49-year old Scuderi was shot and killed on a street in Saint-Léonard for being a Raynald Desjardins-faction loyalist during the Rizzuto family gang war. Scuderi was associated with Giuseppe De Vito and Alessandro Succapane, and was allegedly on Vito Rizzuto's "black list". It is believed Scuderi's shooters were hired help from African-American gangs from Montreal, possibly by the Unit 44 or Bo-Gars gangs.
Juan "Joe Bravo" Fernandez	May 8, 2013	56-year old Fernandez was shot and killed near Casteldaccia, in Western Sicily, after Rizzuto ordered his death for staying neutral in the gang war.
Giuseppe De Vito	July 8, 2013	46-year old Vito was found dead in his prison cell at Donnacona federal penitentiary, poisoned to death by cyanide. Vito had served as a long time associate of the Rizzuto family, and may have been killed as he was held responsible as the shooter of Agostino Cuntrera in June 2010, the former acting boss of the Rizzuto family at the time of his death.
Salvatore "Sam" Calautti	July 12, 2013	41-year old Calautti was shot and killed located at 1680 Creditstone Road in Vaughan, Ontario, as Calautti was held responsible for participating in the November 2010 murder of Nicolo Rizzuto and also the October 2000 murder of Gaetano Panepinto.
Jimmy Tusek	July 12, 2013	It is believed Tusek was shot and killed on Creditstone Road in Vaughan, Ontario, for associating with known enemies of the Rizzuto family. In 2008, Tusek was arrested for participating in a $16-million marijuana grow-op bust in Niagara.
Moreno Gallo	November 10, 2013	68-year old Gallo was shot and killed inside of the Forza Italia, a restaurant in Acapulco, Mexico, as it was believed that Gallo had turned on Vito Rizzuto whilst he was in prison. In May 2023, Gallo's 39-year old daughter-in-law was shot and killed in Cote-des-Neiges in Montreal.
Roger Valiquette	November 10, 2013	Valiquette was shot and killed by Marco Campellone. Valiquette was associated with Stefano Sollecito, the son of former Rizzuto family underboss, Rocco Sollecito.
Ducarme Joseph	August 1, 2014	46-year old Joseph was shot and killed near the corner of Saint-Michel Boulevard and Michel-Ange Street. Joseph was the leader of the "67s gang" whom were closely affiliated with the Crips gang. It is believed Joseph was murdered as he was held responsible for being the shooter in the December 2009 murder of Nick Rizzuto Jr.
Tonino Callocchia	December 1, 2014	53-year old Callocchia was shot and killed by Salvatore Scoppa inside of the Bistro XO Plus restaurant located on Henri-Bourassa Boulevard East in the Rivière-des-Prairies borough of Montreal, as Callocchia was part of a dissident faction that opposed Vito Rizzuto. In 1996, Callocchia was sentenced to 4 years in prison for laundering around $500,000. In February 2013, Callocchia had previously managed to escape an attempted shooting on his life.
Marco Campellone	September 18, 2015	24-year old Campellone may had been shot and killed by Salvatore Scoppa located at Maurice-Duplessis Boulevard near the intersection of Alexis-Carrel Avenue in Rivière des Prairies, after he was given approval by Stefano Sollecito, as Campellone allegedly previously had attempted to kill him. Campellone had recently joined the Rizzuto faction during the gang war.
Lorenzo "Skunk" Giordano	March 1, 2016	Giordano possibly served as a capo for the Rizzuto family. 52-year old Giordano was shot and killed at a parking lot in Chomedey, Laval. It is believed his murder was ordered by Salvatore Scoppa, with the shooter being Dominico Scarfo.
Angelo D'Onofrio	June 2, 2016	D'Onofrio was shot and killed at the Hillside Cafe on Fleury Street in Ahuntsic.
Giuseppe Falduto & Vincenzo Falduto	June 30, 2016	Vincenzo Falduto, aged 30 years, and Giuseppe Falduto, aged 23 years, were both shot and killed on orders of Salvatore Scoppa located at a rural farm property in Saint-Jude, Quebec.
Steven Constantinou	October 8, 2016	Constantinou served as a Rizzuto family associate, with links to current Rizzuto family capo, Marco Pizzi, and high-ranking Rizzuto family member, Liborio Cuntrera. 22-year old Constantinou was found murdered inside of a vehicle on Paul-Émile Lamarche Avenue near Creusot Street in the Saint-Léonard borough of Montreal.
Vincenzo Spagnolo	October 16, 2016	Spagnolo was shot and killed at his home located at on Antoine-Forestier Street in Vimont, Laval.
Ali Awada	January 13, 2017	28-year old Awada was shot and killed located at North Montreal on Sabrevois and des Récollets Street. Awada's father, Mohamed Awada, was also gunned down in November 2012. It is believed Awada was killed by the Rizzuto family for settling of accounts.
Nicola Di Marco	March 18, 2017	47-year old Marco was shot and killed in a parking lot of an apartment building near M.B. Jodoin Avenue and Galeries d'Anjou Boulevard, in the Anjou borough of Montreal. Marco was possibly killed for his association with Giuseppe De Vito, whom was killed in July 2013 by the Rizzuto family.
Mustapha Danach	May 26, 2017	30-year old Danach was shot and killed inside of his apartment located at Roi-René Boulevard in the borough of Anjou, Montreal. Danach may have had been killed for his involvement in the February 2017 attempted murder of Salvatore Scoppa, and also for his association with Ali Awada, whom was also gunned down by the Rizzuto family in January 2017.
Antonio De Blasio	August 17, 2017	45-year old De Blasio was shot and killed.
Jacques Desjardins	October 30, 2017	68-year old Desjardins was the brother to Raynald Desjardins. Desjardins was kidnapped and believed to have been murdered by the Rizzuto family.
Daniele Ranieri	February 3, 2018	33-year old Ranieri was killed in Cancún, Mexico. Ranieri was possibly killed as he was a former associate of Juan Fernandez, whom was killed in July 2013.
Steve Ovadia	June 28, 2018	Ovadia was shot and killed on Samson Boulevard in Chomedey, as he was an associate of Andrea Scoppa, whom led a resurrection against the Rizzuto family.
Anthony Magi	January 24, 2019	59-year old Magi was shot and killed on 6125 Saint-Jacques Street near Beaconsfield Avenue in Montreal. It is believed Magi was murdered for ordering the death of Nick Rizzuto Jr. in December 2009.
Cece Luppino	January 30, 2019	43-year old Luppino is the son of Rocco Luppino of the Luppino crime family in Hamilton, and was the cousin of Paolo Violi. Luppino was shot and killed at his home located at 52 Mountain Brow Blvd.
Mike Di Battista	March 25, 2019	43-year old Battista was shot and killed at Lomas del Sol, in La Mulata, in the Dominican Republic. Battista was a Rizzuto family enforcer and a known associate of Liborio Poncho Cuntrera, a high-ranking member of the Rizzuto family.
Mario Simeone	March 29, 2019	61-year old Simeone was shot and killed outside of his home on de Roquancourt St. in Côte-des-Neiges. Simeone was possibly murdered for his association with Tony Magi, whom was also gunned down by the Rizzuto family in January 2019 for his participation in the Nick Rizzuto Jr. murder in December 2009.
Salvatore Scoppa	May 4, 2019	49-year old Scoppa was shot and killed at the Sheraton Hotel in Laval, as Scoppa had attempted to take control of the Rizzuto family in 2015.
Andrea Scoppa	October 21, 2019	55-year old Scoppa was shot and killed at a parking lot located at 4744 Saint-Jean Boulevard in Pierrefonds-Roxboro.
Frantz Louis	November 19, 2020	Louis was an associate of the Rizzuto family with ties to high-ranking Rizzuto family member, Davide Barberio. 49-year old Louis was shot and killed whilst inside of his vehicle located at Fabre Street in the Villeray borough of Montreal.
Vincenzo Armeni	October 25, 2022	Armeni was believed to be a high-ranking member of the Rizzuto family. 66-year old Armeni was shot and killed near Highway 440 in Laval, Quebec.
Francesco "Chit" Del Balso	June 5, 2023	53-year old Del Balso was shot and killed in Dorval, Quebec. Del Balso, with a long duration of loyalty for the Rizzuto family, had turned against the family as a result of being "shelved" by the administration of the family. It is believed Del Balso, along with the Hells Angels, participated in the March 2023 attempted murder of Leonardo Rizzuto, thus the reason for his murder.
Giuseppe Lopez	September 5, 2023	59-year old former Rizzuto family associate Lopez was shot and killed in Juan Dolio in the Dominican Republic. Lopez was related to Serafino Oliverio, a possible soldier or capo for the Rizzuto family based in North Montreal, the Rizzuto family had allegedly been involved in laundering money through Oliverio's real estate, restaurants and bars. It is believed Lopez was murdered due to an alleged falling out with the Rizzuto-Sollecito family.
Gregory Woolley	November 17, 2023	51-year old Woolley was an Hells Angels member, and possibly killed by the Rizzuto family as retribution for the March 2023 attempted murder of Leonardo Rizzuto. Woolley was shot 6 times and killed at a parking lot in Saint-Jean-sur-Richelieu, Que.

== In popular culture ==
Writers Antonio Nicaso and Peter Edwards published Business or Blood, a history of the family, in 2015. The book was adapted into the television drama series Bad Blood, which debuted on Citytv in 2017.

== See also ==
- Italian Canadians in Greater Montreal
- List of Italian Mafia crime families
