= Salvatore Montagna =

Italian-Canadian crime boss (1971-2011)

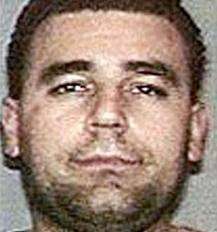
- Salvatore Montagna mugshot
- Born: 1971; Montreal, Quebec, Canada
- Died: November 24, 2011 (aged 39–40); Charlemagne, Quebec, Canada
- Cause of death: Gunshots
- Other names: "Sal the Iron Worker" "Bambino Boss"
- Citizenship: Canadian; Italian
- Occupations: Crime boss, mobster
- Spouse: Francesca Carcione
- Children: 3
- Allegiance: Bonanno crime family Rizzuto crime family

Salvatore "Sal the Iron Worker" Montagna (Italian: [salvaˈtoːre monˈtaɲɲa]; 1971 – November 24, 2011) was an Italian-Canadian crime boss and acting boss of the Bonanno crime family in New York City, as well as the Sicilian faction-leader of the Bronx section. He had later been associated with the Rizzuto crime family of Montreal.

Montagna was born in Montreal, Quebec, Canada in 1971. He was raised in Castellammare del Golfo, Sicily. In the mid 1980s, at the age of 15, his family immigrated to the United States and settled in the Bronx, New York. He later became an acting caporegime for the Bonanno crime family, and by 2004, he was the acting boss of the family in the absence of Vincent Basciano. Montagna was a Canadian and Italian citizen, and was deported from the United States to Canada in 2009. In Montreal, Montagna rivaled with the Rizzuto crime family, and after the death of boss Nicolo Rizzuto in 2010, he vied for power. In 2011, he had a falling-out with Rizzuto mobster Raynald Desjardins, and on November 24, 2011, his body was found on the shore of Île Vaudry on the L'Assomption River, in the city of Charlemagne, Quebec. In December 2016, Desjardins received a 14-year prison sentence for the murder plot.

== Early life ==
Montagna was born in Montreal, Quebec in 1971. He was raised in Castellammare del Golfo, Sicily. In the mid 1980s, at the age of 15, his family immigrated to the United States and settled in the Bronx, New York. It is unknown when Montagna became a criminal or when he became a made man in the Bonanno crime family. During the late 1990s, Montagna's name was overheard in wiretapped conversations between Boss Joseph "Big Joe" Massino and other reputed members of the Bonanno crime family.

He was a dual citizen of Italy and Canada.

== Sal the Iron Worker ==
Little is known of Montagna's personal life other than that he married Francesca Carcione and lived in a modest home in Elmont, Long Island with her and their three daughters. He started a small metalworking company called Matrix Steel Co., located at 50 Bogart Street in Bushwick, Brooklyn, managed by his wife. Matrix Steel manufactures structural and rail mill products, gray and ductile iron foundry crucibles, foundry converters, casting machines, sizing or embossing presses, foundry mold machines and foundry dies and tooling. It was around this time that Montagna was given the nickname "Sal the Iron Worker".

== Acting capo ==
In 2002, Montagna was arrested along with the crew of Patrick DeFilippo for illegal gambling and loansharking charges. He refused to answer questions before a grand jury and was charged with criminal contempt of court. He later pleaded guilty to the charge in 2003, and was placed on a five-year probation. In late 2003, US law enforcement and the Federal Bureau of Investigation (FBI) listed Montagna as an "Acting Capo" and Caporegime of the Bonanno family on behalf of DeFilippo and the Sicilian faction based in the Bronx.

== Acting boss ==
After longtime Bonanno boss "Big Joe" Massino became an informant in 2004, Vincent "Vinny Gorgeous" Basciano was recognized as the reputed Boss of the Bonanno crime family, only to discover that Massino would testify against Basciano as well. In 2006, as Basciano was facing jail time, he stated that he would promote the Sicilian faction of the old Bonanno crew back into the family's leadership, as Montagna was recognized as the reputed acting boss of the Bonanno crime family from 2006 until 2010, with Nicholas "Nicky Mouth" Santora as underboss and Anthony Rabito as consigliere, making the administration of the Bonanno crime family once again complete. At that time, Montagna gained the nickname "Bambino Boss" due to his relatively young age, being 35. In 2008, Montagna was still the reputed acting boss of the Bonannos, controlling the entire Bronx faction of the family, as the Daily News linked Montagna to known Sicilian Bonanno official Baldassare "Baldo" Amato.

On April 6, 2009, Montagna was arrested by the U.S. Immigration and Customs Enforcement as he left Matrix Steel. The 2003 criminal contempt conviction allowed U.S. authorities to strip him of his greencard and deport him to Canada; he was succeeded by Vincent Badalamenti as Bonanno family boss. According to mob writer Jerry Capeci, it was understood Montagna would have no standing or authority within Montreal's then-dominant Rizzuto crime family.

== Montreal area activities ==
After a slide in power of the Rizzuto family, Montagna started to show his influence. Months prior to the assassination of Nicolo Rizzuto, he had tried to convince the old patriarch to step down, and let younger blood rule.

In 2011, following the assassinations of several major Rizzuto mobsters starting in 2009, Montagna was identified as one of three major mobsters trying to fill the resulting power vacuum, if not take over the Montreal Mafia himself. He, along with Joe Di Maulo and his brother-in-law Raynald Desjardins attempted to take control of Montreal's mafia from the Rizzuto family.

Montagna and Desjardins had a falling-out in 2011, later said to be over control of loansharking and bookmaking in Montreal.

== Death ==
Police responded to gunshots in a suburban district of Ile aux Tresors on November 24, 2011, and found the body of Salvatore Montagna on the shore of Île Vaudry on the L'Assomption River, in the city of Charlemagne, Quebec, Canada, on Montreal's North Shore region. Witnesses reported that Montagna jumped in the river in an attempt to escape his killers. Law enforcement believed that Montagna was brought to the house of convicted smuggler Jack Arthur Simpson, as his vehicle was later found parked on a Montreal street.

By June 2016, authorities were more specific as to how Montagna had died: "Montagna was shot three times inside Simpson's home ... and ran outside in a futile attempt to escape. After crossing a narrow section of the Assomption River, Montagna collapsed and was later declared dead in a hospital".

The police investigation confirmed that Raynald Desjardins had taken part in the plot to murder Montagna, who, at the time, was suspected of trying to shake down Montreal-area construction companies, due to their alliance with the Rizzuto family. A number people were eventually arrested and charged, including Simpson and Desjardins. In 2016, Simpson, Vittorio Mirarchi, Calogero Milioto, Pietro Magistrale, Steven D'Addario, Steven Fracas and Felice Racaniello, all admitted to participating in the plot to kill Montagna and accepted plea deals except for Racaniello. In December 2016, Desjardins received a 14-year prison sentence, including time served.

"The killing [of Montagna] is thought to be tied to a turf war for control of the Montreal Mafia", the CBC reported in 2015.

== In popular culture ==
Montagna was portrayed by Joris Jarsky in the television drama series Bad Blood, which debuted in 2017, surrounding the Rizzuto crime family.

American Mafia
Preceded by Vincent Basciano	Bonanno crime family Acting boss 2006–2010	Succeeded by Vincent Badalamenti
