= Raynald Desjardins =

Canadian gangster (born 1953)

- Born: October 2, 1953 (age 73); Montreal, Quebec, Canada
- Occupation: Mobster
- Relatives: Jacques Desjardins (brother); Hugo Desjardins (nephew)
- Allegiance: Rizzuto crime family
- Convictions: Drug trafficking (1994); Conspiracy to commit murder (2016)
- Penalty: 15 years imprisonment 14 years imprisonment
- Accomplice: Hells Angels

Raynald Desjardins (born October 2, 1953) is a prominent organized crime figure in Montreal, and a former associate of the Rizzuto crime family. In 2010, he was part of a violent effort to take control of the Rizzutos' operations. He is currently serving a 14-year prison sentence for his role in the 2011 murder of the acting boss of New York's Bonanno crime family, Salvatore Montagna. The French-Canadian Desjardins has been described as "the most influential non-Italian in the Montreal Mafia since William Obront and Armand Courville". He is not related to André Desjardins, a corrupt union boss turned loan shark.

== Early career ==
By the mid-1980s, law enforcement saw Desjardins as a major figure in Montreal drug trafficking. He was considered the "right-hand man" to Rizzuto family leader, Vito Rizzuto, and was once described by authorities as "the supplier of drugs" for the Montreal Mafia. (Note: Emphasis added.)

Desjardins began his career in his teenage years working as a waiter in a Mafia-owned nightclub in Montreal. To supplement his income, he started selling hashish and heroin for his employers, and was first convicted of drug trafficking in 1971. During the following decade, Desjardins was close to Cotroni crime family member, Joseph Di Maulo, so much so, that the men became brothers-in-law. Desjardins was one of a small number of French-Canadians who became a senior member of the Montreal Mafia. Di Maulo's marriage to Desjardins's sister had given him a unique status within the organization despite being a non-Sicilian.

In 1973, Desjardins accompanied Di Maulo and Paolo Violi to New York City for the election of Philip Rastelli as the acting boss of the Bonanno family. When asked to go, Frank Cotroni, apparently suspecting a trap, refused and instead sent Di Maulo and Violi as his representatives. Desjardins served as the men's chauffeur. Di Maulo and Desjardins later became a part of the Sicilian Rizzuto organization after the Rizzutos replaced the Calabrian Cotronis as the dominant organized crime group in Montreal. The boss of the Rizzutos had a policy of co-opting Cotroni family members in order to avoid disrupting existing operations and networks, most notably those with the Bonannos.

Among these was the "Lebanese connection", a drug smuggling pipeline from Lebanon to Montreal, which the Rizzuto family took over during the late 1970s and early 1980s. In the spring of 1984, Desjardins and Rizzuto went to Milan to meet with Lebanese suppliers. It was agreed that from then on, they would deal only with the Rizzuto family. Later that year, Italian police intercepted 3.5 tons of hashish on a ship from Beirut bound for Montreal. Onboard, they found a pager registered in Desjardins's name.

The Rizzuto family had prior ties to Lebanon. In the 1970s, they began trading arms for hashish with the Phalange, a right-wing Lebanese militia fanatically committed to upholding Maronite Christian supremacy in Lebanon. The Rizzuto family was one of the group's main suppliers during the Lebanese civil war. The hashish was brought by ship from Beirut to the Atlantic coast of Canada, where it was transferred to smaller boats and offloaded in Newfoundland and Nova Scotia. From there, it was brought to Montreal by truck. Desjardins' smuggling route was intended to avoid dealing with the Irish-Canadian West End Gang who ran the Port of Montreal. In 1980, the FBI discovered that the Rizzuto family had been smuggling U.S.-bought M-16 assault rifles and ammunition to Montreal for export to Lebanon. The investigation started after the Rizzuto family hired a band of local criminals to break into a National Guard armory in Boston. The burglary itself was unusual, but the smuggling of guns bound for Lebanon from the United States into Canada, was not.

In 1987, on the advice of a Newfoundland criminal named Michael Hiscock, Desjardins decided that the ghost town of Ireland's Eye, located on a remote island off the coast of Newfoundland would be used for the operation's hand-offs. Ireland's Eye was chosen for its natural harbor, the ruins of a town abandoned in the 1960s, and its unused docks. The new operation began attracting attention on the Newfoundland mainland when local fishermen noticed mysterious convoys of trucks passing through their remote area at night. By this time, it was police estimated that 90% of the hashish in Canada came from Lebanon.

In December of that year, Desjardins, Rizzuto, and four others were arrested and charged by the Royal Canadian Mounted Police (RCMP) for attempting to smuggle hashish into the country by boat. The RCMP alleged that Desjardins oversaw the family's relations with the Phalange and was in charge of the entire Lebanese hashish smuggling operation. The case against them was eventually dismissed in 1990 by the Supreme Court of Newfoundland after it was discovered that officers of the RCMP had tried to record conversations between the accused and their lawyers during the trial. In 1991-1992, Desjardins was the target of another RCMP investigation, Project Bedtime, alleging that he had imported 50 tons of hashish from Libya, which was intercepted at the Port of Montreal following a tip, but no charges were ever brought against him.

In the early 1990s, Desjardins was reportedly given the task of handling relations with the Hells Angels whose Montreal Nomads chapter was headed by Maurice Boucher. At the time, Desjardins held a job as a sale representative for Amusements Deluxe, a Montreal company that supplied billiard tables, pinball machines and video games to bars and convenience stores all over Canada. Amusements Deluxe was mostly a cash business, and it has been alleged that the company was a front for the Rizzuto family, used to launder its profits, and that Desjardins was more than just a sales representative, but actually ran the company.

== First incarceration ==
Desjardins had ties to outlaw biker gangs, and in 1993, he was arrested as part of an RCMP investigation called "Operation Jaggy" for his role in the attempted import of 700 kilos of cocaine from Venezuela together with the Hells Angels. On 9 July 1993, Desjardins called Rizzuto on his cell phone, saying he needed to see him right away; the RCMP who were listening in noted that Desjardins was the only associate of Rizzuto who did not use the formal and respectful tone when addressing him, indicating that he had power within the Rizzuto family. On 25 August 1993, Desjardins was arrested as part of Operation Jaggy, and refused the Crown's offer of a plea bargain in exchange for testifying against Rizzuto. Desjardins stated: "Vito's my buddy; I'm going to do my time. And when I get out, I'll go shake his hand". At the time of his arrest, Desjardins exposed a corrupt RCMP officer, Jean Lord, whom he revealed had been trying to sell him information, which he hoped would lead to a reduced sentence. He later pleaded guilty on October 24, 1994, to being part of a conspiracy to bring up to 5,000 kilos of cocaine into Canada, and was sentenced to 15 years in prison.

While serving time for his conviction, Desjardins, nicknamed "the Millionaire", exerted control over his institution and its other prisoners. The renovation of a prison jogging track, by a contractor with whom he was associated, and paid for with his own money, prompted a federal investigation. A report by Corrections Canada described Desjardins as a leader of a Leclerc prison gang, consisting mostly of imprisoned Hells Angels and Mafiosi, that engaged in violent incidents in a bid to dominate the prison. He was "treated like he was a king', having his own personal computer and desk in his cell. Despite being implicated in multiple crimes against other inmates, he was never charged.

== Later career ==
Upon his release on June 2, 2004, Desjardins announced he was done with crime and intended to become a "construction entrepreneur". Despite this claim, he later surfaced in the Charbonneau Commission's investigation into graft in public contracts. Desjardins was described as a millionaire, who owned three construction companies in Montreal: Desjardins and Company, Desjardins and Cie, and Investissements Lasiter and Kane. His companies were mostly active in buying and developing land in the east-end of Montreal, which had been sold by the city "...for a fraction of their market value". Desjardins called himself a "good friend" of Jocelyn Dupuis, a senior FTQ union official, saying the FTQ union helped to make construction at his sites "go smoothly".

In 2004, Vito Rizzuto was indicted by a Brooklyn grand jury for his involvement in a 1981 triple murder and was eventually extradited to the US to stand trial. He later entered into a plea bargain and was incarcerated until 2012. In his absence, the struggle for control between the Rizzutos, Desjardins, Montagna, and others, led to a bloody string of killings. In 2018 Italian court records described Desjardins as the leader of this "turf war" against the Rizzutos. On September 16, 2011, Desjardins was the target of a failed assassination attempt when a gunman opened fire on him as he was driving near his Laval home. Desjardins and Montagna, once allies, had a falling out, purportedly over control of loansharking and bookmaking. Wiretap evidence also indicated that Desjardins suspected Montagna of the failed attempt on his life. Less than two months after the 2011 attempted hit, Desjardins took part in the plot that led to Montagna's murder. Montagna was found dead on November 24, 2011. At the time, he was suspected of trying to shake down construction companies in the Montreal area.

In 2015, Desjardins was the target of another assassination plot, by Maurice Boucher, head of the Nomads chapter of the Montreal Hells Angels. The plot failed and Boucher pleaded guilty to conspiracy to commit murder.

== Conspiracy to commit murder conviction ==
A number of individuals were charged with the murder of Montagna, including Desjardins and convicted smuggler Jack Arthur Simpson. Law enforcement believe that Montagna was brought to Simpson's home before he was murdered. Eventually, Desjardins, Simpson, Vittorio Mirarchi, Calogero Milioto, Pietro Magistrale, Steven D'Addario, Steven Fracas and Felice Racaniello, all admitted to participating in the plot to kill Montagna and accepted plea deals. Desjardins pleaded guilty in 2015 to a reduced charge of conspiracy to commit murder, and the following year, he was sentenced to 14 years in prison. At the time of the sentencing, Desjardins had served "at least the equivalent of a seven-and-a-half-year prison term", since his arrest.

== Books ==
- Cedilot, André; Noel, André (2012). Mafia Inc: The Long, Bloody Reign of Canada's Sicilian Clan. Toronto: Vintage Canada. ISBN 978-0307360410.
- Humphreys, Adrian; Lamothe, Lee (2014). The Sixth Family The Collapse of the New York Mafia and the Rise of Vito Rizzuto. Toronto: HarperCollins. ISBN 978-1443428026.
- Schneider, Stephen (2009). Iced: The Story of Organized Crime in Canada. Toronto: John Wiley & Sons. ISBN 978-0470835005.
