= Salvatore Vitale =

American underboss (born 1947)

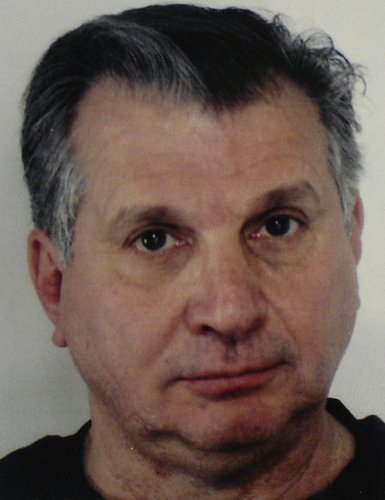
- Vitale's FBI mugshot
- Born: September 22, 1947 (age 79); New York City, U.S.
- Other name: "Good Looking Sal"
- Education: Grover Cleveland High School
- Occupation: Mobster
- Spouse: Diana
- Children: 4
- Relatives: Joseph Massino (brother-in-law)
- Allegiance: Bonanno crime family

Salvatore "Good Looking Sal" Vitale (born September 22, 1947) is an American former underboss of the Bonanno crime family before he became a government informant. After his arrest in 2003, Vitale agreed to cooperate with the government and testify against his brother-in-law, boss Joseph Massino, and in July 2004, Massino was convicted in a RICO case. Vitale had admitted to 11 murders, however, in October 2010, he was sentenced to time served due to his cooperation, and entered the witness protection program.

== Early life ==
Vitale was born on September 22, 1947, in Maspeth, Queens in New York City. He was the son of Giuseppe and Lilli Vitale, who had emigrated from the village of San Giuseppe Jato in Sicily after World War II; the couple had already had three daughters, but Salvatore was their only son to survive childbirth. Salvatore was described by his family as emotionally distant as a child.

Vitale first met Joseph Massino, future boss of the Bonanno family, as a child. Massino had begun dating Vitale's sister Josephine in 1956, and the couple married in 1960. Massino also befriended Salvatore Vitale, becoming a surrogate "big brother" to his future brother-in-law.

Unlike Massino Vitale graduated from Grover Cleveland High School in Ridgewood, Queens. He also attempted to have a legitimate career; Vitale entered the U.S. Military and had been trained as a paratrooper. Discharged in 1968, he went on to work briefly as a New York State Department of Corrections and Community Supervision corrections officer, working in Queens with drug offenders.

He and his wife Diana moved to Long Island, a safe distance from mob-entrenched Maspeth to have a better life for themselves. Salvatore managed his own social club in Maspeth not far from Joseph Massino's CasaBlanca Restaurant and Catering Service at 62-15 60th Lane where he would meet with his underlings.

== Criminal career ==
When he quit that job, Vitale approached Joseph Massino for criminal work. He soon became involved in burglaries and transport truck hijacking. He was given a no-show job as a food consultant for King Caterer's in Farmingdale, New York.

Massino began jockeying for power with Dominick "Sonny Black" Napolitano, another loyalist capo to the boss Philip Rastelli. Both men were themselves threatened by another faction seeking to depose the absentee boss led by capos Alphonse "Sonny Red" Indelicato, Dominick "Big Trin" Trinchera and Philip Giaccone. The Commission initially tried to maintain neutrality, but in 1981, Massino got word from Carmine "Tutti" Franzese (Sonny Franzese's cousin) that the three capos were stocking up on automatic weapons and planning to kill the Rastelli loyalists within the Bonanno family to take complete control. Massino turned to Colombo crime family boss Carmine Persico and Gambino boss Paul Castellano for advice; they told him to act immediately.

Massino, Napolitano and Gerlando Sciascia, a Sicilian-born capo linked to the Montreal Rizzuto crime family, arranged a meeting at a Brooklyn social club with the three capos for May 5, 1981. They had four gunmen, including Vitale and Bonanno-affiliated Montreal boss Vito Rizzuto, hiding in a closet to ambush them. When Trinchera, Giaccone and Indelicato arrived with Frank Lino to meet Massino, they were shot to death, with Massino himself stopping Indelicato from escaping. Lino escaped unscathed by running out the door. The hit further improved Massino's prestige, but was marred by both Lino's escape and the discovery of Indelicato's body on May 28.

On April 21, 1983, Rastelli was paroled, and he and Massino ordered the murder of Bonanno soldier Cesare Bonventre. Massino summoned Vitale, Louis Attanasio and James Tartaglione to his hideout and gave them the order. By this time, even though Rastelli was still officially head of the family, Massino was considered by most mobsters to be the family's street boss and field commander in all but name, as well as Rastelli's heir apparent. According to Vitale, Massino had Bonventre killed for giving him no support when he was in hiding.

In April 1984, Bonventre was called to a meeting with Rastelli in Queens. He was picked up by Vitale and Attanasio and driven to a garage. En route, Attanasio shot Bonventre twice in the head but only wounded him; he would kill Bonventre with two more shots when they reached their destination. The task of disposing of Bonventre's corpse was handed to Gabriel Infanti, who promised Vitale that Bonventre's remains would disappear forever. However, after a tipoff, the remains were discovered on April 16, 1984, in a warehouse in Garfield, New Jersey, stuffed into two 55-gallon glue drums. For his part in the hit, Massino had Vitale initiated into the Bonanno family.

Later in 1984, Massino and Salvatore Vitale secured no-show jobs with the Long Island-based King Caterers in exchange for protecting them from Lucchese extortion. In 1985, an indictment charged Vitale as a co-conspirator in the hijacking cases alongside Massino.

On October 15, 1986, Massino was found guilty of racketeering charges for accepting kickbacks on the Bonannos' behalf. On January 16, 1987, Massino was sentenced to 10 years' imprisonment, his first prison term. Rastelli, also convicted and in poor health during the trial, was sentenced to 12 years in prison. Around this time, Massino was believed to be the Bonanno family's official underboss. With Rastelli in declining health, Massino was also reckoned as the operating head of the family, though consigliere Anthony "Old Man" Spero was nominally acting boss.

In April 1987, Massino and Vitale went on trial for truck hijacking and conspiracy to commit the triple murder, defended by Samuel H. Dawson and Bruce Cutler respectively. On June 3, while both men were convicted on hijacking charges, they were cleared of the murder conspiracy charges. Further, the only proven criminal acts took place outside the RICO act's five-year statute of limitations; without evidence that the "criminal enterprise" was still active in this timeframe the jury returned a special verdict clearing Massino and Vitale of these charges as well.

During Massino's imprisonment, Vitale functioned as his messenger, effectively becoming co-acting boss alongside Spero. On Massino's orders, Vitale organized the murder of Gabriel Infanti, who had also botched a 1982 hit on Anthony Gilberti and was suspected of being an informant. During his meetings with Massino in prison, Vitale, on behalf of the Bonannos' capos, urged his brother-in-law to become boss in name as well as in fact. Rastelli had spent all but two years of his reign behind bars, and many felt Massino would bring the family stability. Massino was reluctant to take over as long as Rastelli was alive. Not only was he respectful of Rastelli's sponsorship of his Mafia career, but Mafia tradition dictates that a boss keeps his title for life unless he abdicates. However, in the spring of 1991, Massino ordered Vitale, "If Rastelli dies, make me boss."

Rastelli died on June 24, 1991. A few days after his funeral, in accordance with Massino's orders, Vitale called a meeting of the family's capos, and Massino was acclaimed as boss.

Massino was granted two years' supervised release on November 13, 1992. During that time, he could not associate with convicted mafiosi. To get around this restriction, Massino named Vitale underboss and designated him as his messenger for the duration of his supervised release. While the FBI suspected Vitale was a mafioso, he had never been convicted of a Mafia-related crime. The FBI would thus have no reason to be suspicious of him associating with Massino since they were brothers-in-law. He returned to his job at King Caterers, and in 1996 became co-owner of Casablanca, a well-reviewed Maspeth Italian restaurant.

To minimize the damage from informants or undercover investigations Massino decentralized the family's organization. He created a clandestine cell system for his crews, forbidding them from contacting one another and avoiding meeting their capos. A side effect of these reforms was the reduction of Vitale, in his own words, to "a figurehead." By the time of Massino's release the Bonanno family had grown tired of Vitale, regarding him as greedy and overstepping his authority. In the new structure of the family, Vitale lost the underboss's usual role as a go-between for the boss, as well as the share of the family's profits those duties entailed, and Massino made it clear to Vitale his unpopularity was a factor in these changes. Vitale remained loyal, however, and helped Massino organize the March 18, 1999, murder of Gerlando Sciascia. Massino indicated to fellow mobsters that Sciascia was killed for feuding with fellow Massino-confidant capo Anthony Graziano, accusing him of using cocaine, while in his own testimony Massino claimed Sciascia was killed for killing another mobster's son. Sciascia's body was not covertly buried but instead left to be discovered in a street in the Bronx, an attempt to make the hit look like a botched drug deal rather than a Mafia-ordered hit, and Massino had his capos attend Sciascia's funeral.

Vitale was put under house arrest in 2001 after pleading guilty to his role in an extortion scheme on Long Island. Vitale later also pleaded guilty to loansharking charges in June 2002. Vitale was not immediately sentenced, and was placed under house arrest in the interim. However, the maximum sentence Vitale faced was so low that Massino wrongly suspected his underboss was cooperating with law enforcement. He secretly ordered that, if he was arrested, Vitale was to be "taken down"—demoted or killed.

== Informant ==
Until 2002, the Bonannos had been the only family in the modern history of the New York Mafia (i.e., since the Castellammarese War) to have never had a made man turn informant or government witness. Massino used this as a point of pride to rally his crime family. That year, Frank Coppa, convicted on fraud and facing further charges from an FBI forensic accounting investigation, became the first to flip. Coppa gave information that directly implicated both Vitale and acting underboss Richard Cantarella in the Perrino murder. Cantarella himself flipped soon afterward.

On January 9, 2003, Massino was arrested and indicted, alongside Vitale, Frank Lino and capo Daniel Mongelli, in a comprehensive racketeering indictment. On the day of Vitale's arrest, FBI agents dropped a bombshell–they had evidence that Massino believed Vitale had turned informer, and had gone as far as to put a contract on him.

It turned out that Coppa and Cantarella had told the FBI of Massino's earlier plans to kill his brother-in-law. While in custody, Massino again put out the word that he was "very upset" with Vitale and wanted to "give him a receipt" – his term for a whacking. Other Bonanno defendants awaiting trial began calling Vitale "Fredo" (after Fredo Corleone, Michael Corleone's turncoat brother in The Godfather Part II). The FBI took the threat very seriously, going as far as to house Massino and Vitale in separate prisons (Massino in Brooklyn, Vitale in Manhattan) and keep them apart when they were not appearing in court.

Vitale was already dissatisfied by the lack of support he and his family received from Massino after his arrest. Despite this, he had every intention of staying loyal until learning that Massino wanted him killed. On the day he was arraigned with Massino, Vitale decided to flip as soon as it was safe to do so; he formally reached a deal with prosecutors in February.

Shortly after Vitale reached his deal, Lino flipped as well. Lino knew that Vitale could implicate him in at least four murders – including that of Sonny Black. Also flipping was longtime Bonanno associate Duane Leisenheimer, whom Vitale implicated in several crimes, including two murders. When an investigator for Massino's defense team started probing to see if Leisenheimer would flip, Leisenheimer feared that Massino would put a contract on him and cut a deal with prosecutors for his own safety.

While the prosecution relied heavily on the testimony of five other turncoats, Vitale was of particular significance to the prosecution's case. Not only was he the third confessed underboss of a New York crime family to turn informer (after the Gambinos' Sammy Gravano and the Luccheses' Anthony Casso), but he had spent most of his three decades in the Mafia as a close confidant to Massino. This closeness allowed prosecutors to introduce evidence of over three decades of criminal activity by Massino, and enabled Vitale to cover his brother-in-law's entire criminal history in his testimony. The only witness called by Massino's defense was an FBI agent to challenge Vitale's reliability.

On the strength of testimony from Vitale and other turncoats, Massino was convicted on all 11 RICO counts on July 30, 2004. Facing the prospect of the death penalty for ordering Sciascia's murder, Massino almost immediately began talks for a plea deal of his own. He formally pleaded guilty to that charge on June 23, 2005, and was sentenced to two consecutive life sentences.

Vitale had admitted to 11 murders, but for his cooperation, was sentenced to time served on October 29, 2010, and entered the witness protection program. Vitale's testimony led to the convictions of 51 organized crime figures. Vitale returned to the stand again in March 2012 to testify against Thomas Gioeli.

American Mafia
Preceded by Joseph "Big Joey" Massino	Bonanno crime family Underboss; 1991–2004	Succeeded by Nicholas "Nicky Mouth" Santora
