= Louis Attanasio =

American mobster (born 1944)

- Born: June 22, 1944 (age 82); White Plains, New York, U.S.
- Other name: "Louie HaHa"
- Occupation: Mobster
- Allegiance: Bonanno crime family
- Convictions: Tax evasion and bribery (1985); Racketeering, murder, conspiracy to commit murder, loan sharking (2006)
- Penalty: Five years' imprisonment (1985); 15 years' imprisonment (2006)

Louis "Louie HaHa" Attanasio Jr. (born June 22, 1944) is an American mobster and reputed captain in the Bonanno crime family. He is the brother of Bonanno mobster Robert Attanasio. Attanasio earned the nickname "HaHa" because he laughed whenever he killed a man.

Attanasio was married twice, marrying young and divorcing his first wife in 1992. In 2003, he divorced his second wife Erica, who allegedly suffered from a bipolar disorder. In the divorce settlement, Erica allegedly received $200,000 over a span of five years.

In April 1984, Attanasio participated in the murder of Bonanno soldier Cesare Bonventre. Bonanno leaders Philip Rastelli and Joseph Massino had ordered Bonventre's murder because they felt he was a threat to their power. On the day of the murder, Attanasio and Bonanno mobster Salvatore Vitale picked up Bonventre to bring him to a meeting with Rastelli. As Vitale drove into a garage, Attanasio shot Bonventre twice in the head. Surprisingly, Bonventre still struggled, forcing the two hitmen to stop the car. Bonventre crawled out of the car onto the concrete before Attanasio finished him off with two more shots. Bonventre's body was hacked to pieces and dumped into three 55-gallon glue drums in a Garfield, New Jersey warehouse. After the body was recovered, it took forensic technicians three months to identify it.

During the 1980s, Attanasio was convicted of tax evasion and of trying to bribe a state trooper. He received five years in prison.

In June 1996, Attanasio was indicted on racketeering and loansharking charges. He reportedly ran his loansharking operation in the 1980s while in federal prison on his tax evasion conviction. In 1997, after a 23-year romance, Attanasio married his second wife, Erica, in a prison wedding ceremony

In January 2004, Attanasio was indicted in New York on charges of murder, conspiracy to murder and loansharking. To avoid prosecution, he and Erica fled to Sint Maarten, where he maintained a residence. In December 2004, Attansio was arrested by members of the Sint Maarten Police Force after they received a tip that he was residing on the island. He was later extradited to the United States to face charges, including the 1984 Bonventre murder.

On September 20, 2006, Attanasio was sentenced to 15 years in prison as part of his plea agreement for the 1984 Bonventre murder. As of April 2014, he was serving his sentence at the Federal Correctional Institution (FCI) Elkton, a low security unit in Elkton, Ohio. His projected release date was January 23, 2018, but he was released on May 2, 2017.

American Mafia
| Preceded by Joseph "Big Joe" Massino as underboss | Bonanno crime family Acting underboss 1984–1988 | Succeeded by Salvatore "Handsome Sal" Vitale as underboss |
