= Gerlando Sciascia =

Member of the Sicilian Mafia

Gerlando (George) Sciascia
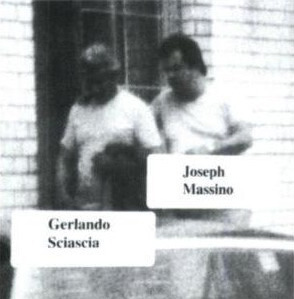
- FBI surveillance photograph of Gerlando Sciascia and Joseph Massino
- Born: February 15, 1934; Cattolica Eraclea, Sicily, Kingdom of Italy
- Died: March 18, 1999 (aged 65); New York City, U.S.
- Cause of death: Gunshot wounds to the head
- Other name: "George from Canada"
- Occupation: Mobster
- Allegiance: Bonanno crime family Rizzuto crime family

Gerlando "George from Canada" Sciascia (Italian pronunciation: [dʒerˈlando ʃˈʃaʃʃa]; February 15, 1934 – March 18, 1999), was a Sicilian mobster who served as a caporegime for the Bonanno crime family. Sciascia was the Sixth Family's representative in New York, and was a major narcotics trafficker in Canada and the United States.

== Early life ==
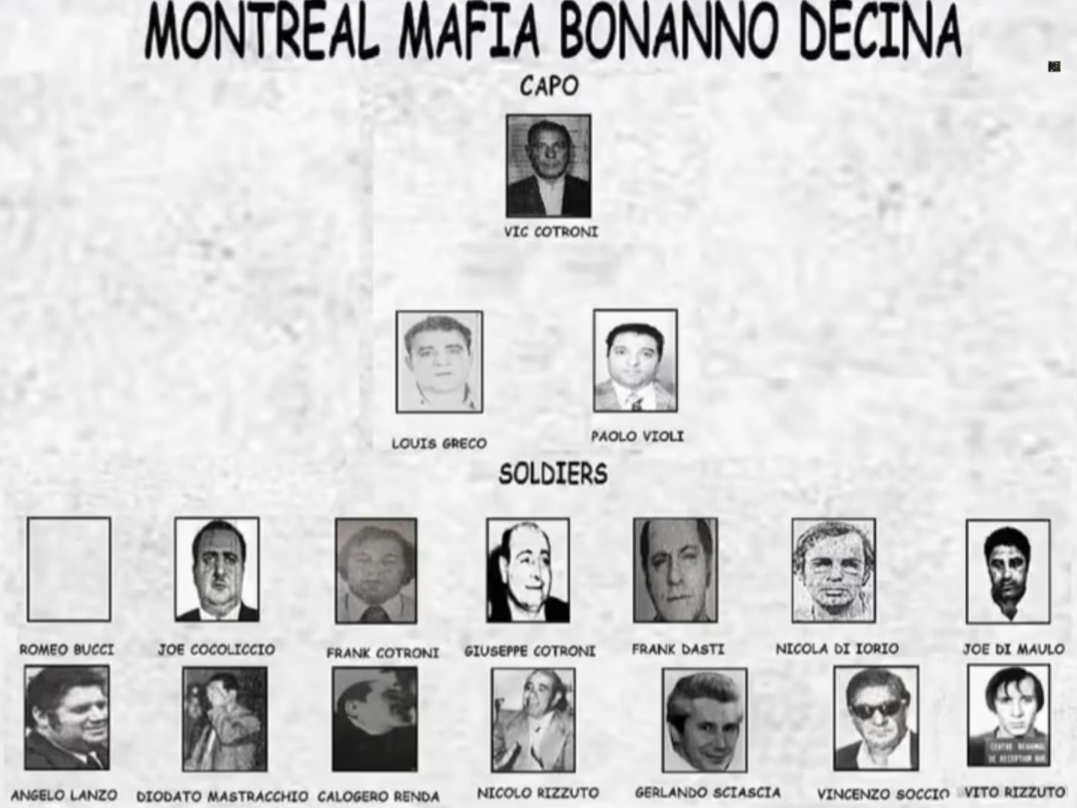
Royal Canadian Mounted Police chart of the Bonanno crime family's crew (decina) in Montreal

Sciascia was born in Cattolica Eraclea in the province of Agrigento, Sicily, the same area as Montreal Mafia boss Vito Rizzuto. In 1955, Sciascia immigrated to Montreal, Quebec, Canada, later moving to the United States, to New York City in 1958.

His business headquarters was a small jewelry store in the Bronx. By the mid-1970s, Sciascia was established in New York with the Sicilian, or "zip" faction, of the Bonanno family. However, due to his Sicilian upbringing, Sciascia also had close ties to the Bonanno crew in Montreal, which included Rizzuto. At this time, the Bonanno leadership considered the Rizzutos and the Bonanno crew in Canada to be under their firm direction and control.

== Three capos murder ==
On May 5, 1981, Sciascia participated in the murders of dissident Bonanno capos Dominick "Big Trin" Trinchera, Alphonse "Sonny Red" Indelicato, and Philip "Lucky" Giaccone at a Gambino crime family social club in Dyker Heights, Brooklyn. Rizzuto came from Montreal with two Sicilian hitmen to join Joseph Massino, Salvatore Vitale, and Sciascia. Sciascia escorted the three rebellious capos into the club. Once the men were inside, Sciascia signalled the attack by slowly running his fingers through his hair. At that point, the men burst from a closet and started shooting. During the slaughter, Salvatore Vitale observed Sciascia shooting Indelicato in the head. When the three capos were dead, Sciascia and his Sicilians quickly left the building, leaving the cleanup to Vitale and the others.

== Narcotics indictment ==
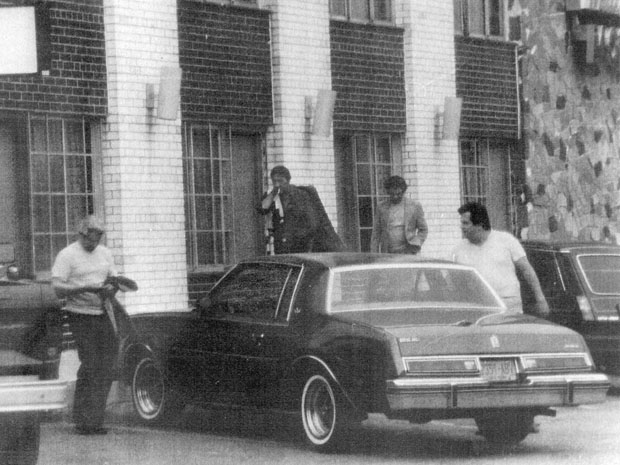
From left to right: Sciascia, Vito Rizzuto, Giovanni Ligamarri and Joseph Massino in 1981

In 1983, Sciascia was indicted for attempting to transport 46 kilograms of heroin from Canada to the United States. To avoid prosecution, he fled to Montreal. In the 1980s, while living in Montreal, Sciascia served as the liaison between the Rizzuto crime family and the Bonanno family in New York, managing drug trafficking between the two countries. On the New York side, he worked closely with Gambino mobsters Gene Gotti and John Carneglia. In 1986, Sciascia was arrested by the Royal Canadian Mounted Police based on the drug trafficking charges in the US.

In 1988, after two years in Canadian custody fighting the extradition order, Sciascia was deported back to the United States. Wealthy from his heroin trafficking days, Sciascia established a small construction company in the Bronx. On February 9, 1990, Sciascia was acquitted on the narcotics trafficking charges in New York. Government witness Sammy Gravano later claimed that the Bonanno family paid a juror $10,000 to block Sciascia's conviction.

In July 1991, Sciascia applied to the Canadian government for readmission to Canada, basing his application on his son Joseph's residence in Montreal. In 1997, after a long legal battle, Citizenship and Immigration Canada deemed Sciascia persona non grata and denied him readmission to Canada.

== Friction between criminal partners ==
In the 1990s, relations between Massino and Sciascia had started to sour. Scascia was becoming more independent of Massino and more aligned with Vito Rizzuto. Growing richer and stronger, Rizzuto became less willing to defer all decisions to the Bonannos.

On April 30, 1992, Sciascia's top lieutenant in Canada, Joseph LoPresti, was found shot to death in a Montreal lot. LoPresti, a Bonanno made man, was murdered without any prior notification or approval from the New York Bonanno leadership. Sciascia defended the killing to Salvatore Vitale as justified because LoPresti had become addicted to drugs.

On a later occasion, when Rizzuto refused to send a hit team to New York to kill Bonanno target Robert Perino, Sciascia infuriated Massino by again supporting Rizzuto. When Bonanno capo Anthony Graziano, a Massino loyalist, appeared high on drugs in a meeting, Sciascia started telling other Bonanno family members that Graziano was a substance abuser. When new family boss Joseph Massino heard about Sciascia's complaints, he felt Sciascia was attacking him also. Feeling that Sciascia was challenging his authority, Massino, in a jealous rage, decided to have him killed.

== Murder ==
In early 1999, at a wedding anniversary party, Massino gave the following message to Salvatore Vitale: "George has got to go". The plan was for fellow capo Patrick DeFilippo to invite Sciascia to a meeting to resolve an ongoing disagreement with Graziano over a marijuana racket. Massino wanted the Sciascia murder to look like a drug deal gone wrong to avoid friction with the Rizzutos.

On March 18, 1999, Sciascia received a note at his jewelry store telling him to meet DeFilippo at a location in Manhattan. There, DeFilippo told Sciascia that they were driving to a different location in Lakeville, New York and the two men were picked up by mobster John Spirito. As Spirito drove the vehicle, DeFilippo shot Sciascia to death with seven bullets. The gunmen then drove to Mott Avenue, where they dumped Sciascia's body. A passerby saw the dumping and immediately called the police.

== Aftermath ==
Vacationing in Mexico, Massino immediately met with each of the Bonanno capos to tell them he did not know what happened to Sciascia and theorized it was a bad drug deal. However, in private, Massino reportedly remarked, "It served him right for telling me how to run the family."

On July 30, 2004, Massino was convicted of seven murders, including the Sciascia murder. With prosecutors intent on asking for the death penalty, Massino quickly offered to become a government witness. On June 23, 2005, Massino confessed to ordering Sciascia's murder along with other murders and several other crimes. He was sentenced to life in prison.

On January 11, 2006, DeFilippo was indicted on several federal racketeering charges, including the Sciascia murder. However, on May 9, 2006, the jury exonerated him of the murder charge.
