= Philip Giaccone =

American mobster

- Born: July 12, 1932; New York City, U.S.
- Disappeared: May 5, 1981 (aged 48)
- Died: May 5, 1981 (aged 48); New York City, U.S.
- Cause of death: Gun shots
- Body discovered: October 19, 2004; New York City, U.S.
- Other names: "Philly Lucky" "The Priest"
- Occupation: Mobster
- Allegiance: Bonanno crime family

Philip Giaccone (July 12, 1932 – May 5, 1981), also known as "Philly Lucky", was an American mobster and caporegime in the Bonanno crime family who was murdered with Dominick Trinchera and Al Indelicato for planning to overthrow Bonanno boss Philip Rastelli.

== Biography ==
Giaccone was born in Ridgewood, Queens. His father died during the 1930s, leaving Giaccone, his sisters and brothers, and mother to fend for themselves during the Great Depression. Serving as an altar boy, Giaccone grew up as a strict Catholic. Giaccone had good grades in school and graduated from high school. As a young man, he became a protegee of Bonanno underboss Giovanni Bonventre.

Giaccone had a wife Annette, a daughter Corinne, and a son Phillip Giaccone Jr. He was an in-law to Gambino crime family boss Carlo Gambino. Giaccone's legitimate business was Pinto Trucking, a trucking firm in South Ozone Park, Queens that served also as a headquarters for his crew. During his life, Giaccone was never convicted of a crime.

By the mid-1970s, the Bonanno family was in turmoil. After official boss Philip Rastelli went to prison in 1975, capo Carmine Galante took control of the family. It is suspected that the heads of the other New York Five Families collaborated with Rastelli to arrange Galante's death; they supposedly viewed Galante's greed and ambition as a threat to all their interests. On July 12, 1979, gunmen, one of whom was allegedly Anthony Indelicato, murdered Galante at Joe & Mary's Italian-American restaurant in Bushwick, Brooklyn.

After the Galante murder, a fight for control of the family started. Joseph Massino began jockeying for power with Dominick "Sonny Black" Napolitano, another Rastelli loyalist capo. Both men were themselves threatened by another faction seeking to depose the absentee boss led by capos Alphonse "Sonny Red" Indelicato, Dominick "Big Trin" Trinchera and Giaccone. The Commission initially tried to maintain neutrality, but in 1981, Massino got word from his informants that the three capos were stocking up on automatic weapons and planning to kill the Rastelli loyalists within the Bonanno family to take complete control. Massino turned to Colombo crime family boss Carmine Persico and Gambino boss Paul Castellano for advice; they told him to act immediately.

== Three capos murder ==
On May 5, 1981, Massino loyalists shot and killed Giaccone, Trinchera, and Indelicato in a Brooklyn nightclub. On the pretext of working out a peace agreement, Massino had invited them to meet with him at the 20/20 Night Club in Clinton Hill, Brooklyn. However, Massino's real plan was to assassinate the capos. The ambush was set in the club store room, with Salvatore Vitale and three other gunmen wearing ski masks hiding in a closet. One of the gunmen was mobster Vito Rizzuto, who came from Montreal, Quebec, Canada with another Canadian mobster to help Massino. Massino told the men to avoid shooting so that bullets wouldn't spray around the room. Massino also brought drop cloths and ropes for disposing of the bodies afterwards.

When the capos arrived at the 20/20, Massino and Bonanno mobster Gerlando Sciascia and Frank Lino escorted them to the store room. As the men entered the room, Sciascia brushed his hand through his hair, giving the prearranged signal. Vitale and gunmen rushed out of the closet, with Rizzuto yelling "it's a hold up". Massino immediately punched Giaccone, knocking him to the floor, and also stopping Indelicato from escaping. Giaccone got up and tried to run out of the room, but was blocked up against a wall with Trinchera. The gunmen killed Giaccone with a volley of submachine gun fire. The three capos were unarmed, as was the rule when attending a peace meeting. Lino, who had escaped, was brought instead of Indelicato's son, but was quickly won over to Massino's side.

After the killings, the Bonanno gunmen transported the three bodies to a lot in Lindenwood, Queens, in an area known as The Hole.

The lot was a Gambino mob graveyard; Gambino crime family capo John Gotti arranged for his men to bury the bodies there as a favor to Massino. A few weeks later, on May 28, authorities discovered Indelicato's body and removed it from the lot.

In October 2004, after some children reported finding a body in the Lindenwood lot, FBI agents excavated the property and discovered the bodies of Giaccone and Trinchera. Among the personal items they unearthed was a Piaget watch that had belonged to Giaccone's wife. In December 2004, the bodies were positively identified as Giaccone and Trinchera.

On June 23, 2005, Massino, then a government witness to avoid the death penalty, pleaded guilty to several murders including those of Giaccone, Trinchera, and Indelicato. He received two life sentences in prison. On May 4, 2007, after being extradited to the United States, Rizzuto pleaded guilty in a Brooklyn court to reduced charges in the murder of three capos and was sentenced to ten years in state prison.

== In popular culture ==
- In the 1997 film Donnie Brasco, Philip Giaccone was portrayed by Tony Lip.
- In the 2017 Canadian TV series Bad Blood, in a flashback, Giaccone was portrayed by Massimo Cannistrano.

== See also ==
- List of solved missing person cases (1980s)
