= Al Indelicato =

American mobster (1931–1981)

- Born: Alphonse Indelicato; February 25, 1927; New York City, U.S.
- Disappeared: May 5, 1981 (aged 54)
- Died: May 5, 1981 (aged 54); New York City, U.S.
- Cause of death: Gunshots
- Body discovered: May 28, 1981; New York City, U.S.
- Other name: Sonny Red
- Occupation: Mobster
- Children: Anthony "Bruno" Indelicato
- Allegiance: Bonanno crime family

Alphonse Indelicato (February 25, 1927 – May 5, 1981), also known as Sonny Red, was an American mobster and caporegime in the Bonanno crime family who was murdered with Dominick Trinchera and Philip Giaccone for planning to overthrow Bonanno boss Philip Rastelli.

== Early life ==
Alphonse Indelicato was born in New York City. Indelicato's family came from Sciacca, Sicily, Italy, and became naturalized citizens once living in Utica, New York. Indelicato was the father-in-law of Bonanno associate Salvatore Valenti and ex-son-in-law of Bonanno capo, bookmaker Charles Ruvolo. Indelicato was particularly fond of a pair of custom-made red leather cowboy boots, which may have been the source of his nickname "Sonny Red".

Indelicato is a nephew to Salvatore Falcone, a heroin trafficker. Indelicato was married first to Charles Ruvolo's unidentified daughter, with whom he fathered a son, Anthony "Bruno" Indelicato. Indelicato later married Margaret Elizabeth McFhadden, but the two later became estranged.

Indelicato was indicted in 1972 for the inquiry into the murder of Joe Gallo, but was released on $15,000 bail.

=== Planning a coup ===
Joseph Massino began jockeying for power with Dominick "Sonny Black" Napolitano, another Philip Rastelli loyalist capo, after the 1979 murder of Carmine Galante. Both men were themselves threatened by another faction seeking to depose the absentee boss led by capos Indelicato, Dominick "Big Trin" Trincera and Philip Giaccone. The Commission initially tried to maintain neutrality, but in 1981, Massino got word from his informants that the three capos were stocking up on automatic weapons and planning to kill the Rastelli loyalists within the Bonanno family to take complete control. Massino turned to Colombo crime family boss Carmine Persico and Gambino crime family boss Paul Castellano for advice; they told him to act immediately.

== The three capos murder ==
On May 5, 1981, Massino loyalists shot and killed Indelicato, Trinchera, and Giaccone, in a Brooklyn night club. On the pretext of working out a peace agreement, Massino had invited them to meet with him at the 20/20 Night Club in Clinton Hill, Brooklyn. However, Massino's real plan was to assassinate the capos. The ambush was set in the club store room, with Salvatore Vitale and three other gunmen wearing ski masks hiding in a closet. One of the gunmen was mobster Vito Rizzuto, who came from Montreal with another Canadian mobster to help Massino. Massino told the men to avoid shooting wildly so that bullets wouldn't spray around the room. Massino also brought drop cloths and ropes for disposing of the bodies afterwards.

When the capos arrived at the 20/20, Massino and Bonanno mobster Gerlando Sciascia and Frank Lino escorted them to the store room. As the men entered the room, Sciascia brushed his hand through his hair, giving the prearranged signal. Vitale and gunmen rushed out of the closet, with Rizzuto yelling "it's a hold up". Massino immediately punched Giaccone, knocking him to the floor, and also stopping Indelicato from escaping. Giaccone got up and tried to run out of the room, but was blocked up against a wall with Trinchera. The gunmen killed Giaccone with a volley of submachine gun fire. They then turned their weapons on Indelicato and Trinchera. The three capos were unarmed, as was the rule when attending a peace meeting.

After the killings, the Bonanno gunmen transported the three bodies to a lot in Lindenwood, Queens, in an area known as The Hole.

The lot was a Gambino mob graveyard; Gambino capo John Gotti arranged for his men to bury the bodies there as a favor to Massino. A few weeks later, on May 28, authorities discovered Indelicato's body and removed it from the lot.

In October 2004, after some children reported finding a body in the Lindenwood lot, FBI agents excavated the property and discovered the bodies of Trinchera and Giaccone. Among the personal items they unearthed was a Piaget watch that had belonged to Giaccone's wife. In December 2004, the bodies were positively identified as Giaccone and Trinchera.

On June 23, 2005, Massino, then a government witness to avoid the death penalty, pleaded guilty to several murders including those of Giaccone, Trinchera, and Indelicato. He received two life sentences in prison. On May 4, 2007, after being extradited to the United States, Rizzuto pleaded guilty in a Brooklyn court to reduced charges in the murder of three capos and was sentenced to ten years in state prison.

After his father's murder, Indelicato's son, Anthony, went into hiding in Fort Lauderdale, Florida. Massino wanted to kill him also, but he had missed the meeting. His father brought Lino instead, who was the sole survivor of the massacre. Lino, who had escaped, was quickly won over to Massino's side. Napolitano assigned associate Donnie Brasco, who he hoped to make a made man, to kill Indelicato. "Brasco", however, was in fact an undercover FBI agent named Joseph Pistone; shortly after the hit was ordered, Pistone's assignment was ended and Napolitano was informed of their infiltration.

== In popular culture ==
- In the 1997 film Donnie Brasco, Al Indelicato was portrayed by Robert Miano.
- In the 2017 Canadian TV series Bad Blood, in a flashback, Sonny Red is portrayed by Joe Di Mambro.

== See also ==
- List of solved missing person cases: 1950–1999
