= Dominick Trinchera =

American gangster

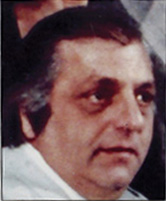
- Born: December 20, 1936; New York City, U.S.
- Disappeared: May 5, 1981 (aged 44)
- Died: May 5, 1981 (aged 44); New York City, U.S.
- Cause of death: Gun shots
- Body discovered: October 19, 2004; New York City, U.S.
- Other name: Big Trin
- Occupation: Mobster
- Allegiance: Bonanno crime family

Dominick "Big Trin" Trinchera (December 20, 1936 – May 5, 1981) was an American caporegime in the Bonanno crime family who was murdered with Alphonse Indelicato and Philip Giaccone for planning to overthrow Bonanno boss Philip Rastelli.

== Early life ==
Trinchera was born in the Bronx, New York, the son of an Italian immigrant from Rome and an Italian-American woman from Naples. He weighed 350 pounds, married a woman named Donna, and fathered several children.

Trinchera was indicted in 1972 for the inquiry into the murder of Joe Gallo, but was released on $5,000 bail. After the murder of Carmine Galante in 1979, a fight for control of the family started. Joseph Massino began jockeying for power with Dominick "Sonny Black" Napolitano, another Rastelli loyalist capo. Both men were themselves threatened by another faction seeking to depose the absentee boss led by capos Alphonse "Sonny Red" Indelicato, Trinchera and Philip Giaccone. The Commission initially tried to maintain neutrality, but in 1981, Massino got word from his informants that the three capos were stocking up on automatic weapons and planning to kill the Rastelli loyalists within the Bonanno family to take complete control. Massino turned to Colombo crime family boss Carmine Persico and Gambino boss Paul Castellano for advice; they told him to act immediately.

== The three capos murder ==
On May 5, 1981, Massino loyalists shot and killed Trinchera, Giaccone, and Indelicato in a Brooklyn nightclub. On the pretext of working out a peace agreement, Massino had invited them to meet with him at the 20/20 Night Club in Clinton Hill, Brooklyn. However, Massino's real plan was to assassinate the capos. The ambush was set in the club store room, with Salvatore Vitale and three other gunmen wearing ski masks hiding in a closet. One of the gunmen was mobster Vito Rizzuto, who came from Montreal, Quebec, Canada with another Canadian mobster to help Massino. Massino told the men to avoid shooting so that bullets wouldn't spray around the room. Massino also brought drop cloths and ropes for disposing of the bodies afterwards.

When the capos arrived at the 20/20, Massino and Bonanno mobster Gerlando Sciascia and Frank Lino escorted them to the store room. As the men entered the room, Sciascia brushed his hand through his hair, giving the prearranged signal. Vitale and the gunmen rushed out of the closet, with Rizzuto yelling "it's a hold up". Massino immediately punched Giaccone, knocking him to the floor, and also stopping Indelicato from escaping. Giaccone got up and tried to run out of the room, but was blocked up against a wall with Trinchera. The gunmen killed Giaccone with a volley of submachine gun fire. The three capos were unarmed, as was the rule when attending a peace meeting. Lino, who had escaped, was brought instead of Indelicato's son, but was quickly won over to Massino's side.

After the killings, the Bonanno gunmen transported the three bodies to a lot in Lindenwood, Queens, in an area known as The Hole.

The lot was a Gambino mob graveyard; Gambino crime family capo John Gotti arranged for his men to bury the bodies there as a favor to Massino. A few weeks later, on May 28, authorities discovered Indelicato's body and removed it from the lot.

In October 2004, after some children reported finding a body in the Lindenwood lot, FBI agents excavated the property and discovered the bodies of Trinchera and Giaccone. Among the personal items they unearthed was a Piaget watch that had belonged to Giaccone's wife. In December 2004, the bodies were positively identified as Giaccone and Trinchera.

On June 23, 2005, Massino, then a government witness to avoid the death penalty, pleaded guilty to several murders including those of Giaccone, Trinchera, and Indelicato. He received two life sentences in prison. Before pronouncing the sentence, Judge Garaufis made these remarks:

"The activities, rituals and personalities of the world of organized crime have been deeply romanticized in the popular media over the past 30 years. However, this trial, like so many trials before it, has portrayed the true nature of organized crime."

The judge also read a letter by Laura Trinchera: "As for Mr. Massino, he had the opportunity to see his family grow. He took that away from us." When the verdicts were read, some Trinchera family members clapped. "I'm happy I was here to support his mandatory life sentence", said Donna Trinchera. "I think he's a disgrace."

On May 4, 2007, after being extradited to the United States, Rizzuto pleaded guilty in a Brooklyn court to reduced charges in the murder of three capos and was sentenced to ten years in state prison.

== In popular culture ==
- In the 1997 film Donnie Brasco, Dominick Trinchera was portrayed by George Angelica. He is shown being murdered in the basement of his house, first with a shotgun blast that tears open his stomach and then with a hammer to the back of the neck, as opposed to the actual account of his death where he was shot with a submachine gun in the back of a nightclub.
- In the 2017 Canadian TV series Bad Blood, in a flashback, Big Trin was portrayed by Carmine Luccarelli.

== See also ==
- List of solved missing person cases

== books ==
- DeStefano, Anthony. The Last Godfather: Joey Massino & the Fall of the Bonanno Crime Family. California: Citadel, 2006.
- Pistone, Joseph, Donnie Brasco: My Undercover Life in the Mafia. Random House Value Publishing (February 1990) ISBN 5-552-53129-9
