= Joseph Massino =

American mobster (1943–2023)

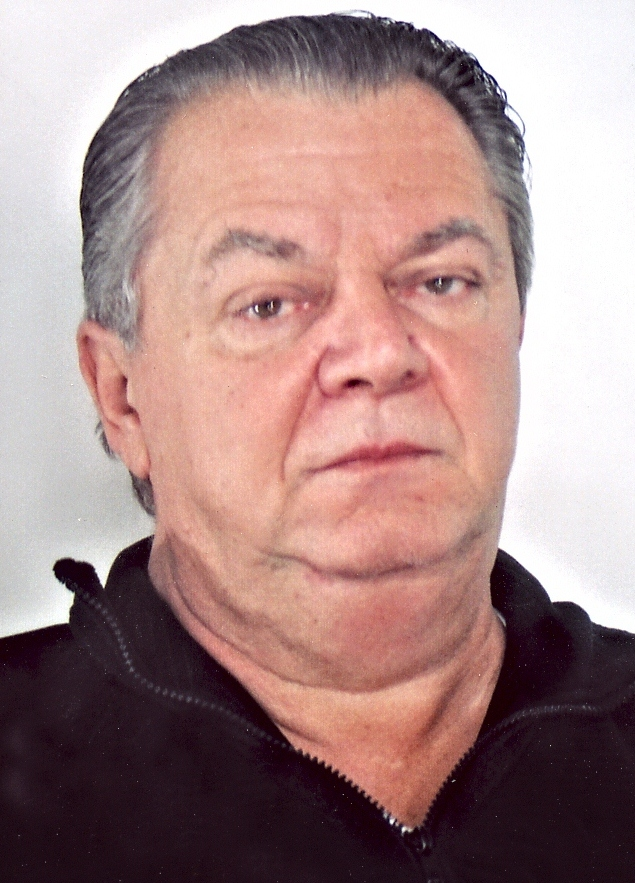
- Massino's 2003 FBI mugshot
- Born: Joseph Charles Massino; January 10, 1943; New York City, New York, U.S.
- Died: September 14, 2023 (aged 80); Glen Cove, New York, U.S.
- Other names: "Big Joey"; "The Ear"; "The Last Don"; "Gigi"; "Joe Wagons"; "Joe Maspeth"; "Ralph Rogers"
- Occupation: Crime boss
- Predecessor: Philip Rastelli
- Successor: Vincent Basciano
- Spouse: Josephine Vitale Massino (m. 1960)
- Children: 3
- Relatives: Salvatore Vitale (brother-in-law)
- Allegiance: Bonanno crime family
- Convictions: Labor racketeering (1986); Murder (2004, 2005); Arson, extortion, loansharking, illegal gambling, money laundering (2004)
- Penalty: 10 years' imprisonment (1987); Life imprisonment (2005)

Joseph Charles Massino (January 10, 1943 – September 14, 2023) was an American mobster. He was a member of the Mafia and boss of the Bonanno crime family from 1991 until 2004, when he became the first boss of one of the Five Families in New York City to turn state's evidence.

Massino was a protégé of Philip Rastelli, who took control of the Bonanno family in 1973. Rastelli spent most of his reign in and out of prison but was able to get the assassination of Carmine Galante, a mobster vying for power, approved in 1979. Originally a truck hijacker, Massino secured his own power after arranging two 1981 gang murders, first a triple murder of three rebel captains, then his rival Dominick Napolitano. In 1991, while Massino was in prison for a 1986 labor racketeering conviction, Rastelli died and Massino succeeded him. Upon his release the following year, he set about rebuilding a family that had been in turmoil for almost a quarter of a century. By the dawn of the new millennium, he was reckoned as the most powerful Mafia leader in the nation. Massino became known as "The Last Don", the only full-fledged New York boss of his time who was not in prison.

In July 2004, Massino was convicted in a RICO case based on the testimony of several cooperating made men, including Massino's disgruntled underboss and brother-in-law Salvatore Vitale. He was also facing the death penalty if convicted in a separate murder trial due to be held later that year, but after agreeing to testify against his former associates, he was sentenced to life imprisonment for both indictments in 2005. Massino testified twice for the government, helping to secure a murder conviction against his acting boss Vincent Basciano in 2011, and was resentenced to time served in 2013.

== Early years ==
Joseph Massino was born in New York City on January 10, 1943. He was one of three sons of Anthony and Adeline Massino, both of whom traced their familial origin to the Italian city of Naples. Raised in Maspeth, Queens, Massino admitted to being a juvenile delinquent by the age of 12 and claimed to have run away to Florida at age 14. He dropped out of Grover Cleveland High School in tenth grade.

Massino first met his future wife Josephine Vitale in 1956, and married her in 1960. The couple had three daughters. Massino also befriended Josephine's brother, Salvatore Vitale, who, after briefly serving in the United States Army, became one of Massino's most trusted allies. While athletic in youth, Massino grew overweight in adulthood, and earned the nickname "Big Joey". During a 1987 racketeering trial, when he asked FBI agent Joseph Pistone who was to play him in a film adaptation of his undercover work, Pistone joked that they could not find anyone fat enough. By 2004, Massino was suffering from diabetes and high blood pressure.

After turning state's evidence, Massino claimed his first murder victim was a Bonanno crime family associate named Tommy Zummo, whom he shot dead in 1969. The killing aroused the ire of Philip "Rusty" Rastelli, a Maspeth-based Bonanno caporegime (captain, or head of a "crew"), but he remained unaware of Massino's participation, and a nephew of Rastelli ultimately helped Massino become his protégé. Rastelli would set Massino up as a lunch wagon operator as part of his "Workmen's Mobile Lunch Association," an effective protection racket; after paying a kickback to Rastelli in the form of membership dues, Massino was assured no competition where he operated.

== Bonanno crime family ==
=== Rise to power ===
By the late 1960s, Massino was a Bonanno associate. He led a successful truck hijacking crew, with the assistance of his brother-in-law Salvatore Vitale and carjacker Duane Leisenheimer, while fencing the stolen goods and running numbers using the lunch wagon as a front. Massino also befriended another hijacker, future Gambino crime family boss John Gotti. Increasingly prosperous, Massino opened his own catering company, J&J Catering, which became another front for his activities.

In 1973, Natale Evola, the boss of the Bonnano family, died. On February 23, 1974, at a meeting at the Americana Hotel in Manhattan, the Commission, the American Mafia's governing body, named Rastelli as Evola's successor. On April 23, 1976, Rastelli was convicted of extortion, and on August 27 was sentenced to ten years in prison. In his absence, Carmine Galante, a former consigliere and convicted drug trafficker, seized control of the family as unofficial acting boss.

In 1975, Massino and Vitale participated in the murder of Vito Borelli, whom Massino claimed was primarily executed by Gotti at the behest of Paul Castellano of the Gambino family. The Borelli hit was significant for Massino in that he "made his bones"—proved his loyalty to the Mafia by killing on its behalf—and put him close to becoming a "made man" (full member) in the Bonanno family. Massino also arranged the 1976 murder of one of his hijackers, Joseph Pastore, after having Vitale borrow $9,000 from him on his behalf. While later acquitted of the crime, both Vitale and Massino would admit to participation after turning state's evidence.

In March 1975, Massino was arrested along with of one of his hijackers, Raymond Wean, and charged with conspiracy to receive stolen goods. He was scheduled to go on trial in 1977, but the charges were dropped after he successfully argued that he had not been properly mirandized, disqualifying statements Massino had given to police from being used in trial.

On June 14, 1977, Massino was inducted into the Bonanno family along with Anthony Spero, Joseph Chilli Jr. and a group of other men in a ceremony conducted by Carmine Galante. He worked as a soldier in James Galante's crew, and later in the crew of Philip "Phil Lucky" Giaccone. Massino nevertheless remained loyal to Rastelli, then vying to oust Carmine Galante despite his imprisonment. Fearing Galante wanted him dead for insubordination, Massino delivered a request to the Commission on Rastelli's behalf to have Galante killed. The hit was approved and executed on July 12, 1979; Rastelli subsequently took full control of the family and rewarded Massino's loyalty by promoting him to caporegime.

By the beginning of the 1980s, Massino ran his crew from the J&S Cake social club, a property just behind J&J Catering. The building was seized in 1988 during a crackdown on the Bonannos' illegal gambling activities.

=== Three capos and Napolitano murders ===
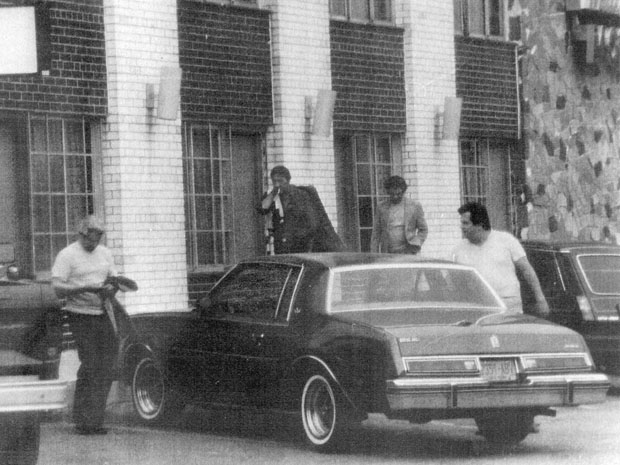
From left to right: Gerlando Sciascia, Vito Rizzuto, Giovanni Ligammari and Joey Massino in 1981

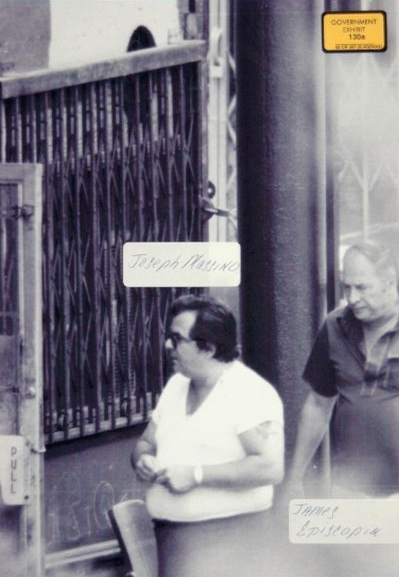
FBI surveillance photo of Massino and James Episcopia

Following the Galante hit, Massino began jockeying for power with Dominick "Sonny Black" Napolitano, another caporegime and Rastelli loyalist. Both men were themselves threatened by another faction seeking to depose the absentee boss, led by capos Giaccone, Alphonse "Sonny Red" Indelicato and Dominick "Big Trin" Trincera. The Commission initially tried to maintain neutrality, but in 1981 Massino got word from his informants that the three capos were stocking up on automatic weapons and planning to wipe out the Rastelli loyalists to take complete control of the family. Massino turned to Colombo family boss Carmine Persico and Gambino family boss Paul Castellano for advice; they told him to act immediately.

Massino, Napolitano and Gerlando Sciascia, a Sicilian-born capo linked to the Montreal Rizzuto crime family, arranged a meeting at a Brooklyn social club with the three capos for May 5, 1981. They had four gunmen, including Vitale and Bonanno-affiliated Montreal boss Vito Rizzuto, hiding in a closet to ambush them. When Trinchera, Giaccone and Indelicato arrived with Frank Lino to meet Massino, they were shot to death, with Massino himself stopping Indelicato from escaping. Lino escaped unscathed by running out the door. The hit further improved Massino's prestige, but was marred by both Lino's escape and the discovery of Indelicato's body on May 28.

Massino quickly won Lino over to his side, but Indelicato's son, Anthony "Bruno" Indelicato, vowed revenge. Napolitano assigned associate Donnie Brasco, who he hoped to induct as a made man, to kill the younger Indelicato. "Brasco," however, was in fact an undercover FBI agent named Joseph Pistone; shortly after the hit was ordered, Pistone's assignment was ended and Napolitano was informed of the family's infiltration.

Already skeptical of Napolitano's support of "Brasco," Massino was deeply disturbed by the breach of security when he learned of the agent's true identity. Vitale would later testify that this was the reason Massino subsequently decided to murder Napolitano as well; as he would later quote Massino: "I have to give him a receipt for the Donnie Brasco situation." In his own testimony, Massino instead claimed Napolitano was targeted for trying to take over the family himself. On August 17, Lino and Steven Cannone drove Napolitano to the house of Ronald Filocomo, a Bonanno family associate, for a meeting. Napolitano was greeted by caporegime Frank Coppa, then thrown down into the basement by Lino and shot to death. Napolitano's body was discovered the following year.

Benjamin "Lefty" Ruggiero, who helped Pistone formally become a Bonanno associate, was also targeted, but was arrested en route to the meeting where he was expected to be murdered. On February 18, 1982, Anthony Mirra, the soldier who first "discovered" Pistone, was assassinated on Massino's orders. Mirra had gone into hiding upon Pistone's exposure but was ultimately betrayed and murdered by his protégé and cousin, Joseph D'Amico.

=== Fugitive and Bonventre murder ===
On November 23, 1981, based on information gained by Pistone's infiltration, six Bonanno mobsters, including the then-missing Napolitano, were indicted on racketeering charges and conspiracy in the triple hit on Giaccone, Trincera and the elder Indelicato.

In March 1982, Massino was tipped off by a Colombo-associated FBI insider that he was about to be indicted and went into hiding in Pennsylvania with Leisenheimer. On March 25, 1982, Massino was also charged with conspiracy to murder Indelicato, Giaccone and Trinchera and truck hijacking. In hiding, Massino was able to see the prosecution's strategy and better plan his defense as well as eventually face trial without association with other mobsters. Pistone later speculated Massino also feared retaliation upon the revelation that his associate, Raymond Wean, had turned state's evidence. Massino was visited by many fellow mobsters, including Gotti, and Vitale would secretly deliver cash to support him.

On April 21, 1983, Rastelli was paroled, and he and Massino immediately ordered the murder of Bonanno caporegime Cesare Bonventre, the leader of the family's Sicilian faction. Still a fugitive, Massino summoned Vitale, Louis Attanasio and James Tartaglione to his hideout and gave them the order. By this time, even though Rastelli was still officially head of the family, Massino was considered by most mobsters to be the family's street boss in all but name, as well as Rastelli's heir apparent. According to Vitale, Massino had Bonventre killed for giving him no support when he was in hiding.

In April 1984, Bonventre was called to a meeting with Rastelli in Queens. He was picked up by Vitale and Attanasio and driven to a garage. En route, Attanasio shot Bonventre twice in the head but only wounded him; he would kill Bonventre with two more shots when they reached their destination. The task of disposing of Bonventre's corpse was handed to Gabriel Infanti, who promised Vitale that Bonventre's remains would disappear forever. However, after a tipoff, the remains were discovered on April 16 in a warehouse in Garfield, New Jersey, stuffed into two 55-gallon glue drums. For his part in the hit, Massino had Vitale initiated into the Bonanno family.

=== 1986 conviction and 1987 acquittal ===
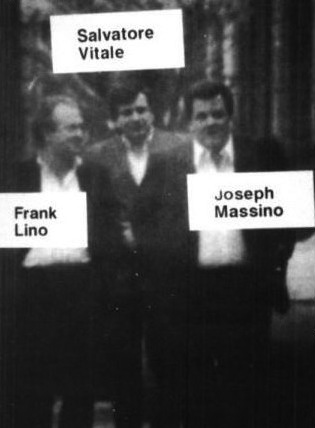
FBI surveillance photograph of Joseph Massino, Salvatore Vitale and Frank Lino. The three men are headed to the wake of former Gambino crime family underboss Frank DeCicco, in April 1986.

Through Gotti associate Angelo Ruggiero, Massino was able to meet with defense attorney John Pollok in 1984 to negotiate his surrender. He finally turned himself in on July 7 and was released on $350,000 bail. That year, Massino and Salvatore Vitale secured no-show jobs with the Long Island based King Caterers in exchange for protecting them from Lucchese extortion.

In 1985, Massino was indicted twice more, first as a co-conspirator with Rastelli in a labor racketeering case for controlling the Teamsters Local 814, then with a conspiracy charge for the Pastore murder that was added to the original three capos indictment. The second indictment also charged Vitale as a co-conspirator in the hijacking cases.

The labor racketeering trial began in April 1986, with Massino as one of 12 defendants including Rastelli and former underboss Nicholas Marangello. While Massino protested in confidence to other mobsters he never had the opportunity to profit from the racket, he was implicated by both Pistone and union official Anthony Gilberti, and on October 15, 1986, was found guilty of racketeering charges for accepting kickbacks on the Bonannos' behalf. On January 16, 1987, Massino was sentenced to 10 years' imprisonment, his first prison term. Rastelli, also convicted and in poor health during the trial, was sentenced to 12 years in prison. Around this time, Massino was believed to be the Bonanno family's official underboss. With Rastelli in declining health, Massino was also reckoned as the operating head of the family, though consigliere Anthony "Old Man" Spero was nominally acting boss.

In April 1987, Massino and Vitale went on trial for truck hijacking and conspiracy to commit the triple murder, defended by Samuel H. Dawson and Bruce Cutler respectively. Prosecutor Michael Chertoff, describing Massino's rise in his opening statements, would characterize him as the "Horatio Alger of the mob". Raymond Wean and Joseph Pistone testified against Massino, but both proved unable to conclusively link Massino with any of the murder charges. On June 3, while both men were convicted on hijacking charges, they were cleared of the murder conspiracy charges. Further, the only proven criminal acts took place outside the RICO act's five-year statute of limitations; without evidence that the "criminal enterprise" was still active in this timeframe the jury returned a special verdict clearing Massino and Vitale of these charges as well.

During Massino's imprisonment at Talladega Federal Prison for his 1986 conviction, Vitale functioned as his messenger, effectively becoming co-acting boss alongside Spero. On Massino's orders, Vitale organized the murder of Gabriel Infanti, who had also botched a 1982 hit on Anthony Gilberti and was suspected of being an informant.

== Bonanno boss ==
=== The family regroups ===
During his meetings with Massino in prison, Vitale, on behalf of the Bonannos' capos, urged his brother-in-law to become boss in name as well as in fact. Rastelli had spent all but two years of his reign behind bars, and many felt Massino would bring the family stability. Massino was reluctant to take over as long as Rastelli was alive. Not only was he respectful of Rastelli's sponsorship of his Mafia career, but Mafia tradition dictates that a boss keeps his title for life unless he abdicates. However, in the spring of 1991, Massino ordered Vitale to "make me boss" as soon as Rastelli died; Rastelli died on June 24, 1991. A few days after his funeral, Massino instructed Vitale to call a meeting of the family's capos, and Massino was acclaimed as boss.

Massino was granted two years' supervised release on November 13, 1992. During that time, he could not associate with convicted mafiosi. To get around this restriction, Massino named Vitale underboss and retained him as his messenger for the duration of his supervised release. While the FBI suspected Vitale was a mafioso, he had never been convicted of a Mafia-related crime. The FBI would thus have no reason to be suspicious of him associating with Massino since they were brothers-in-law. He returned to his job at King Caterers, and in 1996 became co-owner of Casablanca, a well-reviewed Maspeth Italian restaurant.

Massino was 48 years old at the time of his accession and knew that he potentially had a long reign ahead of him. With this in mind, he was determined to avoid the pitfalls that landed other Mafia bosses in prison. Inspired by Genovese boss Vincent "The Chin" Gigante, Massino forbade his men from saying his name out loud due to FBI surveillance. Instead, they were to touch their ears when referring to him. Massino gained the nickname "The Ear" because of this. Massino took a great number of precautions in regards to security and the possibility of anything incriminating being picked up on a wiretap. He closed the family's longtime social clubs. He also arranged family meetings to be conducted in remote locations within the United States. In some cases, he held meetings in foreign countries, and had his capos bring their wives along so they could be passed off as vacations. Remembering how Pistone's infiltration had damaged the family, he also decreed that all prospective made men had to have a working relationship with an incumbent member for at least eight years before becoming made, in hopes of ensuring new mafiosi were as reliable as possible. Unusually for bosses of his era, he actively encouraged his men to have their sons made as well. In Massino's view, this would make it less likely that a capo would turn informer, since if that happened the defector's son would face almost certain death.

To minimize the damage from informants or undercover investigations Massino decentralized the family's organization. He created a clandestine cell system for his crews, forbidding them from contacting one another and avoiding meeting their capos. He would instead create a new committee that would relay his orders to the crews. In contrast to his contemporaries, particularly the publicity-friendly Gotti and the conspicuous feigned insanity of Gigante, Massino himself was also able to operate with a relatively low public profile; both Pistone and mob writer Jerry Capeci would consequently refer to Massino as the "last of the old-time gangsters".

A side effect of these reforms was the reduction of Vitale, in his own words, to "a figurehead". By the time of Massino's release the Bonanno family had grown tired of Vitale, regarding him as greedy and overstepping his authority. In the new structure of the family, Vitale lost the underboss's usual role as a go-between for the boss, as well as the share of the family's profits those duties entailed, and Massino made it clear to Vitale his unpopularity was a factor in these changes. Vitale remained loyal, however, and helped Massino organize the March 18, 1999 murder of Gerlando Sciascia. Massino indicated to fellow mobsters that Sciascia was killed for feuding with fellow Massino-confidant capo Anthony Graziano, accusing him of using cocaine, while in his own testimony Massino claimed Sciascia was killed for killing another mobster's son. Sciascia's body was not covertly buried but instead left to be discovered in a street in the Bronx, an attempt to make the hit look like a botched drug deal rather than a Mafia-ordered hit, and Massino had his capos attend Sciascia's funeral.

Shortly after becoming boss, Massino announced that his men should no longer consider themselves as part of the Bonanno family. Instead, he renamed it the Massino family, after himself. Like many mafiosi, he was angered at family namesake Joseph Bonanno's tell-all autobiography, A Man of Honor, and regarded it as a violation of the code of omertà. He told Vitale that in his view, "Joe Bonanno disrespected the family by ratting." The new name was first disclosed after Massino was indicted in 2003 and did not catch on outside the Mafia.

=== Relations with other families ===
Before Massino became boss, John Gotti was one of his closest allies. Massino had backed Gotti in his plot to take over the Gambino family, and as Gambino boss, Gotti tried to get Massino a seat on the Commission as the Bonannos' acting boss. Gotti was reportedly infuriated that Massino had been officially promoted without him being consulted, and Massino would later testify he believed Gotti conspired with Vitale to kill him. Gotti, however, was marginalized by his 1992 racketeering and murder conviction and consequent life imprisonment. Massino, for his own part, was angered at Gotti's high public profile and later criticized Gotti for killing Gotti's predecessor, Paul Castellano. Massino also had a poor relationship with Vincent Gigante, who had backed the opposition to Rastelli and blocked Gotti's attempts to bring Massino onto the Commission.

The Bonanno family had been in decline for the better part of the last quarter century since Joe Bonanno's ousting in the 1960s, and it was kicked off the Commission altogether following Pistone's infiltration. By the late 1990s, the situation was reversed and the Bonanno family was now reckoned as the most powerful crime family in New York and the nation, in no small part because Massino was the only full-fledged New York boss who was not imprisoned. Being thrown off the Commission worked in the Bonannos' favor; they were the only family whose leadership wasn't decimated in the Mafia Commission Trial. Wary of surveillance, Massino generally avoided meeting with members of other Mafia families and encouraged his crews to operate independently as well. In January 2000, however, Massino did preside over an informal Commission meeting with the acting bosses of the other four families. As the most powerful Mafia leader in both New York and the United States, Massino was in a position to make general policies for the Five Families. Under his direction, the Commission tightened qualifications to become a made man, requiring candidates have full Italian descent (previously having an Italian-American father was the minimum requirement) and imposed restrictions on initiating associates convicted on drug charges.

According to Capeci, the murder of Sciascia soured relations between the Bonanno and Rizzuto families. Originally considered merely a Canadian Bonanno crew, the Rizzutos responded by taking even less heed from New York.

=== Run-up to prosecution ===
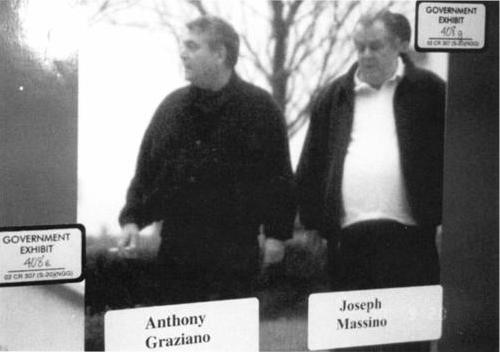
FBI surveillance photograph of Massino and Anthony Graziano

At the beginning of his reign as boss, Massino had limited FBI attention. In 1987, with the Bonannos weakened, the FBI merged its Bonanno squad with its Colombo family squad, and this squad was initially preoccupied with the Colombos' third internal war. Another dedicated Bonanno squad would be established in 1996.

The Bonanno squad's chief, Jack Stubing, was well aware of the measures Massino had taken to avoid scrutiny. He therefore decided to go after Massino with a defensive approach. He convinced his bosses to lend him a pair of forensic accountants normally used in fraud investigations, believing that they could easily pinpoint conspirators in the family's money laundering schemes. Stubing believed that the threat of long prison sentences would be sufficient to get any conspirators to turn informer, and thus make it easier to trace how the money flowed to Massino. In the meantime the FBI also targeted other members of the Bonanno administration. In 1995, consigliere Anthony Spero was sentenced to two years' imprisonment after being convicted of loansharking, then to life imprisonment in 2002 for murder. Graziano would assume Spero's duties, but he too pleaded guilty to racketeering charges in December 2002 and was sentenced to 10 years' imprisonment. Vitale would also plead guilty to loansharking charges in June 2002. Vitale was not immediately sentenced, and was placed under house arrest in the interim, but the relatively low maximum sentence he was eligible for led Massino to wrongly suspect he was cooperating with law enforcement. He secretly ordered that, if he was arrested, Vitale was to be "taken down"—demoted or killed.

Until 2002, the Bonannos had been the only family in the modern history of the New York Mafia (i. e., since the Castellammarese War) to have never had a made man turn informant or government witness. Massino used this as a point of pride to rally his crime family. That year Frank Coppa, convicted on fraud and facing further charges from the FBI's forensic accounting investigation, became the first to turn state's evidence. He was followed shortly by acting underboss Richard Cantarella, a participant in the Mirra murder, who was facing racketeering and murder charges. A third, Joseph D'Amico, subsequently turned state's evidence with the knowledge that Cantarella could implicate him for murder. All of these defections left Massino vulnerable to serious charges.

== 2004 conviction ==
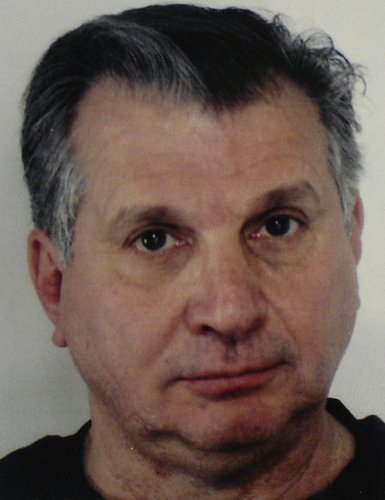
Salvatore Vitale, Massino's brother-in-law and underboss, turned state's evidence in 2003.

On January 9, 2003, Massino was arrested and indicted, alongside Vitale, Frank Lino and capo Daniel Mongelli, in a comprehensive racketeering indictment. The charges against Massino himself included ordering the 1981 murder of Napolitano. Massino was denied bail, and Vincent Basciano took over as acting boss in his absence. Massino hired David Breitbart, an attorney he had originally wanted to represent him in his 1987 trial, for his defense.

Three more Bonanno made men would choose to cooperate before Massino came to trial. The first was James Tartaglione; anticipating he would shortly be indicted as well he went to the FBI and agreed to wear a wire while he remained free. The second was Salvatore Vitale. In custody Massino again put out the word, to a receptive Bonanno family, that he wanted Vitale killed. After learning of Massino's earlier plans to kill his brother-in-law from Coppa and Cantarella, prosecutors informed Vitale. Vitale was already dissatisfied by the lack of support he and his family received from Massino after his arrest. On the day he was arraigned with Massino, Vitale decided to flip as soon as it was safe to do so; he formally reached a deal with prosecutors in February. He was followed in short order by Lino, knowing Vitale could implicate him in murder as well. Also flipping was longtime Bonanno associate Duane Leisenheimer, concerned for his safety after an investigator for Massino's defense team visited to find out if he intended to flip.

With these defections, Massino was slapped with a superseding indictment charging him with seven additional murders: the three capos (this time for participation in the murder itself rather than conspiracy), Mirra, Bonventre, Infanti and Sciascia. Of particular interest was the Sciascia hit, which took place after a 1994 amendment to racketeering laws that allowed the death penalty for murder in aid of racketeering.

Massino's trial began on May 24, 2004, with judge Nicholas Garaufis presiding and Greg D. Andres and Robert Henoch heading the prosecution. He now faced 11 RICO counts for seven murders (due to the prospect of prosecutors seeking the death penalty for the Sciascia murder, that case was severed to be tried separately), arson, extortion, loansharking, illegal gambling, and money laundering. By this time, Time magazine had dubbed Massino as "the Last Don", in reference to his status as the only New York boss not serving a prison sentence at that point. The name stuck.

Despite a weak start, with opening witness Anthony Gilberti unable to recognize Massino in the courtroom, the prosecution would establish its case to link Massino with the charges in the indictment through an unprecedented seven major turncoats, including the six turned made men. Vitale, the last of the six to take the stand, was of particular significance. He had spent most of his three decades in the Mafia as a close confidant to Massino, and his closeness to his brother-in-law allowed him to cover Massino's entire criminal history in his testimony. Breitbart's defense rested primarily on cross-examination of the prosecution witnesses, with his only witness being an FBI agent to challenge Vitale's reliability. His defense was also unusual in that he made no attempt to contest that Massino was the Bonanno boss, instead stressing the murders in the case took place before he took over and that Massino himself "showed a love of life...because the murders ceased." Vitale had admitted to 11 murders, but for his cooperation, was sentenced to time served in October 2010, and entered the witness protection program.

After deliberating for five days, the jury found Massino guilty of all 11 counts on July 30, 2004. His sentencing was initially scheduled for October 12, and he was expected to receive a sentence of life imprisonment with no possibility of parole. The jury also approved the prosecutors' recommended $10 million forfeiture of the proceeds of his reign as Bonanno boss on the day of the verdict.

== Turning state's evidence ==
Immediately after his July 30 conviction, as court was adjourned, Massino requested a meeting with Judge Garaufis, where he made his first offer to cooperate. He did so in hopes of sparing his life; he was facing the death penalty if found guilty of Sciascia's murder; one of John Ashcroft's final acts as Attorney General was to order federal prosecutors to seek the death penalty for Massino. Massino thus stood to be the first Mafia boss to be executed since Lepke Buchalter was executed in 1944.

Massino subsequently claimed he decided to turn informer due to the prospect of his wife and mother having to forfeit their houses to the government. Mob authors and journalists Anthony D. DeStefano and Selwyn Raab both consider the turning of so many made men as a factor in disillusioning Massino with Cosa Nostra, the former also assuming Massino had decided to flip "long before the verdict". Massino was the first sitting boss of a New York crime family to turn state's evidence, and the second in the history of the American Mafia to do so (Philadelphia crime family boss Ralph Natale had flipped in 1999 when facing drug charges). It also marked the second time in a little more than a year that a New York boss had reached a plea bargain; Gigante had pleaded guilty to obstruction of justice charges in 2003 after prosecutors unmasked his long charade of feigning insanity.

At his advice, that October the FBI revisited the Queens mob graveyard where Alphonse Indelicato's body was found, and unearthed the bodies of Trinchera and Giaccone as well. They also hoped to find the body of John Favara, who accidentally killed Gotti's son, and the body of Tommy DeSimone. Massino also reported that Vincent Basciano, arrested in November, had conspired to kill prosecutor Greg Andres, but after failing a polygraph test regarding the discussion he agreed to wear a wire when meeting the acting boss in jail. While Massino was unable to extract an unambiguous confession regarding Andres, he did record Basciano freely admit to ordering the murder of associate Randolph Pizzolo.

By the end of January 2005, when Basciano was indicted for the Pizzolo murder, Massino was identified by news sources as the then-anonymous fellow mobster who secretly recorded his confession, to the public disgust of Massino's family. Further confirmation of Massino's defection came in February as he was identified as the source for the graveyard, then in May when the Justice Department dropped the threat of the death penalty regarding the Sciascia case. In a hearing on June 23, 2005, Massino finalized his deal and pleaded guilty to ordering the Sciascia murder. For this and his 2004 conviction he was sentenced to two consecutive life sentences, with a possible reduction depending on his service as a witness. That same day Josephine Massino negotiated a settlement to satisfy the forfeiture claim, keeping the homes of herself and Massino's mother as well as some rental properties while turning over, among other assets, a cache of $7 million and hundreds of gold bars, both of which were kept in his Howard Beach home, and the Casablanca restaurant.

Massino was not replaced as Bonanno boss until 2013 when Michael Mancuso, who had replaced Basciano as acting boss, was reported to have formally assumed the title.

=== Testimony and release ===
Massino was conspicuously absent from the prosecution witnesses at the 2006 racketeering trial of Basciano, the prosecution deciding he was not yet needed; he was also expected to testify against Vito Rizzuto regarding his role in the three capos murder, but the Montreal boss accepted a plea bargain in May 2007 before Rizzuto's case went to trial. He finally made his debut as a witness at Basciano's trial for the murder of Randolph Pizzolo in April 2011; Massino's testified both during the trial itself and, after Basciano was convicted, on behalf of the prosecution's unsuccessful attempt to impose the death penalty. During his testimony Massino noted, as a result of his cooperation, "I'm hoping to see a light at the end of the tunnel."

Massino testified again in the 2012 extortion trial of Genovese capo Anthony Romanello, primarily to provide background as an expert on the American Mafia. While Massino had not worked closely with Romanello, prosecutors decided to use him after another mobster-turned-witness was dropped; the case ended in an acquittal. Massino had also been considered as a witness in the 2013 murder trial of Colombo acting boss Joel Cacace, but was dropped after he was unable to fully remember the meeting where he claimed Cacace indicated his involvement in the murder of NYPD officer Ralph Dols.

In June 2013, the U.S. Department of Justice filed a request to Judge Garaufis for a reduction of Massino's sentence; prosecutors cited both the impact of Massino's unprecedented cooperation and his failing health as reasons for a reduction of his sentence. Garaufis granted their request on July 10, resentencing Massino to time served and supervised release for the remainder of his life.

Massino lived out his final years in the Federal Witness Protection Program, residing at an upscale retirement community in the Greater Cleveland area under the alias "Ralph Rogers". After he was recognized during a visit to a Downtown Cleveland casino by a man who later confronted him at his retirement home, Massino was instructed by the FBI and U.S. Marshals Service to relocate, although he declined and instead remained in Ohio.

== Death ==
Massino died following a short illness at a rehabilitation facility in Glen Cove, Long Island on September 14, 2023, at the age of 80. He had been living in Ohio until shortly before his death.

American Mafia
Preceded by Salvatore "Sal" Catalano	Bonanno crime family Underboss; 1979–1991	Succeeded by Salvatore "Handsome Sal" Vitale
Preceded by Philip Rastelli	Bonanno crime family Boss; 1991–2004	Succeeded by Vincent Basciano as acting boss
Preceded by John Gotti	Capo di tutti capi Boss of bosses 2002–2004	Succeeded by unknown/position abolished
