= Philip Rastelli =

American mobster

- Born: January 31, 1918; New York City, U.S.
- Died: June 24, 1991 (aged 73); New York City, U.S.
- Occupation: Crime boss
- Predecessor: Natale Evola
- Successor: Joseph Massino
- Spouse: Connie Rastelli
- Allegiance: Bonanno crime family
- Convictions: Extortion (1976); Conspiracy, contempt of court, and usury (1976); Racketeering (1986)
- Penalty: 10 years' imprisonment (1976); Four years' imprisonment (1976); 12 years' imprisonment (1987)

Philip "Rusty" Rastelli (January 31, 1918 – June 24, 1991) was an American mobster and former boss of the Bonanno crime family in New York. He spent all but three years of his reign in prison.

== Biography ==
Rastelli was born and raised in Maspeth, Queens. He had three brothers (Carmine, Marinello, and Augustus) and two sisters (Justina Devita and Antonette Brigandi).

Rastelli was heavily involved in loansharking, extortion and drug trafficking activities before joining the Bonanno crime family. Rastelli also had a lunch wagon business. After moving to Greenpoint, Brooklyn where he lived until his incarceration, he met and became close friends with Dominick "Sonny Black" Napolitano, Carmine Galante, Joseph Bonanno and Joseph Massino.

On December 3, 1953, Rastelli and an associate allegedly shot Michael Russo in Queens. However, Russo survived the shooting and Rastelli, fearing identification, went into hiding. Over the next year, Rastelli's wife Connie repeatedly approached Russo's wife Rose with an offer of $5,000 if her husband did not identify Rastelli. Rose refused the bribe each time. In early December 1954, Russo was shot again and killed in Brooklyn. On December 13, 1954, Connie Rastelli was indicted on charges of attempting to bribe a witness. No one was ever charged in the Russo murder. Connie was believed to have been killed in 1962 after she became an informant; her body was never found.

In 1969, in an attempt to restore order to the Bonanno family, the Commission appointed a three-man panel to run the family. This panel included Rastelli, Joseph DiFilippi, and Natale "Joe Diamonds" Evola.

=== Boss of the Bonanno family ===
On July 21, 1971, Rastelli was indicted in Riverhead, New York on loansharking charges. The loansharking ring, centered in Babylon, New York and Islip, New York, charged victims from 250 to 300% interest annually and generated over $1 million per year in revenue for the Bonanno family. On December 28, 1972, Rastelli was convicted in state court on seven counts of loansharking.

On August 28, 1973, Bonanno boss Evola died of cancer. On February 23, 1974, at a meeting at the Americana Hotel in Manhattan, the Commission named Rastelli as boss. He was the first member of the Queens faction to lead the family; the previous bosses had all come from the family's birthplace in Brooklyn.

Although Rastelli was endorsed by the Commission, the real power in the family soon migrated to rival Carmine Galante, who was released from prison at the same time.

=== First prison term ===
On March 6, 1975, Rastelli was indicted on racketeering charges involving extortion. Nine years earlier, Rastelli had established a trade association of lunch wagon operators and taken control of the industry. Any operator who refused to join the Association and pay its stiff fees faced vandalism and physical assault. On April 23, 1976, Rastelli was convicted of extortion in United States District Court for the Eastern District of New York. On August 27, 1976, Rastelli was sentenced to 10 years in prison, served consecutively to a four-year state sentence for conspiracy, criminal contempt of court, and usury.

He was imprisoned in Lewisburg, Pennsylvania. Rastelli's main contacts to the Bonanno family were mobsters Dominick "Sonny Black" Napolitano and Joseph Massino.

In Rastelli's absence, Galante seized control of the Bonannos as unofficial acting boss. The New York crime families were alarmed at Galante's brazen attempt at taking over the narcotics market. Genovese crime family boss Frank Tieri began contacting Cosa Nostra leaders to build a consensus for Galante's murder, even obtaining approval from the retired Joseph Bonanno. In 1979, they received a boost when Rastelli and Joseph Massino, sought Commission approval to kill Galante; the request was approved. Napolitano was later promoted to caporegime, as well as gunman Anthony Indelicato. Rastelli was now the undisputed boss, controlling things from behind bars through the use of acting bosses such as longtime Bonanno mobster Salvatore "Sally Fruits" Ferrugia.

While Rastelli was in prison, Massino began jockeying for power with Dominick "Sonny Black" Napolitano, another Rastelli loyalist capo. Both men were themselves threatened by another faction seeking to depose the absentee boss led by capos Alphonse "Sonny Red" Indelicato, Dominick "Big Trin" Trincera and Philip Giaccone. The Commission initially tried to maintain neutrality, but in 1981, Massino got word from his informants that the three capos were stocking up on automatic weapons and planning to kill the Rastelli loyalists within the Bonanno family to take complete control. On May 5, 1981, the three capos were murdered.

On April 21, 1983, Rastelli was released from prison, and he and Massino ordered the murder of Bonanno capo Cesare Bonventre. Still a fugitive, Massino summoned Salvatore Vitale, Louis Attanasio and James Tartaglione to his hideout and gave them the order. By this time, even though Rastelli was still officially head of the family, Massino was considered by most mobsters to be the family's street boss and field commander in all but name, as well as Rastelli's heir apparent.

=== Second prison term ===
Rastelli was arrested on a parole violation on August 16, 1984, due to "associat[ing] with persons engaged in criminal activity".

In 1985, Rastelli was indicted along with other Cosa Nostra leaders in the famous Mafia Commission Trial. Getting kicked off the Mafia Commission because of the Donnie Brasco infiltration prevented the Bonanno family from getting caught up in the Commission Trial, which sentenced many Mafia bosses and members to prison. However, when Rastelli was indicted on separate labor racketeering charges, prosecutors decided to remove him from the Commission trial. Having previously lost their seat on the Commission, the Bonannos suffered less exposure than the other families in this case.

On October 14, 1986, Rastelli was convicted on 24 counts of labor racketeering.

On January 16, 1987, Rastelli was sentenced to 12 years in federal prison.

=== Death ===
On June 4, 1991, Rastelli was given a compassionate release from the Federal Medical Center (FMC) in Springfield, Missouri. On June 24, 1991, Rastelli died at Booth Memorial Hospital (now NewYork–Presbyterian Queens) in Flushing, Queens from liver cancer at age 73. Massino took over as boss of the Bonanno family after Rastelli's death.

== Notes ==
- Contract Killer: The Explosive Story of the Mafia's Most Notorious Hit Man, Donald "Tony the Greek" Frankos, by William Hoffman and Lake Headley
- DeStefano, Anthony. The Last Godfather: Joey Massino & the Fall of the Bonanno Crime Family. California: Citadel, 2006.
- Pistone, Joseph D.; & Woodley, Richard (1999) Donnie Brasco: My Undercover Life in the Mafia, Hodder & Stoughton. ISBN 0-340-66637-4.

American Mafia
Preceded by Natale "Joe Diamonds" Evola	Bonanno crime family Underboss; 1971-1973	Succeeded by Nicholas Marangello
Preceded by Natale "Joe Diamonds" Evola	Bonanno crime family Boss; 1973-1991	Succeeded by Joseph Massino
