= Gene Borrello =

Italian-American criminal and government witness

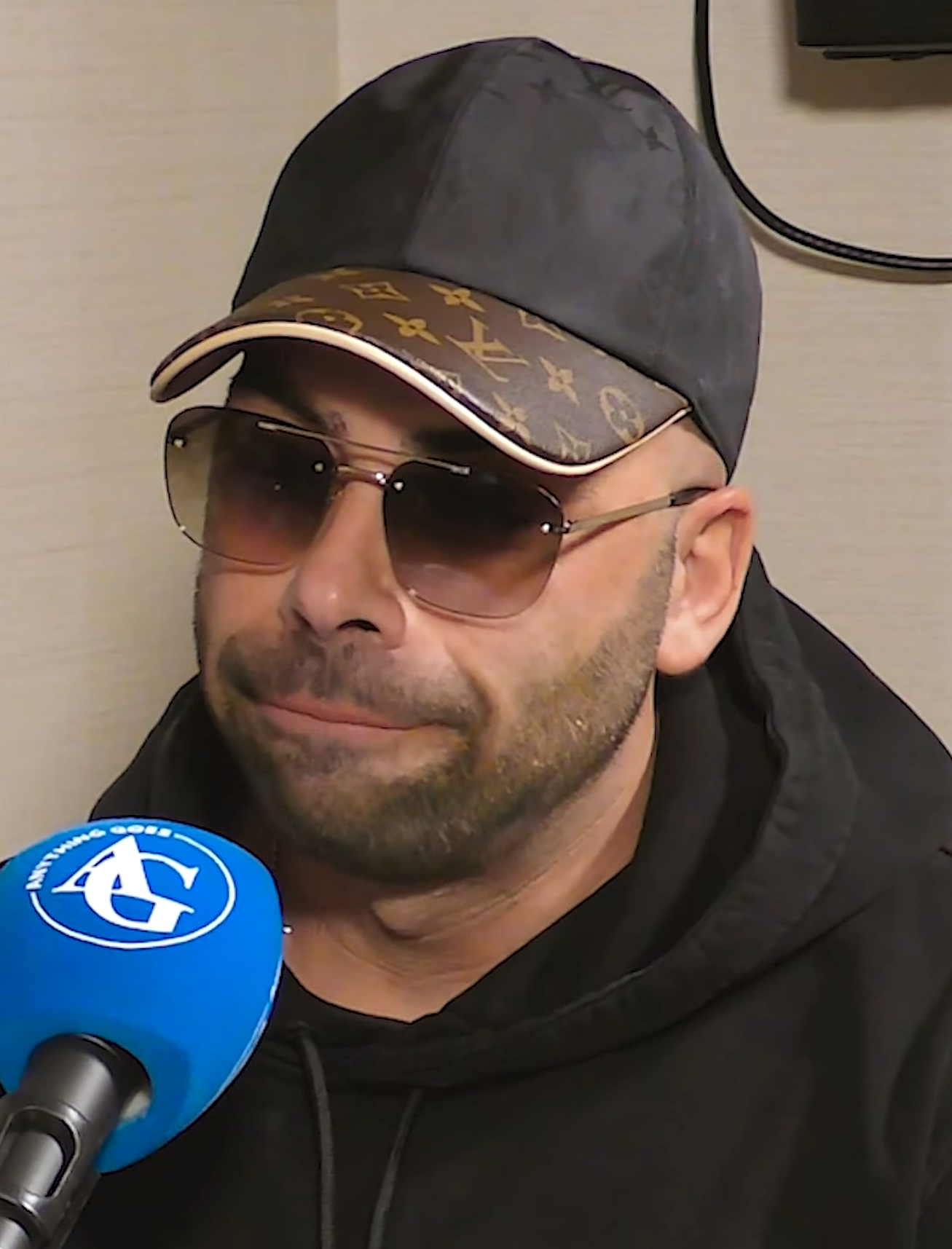
- Borrello in 2024
- Born: June 6, 1984 (age 42); New York City, New York, U.S.
- Occupations: Podcaster, convicted criminal, motivational speaker and author
- Known for: Former Bonanno crime family associate

Gene Borrello (born June 6, 1984) is an American podcaster and convicted criminal who was a former associate of the Bonanno crime family. He later became a government witness, agreeing to testify against crime family members Vincent Asaro and Ronald Giallanzo in 2016. Borrello is now a podcaster, author and motivational speaker.

== History ==
Borrello was part of a violent and brazen home invasion crew in Howard Beach, Queens, before he was arrested for his role in September 2014. In 2016, Borrello agreed to become a government witness, testifying against several Bonanno members, including Vincent Asaro. Asaro had tasked Borrello with burning the car of a man in a severe road rage case.

In 2019, Borrello was released from prison after being sentenced to time served for his cooperation. Following his release, he publicly denounced organized crime and became a podcaster and book author, and became a regular interview subject on his former life of crime.

In February 2021, Borrello was once again arrested for making violent threats towards his ex-girlfriend and her family. He was released on June 21, 2021.

In 2023, Borrello was incarcerated at the Metropolitan Detention Center in Brooklyn, where his time overlapped with Sam Bankman-Fried who was awaiting trial for numerous charges relating to the downfall of FTX and Alameda Research. Their interactions and Borrello's observations of Sam were the focus of an interview conducted by citizen journalist Tiffany Fong and published on her YouTube channel.

On August 16, 2023, according to prison records, Borrello got into a fight with another inmate whom Borrello claimed was attempting to intimidate and potentially extort Bankman-Fried. Responding guards were able to separate the two inmates, with both being sent to the SHU. Borrello was released on September 20, 2023. Upon release, Borrello had spent a total of 13 years of his life in prison.
