= Vincent Badalamenti =

American mobster

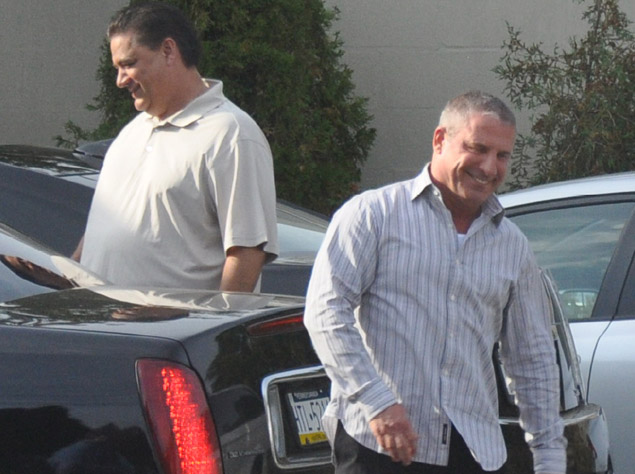
- Vincent Badalamenti (left) with Vito Balsamo
- Born: 1958 (age 67–68); Brooklyn, New York City, New York, U.S.
- Other name: "Vinny TV"
- Occupation: Mobster
- Allegiance: Bonanno crime family
- Conviction: Nonviolent collection of an unlawful debt (2012)
- Penalty: 18 months' imprisonment (2012)

Vincent Badalamenti (born 1958) is an American mobster who was acting boss of the Bonanno crime family.

== Biography ==
Badalamenti is the owner of Bagels Plus a bagel store in Bensonhurst, Brooklyn. He received his nickname "Vinny TV", because he used to own a Brooklyn electronics store. It is also alleged that Badalamenti controls a mob social club on 20th Avenue and 72nd Street in Bensonhurst, Brooklyn.

In January 2012, Badalamenti was indicted along with capo Nicholas Santora, soldiers Vito Balsamo and Anthony Calabrese, and Gambino crime family associate James LaForte. Badalamenti was charged with extorting restaurants and bars in Brooklyn and Manhattan and extending a $50,000 loanshark loan in 1999. These charges were primarily based on information from government informant Hector Pagan (Anthony Graziano's ex son-in-law).

On February 6, 2012, Maryann Santiago filed a lawsuit against three restaurants, including Bagels Plus, accusing the stores of violating the Americans With Disabilities Act. The next day, Santiago withdrew her lawsuit against Bagels Plus, allegedly after finding out that Badalamenti was the owner.

In April 2012, Badalamenti pleaded guilty to nonviolent collection of an unlawful debt, as prosecutors dropped racketeering and extortion charges. After a postponement in sentencing in August 2012, Badalamenti was sentenced to 18 months in prison on September 25. On May 16, 2013 Badalamenti was released from the Federal Correctional Institution, Fort Dix in Fort Dix, New Jersey.

== Notes ==
American Mafia
Preceded by Salvatore Montagna	Bonanno crime family Acting Boss; 2010–2013	Succeeded by Michael Mancuso
