= Bonanno crime family =

New York-based organized crime group

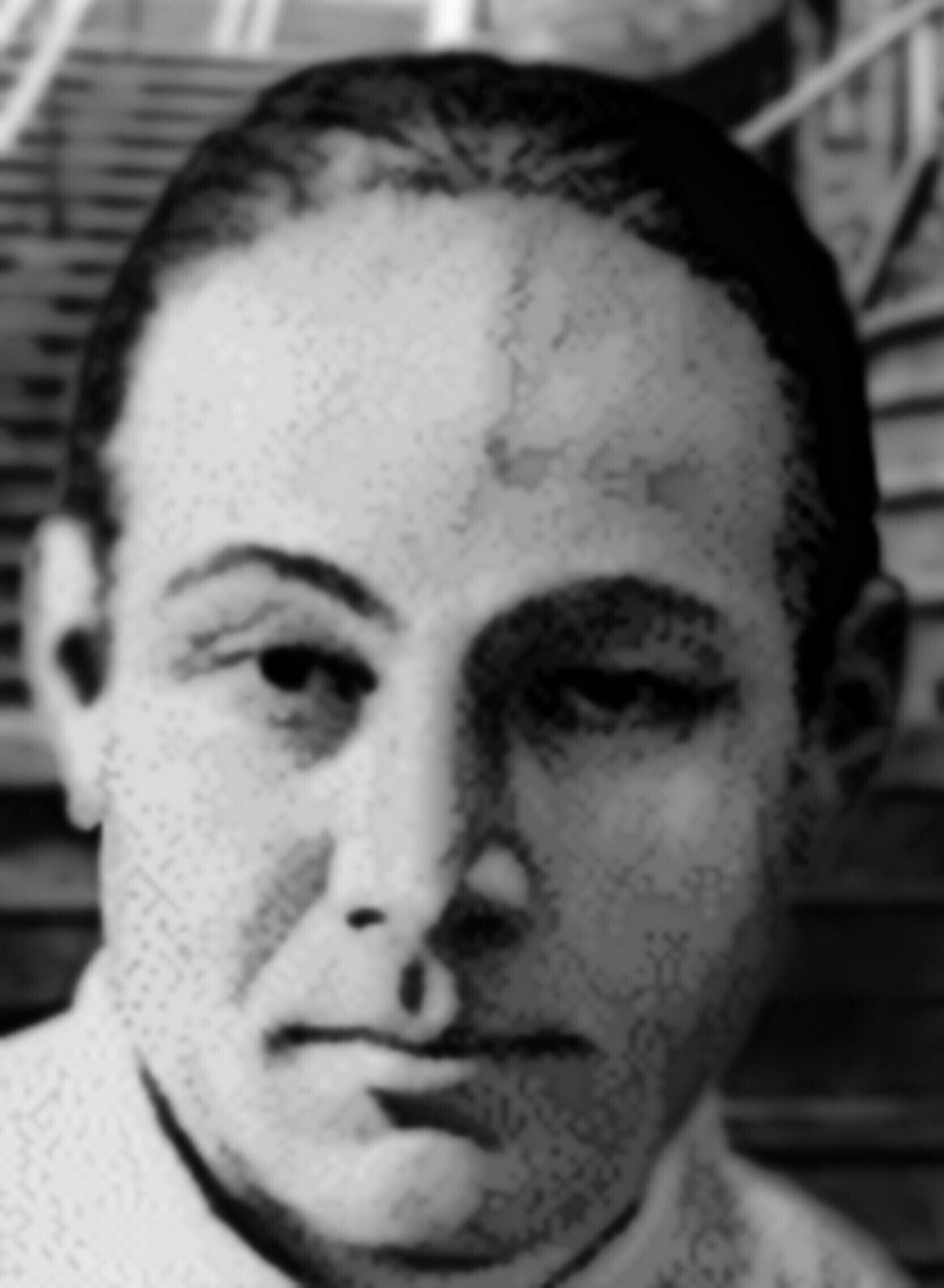
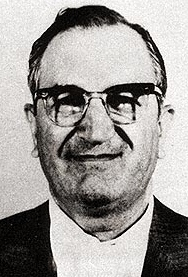
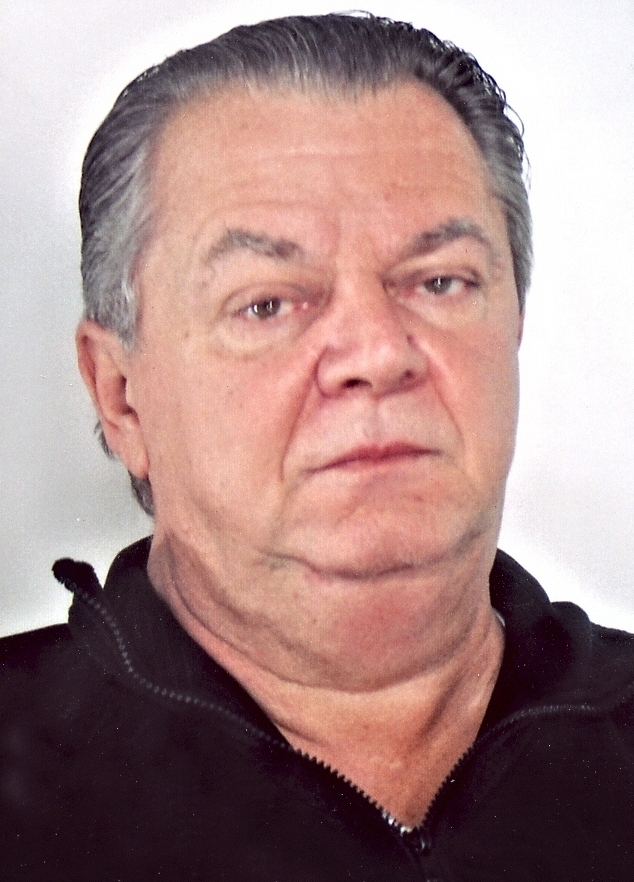
- Salvatore Maranzano Joseph Bonanno Joseph Massino
- Founded: c. 1890s; 135 years ago
- Founder: Salvatore Maranzano
- Named after: Joseph Bonanno
- Founding location: New York City, New York, United States
- Years active: c. 1890s–present
- Territory: Primarily the New York metropolitan area, including Long Island, Westchester County and New Jersey, with additional territory in Rochester and Montreal, as well as Las Vegas, Northern California, South Florida, Tucson and Castellammare del Golfo
- Ethnicity: Italians as "made men" and other ethnicities as associates
- Membership (est.): 250 made members (1973); 195 made members and 500 associates (1986); 130–145 made members (2005); 130 made members (2021)
- Activities: Racketeering, gambling, loansharking, extortion, labor union corruption, drug trafficking, truck hijacking, fencing, fraud, money laundering, prostitution, pornography, assault, and murder
- Allies: Buffalo crime family; Castellammarese Mafia clan; Chicago Outfit; Colombo crime family; Cotroni crime family; DeCavalcante crime family; Gambino crime family; Genovese crime family; Lucchese crime family; Patriarca crime family; Milwaukee crime family; Rizzuto crime family (formerly); Rochester crime family; San Francisco crime family; San Jose crime family; Trafficante crime family; Purple Gang
- Rivals: Rizzuto crime family; and various gangs in New York City, including their allies

The Bonanno crime family (Italian: [boˈnanno]) is an Italian American Mafia crime family and one of the "Five Families" that dominate organized crime activities in New York City within the criminal organization known as the American Mafia. The family's operations have also extended into New Jersey, Florida, California, Arizona, and Montreal. The Bonanno family has historically been one of the smallest of the Five Families, and was seen as the most brutal of the New York families during the 20th century.

The family was known as the Maranzano crime family until its founder Salvatore Maranzano was murdered in 1931. Joseph Bonanno was awarded most of Maranzano's operations when Charles "Lucky" Luciano oversaw the creation of the Commission to divide up criminal enterprises in New York City among the Five Families following the Castellammarese War. Under the leadership of Bonanno between the 1930s and 1960s, the family was one of the most powerful in the United States. By the 1960s, the Bonanno family held significant interests in the Fulton Fish Market, the Garment District, and Kennedy International Airport. Additionally, the family maintained close ties to the Sicilian Mafia, with whom it orchestrated the importation of billions of dollars' worth of heroin into the United States during the mid-to-late 20th century.

However, in the early 1960s, Bonanno attempted to overthrow several leaders of the Commission, but failed. Bonanno disappeared from 1964 to 1966, triggering an intra-family war colloquially referred to as the "Banana War" that lasted until 1968, when Bonanno was forced into exile by the Commission and subsequently retired to Arizona. Carmine Galante, a former top lieutenant of Bonanno, took control of the family in the mid-1970s. After challenging the Gambino family for control of New York's drug trade, Galante was killed in 1979 in a Commission-approved assassination. During the 1980s, Philip Rastelli headed the organization and put down an insurrection by a competing faction within the family by ordering the massacre of three rival capos—Philip Giaccone, Al Indelicato and Dominick Trinchera—in 1981.

Between 1976 and 1981, the family was infiltrated by Federal Bureau of Investigation (FBI) agent Joseph Pistone, who went undercover using the alias "Donnie Brasco". This resulted in the Bonannos becoming the first of the New York families to be expelled from the Commission. Consequently, the Bonnano family was the smallest and weakest of the Five Families during the 1980s. It took until the 1990s for the family to recover, a process overseen by Joseph Massino, who became the new boss upon the death of Rastelli in 1991. Despite these issues, by the dawn of the new millennium, the Bonanno family had not only regained their seat on the Commission but had also become the second-most-powerful family in New York after the Genovese family. However, a rash of convictions during the early 2000s culminated in Massino himself becoming a government witness in 2004, the first boss of one of the Five Families in New York City to turn state's evidence.

== History ==
=== Sicilian origins ===
The origins of the Bonanno crime family can be traced back to the town of Castellammare del Golfo located in the Province of Trapani, Sicily, their boss Giuseppe "Peppe" Bonanno, and his older brother and advisor, Stefano. The clan's strongest ally was the leader of the Magaddino clan Stefano Magaddino, the nephew of Joseph Bonanno's maternal grandmother. During the 1900s, the two clans feuded with Felice Buccellato, the boss of the Buccellato clan.

In 1902, Magaddino arrived in New York and became a powerful member of the Castellammarese clan. After the murders of Stefano and Giuseppe Bonanno, their younger brother, Salvatore, took revenge by killing members of the Buccellatos.

In 1903, Salvatore Bonanno married Catherine Bonventre and on January 18, 1905, she gave birth to Joseph Bonanno. Three years later Salvatore moved his family to New York City, and began establishing dominance and control in the Castellammarese community of Williamsburg, Brooklyn. While operating in Brooklyn, the Castellammarese leaders were able to secure the criminal organization's future.

In 1911, Salvatore returned to Sicily, where he died of a heart attack in 1915. In 1921, Magaddino fled to Buffalo, New York to avoid murder charges and the Castellammarese clan was taken over by Nicolo "Cola" Schirò.

=== Castellammarese War ===
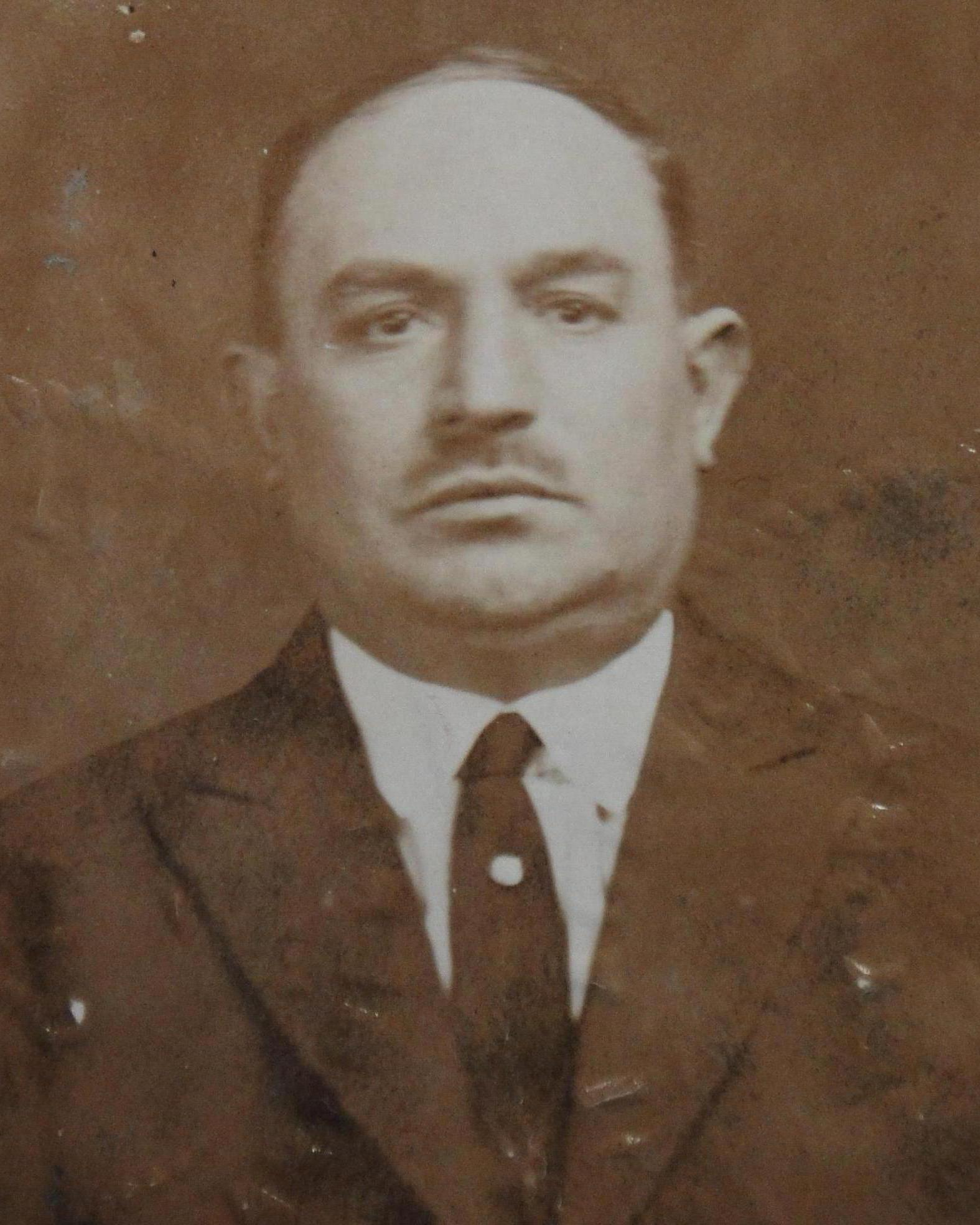
"Cola" Schirò in 1923

In 1930, violence broke out between a faction led by Giuseppe "Joe the Boss" Masseria and members of the Castellammareses over the theft of Masseria's bootleg liquor. This soon developed into a full out war known as the Castellammarese War. At the time, the Castellammareses were led by Nicolo "Cola" Schirò, who tried to work with Masseria. Schirò was replaced by Salvatore Maranzano, who wanted to take control over New York's underworld. Under Maranzano's leadership, the bloodshed continued.

The Castellammarese faction was more organized and unified than the Masseria clan. Maranzano's allies were Buffalo family boss Stefano Magaddino, Detroit family boss Gaspar Milazzo and Philadelphia family boss Salvatore Sabella, all Castellammarese. The family included mobsters Joseph Bonanno, Carmine Galante, and Gaspar DiGregorio. Maranzano was also close to Joseph Profaci, future boss of the New York Profaci family. Finally, they established a secret alliance with the Bronx Reina family boss Gaetano Reina, a nominal Masseria ally.

After Reina's murder on February 26, 1930, members of the Masseria faction began to defect to Maranzano. By 1931, momentum had shifted to the Castellammarese faction. That spring, a group of younger Mafiosi from both camps, known as the "Young Turks", decided to switch to Maranzano and end the war. This group included future mob bosses Charles "Lucky" Luciano, Vito Genovese, Frank Costello, Tommy Lucchese, Albert Anastasia and Joe Adonis. As leader of the Young Turks, Luciano concluded a secret deal with Maranzano and promised to kill Masseria. The war finally came to end when Masseria was killed on April 15, 1931.

=== Maranzano's murder and the Commission ===
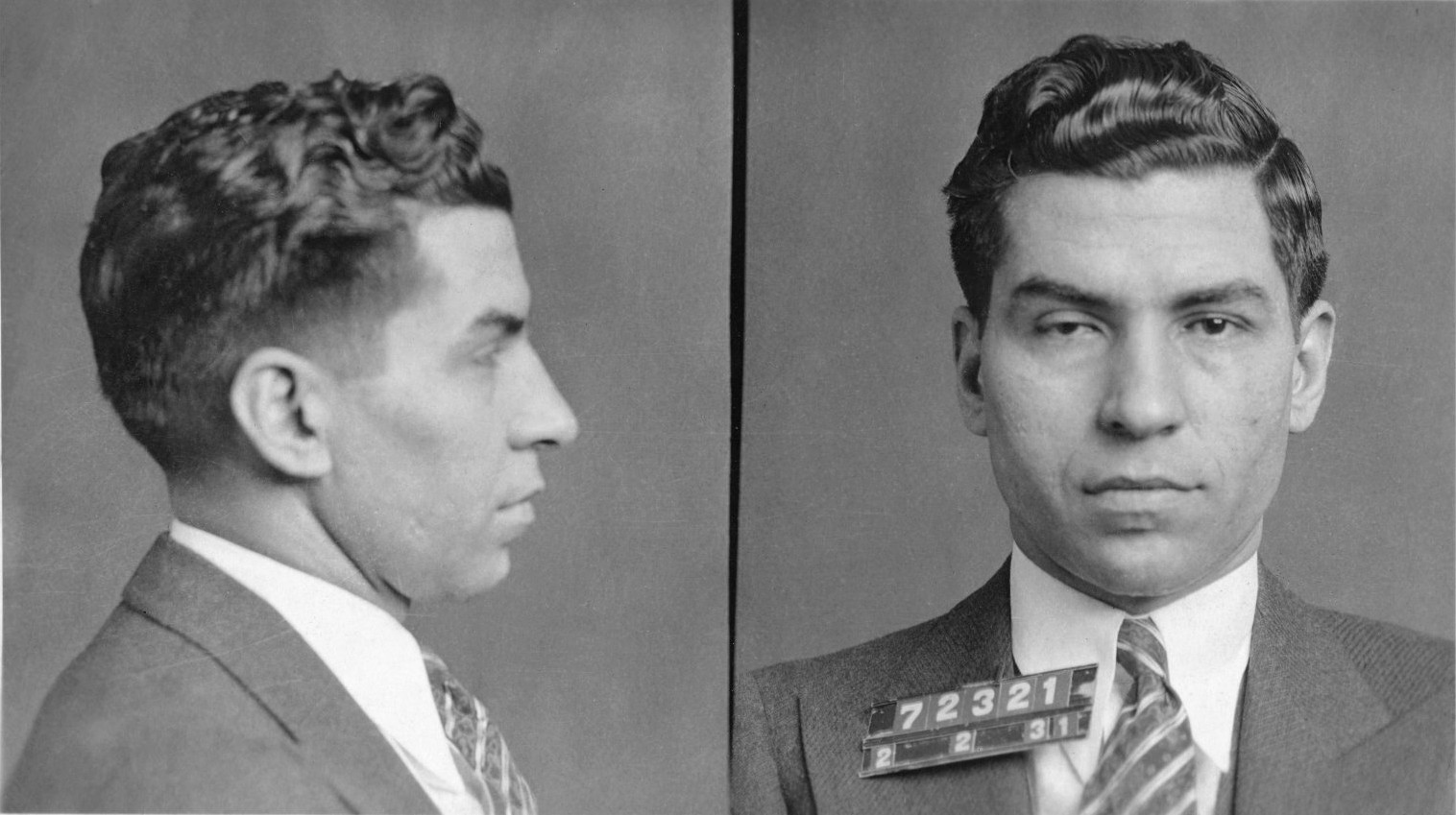
Lucky Luciano seized control of the Commission after murdering Salvatore Maranzano.

After Masseria's death, Maranzano outlined a peace plan to all the Sicilian and Italian Mafia leaders in the United States. There would be 24 organizations (to be known as "families") throughout the United States, each of which would choose its own boss. In New York City, Maranzano established five Cosa Nostra families: the Luciano family under Lucky Luciano, the Mangano family under Vincent Mangano, the Gagliano family under Tommy Gagliano, the Profaci family under Joseph Profaci, and the Maranzano crime family under himself. Maranzano created an additional post for himself, that of capo di tutti capi, or boss of bosses.

Although Maranzano was more forward-looking than Masseria, at core he was still a "Mustache Pete". It did not take long for Maranzano and Luciano to come into conflict: Luciano was not pleased that Maranzano had reneged on his promise of equality, and soon came to believe he was even more hidebound and greedy than Masseria had been. At the same time, Maranzano had grown uncomfortable with Luciano's ambitions and growing power and secretly plotted to have him killed. When Tommy Lucchese alerted Luciano that he and Vito Genovese had been marked for death, Luciano felt he had to strike first.

On September 10, 1931, gangsters hired by Luciano, who were not known to Maranzano or his men, murdered Maranzano in his office. Luciano had become the dominant crime boss in America and replaced the "boss of bosses" title with The Commission to regulate the Mafia's national affairs and mediate disputes between families. He also awarded Joseph Bonanno leadership of the Maranzano family.

=== The Bonanno era ===
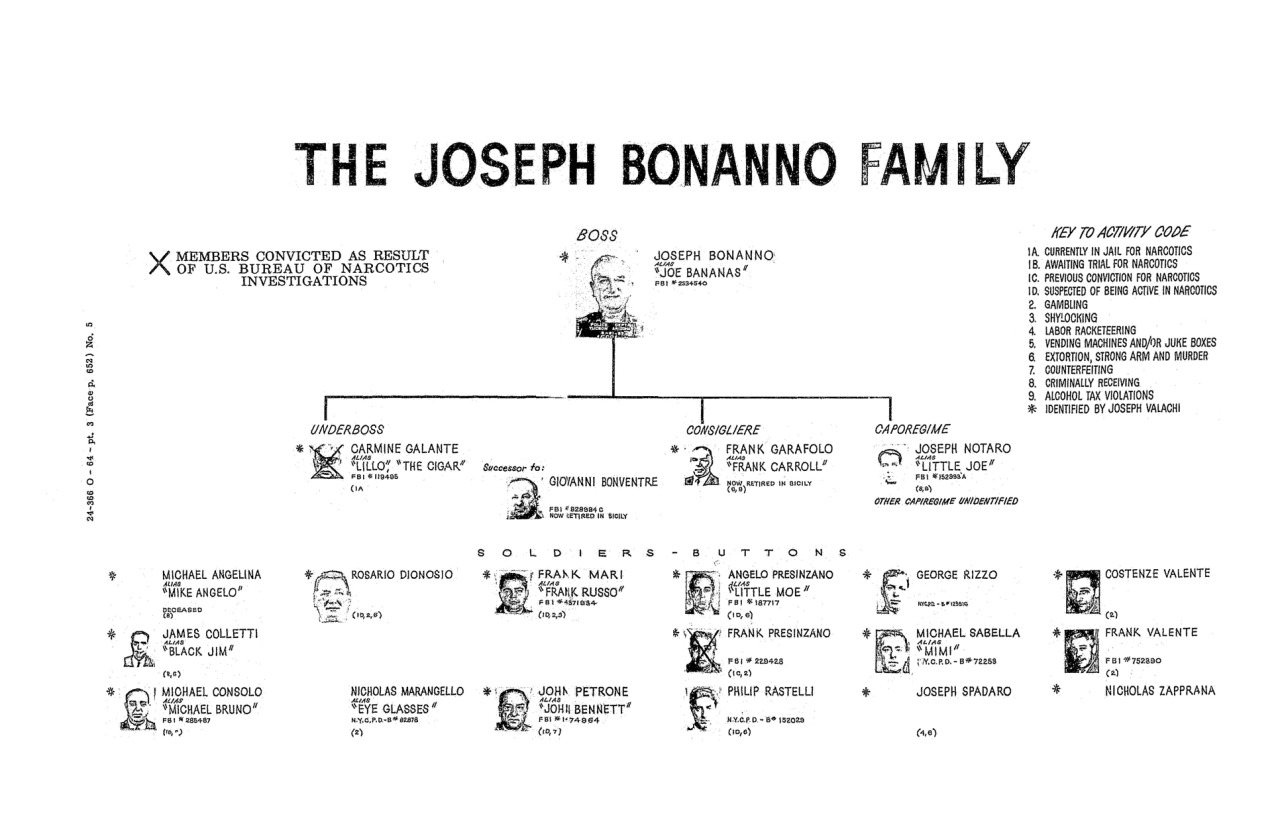
An FBI chart of the Bonanno family hierarchy in 1963

After Maranzano's death, Joseph Bonanno was awarded most of Maranzano's operations. At 26 years old, Bonanno was the youngest Mafia leader in the nation.

Years later, Bonanno claimed not to have known about the plot to eliminate Maranzano, and only learned later that Maranzano had planned to kill Luciano due to a falling-out over influence in the Garment District. By Bonanno's account, he believed a renewed war with Luciano would serve no purpose, since Luciano only wanted to run his own rackets. However, mob expert Anthony Bruno has argued that it was very unlikely that Luciano would have allowed him to live had he still backed Maranzano.

Bonanno directed his family into illegal gambling, loansharking, and narcotics. The family also built significant criminal interests in California and Arizona. With the support of Buffalo crime family boss Stefano Magaddino, Bonanno also expanded into Canada.

Like Maranzano before him, Bonanno embraced the Old World Mafia traditions of "honor", "tradition", "respect" and "dignity" as principles for ruling his family. He was more steeped in these traditions than other mobsters of his generation. For instance, he considered himself the "Father" of his family, as Maranzano had before him. The Bonanno family was considered the closest knit of the Five Families because Joseph tried to restrict membership to Castellammarese Sicilians. He strongly believed that blood relations and a strict Sicilian upbringing were the only way to uphold the traditional values of the Mafia.

Over the years, Joseph became a powerful member of the Commission, owing to his close relationship with fellow boss Joe Profaci. The bond between the two became even stronger when Joseph's son Salvatore "Bill" Bonanno married Profaci's niece Rosalie in 1956. The Bonanno-Profaci alliance deterred the other three families from trying to move in on their rackets.

The stable power relationship between the families collapsed with the death of Profaci in 1962. Joseph Bonanno was now threatened by an alliance of Tommy Lucchese and new boss Carlo Gambino, and rising discontent within his own family. Many of the family members had begun to complain that Joseph spent too much time at his second home in Tucson, Arizona.

In 1963, Bonanno made plans to assassinate several rivals on the Commission—bosses Tommy Lucchese, Carlo Gambino, and Stefano Magaddino, as well as Frank DeSimone. Bonanno sought and got the support of Profaci's successor, Joseph Magliocco. Not only was Magliocco bitter at being denied a seat on the Commission, but Bonanno and Profaci had been close allies for over 30 years prior to Profaci's death. Bonanno's audacious goal was to take over the Commission and make Magliocco his right-hand man.

Magliocco was assigned the task of killing Lucchese and Gambino and gave the contract to one of his top hit men, Joseph Colombo. However, the opportunistic Colombo revealed the plot to its targets. The other bosses quickly realized that Magliocco could not have planned this himself. Knowing how close Bonanno was with Magliocco (and before him, Profaci), as well as their close ties through marriages, the other bosses concluded Bonanno was the real mastermind.

The Commission summoned Bonanno and Magliocco to explain themselves. Fearing for his life, Bonanno went into hiding in Montreal, leaving Magliocco to deal with the Commission. Badly shaken and in failing health, Magliocco confessed his role in the plot. The Commission spared Magliocco's life, but forced him to retire as Profaci family boss and pay a $50,000 fine. As a reward for turning on his boss, Colombo was awarded the Profaci family.

In October 1964, Bonanno returned to Manhattan, but on October 21, 1964, the day he was scheduled to testify before a grand jury, Bonanno was allegedly kidnapped by Magaddino's men as he entered the apartment house on Park Avenue and East 36th Street where one of his lawyers lived. FBI recordings of New Jersey boss Sam "the Plumber" Decavalcante revealed that the other bosses were taken by surprise when Bonanno disappeared, and other FBI recordings captured angry Bonanno soldiers saying, "That son-of-a-bitch took off and left us here alone."

=== The "Banana War" ===
During Joe Bonanno's two-year absence, Gaspar DiGregorio took advantage of family discontent over Bill Bonanno's role to claim family leadership. The Mafia Commission named DiGregorio as Bonanno family boss, and the DiGregorio revolt led to four years of strife in the Bonanno family, labeled by the media as the "Banana War". This led to a divide in the family between loyalists to Bill Bonanno and loyalists to DiGregorio.

The first killing in the war took place on October 21, 1964, when Carlo Simari, a family soldier loyal to Bonanno, was shot dead outside his Brooklyn home. On February 10, 1965, DiGregorio faction soldier Joe Badalamonte was shot to death in Bay Ridge, Brooklyn. Bill Bonanno and Bonanno faction underboss John "Johnny Burns" Morales, street boss Frank "Frankie Lane" LaBruzzo and capo Joseph "Little Joe" Notaro were fired upon while traveling to a meeting in Manhattan on March 15, 1965.

In early 1966, DiGregorio allegedly contacted Bill Bonanno about having a supposed peace meeting. Bonanno agreed and suggested his grand-uncle's house on Troutman Street in Bushwick, Brooklyn as a meeting site. On January 28, 1966, as Bonanno and his loyalists approached the house, they were met with gunfire. No one was wounded during this confrontation.

On April 24, 1966, Notaro's house in the Bronx was firebombed. Notaro died from a heart attack later that year. On July 13, 1966, Frank "Frankie T" Mari, a top enforcer for the DiGregorio faction, was wounded in a gunfight in Bay Ridge.

Joe Bonanno reappeared on May 17, 1966, at Foley Square. In 1968, DiGregorio was wounded by machine gun fire and later suffered a heart attack. The Commission eventually became dissatisfied with DiGregorio's efforts at quelling the family rebellion, dropped DiGregorio, and swung their support to Paul Sciacca. In 1968, after a heart attack, Joe Bonanno ended the family warfare by agreeing to retire as boss and move to Arizona. As part of this peace agreement, Bill also resigned as consigliere and moved out of New York with his father.

=== Rastelli regime ===
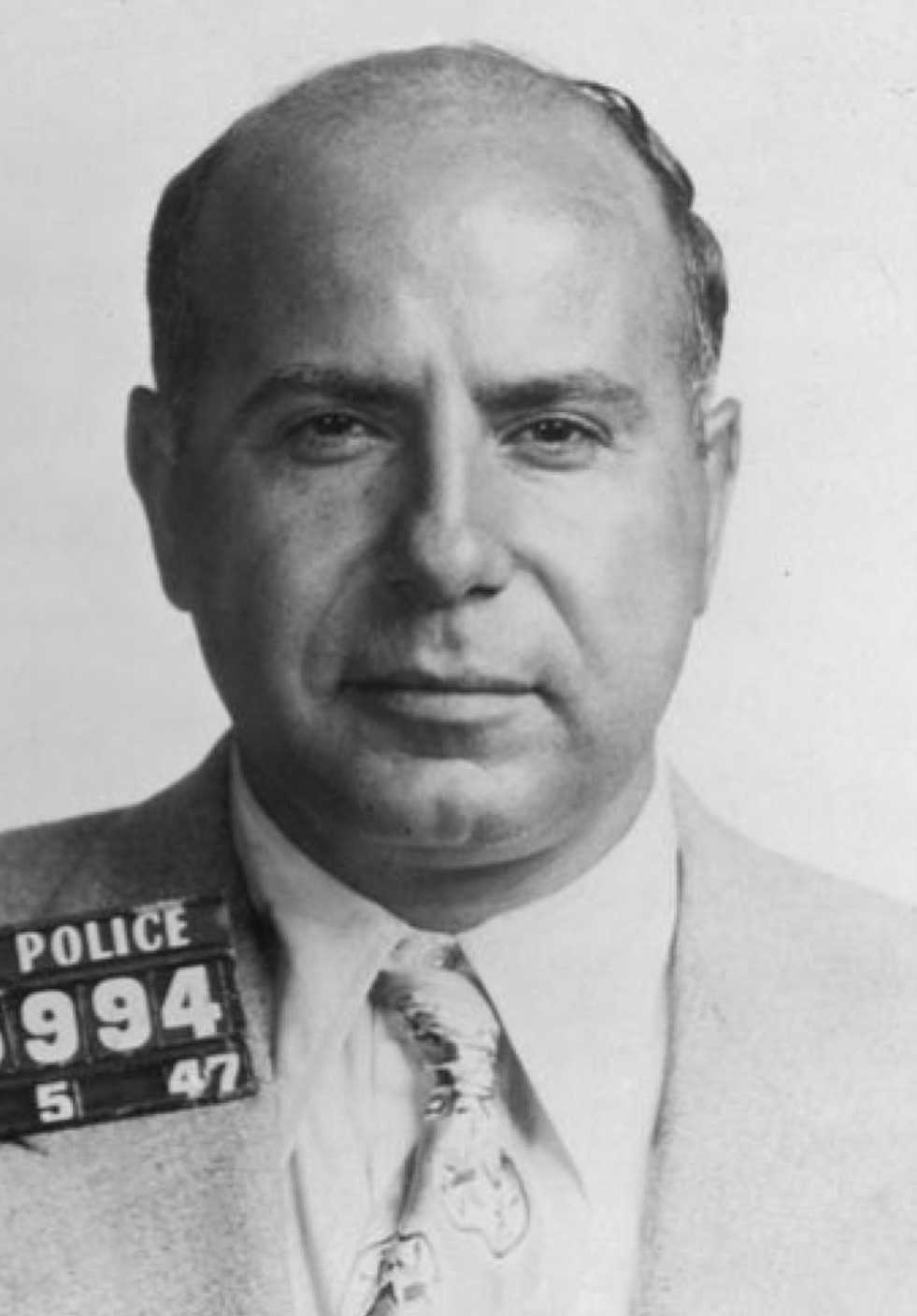
A mugshot of Carmine Galante in 1947

Sciacca only held the position of boss for a few years, giving way to Natale "Joe Diamonds" Evola, a Bonanno loyalist, in 1971. Evola's leadership was also short-lived, and his death in 1973, from natural causes, brought Philip "Rusty" Rastelli to the head position. On February 23, 1974, at a meeting at the Americana Hotel in Manhattan, the Commission named Rastelli as boss.

On March 6, 1975, Rastelli was indicted on racketeering charges involving extortion. Nine years earlier, Rastelli had established a trade association of lunch wagon operators and taken control of the industry. Any operator who refused to join the Association and pay its stiff fees faced vandalism and physical assault. On April 23, 1976, Rastelli was convicted of extortion in United States District Court for the Eastern District of New York. On August 27, 1976, Rastelli was sentenced to 10 years in prison, to be served consecutively after a four-year state sentence for conspiracy, criminal contempt of court, and usury.

In Rastelli's absence, Galante seized control of the Bonannos as unofficial acting boss. The New York crime families were alarmed at Galante's brazen attempt at taking over the narcotics market. Genovese crime family boss Frank Tieri began contacting Cosa Nostra leaders to build a consensus for Galante's murder, even obtaining approval from the retired Joseph Bonanno.

In 1979, they received a boost when Rastelli and Joseph Massino sought Commission approval to kill Galante; the request was granted. On July 12, 1979, Galante was shot dead by three men at a restaurant in the Bushwick area of Brooklyn.

=== Donnie Brasco and the three capos murder ===
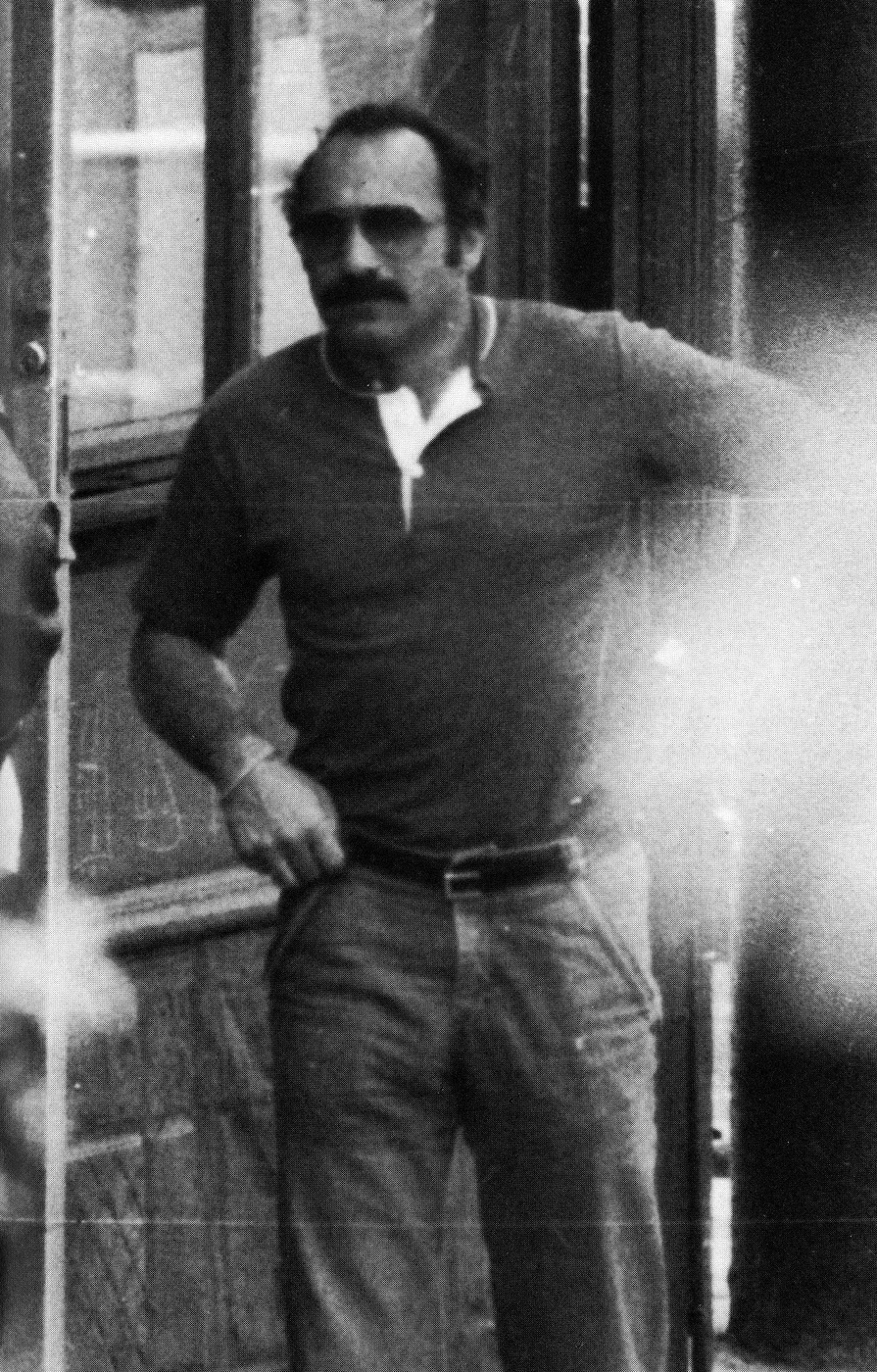
Joseph D. Pistone, alias "Donnie Brasco"

Joseph Pistone, alias Donnie Brasco, was an undercover FBI agent tasked with infiltrating the Bonanno family. After months of planning, in September 1976, Pistone started his undercover operation—an operation that was initially intended to last for around six months, but which turned into several years.

Pistone first spent six months in the Colombo family before he shifted to the Bonanno family by developing a relationship with Anthony Mirra. When Mirra was sent to prison, Pistone was tutored in the ways of the Mafia by Bonanno soldier Benjamin "Lefty" Ruggiero, whose captain was Mike "Mimi" Sabella. After the murder of Galante, Pistone reported to captain Dominick "Sonny Black" Napolitano.

Following the Galante hit, Massino began jockeying for power with Napolitano. Both men were themselves threatened by another faction seeking to depose the absentee boss led by capos Alphonse "Sonny Red" Indelicato, Dominick "Big Trin" Trinchera and Philip Giaccone. The Commission initially tried to maintain neutrality, but in 1981, Massino got word from his informants that the three capos were stocking up on automatic weapons and planning to kill the Rastelli loyalists within the Bonanno family to take complete control. Massino turned to Colombo crime family boss Carmine Persico and Gambino boss Paul Castellano for advice; they told him to act immediately.

Massino, Napolitano and Gerlando Sciascia, a Sicilian-born capo linked to the Montreal Rizzuto crime family, arranged a meeting at a Brooklyn social club with the three capos for May 5, 1981. They had four gunmen, including Vitale and Bonanno-affiliated Montreal boss Vito Rizzuto, hiding in a closet to ambush them. When Trinchera, Giaccone and Indelicato arrived with Frank "Curly" Lino to meet Massino, they were shot to death, with Massino himself stopping Indelicato from escaping. Lino escaped unscathed by running out the door. The hit further improved Massino's prestige, but was marred by both Lino's escape and the discovery of Indelicato's body on May 28.

Massino quickly won Lino over to his side, but Indelicato's son, Anthony "Bruno" Indelicato, vowed revenge. Napolitano assigned the associate he knew as Donnie Brasco, whom he hoped to make a made man, to kill Indelicato. However, Brasco's operation was ended on July 26, 1981. Pistone's undercover work led to over 200 indictments and over 100 convictions of Mafia members.

On August 17, 1981, Napolitano was shot and killed in a basement by Ronald Filocomo and Lino as punishment for admitting Pistone into his crew. On August 29, 1981, the FBI intercepted and arrested Ruggiero. Ruggiero received 15 years under the RICO act. In February 1982, Anthony Mirra, the man who had brought Pistone to the family, was also killed.

In 1985, Rastelli was indicted along with other Cosa Nostra leaders in the Mafia Commission Trial; however, when Rastelli was indicted on separate labor racketeering charges, prosecutors decided to remove him from the Commission trial. Having previously lost their seat on the Commission due to the Brasco infiltration, the Bonanno family suffered less exposure than the other families in this case.

=== Under Massino's command ===
Rastelli died on June 24, 1991. Soon afterward, Massino's brother-in-law, Salvatore Vitale, convened a meeting of the family's capos where Massino was acclaimed as boss. Vitale and other capos had pressed Massino to become boss since the late 1980s. Massino was reluctant to take this step as long as Rastelli was alive, citing long-standing Mafia tradition that a boss retains his title until he retires or dies. He designated Vitale as his messenger while he was incarcerated, and ordered Vitale to "make me boss" as soon as Rastelli died.

Massino was 49 years old at the time he formally became boss, and knew he potentially had a long reign ahead of him if he could avoid the pitfalls that landed other bosses in prison. With this in mind, Massino adopted a more secretive way of doing business than had been the case for mafiosi during much of the 20th century. He shut down the family's social clubs, believing they were too easy to bug. He all but ended joint rackets with other families, believing that there was too much risk in depending on other families.

He streamlined the family's chain of command, assigning a group of capos to oversee a particular enterprise and report to Vitale, whom he named underboss. When Massino was granted supervised release in 1992, he retained Vitale as his messenger until 1995, since Massino was not allowed to associate with known mafiosi. Since Vitale had never been convicted of a mob-related crime, the FBI had no reason to be suspicious of the two brothers-in-law meeting together.

Massino was angered by family namesake Bonanno's tell-all book, A Man of Honor, considering it a gross violation of the code of omertà. To that end, he changed the family's name to "the Massino family". At the same time, he barred family members from speaking his name. Instead, they were to point to their ears when referring to him—a nod to how Genovese boss Vincent Gigante told his men to point to their chins rather than use his name. Remembering how close Pistone/Brasco had come to actually being made, Massino required any prospective soldier to be "on record" with a made man for at least eight years before becoming made himself. He also strongly encouraged his men to volunteer their sons for membership, believing that they would be less likely to turn informer and be more loyal.

However, the family already had a reputation for loyalty. It had been the only family in the modern history of the New York Mafia, i. e., since the Castellammarese War, to have never had a made man turn informant or government witness. Massino used this as a point of pride to rally his crime family. Under Massino's leadership, the number of "made" members in the Bonanno family increased from approximately 80 in the early 1990s to around 110 by the end of the decade.

Within a few years, the Bonannos had regained their Commission seat with Gotti's help. By 1998, a rash of convictions in other families left Massino as the only full-fledged New York boss who was not in prison. (Note: The other 4 crime bosses, Carmine Persico(1987), Vic Amuso(1992), John Gotti(1992), and Vincent Gigante(1997) were all in prison by then) The FBI reckoned him as the most powerful boss in the nation. His stature put him in a position to set general policies for the entire New York Mafia. The Bonanno family overtook the Gambino family to become the second-most powerful Mafia family in New York, behind the Genovese family.

=== Downfall and Massino turns state's evidence ===
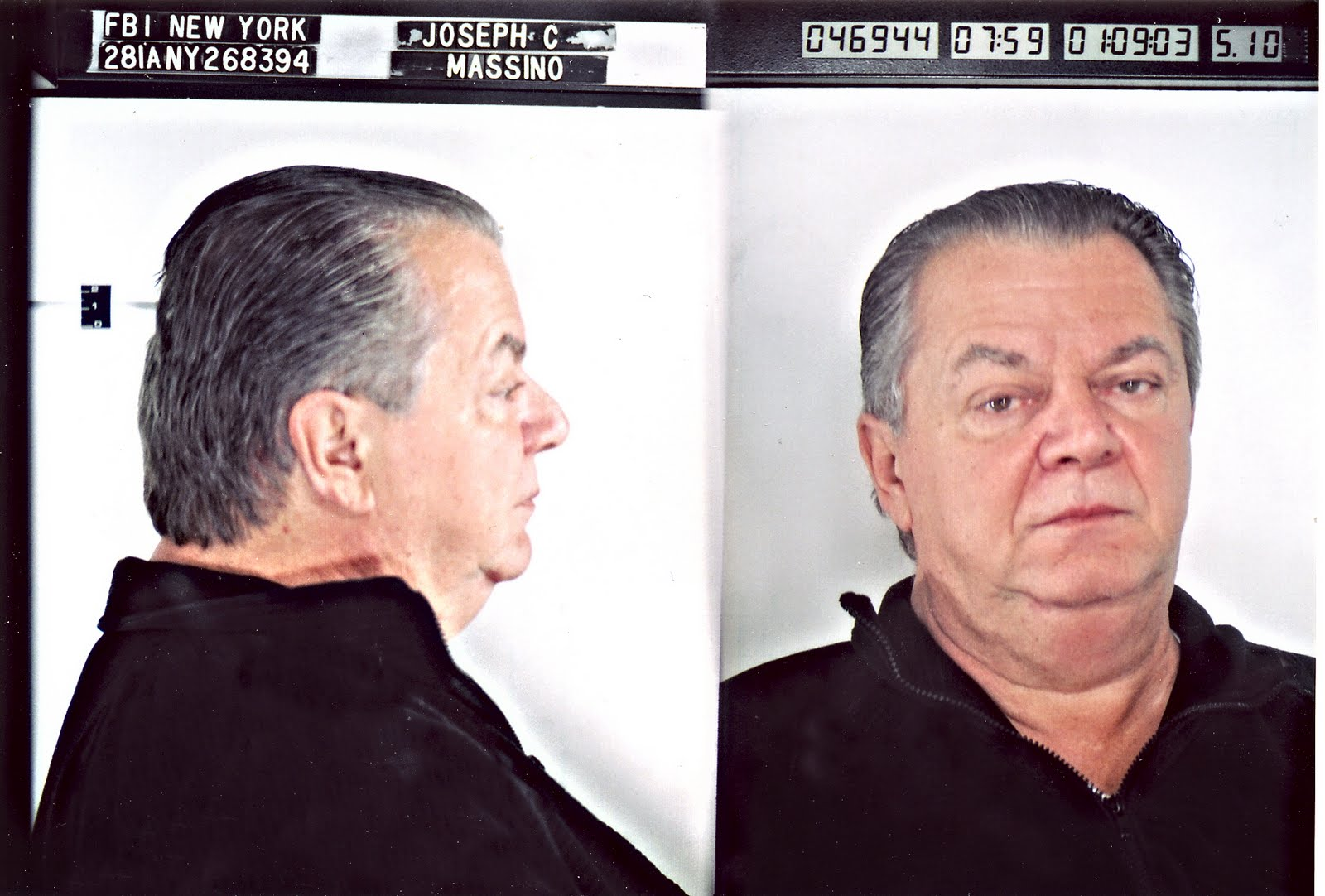
An FBI mugshot of Joseph Massino

The family managed to avoid being ensnared by the FBI until 2000, when a pair of forensic accountants who normally worked on financial fraud cases discovered that Barry Weinberg, a businessman who had partnered with capo Richard Cantarella in several parking lots, had failed to report millions of dollars' worth of income over a decade. Told he faced a long prison term unless he wore a wire and incriminated his Bonanno partners, Weinberg agreed to cooperate. One of Weinberg's other partners, Augustino Scozzari, also agreed to cooperate. Between them, Weinberg and Scozzari captured hundreds of incriminating statements from Cantarella and his crew.

In October 2002, armed with this evidence, the government obtained a 24-count RICO indictment against 21 Bonanno soldiers and associates. The biggest names on the indictment were Cantarella—who was serving as acting underboss while Vitale was awaiting sentencing for loansharking and money laundering—and capo Frank Coppa. Already serving time for fraud, Coppa agreed to turn informer rather than face the prospect of an additional conviction that would effectively send him to prison for life. He was the first made man in the Bonanno family's history to turn informer.

He was followed shortly afterward by acting underboss Cantarella, a participant in the Mirra murder, who was facing racketeering and murder charges and whom Coppa had implicated in the Perrino murder along with Vitale. A third, Joseph D'Amico, subsequently turned state's evidence with the knowledge that Cantarella could implicate him in murder as well. All of these defections left Massino, at last, vulnerable to serious charges.

On January 9, 2003, Massino was arrested and indicted, alongside Vitale, Frank Lino and capo Daniel Mongelli, in a comprehensive racketeering indictment. The charges against Massino himself included ordering the 1981 murder of Napolitano. Massino was denied bail, and Vincent Basciano took over as acting boss in his absence. Massino hired David Breitbart, an attorney he had originally wanted to represent him in his 1987 trial, for his defense.

Three more Bonanno made men would choose to cooperate before Massino came to trial. The first was James Tartaglione; anticipating he would shortly be indicted as well he went to the FBI and agreed to wear a wire while he remained free. The second was Salvatore Vitale. In custody, Massino again put out the word, to a receptive Bonanno family, that he wanted Vitale killed. After learning of Massino's earlier plans to kill his brother-in-law from Coppa and Cantarella, prosecutors informed Vitale. Vitale was already dissatisfied by the lack of support he and his family received from Massino after his arrest.

On the day he was arraigned with Massino, Vitale decided to flip as soon as it was safe to do so. He formally reached a deal with prosecutors in February. He was followed in short order by Lino, knowing Vitale could implicate him in murder as well. Also flipping was longtime Bonanno associate Duane Leisenheimer, concerned for his safety after an investigator for Massino's defense team visited to find out whether he intended to flip.

By the time the trial started, Massino faced 11 RICO counts for seven murders (due to the prospect of prosecutors seeking the death penalty for the Sciascia murder, that case was severed to be tried separately), arson, extortion, loansharking, illegal gambling, and money laundering. By this time, Time magazine had dubbed Massino as "the Last Don", in reference to his status as the only New York boss not serving a prison sentence at that point. The name stuck.

After deliberating for five days, the jury found Massino guilty of all eleven counts on July 30, 2004. His sentencing was initially scheduled for October 12, and he was expected to receive a sentence of life imprisonment with no possibility of parole. The jury also approved the prosecutors' recommended $10 million forfeiture of the proceeds of his reign as Bonanno boss on the day of the verdict.

Immediately after his July 30 conviction, as court was adjourned, Massino requested a meeting with Judge Garaufis, where he made his first offer to cooperate. He did so in hopes of sparing his life, as he was facing the death penalty if found guilty of Gerlando Sciascia's murder. One of John Ashcroft's final acts as Attorney General was to order federal prosecutors to seek the death penalty for Massino. Massino stood to be the first Mafia boss to be executed for his crimes, and the first mob boss to face the death penalty since Lepke Buchalter was executed in 1944.

Massino claimed he decided to turn informer due to the prospect of his wife and mother having to forfeit their houses to the government. Mob authors and journalists Anthony D. DeStefano and Selwyn Raab both consider the turning of so many made men as a factor in disillusioning Massino with Cosa Nostra, the former also assuming Massino had decided to flip "long before the verdict". Massino was the first sitting boss of a New York crime family to turn state's evidence, and the second in the history of the American Mafia to do so Philadelphia crime family boss Ralph Natale had flipped in 1999 when facing drug charges.

=== Basciano and Montagna's leadership ===
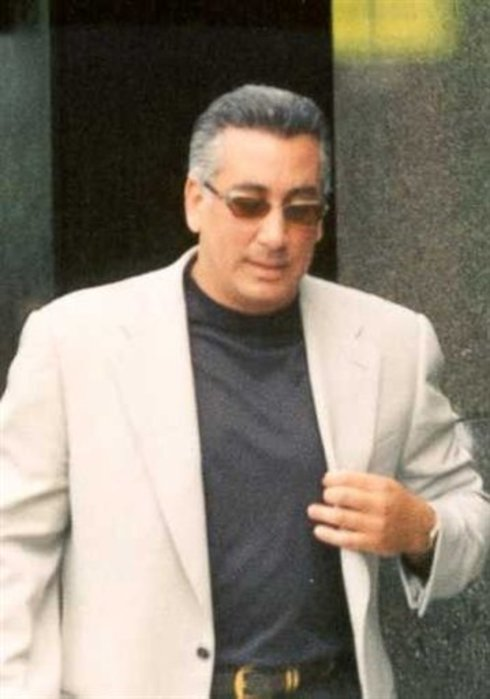
Vincent Basciano

In July 2004, federal prosecutors in Brooklyn claimed to have convicted 75 mobsters or associates of the Bonanno family in the four preceding years. In June 2005, 12 Bonanno family members and associates, seven over the age of 70, including acting consigliere Anthony Rabito, were indicted and arrested on charges of operating a $10 million a year gambling ring."

After the arrest of Massino, Vincent Basciano became acting boss. In 2006, Basciano was convicted in a racketeering trial for attempted murder and running an illegal gambling operation. Due to a hung jury, Basciano was not convicted of the 2001 murder of Frank Santoro.

After Basciano's first murder trial, prosecutors retried him on those counts on which the jury hung in the first trial. On August 1, 2007, Basciano was convicted of murdering Santoro, who tried to kidnap Basciano's son, and was sentenced to life imprisonment. He named Brooklyn business owner Salvatore "Sal the Ironworker" Montagna as his "acting boss" during his trials. Montagna was closely associated with the Bonanno Sicilian faction, including Baldo Amato and capo Cesare Bonventre. Nicholas "Nicky Mouth" Santora served as "acting underboss" and Anthony Rabito as the alleged consigliere.

On February 6, 2007, acting underboss Nicholas Santora, acting consigliere Anthony Rabito, captains or former captains Jerome Asaro, Joseph Cammarano Jr. and Louis Decicco were indicted on racketeering charges.

Following the deportation of Montagna to Canada in 2009, he was succeeded by Vincent Badalamenti as Bonanno family acting boss.

=== Mancuso and acting boss Cammarano Jr. ===
In 2013, Michael Mancuso was named the new official boss of the Bonanno family, while serving time in prison. Mancuso's underboss Thomas DiFiore took over as acting boss in his absence, and was replaced by Joseph Cammarano Jr. in 2014 following DiFiore's arrest, guilty plea and 21-month prison sentence. In December 2016, the FBI observed over a dozen ranking members of the family host a dinner together in recognition of Cammarano Jr.'s new position.

Bonanno associate, Charles "Charlie Pepsi" Centaro, was sentenced to 33 months in prison on September 15, 2015, after being convicted of money laundering. It was alleged that he had laundered over $500,000. Centaro, along with Bonanno/Gambino associate Franco Lupoi were involved in a large cocaine, heroin and weapons trafficking operation that stretched from New York to Italy. The Gambino crime family from New York and the 'Ndrangheta Mafia from Calabria were also involved.

On August 4, 2016, United States Attorney of New York charged 46 Mafia leaders with racketeering conspiracy, arson, illegal trafficking in firearms and conspiracy to commit assault throughout the East Coast of the United States from Springfield, Massachusetts to Southern Florida. The 46 defendants were leaders, members, and associates of the Genovese, Gambino, Luchese, Bonanno, and Philadelphia crime families. Members of the Bonanno family charged were soldiers Pasquale Maiorino and John Spirito.

In November 2017, the FBI arrested several individuals in New York City, including members and associates of the Bonanno and Gambino crime families, on charges of narcotics trafficking, loansharking and firearms offenses. They included Damiano Zummo, a reputed acting captain in the Bonanno crime family. In November 2015, Zummo was involved in the induction ceremony of an undercover police agent, which was secretly recorded, in Canada. Zummo played a major role in the ceremony and named others at a higher level in the organization on the recording. A Brooklyn court official later said, "The recording of a secret induction ceremony is an extraordinary achievement for law enforcement and deals a significant blow to La Cosa Nostra." The recording also led to the arrest of 13 mobsters.

On January 12, 2018, eight members of the Bonanno family were arrested and charged with racketeering, extortion and related offenses. Street boss Joseph Cammarano Jr. and consigliere John "Porky" Zancocchio were included. Genovese and Lucchese crime family members Ernest Montevecchi and Eugene "Boopsie" Castelle were also arrested. The charges were assault and aid resulting in serious bodily injury, extortion, loansharking, wire and mail fraud, narcotics distribution, conspiracy to commit murder, extortion conspiracy, racketeering and racketeering conspiracy. Joseph "Joe Valet" Sabella was identified as a captain and George Tropiano as an acting capo. Made members Domenick Miniero, Albert "Al Muscles" Armetta and Joseph "Joey Blue Eyes" Santapaolo were charged with RICO and extortion conspiracy, Armetta was accused of assaulting a person on Halloween in 2015.

On August 15, 2018, Judge Dora Irizarry sentenced Ronald Giallanzo, nephew of Vincent Asaro and former Bonanno acting captain, to 14 years' imprisonment. Giallanzo was previously arrested in March 2017 alongside Bonanno soldiers Michael Palmaccio and Nicholas Festa. Festa and Palmaccio admitted to the extortion of seven individuals and each paid $500,000 in forfeiture. Giallanzo was accused of operating a loansharking and illegal gambling business from 1998 to 2017. He agreed to pay $1.25 million in forfeiture and to sell his five-bedroom mansion in Howard Beach, Queens, which was constructed using the criminal proceeds of his loansharking business. He was ordered to pay $268,000 in restitution to his victims and admitted to his participation in extending and collecting extortionate loans from five individuals.

In October 2018, Sylvester Zottola ("Sally Daz"), age 71, an associate of the Bonanno family, was fatally shot at a McDonald's on Webster Avenue in the Bronx; authorities described the killing as a Mafia-style assassination. The killing occurred after several attacks targeting Zottola, and his son, Salvatore Zottola, over the preceding months. According to the court records, the elder Zottola had been a close associate of Vincent Basciano. In October 2018, federal prosecutors indicted Bushawn Shelton, allegedly a high-ranking member of the Bloods gang, with attempting to hire a hitman to kill Sylvester and Salvatore Zottola.

In June 2019, federal prosecutors issued a superseding indictment, charging Anthony Zottola Sr. (the son of Sylvester Zottola and brother of Salvatore Zottola), Shelton, and six others with a murder-for-hire conspiracy and related charges. The charging document alleged that Anthony Zottola Sr. hired Shelton to arrange the hit, and that "Shelton in turn outsourced the job to several other members of the Bloods." The case is awaiting trial, with federal authorities possibly pursuing the death penalty.

On March 13, 2019, Cammarano Jr. and Zancocchio were acquitted of racketeering and conspiracy to commit extortion charges. On May 25, 2019, former family consigliere Anthony Graziano died.

=== Castellammarese connection ===
In 2020, the Italian police together with the FBI discovered a strong link between the Bonannos and the Castellammare del Golfo Mafia family, in particular to Francesco Domingo. During the investigations, several meetings between Domingo and members of the Bonanno family were monitored. According to the reports, the Sicilian boss is considered the point of reference to the Bonannos' affiliates in Sicily. Most of the summits and meetings were held at Domingo's house in the Gagliardetta district, in Castellammare del Golfo.

=== Current position of the family ===
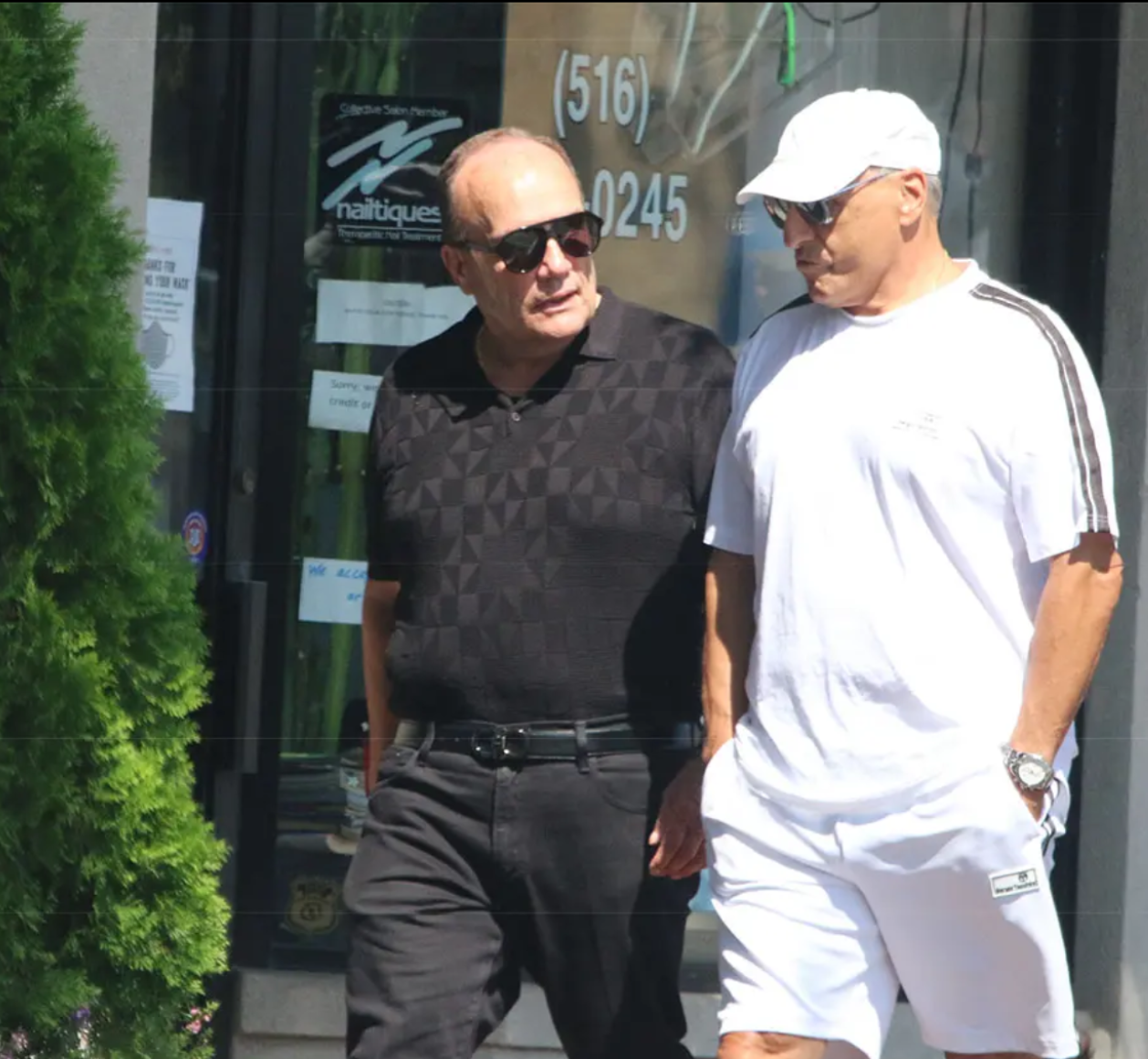
An FBI surveillance photo of Michael Mancuso (right) and Johnny Spirito (left)

As of 2022, Michael Mancuso remains the official boss of the Bonanno family. On March 9, 2022, boss Michael Mancuso was arrested and is under investigation for violating the terms of his supervised release by associating with members of organized crime.

Vito Grimaldi, a former capo in the family and Joseph Cammarano Jr.'s father-in-law, died on July 15, 2022. Mancuso ordered Cammarano Jr. not to attend Grimaldi's wake on July 19, 2022, but he disobeyed Mancuso and went to the Glen Cove funeral home where the wake was being held anyway. There, some Bonanno mobsters confronted Cammarano Jr. as he approached Grimaldi's casket and assaulted him, knocking him to the ground, but he and his brother Dino, also present, were protected by a multitude of bikers from the Crazy Pistons Motorcycle Club in Brooklyn, who, along with the Cammaranos, got into a confrontation with the other mobsters.

After the scuffle ended, Bonanno family capos Ernest "Ernie" Aiello and John "Johnny Mulberry" Sciremammano, as well as soldier John "Johnny Joe" Spirito Jr., were left bloodied and battered on the floor. When questioned about the incident, Mancuso's attorney Stacey Richman said "I categorically deny the allegation" with regards to Mancuso having ordered the assault on Cammarano Jr. A law enforcement source stated "It's hard to predict whether there will be retaliation, a violent reaction would have been a knee-jerk response a few decades ago, but the mob has stopped whacking people these days, but that is still a fear."

Scott Burnstein reported that Mancuso allegedly ordered hits on the Cammaranos. On December 18, 2022, Cammarano, Jr.'s Long Island home was shot up in a drive by, allegedly ordered by Mancuso who is still upset about the funeral home beatdown. After the Long Island shooting, one of the Cammarano brothers' businesses was vandalized and firebombed. The Cammarano brothers went 'underground' to avoid any assassination attempts.

On August 16, 2022, two indictments out of the Eastern District of New York charged nine members and associates of the Bonanno and Genovese crime families with racketeering, illegal gambling, money laundering conspiracy, obstruction of justice, and other offenses. The Bonanno mobsters indicted included capo Anthony "Little Anthony" Pipitone, soldier Vito Pipitone, who was arrested in Wellington, Florida, and appeared in federal court in Miami, associate Agostino Gabriele, and corrupt Nassau County Police Department detective Hector Rosario.

The indictment alleged the Bonannos and Genoveses operated a joint illegal gambling establishment in Lynbrook called the Gran Caffe. The revenues from that operation were laundered through cash transfers to the defendants and then given to the family leaders. In addition, the two families controlled illegal gambling parlours at several other establishments, with the Bonanno family operating them at La Nazionale Soccer Club, the Glendale Sports Club and the Soccer Club at Rockaway Avenue, Valley Stream. Detective Rosario allegedly accepted bribes by the Bonanno family members in exchange for offering to arrange police raids of competing gambling locations. He was charged with obstructing a grand jury investigation and lying to the FBI, and suspended without pay from the Police Department, and shortly thereafter, fired.

On September 14, 2023, former boss turned informant Joseph Massino died.

On August 26, 2024, former capo turned government informant Frank Coppa died in Sarasota, Florida at the age of 82, while living under an assumed name.

On November 7, 2024, Bonanno member Anthony Frascone was among five Long Island men indicted for their involvement in an illegal gambling operation. Based on a 14-month-long investigation, authorities claim the men operated an online sports betting operation based in Nassau County.

On May 25, 2025, a Bonanno social club was robbed by four masked figures. Family administrators Joe Spirito and Ernie Aiello were both present at the time of the robbery. The robbers allegedly took cash and jewelry valued over $100,000.

== Historical leadership ==
=== Boss (official and acting) ===
- 1890s–1909 – Paolo Orlando
- 1909–1912 – Sebastiano DiGaetano – stepped down
- 1912–1930 – Nicolo Schirò – fled
- 1930–1931 – Salvatore Maranzano – murdered on September 10, 1931
- 1931–1968 – Joseph "Joe Bananas" Bonanno – on October 21, 1964, Bonanno disappeared; forcibly replaced as boss by the commission; crime family split into two factions; in May 1966, Bonanno reappeared; officially retired after heart attack in 1968
  - Disputed 1964–1966 – Gaspar "Gasparino" DiGregorio – installed when Bonanno disappeared and later forcibly replaced by the Commission
  - Acting 1966–1968 – Paul Sciacca – for the DiGregorio faction
- 1968–1971 – Paul Sciacca – stepped down
- 1971–1973 – Natale "Joe Diamonds" Evola – died on August 28, 1973
- 1974–1991 – Phillip "Rusty" Rastelli – imprisoned 1976–1983 and 1987–1991
  - de facto 1976–1979 – Carmine "Lilo" Galante – murdered on July 12, 1979
  - Acting 1979–1983 – Salvatore "Sally Fruits" Farrugia – appointed by the Commission
  - Acting 1987–1991 – Anthony "Old Man" Spero – sentenced to life imprisonment in 2002, died in 2008
- 1991–2004 – Joseph "Big Joey" Massino – imprisoned January 2003, became government informant in October 2004
  - Acting 1991–1993 – Anthony "Old Man" Spero
  - Acting 2003–2004 – Anthony "Tony Green" Urso – imprisoned January 2004
  - Acting 2004 – Vincent "Vinny Gorgeous" Basciano – became official boss
- 2004–2011 – Vincent "Vinny Gorgeous" Basciano – imprisoned November 2004, in July 2007 received a life sentence, stepped down
  - Acting 2004–2006 – Michael "The Nose" Mancuso – imprisoned February 2006
  - Acting 2006–2009 – Salvatore "Sal the Iron Worker" Montagna – deported to Canada in April 2009, shot and killed in November 2011
  - Acting 2010–2012 – Vincent "Vinny T.V." Badalamenti – imprisoned in January 2012
- 2013–present – Michael "The Nose" Mancuso – imprisoned 2013–2019 and 2023–2024
  - Acting 2013–2014 – Thomas "Tommy D" DiFiore – arrested on January 23, 2014
  - Acting 2014–2015 – John "Johnny Skyway" Palazzolo – arrested on March 27, 2015, for violating parole
  - Acting 2015–2019 – Joseph "Joe Saunders" Cammarano Jr. – indicted on January 12, 2018, acquitted March 13, 2019
  - Acting 2025–present – John "Johnny Joe" Spirito, Sr.

=== Street boss ===
The Street boss is responsible for passing on orders to lower ranking members. In some instances a ruling panel (of capos) substituted the Street boss role. The family may choose to assemble a ruling panel of capos if the boss dies, goes to prison, or is incapacitated. During the 1960s family war, a ruling panel of capos controlled the decisionmaking for the family. In some instances, the Acting boss uses a Street boss to divert law enforcement attention.

- 1964–1968 – Frank Labruzzo – led Bonanno faction
- 1964– Ruling panel – Gasparino DiGregorio, Angelo Caruso, Nicolino Alfano, Joseph Notaro, Thomas D'Angelo, Natale Evola, Joseph DeFilippo, Peter Crociata and Paul Sciacca
- 1964–1965 – Ruling panel – Gasparino DiGregorio, Angelo Caruso, and Nicolino Alfano
- 1977 – Ruling panel – Nicholas "Nicky Glasses" Marangello, Mickey Zaffarano and Stefano "Stevie Beefs" Cannone
- 1979–1983 – Salvatore "Toto" Catalano – leader of Sicilian "zip" faction, imprisoned 1987
- 2009–2010 – Ruling panel – Joseph Sammartino Sr. (capo in New Jersey), the other members are unknown
- 2010–2012 – Joseph "Joe Bosch" Bosco – worked with Vincent Badalamenti
- 2012–2013 – Ruling panel – Vincent Asaro, Anthony Rabito, and Thomas DiFiore
- 2014–2015 – John "Johnny Joe" Spirito Jr. – worked with John Palazzolo
- 2019–2022 – John "Johnny Skyway" Palazzolo – stepped down
- 2023–2024 – John "Johnny Joe" Spirito, Sr. – also served as Underboss; stepped down
- 2025–present – Ernest "Ernie" Aiello

=== Underboss (official and acting) ===
- 1915–1921 – Stefano Magaddino – fled to Buffalo
- 1921–1930 – Vito Bonventre – murdered on July 15, 1930
- 1930–1931 – Joseph Bonanno – became boss
- 1931–1932 – Angelo Caruso
- 1932–1955 – Francesco "Frank Caroll" Garofalo
- 1955–1962 – Giovanni Bonventre – fled to Sicily in 1950.
- 1962–1968 – Giovanni "Johnny Morales" Morale
  - Acting 1965–1968 – Pietro "Skinny Pete" Crociata – for the DiGregorio faction
  - Acting 1968 – Frank "Russo" Mari – for the DiGregorio faction, murdered
- 1968–1971 – Natale "Joe Diamonds" Evola – became boss
- 1971–1973 – Phillip "Rusty" Rastelli – became boss
- 1973–1979 – Nicholas "Nicky Glasses" Marangello (demoted)
- 1981–1991 – Joseph "Big Joe" Massino (imprisoned in 1984)
  - Acting 1984–1991 – Louis "Louie Ha Ha" Attanasio
- 1992–2003 – Salvatore "Handsome Sal" Vitale (became FBI informant in March 2003)
  - Acting 2001–2002 – Richard "Shellackhead" Cantarella (became an FBI informant in December 2002, and in June 2004 testified against Bonanno boss Joseph Massino.)
  - Acting 2003–2004 – Joseph "Joe C." Cammarano Sr.
  - Acting 2004 – Michael "The Nose" Mancuso – became acting boss
- 2004–2007 – Nicholas "Nicky Mouth" Santora – Imprisoned in 2007
- 2013–2015 – Thomas DiFiore
  - Acting 2015 – Joseph Cammarano Jr.
- 2015–2019 – Joseph Cammarano Jr. – indicted on January 12, 2018, acquitted March 13, 2019
- 2019–2021 – Ernest "Ernie" Aiello – stepped down
- 2021–present – John "Johnny Joe" Spirito, Sr.
  - Acting 2025–present – Ernest "Ernie" Aiello

=== Consigliere (official and acting) ===
- c. 1930s – Frank Italiano
- 1932–1939 – Phillipe Rapa
- 1940–1964 – John Tartamella
- 1964–1968 – Salvatore "Bill" Bonanno
  - Acting 1965–1968 – Nicolino "Nick" Alfano – for the DiGregorio faction
  - Acting 1968 – Michael "Mike" Adamo
- 1968–1971 – Phillip "Rusty" Rastelli (promoted to underboss in 1971)
- 1971–1974 – Joseph DiFilippi
- 1974–1984 – Stefano "Stevie Beefs" Cannone
- 1984–2001 – Anthony Spero (acting boss from 1987 to 1993, died September 29, 2008)
  - Acting 1987–1992 – Joseph Buccellato
  - Acting 1999–2001 – Anthony "T.G." Graziano – became official consigliere
- 2001–2010 – Anthony "T.G." Graziano
  - Acting 2001–2003 – Anthony "Tony Green" Urso – became acting boss
  - Acting 2004–2007 – Anthony "Fat Tony" Rabito – imprisoned
- 2010–2015 – Anthony "Fat Tony" Rabito
  - Acting 2012–2013 – Ernest "Ernie" Aiello
  - Acting 2013–2014 – Vincent "Vinny T.V." Badalamenti
  - Acting 2014–2015 – Simone Esposito
- 2015–2016 – Simone Esposito – was shelved and later indicted on January 12, 2018
- 2016–2019 – John "Porky" Zancocchio – indicted on January 12, 2018, acquitted March 13, 2019
  - Acting 2017–2019 – Vincent "Vinny T.V." Badalamenti – served as the Mancuso faction Consigliere
- 2019–2022 – Vincent "Vinny T.V." Badalamenti – stepped down
- 2023–present – Anthony "Bruno" Indelicato
  - Acting 2023–2025 – Ernest "Ernie" Aiello
  - Acting 2025–present – Robert "Little Robert" Lino Jr.

== Current members ==
=== Administration ===
- Boss — Michael "Mikey Nose" Mancuso — current boss of the family. A Bronx native, he is the son of Anthony "Tony Nose" Mancuso, a Lucchese family soldier who was shot to death inside a bar in 1967, when Michael was 12 years old. He became affiliated with the Purple Gang in his early adulthood, and was injured in a shootout with a rival crew in Williamsburg, Brooklyn in 1976, subsequently being arrested on weapons charges, for which he would be convicted two years later. In 1984, Mancuso shot and killed his wife Evelina during a domestic dispute, later dumping her body on a bench in front of Jacobi Medical Center; he was convicted of manslaughter in 1986 and sentenced to 10 years in prison, being released in 1996. After regaining his freedom, he became a member of the Bonanno family, and acted as a conspirator in the murder of capo Gerlando "George From Canada" Sciascia in 1999. In 2004, Vincent "Vinny Gorgeous" Basciano promoted Mancuso to acting underboss, then to acting boss after Basciano was arrested on racketeering charges in November of that year. On November 30, 2004, acting on Basciano's orders along with capo Dominick Cicale and soldier Anthony "Ace" Aiello, he had associate Randolph Pizzolo killed for infuriating Basciano. Mancuso and his co-conspirators were indicted on racketeering and murder charges stemming from Pizzolo's killing in 2006, pleading guilty in 2008 and being sentenced to 15 years in prison. Authorities believe he was appointed as official boss of the family after he began serving his sentence, and he controlled the organization from prison through a series of acting bosses. Mancuso was released from prison on March 12, 2019, with three years' conditional release to serve. While on parole, he regularly met with fellow mobsters and associates, and he was arrested on supervised release violation charges on March 15, 2022. After pleading guilty, Mancuso was sentenced to 11 months in prison and another 3 years' supervised release on July 28, 2023, and he surrendered to prison authorities on September 6. He was incarcerated at FCI Allenwood Low, Pennsylvania and was released on July 28, 2024.
- Acting boss/underboss — John "Johnny Joe" Spirito, Sr. — current acting boss and underboss of the family. Spirito was involved in the 1999 murder of capo Gerlando Sciascia, and was sentenced to 20 years in prison after conviction. Former family underboss Salvatore Vitale provided testimony to convict Spirito. He was released from prison on supervised release on September 1, 2020. Spirito is currently a target of the supervised release investigation of family boss Michael Mancuso, and has been cited as the family's "number two".
- Street boss/acting underboss — Ernest "Ernie" Aiello — current street boss and acting underboss of the family. Aiello was a former capo operating in the Bronx and Brooklyn. Aiello used to be an acting capo for Nicholas "Nicky Mouth" Santora along with Vito Badamo. In 2012, he and acting capo John "Johnny Joe" Spirito Jr., as well as 20 to 25 Bonanno mobsters stormed the Lucchese family-managed Coddington Club in the Bronx as a "show of force". The incident emerged after Lucchese family acting boss Matthew Madonna stated he did not recognize Michael Mancuso as the Bonanno family boss. On July 9, 2013, Aiello and eight other Bonanno family mobsters, including Santora and Badamo, were indicted on enterprise corruption, gambling, loan sharking, extortion and drug trafficking charges. The case ended in a mistrial on May 10, 2016. Along with capo John Sciremammano and soldier John Spirito Jr., Aiello stormed the Glen Cove funeral home where a service was held honoring former capo Vito Grimaldi. The trio assaulted former acting boss Joseph Cammarano Jr. and his brother Dino, allegedly on the orders of Michael Mancuso. He served as acting consigliere while Mancuso was in prison for violating his parole restrictions.
- Consigliere — Anthony "Bruno" Indelicato — current consigliere of the family. Indelicato was a soldier in his uncle, Joseph Indelicato's crew and the son of Alphonse "Sonny Red" Indelicato. He became a made member in the late 1970s, and may have participated in the 1979 murder of Carmine Galante. In 1986, Indelicato was a defendant in the Mafia Commission Trial, where he was sentenced to 45 years and released in 2000 from prison. On December 16, 2008, Indelicato received a 20-year prison sentence for the 2001 murder of Frank Santoro. On May 20, 2022, Indelicato was released from Federal Correctional Institution, Danbury. He became the consigliere in 2024.
- Acting consigliere — Robert "Little Robert" Lino Jr. — current acting consigliere of the family.

=== Caporegimes ===
Brooklyn faction

- John "Big John" Contello — capo operating from Brooklyn and Florida. Contello is a former acting capo of the 'Joseph "Junior" Chilli's crew'. Contello was a target of an August 28, 2008, indictment that charged him with racketeering, illegal gambling and conspiracy. In June 2009, he was sentenced to 31 to 37 months in prison.
- Joseph "Joe Desi" DeSimone — capo operating from Brooklyn. In 1981, DeSimone was involved in the murder of his own capo Philip Giaccone and the murders of two other capos Dominick Trinchera and Alphonse Indelicato. In 2016, he was released from prison and violated supervised release and was sent back to prison. On November 10, 2017, he was released from prison. In May 2018, DeSimone and Genovese family capo John Brescio came under investigation for their involvement with Parx Casino.

Queens faction

- Jerome "Jerry" Asaro — capo of the "Howard Beach-Asaro crew". His father was Vincent Asaro, a former capo in the Bonanno family. In 2014, Asaro was charged with exhuming the corpse of a gangland murder victim Paul Katz who was strangled with a dog chain by his father Vincent Asaro and James Burke. On June 15, 2020, Asaro was released from prison.
- Anthony Fasitta — capo operating in Queens. Bonanno family boss Michael Mancuso met with Fasitta a number of times during his probation.
- Anthony "Little Anthony" Pipitone — capo operating in Queens, Brooklyn and Long Island. On October 7, 2009, Pipitone was indicted along with capo Joseph Sammartino, capo Anthony Sclafani, acting capo Joseph Loiacono, soldiers Frank Pastore and Paul Spina among other members on racketeering charges. In June 2016, Pipitone was sentenced to two years in prison for violating his parole when he attended a Bonanno family Christmas party on Staten Island. Pipitone had served time in prison for stabbing two men, after they had broken windows of a mob-connected restaurant in Whitestone, Queens. On August 16, 2022, Pipitone was among nine men arrested, including his younger brother Vito, and charged with racketeering, money laundering, illegal gambling, conspiracy, obstruction of justice, and other charges. Members from the Bonnano as well as the Genovese families were arrested. The group used front businesses in Queens and Long Island to launder illegal profits. Pipitone was released on $2 million bond.

Bronx faction

- Pasquale "Patty Boy" Maiorino — capo operating from the Bronx. Maiorino served 20 years for a 1981, murder and in 2015, was sent back to prison on a gun charge. In 2017, he was detained pending sentencing on a separate extortion charge associated with Genovese capo Pasquale Parrello of the Bronx.

Staten Island faction

- Joseph "Joe Valet" Sabella — capo operating from Staten Island and Brooklyn. In 2019, Sabella was sentenced to 87 months in prison for his involvement in the dumping of illegal material at the LNG site in Rossville, Staten Island. On October 23, 2024, Sabella was released from prison.
  - Acting — Arthur "Harvey" Tarzia — acting capo of Sabella's crew.

Long Island faction

- John "Johnny Mulberry" Sciremammano — capo operating from Long Island and the Bronx. In June 2004, Sciremammano was arrested for running an illegal sports betting from Skybox Lounge, in Island Park and wiring the money to accounts in Costa Rica. Along with capo Ernest Aiello and soldier John Spirito Jr., Sciremammano stormed the Glen Cove funeral home where a service was held honoring former capo Vito Grimaldi. The trio assaulted former acting boss Joseph Cammarano Jr. and his brother Dino, allegedly on the orders of Michael Mancuso.

Florida faction

- Peter "Petey Pasta" Pellegrino — capo operating a Florida crew with some Sicilian ("Zip") members operation in Ridgewood, Queens. Pellegrino is known for being on the first episode of Gordon Ramsay's Kitchen Nightmares.

=== Soldiers ===
- Anthony "Ace" Aiello — soldier. In December 2008, he took a plea deal for the killing of a Bonanno family associate. Aiello was sentenced to 30 years' imprisonment. Released from prison December 2025.
- Albert "Al Muscles" Armetta — soldier. On January 12, 2018, he was indicted on racketeering and assault charges along with acting boss Joseph "Joe C" Cammarano Jr., consigliere John "Porky" Zancocchio and seven other defendants from the Bonanno, Lucchese and Genovese families. Armetta was charged with assaulting an individual on Halloween 2015 to gain entry into the Bonanno family, and he was released from prison on February 12, 2020. He attended the wake of former Lucchese family consigliere Frank Lastorino in November 2022.
- Louis "Louie Ha Ha" Attanasio — a former capo in the Bronx. Attanasio, along with his brother Robert "Bobby Ha Ha" and Peter Calabrese, murdered Bonanno family Sicilian faction member Cesare Bonventre in 1984. On September 20, 2006, Attanasio and Peter Calabrese were sentenced to 15 years in prison for the 1984 Bonventre murder. Attanasio's projected release date is January 23, 2018. His brother, only an associate of the Bonanno family, was sentenced to two years of supervised release and ordered to home confinement with GPS monitoring for the first six months by Senior United States District Judge Nicholas Garaufis. He was accused of affiliating with members of the Bonanno and Gambino crime families, including playing bocce with Louis Vallario, a capo of the Gambino crime family, which Attanasio pled guilty to. It was also revealed that Robert Attanasio was suffering from prostate cancer in 2017. He was released from prison on January 23, 2018.
- Vincent "Vinny T.V." Badalamenti — former consigliere. He is the former capo of the "Bensonhurst crew". Badalamenti has served as the former acting boss and consigliere. In December 2009, Badalamenti was found with Staten Island-based capo Anthony Calabrese and soldier John "Johnny Green" Faracithe meeting at a Bensonhurst storefront. He served as acting boss from early 2010 until 2012 when he was imprisoned.
- Vito Badamo — former acting capo of Nicholas Santora's "Graham Avenue, Williamsburg crew". In July 2013, Badamo was indicted, along with capo Nicholas Santora, acting capo Ernest Aiello, soldier Anthony Santoro and others, on racketeering, loansharking, illegal gambling and drug dealing charges. It was stated in court that Santora was training Badamo to take control of the crew in the future. In May 2016, Badamo and the others were released after their case ended in a mistrial. On May 18, 2017, Badamo was sentenced to three to seven years in prison on illegal gambling charges. The remaining members of his crew, Anthony Santoro, Dominick Siano, Nicholas Bernhard, Scott O'Neil, Anthony Urban and Richard Sinde, had all pled guilty of various crimes and were sentenced.
- Anthony Calabrese — former acting capo in Staten Island. Calabrese is the son of former family ruling panel member Peter "Rabbit" Calabrese, and was previously convicted and served time in prison for second-degree burglary, promoting gambling and reckless endangerment. During the 1990s and 2000s, he operated a club in Staten Island, and later helped mediate a dispute with Colombo family associate Francis Guerra and capo Anthony Russo over Bonanno associate Eugene Lombardo stealing Guerra's relatives' pizza recipe to use it in his own restaurant, which Calabrese resolved by paying Guerra $1500 as restitution. On December 15, 2009, Calabrese, capo Vincent Badalamenti and John Faraci were arrested during a DEA raid on a Bensonhurst social club, before being promptly released from custody. He was indicted on racketeering, extortion and illegal gambling charges along with Badalamenti and four others on January 27, 2012, pleading guilty and being released from prison on May 10, 2013.
- Joseph "Joe Saunders" Cammarano Jr. — former street boss and acting underboss for the family. Cammarano Jr. was a capo operating a crew in Brooklyn. After his father Joseph "Joe Saunders" Cammarano Sr., died on September 3, 2013, Cammarano Jr. took over his father's crew. Cammarano Jr. was indicted in January 2018 on racketeering and murder conspiracy charges along with John Zancocchio, effectively ending his reign as street boss. Cammarano Jr. was acquitted on March 13, 2019, and was reportedly "shelved", or deactivated, by Mancuso.
- Dino Cammarano — brother to Joseph Cammarano Jr. He was reportedly "shelved", or deactivated, in 2019 with his brother.
- Michael Cassese — soldier. Cassese was one of numerous family members indicted on February 6, 2007. The family members, which included underboss Nicholas Santora and acting consigliere Anthony Rabito, were arraigned on charges of racketeering and other related crimes. Cassese was released from prison on May 22, 2014.
- Peter Cosoleto (born February 1947) — soldier. In March 2002, Cosoleto was indicted for racketeering conspiracy, illegal gambling and conspiracy to distribute marijuana. He was sentenced to 10 years in prison in December 2006.
- Perry Criscitelli (born May 1950) — soldier. Criscitelli had once served as the President of the San Gennaro feast in 1996. He stepped down as the President in July 2004 after allegations of his involvement in organized crime and that he had become a member of the Bonanno family in 2001. By the early 2000s, Criscitelli owned four restaurants within the Mulberry Street area of Lower Manhattan..
- Louis "Louie Electric" DeCicco — former capo in Brooklyn with operations in Queens and Long Island. In March 2007, DeCicco was arrested along with other Bonanno capos. On December 31, 2009, DeCicco was released from prison.
- Fabrizio "The Herder" DeFrancisci — soldier. DeFrancisci is a founding member of the Bath Avenue Crew, the infamous Bonanno farm team. DeFrancisci was sentenced to 50 years' imprisonment for murder. He was released from prison to a halfway house in May 2023.
- Thomas "Tommy D" DiFiore — a former acting boss and former capo. In 1979, DiFiore was thrown out of the Giaccone crew for getting into an argument with capo Philip Giaccone. By 1990, DiFiore had become a capo in the family and handled most of the actives on Long Island. In May 2000, DiFiore and two members of the Gambino crime family, capo Salvatore Scala and soldier Charles Carneglia, were arrested and charged with extortion. The FBI had recorded a mob sit-down on May 3, 2000, between DiFiore, Scala and Carneglia over who had the right to extort Cherry Video a sex shop on Long Island. On November 2, 2001, all three were sentenced to 63 months for extortion. DiFiore was released from prison on March 19, 2004. In 2013, he became the family underboss and acting boss for imprisoned boss Michael Mancuso. In January 2014, he was arrested on extortion charges along with Vincent Asaro. He was released from prison on August 4, 2015.
- Vincent "Vinny Bionics" DiSario — soldier. On August 28, 2008, DiSario was arrested as part of a federal indictment and charged with racketeering, extortion and illegal gambling, allegedly earning $2000 per week from a sports betting ring. In 2009, DiSario pleaded guilty to a single count of collecting unlawful debts, and was sentenced to 18 to 24 months in prison.
- Joseph "Joe Shakes" DiStefano — soldier. In October 2004, DiStefano pled guilty to extortion of a nightclub on Long Island, and he was sentenced to two years in prison.
- Anthony Donato (born May 1958) — soldier In November 2005, Donato pled guilty to attempted murder, illegal gambling and racketeering conspiracy. In August 2006, Donato pled guilty to conspiracy to murder in aid of racketeering, and in December 2008, he was sentenced to 25 years in prison after he was found guilty of conspiring with Anthony "Bruno" Indelicato and acted as a driver in connection with the February 2001 murder of Frank Santoro.
- Vincent Faraci (born April 1955) — soldier. In December 2013, Faraci was sentenced to over a year in prison after he had pled guilty to filing a false tax return in 2006 worth an amount of over $180,000.
- Nicholas "Pudgie" Festa (born August 1978) — soldier. In March 2017, Festa was indicted by the FBI for loansharking, and in March 2018, Festa pled guilty to racketeering conspiracy and loansharking, and he was sentenced to 6 years in prison with $500,000 in forfeiture.
- Thomas Fiore — former acting capo of Gerard Chilli's South Florida crew. He is based in the Palm Beach County city of Boynton Beach. On October 14, 2009, his crew in South Florida was charged under the RICO law. Six of the eleven crew members, including crew enforcer Pasquale Rubbo and his brother Joseph Rubbo, pled guilty to a list of crimes. The crew is involved in arson, insurance fraud, identity theft, illegal gambling and other crimes. They send some tribute to Bonanno family bosses in New York City. On March 2, 2010, Fiore was sentenced to twelve years for racketeering. Released from prison on October 23, 2019.
- Anthony "Tony Black" Furino — former capo based in Staten Island. In 2004, Furino was arrested for extortion of Long Island night clubs and Staten Island restaurants. In 2007, Furino was released from prison.
- Anthony "the Hat/Perry Como" Frascone — former capo operating from Brooklyn and the Bronx who came up in the Dominick Trinchera crew. Frascone was involved in a large-scale illegal gambling operation along with Genovese soldier Victor Colletti. On November 30, 2011, Frascone was indicted with several members on charges stemming from the extortion of several Queens and Long Island strip clubs, who employed dancers who were not authorized to work in the US. On November 7, 2024, Frascone was among five men indicted for running a Long Island-based online illegal gambling operation.
- Gino Galestro — a former newspaper delivery truck driver and soldier who operated in Staten Island. He pled guilty to ordering the murder of associate Robert McKelvey over a debt in 2005. He was released from prison on June 24, 2022.
- Ronald "Ronnie G" Giallanzo — former capo of the "Howard Beach-Asaro crew". Giallanzo is the nephew of Vincent Asaro. In 2018, Giallanzo was sentenced to 14 years in prison for running a $3 million loansharking business. During the trial prosecutors stated that Giallanzo was capo of the Howard Beach crew between 1998 and 2017, even overseeing their operations while in prison for eight years. Giallanzo has been released from prison in May 2025, and is currently getting cancer treatment.
- Joseph Indelicato (born 1931) — a former capo in Manhattan and New Jersey. Indelicato was initially a Gambino family associate affiliated with Vincent "Jimmy the Blond" Corrao. According to prosecution witness Joseph "Joe Fish" Luparelli, Indelicato participated in the February 1970 murder of Joseph "Wagon Wheel" Vescovi, who was lured to an apartment on Elizabeth Street and allegedly stabbed and strangled by Indelicato, Carmine Persico, John "Big Head" Arcaro and Anthony "Blackie" Calabro. During the 1970s, Indelicato was allegedly involved in narcotics trafficking on behalf of Lucchese family capo Joseph "Joe Beck" DiPalermo, and partnered with Colombo family associate Dominic "Little Dom" Cataldo. Indelicato was inducted into the Bonanno family in 1977. In 1981, Indelicato took over the crew of his deceased brother, Alphonse "Sonny Red" Indelicato. Joseph's nephew, Anthony "Bruno" Indelicato, was a soldier in the crew. In May 1983, Indelicato was released from prison after serving 13 months for contempt. By 1999, Indelicato was reporting to capo Richard "Shellackhead" Cantarella. Following Cantarella's defection to law enforcement, Indelicato was reporting to Vincent Basciano and later Dominic Cicale.
- Joseph "Joe Lefty" Loiacono — former acting capo who was arrested on October 14, 2009, for running a loansharking operation. He was released on May 18, 2012.
- Ronald "Ronnie" Lorenzo — soldier. In November 1993, Lorenzo was sentenced to 11 years in prison for selling six kilograms of cocaine to an FBI informant. It is noted actor James Caan testified on behalf of Lorenzo at his trial.
- Anthony "Anthony from Elmont" Mannone; a.k.a. "Anthony from the Five Towns" — soldier and former capo. Mannone was born in March 1940. He was arrested by the FBI on February 24, 2010, for running an illegal gambling and extortion ring throughout Brooklyn. Manone was released from prison on June 27, 2013
- Daniel "Dirty Danny" Mongelli — released from prison in 2020.
- John "Johnny Skyway" Palazzolo — former street boss for Mancuso; a fellow member of the family's Bronx faction, Palazzolo was inducted into the organization in 1977, and remained active in criminal activity ever since, mainly operating extortion, loansharking and fraud rackets. In 1978, he served as a backup shooter in the attempted murder of associate Anthony Coglitore, who was shot 11 times as he entered the driveway of his Staten Island home as retribution for having tried to kill a member of the family. Palazzolo was also involved in the murder of soldier Russell Mauro in 1991, luring him to the Black Eagle Social Club in Astoria, Queens where soldier Joseph "Joe Desi" DeSimone and associate Peter "Petey Boxcars" Cosoleto shot him to death, with Palazzolo cleaning up the scene and disposing of Mauro's corpse. In 1994, he was convicted of interstate theft and sentenced to two years in prison, though he was later found guilty of running a loansharking ring from inside FCI Allenwood Low along with his father James and his son James Palace, and his sentence was extended by 57 months. In 2004, Palazzolo was indicted along with acting boss Anthony "Tony Green" Urso and 25 other defendants on racketeering and murder charges. He pled guilty to conspiring to murder Mauro and was sentenced to 10 years in prison, as well as being fined $100 in 2006. Upon his release in 2014, Palazzolo was promoted to street boss, but was arrested a year later for violating his parole due to having met with family members Anthony "Fat Anthony" Rabito and Frank "Frankie Boy" Salerno; he was sentenced to one year in prison. In 2019, Michael Mancuso named Palazzolo acting boss to replace Joseph "Joe C" Cammarano, Jr., whom he had recently shelved.
- Peter "Petey Pasta" Pellegrino — 'member operating in Florida with some Sicilian ("Zip") members in Ridgewood, Queens. Pellegrino is known for being on the first episode of Gordon Ramsay's Kitchen Nightmares.
- Vito Pipitone — soldier and younger brother of capo Anthony "Little Anthony" Pipitone. He was indicted on August 16, 2022, among other members of the Bonnano and Genovese families, and was charged with rackteering, illegal gambling, money laundering, and other charges.
- Frank Porco — former capo operating from Staten Island, Brooklyn and Florida. In 2005, Porco was released from prison.
- Salvatore Puccio — soldier operating in Florida. In February 2005, Puccio was among 23 people arrested along with capo Gerard "Gerry" Chilli for racketeering. He was charged with racketeering, conspiracy, money laundering, dealing with stolen property, and numerous illegal gambling-related crimes. In 2006, Puccio was sentenced to eight years in prison, after he was convicted of money laundering, conspiracy to commit arson and securities fraud, and that he had defrauded investors of at least $11 million. He was released on November 15, 2013.
- Anthony "Fat Tony" Rabito — the former acting consigliere for Vincent Basciano prior to his incarceration and a longtime member of the Bonanno family. From January 2003 to July 2004, Rabito operated an illegal gambling and loansharking ring in Brooklyn, Queens, Manhattan, and Staten Island, earning $210,000 a week.
- William "Willie Glasses" Riviello — a former capo operating in Manhattan, Brooklyn, Queens, Bronx and Westchester County. In 2004, Riviello was arrested for a stolen bank check scheme in the Bronx and Yonkers, New York, that grossed over $500,000 for the family. In 2007, Riviello was released from prison.
- Frank "Frankie Boy" Salerno — in 2016, he was indicted with Gambino family acting Capo John "Johnny Boy" Ambrosio and Gambino family associate John Saladino on loan sharking and racketeering charges. Salerno was sentenced to 4 years in prison for helping collect loan shark debts.
- Joseph "Sammy" Sammartino Sr. — a former capo of the "New Jersey crew". He was born and raised in Jersey City's Marion Section and currently resides in North Arlington, New Jersey. His crew is based in Bayonne, New Jersey, and he controls a loansharking ring. In 2009, he served on a ruling panel running the family. On October 14, 2009, Sammartino was arrested on loansharking charges. He was sentenced to 18 months in prison and a $50,000 fine for extortion and loansharking. On January 27, 2011, Sammartino was released from prison.
- Joseph "Joey Blue Eyes" Santapaolo — soldier. Santapaolo was indicted on January 12, 2018, along with acting boss Joseph Cammarano Jr., consigliere John Zancocchio, and several other members and associates.
- Anthony "Scal" Sclafani — former capo based in Staten Island with illegal gambling operations. On October 7, 2009, Sclafani was indicted along with capo Joseph Sammartino, capo Anthony Pipitone, acting capo Joseph Loiacono, and soldiers Frank Pastore and Paul Spina, among other members, on racketeering and loansharking charges. It was revealed in the case that Sclafani had owed $50,000 to capo Joseph Sammartino. Sclafani tried to stay out of law enforcement surveillance by staying in his home all day. He controlled illegal gambling from a social club on Victory Blvd. that was named after a Staten Island youth league. Sclafani was released from prison on February 14, 2014.
- Paul "Fat Paulie" Spina — soldier. Spina was one of numerous family members indicted on February 6, 2007. The family members, which included underboss Nicholas Santora and acting consigliere Anthony Rabito, were arraigned on charges of racketeering and other related crimes. Spina was released from prison on December 19, 2016.
- John "Johnny Joe" Spirito Jr. — former street boss and capo. He is the son of soldier John "Johnny Joe" Spirito Sr. and longtime member of the Bronx faction under former capo Patrick "Patty from the Bronx" DeFilippo. In 2003, Spirito Jr. along with Anthony Frascone were arrested on illegal gambling charges.
- Enzo "The Baker" Stagno — soldier. In May 2013, Stagno was shot in the chest located at East 111th Street and First Avenue, and survived. It later became common knowledge that Stagno was shot by Terrance Caldwell, an associate of the Lucchese family. Following the shooting he was shelved by the Bonanno family for admitting membership to law enforcement.
- George "Grumpy" Tropiano — former acting capo. Tropiano was indicted on January 12, 2018, along with acting boss Joseph Cammarano Jr., consigliere John Zancocchio, and several other members and associates. Tropiano was released from prison on January 13, 2022.
- Anthony "Tony Green" Urso — former capo and acting capo under Joseph Massino in the 1990s. In 2004, Urso was imprisoned for extortion and loansharking. He was released from prison on June 25, 2021.
- John "Porky" Zancocchio — former consigliere. Zancocchio was indicted in January 2018, on racketeering and murder conspiracy charges along with Joseph Cammarano Jr. Zancocchio was acquitted on March 13, 2019, and was reportedly "shelved", or deactivated, by Mancuso.

=== Imprisoned members ===
- Baldassare "Baldo" Amato (born December 1951) — Amato served as a soldier in the Sicilian faction of the Bonanno family, alongside his cousin and Bonanno family capo Cesare Bonventre, who was found shot to death and dismembered into two 55-gallon drums of glue in April 1984. He once served as a bodyguard to former boss Carmine Galante and was also with him on the day that he was murdered; it is alleged that he cooperated in Galante being murdered as his life was spared. In May 1984, Amato surrendered to a federal judge in New York as a consequence of his participation in the $1.6 billion "Pizza Connection" heroin smuggling conspiracy. In May 1988, Amato was sentenced to five years' imprisonment for his role in the heroin ring. He was later the leader of a freelance crew operating in Ridgewood, Queens. In October 2006, Amato was sentenced to life imprisonment for participating in two murders, named restaurant owner Sabastiano DiFalco and New York Post delivery supervisor Robert Perrino in May 1992, and racketeering.
- Vincent John "Vinny Gorgeous" Basciano Sr. (born November 1959) — In 1987, Basciano was sentenced to 1 year in prison for possession of a firearm. In June 2005, Basciano was indicted for murder, arson, loansharking and illegal gambling, according to prosecutors, Basciano operated an illegal gambling business from between 1979 and 2003, he had operated a gambling business involving video-poker machines from between 1979 and 2005, he had participated in the attempted murder of David Nunez in November 1985, he had also operated a bookmaking business from between 1990 and 2003, Basciano had extorted Generoso Barbieri and John Palazzolo from between 1990 and 1994, he was involved in a extortion conspiracy from between 1996 and 2002, Basciano was implicated in the extortion of Frank Giannini from between 1996 and 2001 and also for the extortion of an unnamed male from between 1998 and 2001, Basciano was also alleged for distribution of marijuana from between 2000 and 2002, for operating a sports betting ring from between 2000 and 2004, and a lottery numbers operation from between January and December 2004, he was also accused of participating in the March 1999 murder of Gerlando Sciascia, for the participation of the murder of Frank Santoro in February 2001, and also for participating in the 2002 murder of Dominick Martino, and for the extortion of Peter Calabrese in 2004. In 2008, and again in 2011, Basciano was sentenced to life imprisonment for murder and racketeering.
- Salvatore "Totò" Catalano (born February 1941) — former capo and "street boss" of the Sicilian faction. The Sicilian-born Catalano was brought to the United States in the 1970s to serve as a bodyguard to Carmine Galante. After the murder of Pietro Licata in 1976, he became the capo of the Sicilian "Knickerbocker Avenue Crew". Catalano was heavily involved in the "Pizza Connection", a major trans-Atlantic heroin ring. The heroin was shipped into the U.S. and sold through pizzerias in New York City and New Jersey. On March 2, 1987, Catalano was sentenced to 45 years in prison and fined $1.15 million. He was released from prison on November 16, 2009. In November 2024, Catalano was arrested in Sicily on charges of extortion and possession of weapons.
- Stephen "Stevie Blue" LoCurto (born January 1961) — In 1987, LoCurto was acquitted of the 1986 murder of Joseph Platia. In July 2006, he was convicted of racketeering and of participation in the May 1986 murder of Bonanno family associate Robert Capasio. LoCurto was sentenced by former U.S. District Judge Nicholas Garaufis to life imprisonment in October 2006.
- Thomas "Tommy Karate" Pitera (born December 1954) — In June 1990, Pitera and around 20 to 25 other Bonanno family affiliates were arrested by the DEA, and were implicated in a major drug ring suspected of distributing marijuana, cocaine and heroin. At the time law enforcement alleged Pitera of involvement in at least 30 murders, including the murder of Wilfred Johnson in August 1988, as a favour to Gambino family boss John Gotti. In June 1992, Pitera was convicted of participating in 6 murders. According to prosecutors in 1993, Pitera was involved in kidnapping, murder, drug trafficking, and armed robbery, although it is believed he was predominately active in drug dealing and murder for hire within the New York area. He is currently serving his sentence in federal prison.
- John "Bazoo" Ragano (born April 1962) — In March 2025, Bonanno soldier Ragano was sentenced by U.S. District Judge Hector Gonzalez to three years in federal prison with $3,000 in forfeiture for extortion in connection with a $150,000 loan. A cooperating witness had secretly recorded Ragano, showing him forcing the man to strip to see if he was wearing a wire.

== Former members ==
- Sandro Aiosa — former capo in Ozone Park, Queens. Aiosa was described as a member of the Sicilian Mafia involved in heroin and cocaine trafficking, and he owned two clubs, the Signora Social Club in Queens and another one in Ozone Park. Aiosa was indicted on several gambling charges along with family acting boss Anthony "Tony Green" Urso and 25 other defendants on January 20, 2004, pleading guilty on October 22, 2004. He was sentenced to 12 months in prison, three years' supervised release and fined $100 on March 4, 2005, being released from custody on October 12, 2012. Aiosa died on May 1, 2023, aged 80.
- Vincent "Vinny" Asaro — former capo. During the 1990s, Asaro allegedly operated a multimillion-dollar stolen car ring and oversaw the hijacking of cargo at John F. Kennedy International Airport. In 1998, Asaro was convicted of running a car theft ring. In 2015, Asaro was acquitted of alleged involvement in the 1978 Lufthansa robbery with Lucchese family associates in which $21.3 million in today's money was reported stolen. In June 2017, Asaro was sentenced to eight years in prison for ordering the arson of a car that had cut him off in Howard Beach, Queens. He was granted compassionate release and was released on April 18, 2020, over fears of the COVID-19 outbreak. Asaro died on October 22, 2023.
- Francesco "Frank" Bonomo — former soldier. Bonoma was born in 1901 in Castellammare del Golfo, Sicily. He was a soldier for the Bonanno family by the late 1930s. Bonomo allegedly drove Mike Adamo and Frank Mari to a meeting they were both presumed murdered at in 1968 as a result of plotting to overthrow the leadership of Bonanno boss Paul Sciacca. Bonomo served as an acting capo during the late 1970s before Carmine Galante promoted him to official captain. He died in 1987.
- Cesare "The Tall Guy" Bonventre — a former capo and member of the Sicilian faction. He was related to Vito Bonventre, John Bonventre, and Joseph Bonanno. He was murdered on April 16, 1984.
- John "Boobie" Cerasani — former soldier and right-hand man to "Sonny Black" Napolitano. Cerasani was involved in the 1981 murders of three warring captains Alphonse Indelicato, Dominick Trinchera and Philip Giaccone. On July 26, 1982, Cerasani, Benjamin "Lefty" Ruggiero, Anthony Rabito, Nicholas Santora and Antonio Tomasulo were tried in Manhattan federal district court. Cerasani was later acquitted.
- Gerard "Gerry" Chilli — capo who controlled a crew in Staten Island, Chilli controlled the family's Florida operations in Broward County, from his Hollywood home with his nephew Thomas Fiore, who is still currently an active member. He died September 10, 2016.
- Louis "Louie the Leg-Breaker" Civello Sr. — former capo. Civello was born in Brooklyn on November 26, 1951. He was originally a member of the "Cammarano crew" and was inducted into the Bonanno family in the early 2000s before being promoted to capo of the "New Jersey crew" in the late 2000s. In 2015, Civello along with his son Louis Civello Jr. were under investigation due to their ownership of NJDAM and their involvement in car related fraud. He was reportedly "shelved", or deactivated, by the family circa 2018 after allegedly joining a rogue faction which opposed boss Michael Mancuso. Civello died from cancer on February 25, 2026, aged 74.
- Michael "Michael Bruno" Consolo — former soldier. In April 1968 or 1969, shortly after defecting to the DiGregorio faction, was shot and killed after insulting Bill Bonanno.
- James "Jimmy Legs" Episcopia — a soldier who worked for capo "Sonny Black" Napolitano.
- Joseph Giddio — former soldier. Giddio was born in Manhattan on August 9, 1927. In March 1978, he was arrested by the NYPD in an illegal gambling raid in which over $1,200 in cash was seized. By the 1980s, Giddio was associated with Joseph "Junior" Chilli and Gerald "Gerry" Chilli, with whom he was partnered in illegal gambling and loansharking operations at the Fulton Fish Market. In April 1989, he was indicted along with eight others for violence and threats, fraud, loansharking, murder and conspiracy. He pleaded guilty in December 1989 and was sentenced by former U.S. District Judge Robert P. Patterson Jr. to five years in prison with a $50,000 fine. Giddio was released in April 1993. By the 2010s, Giddio was allegedly an inducted member of the Bonanno family. He died in September 2021.
- Vito Grimaldi – former capo of the "Bushwick-Ridgewood crew". He operates illegal poker machines in Ridgewood, Queens from cafes and pizzerias. In 2002, he was arrested on illegal gambling and racketeering charges; he later pled guilty and was sentenced to two years in prison. Grimaldi owns a bakery in Ridgewood, Queens. His son Joseph Grimaldi is also a made man in the Bonanno family. His son-in-law is former acting boss Joseph Cammarano Jr. Along with his son, Grimaldi was temporarily shelved in 2019 following the acquittal of Joseph Cammarano Jr. and John Zancocchio. Grimaldi died on July 15, 2022.
- Frank "Frank Russo" Mari — former soldier. Mari was born in 1926 and was identified in 1965 as a member of the Bonanno family. During the 'Banana Wars' Mari switched sides from Bill Bonanno to Gaspar DiGregorio. In July 1966, Mari was shot on a street in Brooklyn and survived. In September 1969, he disappeared and was presumed murdered.
- Domenick Miniero — former soldier. Miniero was indicted on January 12, 2018, along with acting boss Joseph Cammarano Jr., consigliere John Zancocchio, and several other members and associates. Miniero died on November 8, 2019.
- Salvatore "Sal the Iron Worker" Montagna — capo and acting boss after the 2005 conviction of Vincent Basciano. Based in the Bronx, Montagna was reportedly the leader of the Sicilian faction. Montagna was born in Montreal, Quebec, Canada and resided in Elmont, New York. His family originated from Castellammare del Golfo, Sicily. On April 21, 2009, Montagna was deported to Canada and he settled in Montreal. In Montreal, Montagna tried to assume control of the Rizzuto crime family while its leader, Vito Rizzuto, was imprisoned in the United States. Montagna was assassinated on November 24, 2011, outside of Montreal, his body was found near Repentigny, Quebec, in the Assomption River, on Île Vaudry, having been shot at around 10 am.
- Samuel "Hank" Perrone — former soldier. Perrone was born in 1930 and was part of the West Coast faction, led by Bill Bonanno. He was shot and killed in March 1968 after being accused of cooperating with law enforcement.
- Gerlando "George from Canada" Sciascia — a former capo who worked with the Sicilian faction in New York. Sciascia served as mediator between Bonanno family and Montreal's Rizzuto family in the 1990s. He was murdered on March 18, 1999.
- Carlo "Buddy" Simari — former soldier. Simari was born in 1918 and was part of the Bill Bonanno faction of the family. Simari was active in Tucson, Arizona area. He died in 1992.
- Joseph "Joe Curly" Taglianetti — former soldier. Taglianetti was born in Little Italy, Manhattan on May 19, 1933. In October 1958, Taglianetti and Anthony Soldano were arrested for attempting to rob the Carolina Garment Company at 1406 65th Street in New York and managed to obtain over $5,100 in cash. He pleaded guilty to robbery and was sentenced to over seven years in prison. Taglianetti began his sentence at Sing Sing prison in June 1959 and was released in October 1967. In April 1971, Taglianetti was indicted for large scale illegal gambling along with affiliates of the Bonanno, Colombo, Genovese and Gambino families. He was sentenced to two years in prison in March 1974 and served his sentence at the Federal Correctional Institution in Danbury, Connecticut. Taglianetti was suspected of participating in the May 1975 murder of Frank Leonard. By 1979, he was inducted into the Bonanno family. In May 1979, Taglianetti was indicted for conspiracy, interstate transport of stolen property and firearm charges. He was released on bond and became a fugitive during the following months before he was apprehended in February 1980. In July 1980, Taglianetti was convicted of conspiracy. In September 1980, Taglianetti was sentenced by former U.S. District Judge Marvin Herman Shoob to five years in prison. He was released from the United States Penitentiary in Lewisburg, Pennsylvania in November 1983. Taglianetti was subsequently assigned to the crew headed by capo Gabriel "Gabe" Infanti, and later to the Anthony Spero crew. By 1991, he was in the crew operated by James "Big Lou" Tartaglione. In February 1992, Taglianetti was arrested during a raid by the FBI at the Grand Avenue Social Club in Maspeth, Queens. In June 1992, he was arrested by the NYPD for conspiracy and for the sale and possession of heroin. In July 1992, Taglianetti was sentenced by Judge Leslie Crocker Snyder to 75 months in prison at the Downstate Correctional Facility. In July 2001, he was arrested by the FBI for extortion and conspiracy, and was released on $250,000 bond. Taglianetti pleaded guilty in December 2002, and was sentenced by Judge Faith S. Hochberg to 46 months in prison. He was released from the Federal Medical Center in Devens, Massachusetts in March 2007. Taglianetti died in January 2016.
- Salvatore "Sally Horse" Tozzi — former soldier. Tozzi was born in Manhattan on February 9, 1945. In October 1969, Tozzi and Ronald Costa were arrested by the FBI for participating in a truck hijacking at JFK International Airport containing $400,000 worth of precious metals. According to media coverage at the time, Tozzi had both of his legs broken for committing the hijacking without permission from the Bonanno family. In 1970, Tozzi was sentenced to 18 months in prison for the hijacking. By the 1980s, Tozzi served as an associate in the crew headed by then-Bonanno family capo Anthony Spero. In December 1984, Tozzi was photographed by law enforcement for attending the wedding of John Gotti's daughter at the Marina Del Ray Caterers in the Bronx. In around February 1991, Tozzi was allegedly inducted into the Bonanno family. In May 1991, Tozzi participated in the murder of Bonanno family soldier Russell Mauro. In June 1993, Tozzi was found inside of his East Village apartment with a gunshot in the back of his head.
- Michael "Mickey Z" Zaffarano — a former capo who was involved in the adult entertainment industry. Anthony Mirra, a soldier in his crew, was responsible for allowing FBI agent Joseph D. Pistone ("Donnie Brasco") to work undercover in the Bonanno crime family. On February 14, 1980, Zaffarano died from a heart attack during an FBI raid.

== Government informants and witnesses ==
- William Joseph Dara – he is the first confirmed Bonanno informant. He was born on July 12, 1905, in Sicily, and immigrated to the United States in 1910. Dara was active in the Florida and Miami area. He became a soldier in the Bonanno crime family around 1949 or 1950. Dara became an informer and decided to cooperate in late 1967, two days after he was sentenced to seven and a half years in prison for attempting to extort $250,000 from a Miami-based trucking company owner. It is noted by the FBI that in 1968, alongside Bonanno capo Michael Sabella, he and Dara met with Lucchese crime family capo Paul Vario and acting boss Ettore Coco in Miami in order to keep the peace between the two crime families. He died on July 9, 1982, in a plane crash in Louisiana.
- Joseph Calco – former associate with the Bath Avenue crew, a follower and subgroup of the Bonanno crime family. He was the triggerman in the hit on childhood friend and Bath Avenue crew leader Paul Gulino on July 25, 1993. In 2001, Calco became a government witness and testified against Bonanno consigliere Anthony Spero. Calco then entered the Witness Protection Program under the name "Joseph Milano". While working at a pizzeria he owned in Florida, Calco assaulted and pistol whipped a customer who complained about his calzone order in 2009, and his true identity became public knowledge; he was sentenced to six months in prison in November 2011.
- Michael "Mikey Y" Yammine – former associate with the Bath Avenue crew. In 2001, Yammine became a government informant. Alongside fellow Bath Avenue crew member and government witness Joseph Calco, he testified in March 2001 against the former Bonanno family consigliere, Anthony "Old Man" Spero.
- Vincenzo Morena – former soldier who was active with the Bonanno-Giannini crew in Queens. He was sentenced to over four years' imprisonment in 2001. Morena was secretly an informer since at least the early 2000s. He was part of the November 2015 law enforcement operation which targeted the Bonanno and Gambino families, and which oversaw an employed law enforcement agent secretly become an American Mafia member for the first time in history, Morena himself was inducted and the ceremony was recorded.
- Frank Coppa Sr. – former capo and close friend of Joseph Massino. He was inducted into the Bonanno crime family in mid-1977 by Carmine Galante in Brooklyn. It is noted that he was initiated alongside John Palazzolo; however, Cesare Bonventre and Baldo Amato were initiated during the same night. In 1978, he survived a car bombing. Coppa was known for his involvement in fraud and stock scams. He became a government witness in November 2002.
- Richard "Shellackhead" Cantarella – former capo. He was inducted into the Bonanno crime family in July 1990. He was involved in the 1982 murder of Anthony Mirra and the 1992 murder of Robert Perrino. In December 2002, Cantarella became a government informant after he was arrested on murder and racketeering charges in October 2002, in 2004, Cantarella testified at the trial of boss Joseph Massino, then in 2007, he testified at the trial of Vincent Basciano.
- Salvatore "Handsome Sal" Vitale – former underboss. In January 2003, Vitale was charged with the 1992 murder of Bonanno associate Robert Perrino. In April 2003, Vitale became a government informant. In July 2004, he testified at the trial of his brother-in-law, boss Joseph Massino. By 2010, Vitale had testified against 51 organized crime figures.
- James "Big Louie" Tartaglione – former capo. In 2003, Tartaglione began wearing a wire and recorded conversations with other Bonanno family members. In 2007, Tartaglione testified against Vincent Basciano and Patrick DeFilippo.
- Joseph "Joey Moak" D'Amico – former soldier. D'Amico was inducted into the Bonanno crime family in 1977 at Elizabeth Street, Little Italy. He served in the crew of his uncle, Bonanno capo Alfred "Al Walker" Embarrato. He was also an acquaintance of Sicilian hitman and Bonanno capo Cesare Bonventre, who can be seen together in several FBI surveillance photos. D'Amico murdered Anthony Mirra, his cousin and a Bonanno capo, on February 18, 1982, on orders of boss Joseph Massino as Mirra had allowed FBI agent Joseph Pistone, better known as Donnie Brasco, to infiltrate the family. Between January and March 2003, D'Amico decided to become a government informant.
- Frank "Curly" Lino – former capo. Lino became an informer in 2003 and testified at the trial for the 1981 murders of Bonanno capos Alphonse Indelicato, Philip Giaccone, and Dominick Trinchera. Lino then testified on the 1981 murder of Dominick Napolitano. Napolitano was killed by Bonanno family member Robert Lino Sr. (his cousin) and Ronald Filocomo.
- Duane "Goldie" Leisenheimer – a family associate and ally to Joseph Massino since the age of twelve. He joined the Massino hijacking crew and helped hide Massino in the 1980s. Leisenheimer was the lookout for the 1981 murder of three captains. In 2004, with Salvatore Vitale testifying against him, Leisenheimer turned informant against Massino.
- Joseph "Big Joe" Massino – former boss from the early 1990s until 2004. He was active since 1960 through his introduction by Salvatore Vitale, brother-in-law and future Bonanno underboss. He became a soldier during the late 1970s. Massino became the first official boss from New York to become an informant. While boss, Massino changed the Bonanno family from being the weakest family in New York City to one of the most powerful in the country. He teamed up with Gambino family boss John Gotti to reinstate the Bonanno family on the Mafia Commission, after the family was kicked off as a result of allowing FBI agent Joseph Pistone aka Donnie Brasco to meet former Florida crime family boss Santo Trafficante and several high-ranking members of the Bonanno organization. In the early 2000s, Massino was the strongest and most influential boss not in prison. In January 2003, Massino was charged with the 1981 murder of Bonanno capo Dominick Napolitano. Massino had Napolitano killed for admitting FBI agent Joseph D. Pistone (known as Donnie Brasco) to his crew. At his 2004 trial, over 70 witnesses testified against him and accused him of participating in four murders. Former U.S. Attorney General John Ashcroft accused him of ordering the murder of Bonanno capo and major heroin trafficker Gerlando Sciascia in 1999. In addition, he was suspected of participating in the murders of Bonanno capos Anthony Mirra in 1982 and also Sicilian hitman Cesare Bonventre in 1984, and hitman Gabriel Infanti. In 2004, Massino turned informant and testified against members of his own family to avoid the death penalty. In January 2005, Massino wore a wire to record conversations in prison with his acting boss Vincent Basciano.
- Michael "Sonny" Maggio – former soldier. He led an unofficial crew within the Bonanno family with Gino Galestro. It is noted that Maggio has ordered at least two murder contracts, including Robert McKelvey, a Bonanno associate who was stabbed and then drowned outside of the Kreischer Mansion in April 2005; the corpse was later dismembered and incinerated. Maggio was sentenced to six years' imprisonment in 2005 and released in 2011. He expressed during his imprisonment that he enjoyed painting pictures and sending them to his children; however, he was uncertain if his children received the paintings due to his sister's marriage to Galestro.
- Peter Rosa – former soldier. He allegedly committed the 1989 murder of Gerald Guarino. Rosa became a government informer by at least 2006.
- Dominick Cicale – former captain and was close to former family boss Vincent "Vinny Gorgeous" Basciano. He was suspected of participating in at least two murders, including the 2004 murder of Bonanno associate Randy Pizzolo. Before joining the Bonanno family, he murdered a drug dealer in Florida and served 11 years in prison. In 2007, Cicale became a government witness and testified against Basciano. He was released in 2013 after serving eight years in prison. In 2014, he asked Judge Richard J. Sullivan to show leniency towards Joseph Basciano, the son of former Bonanno acting boss Vincent Basciano, who had been convicted of selling marijuana; Sullivan had sentenced Basciano to six months in prison.
- Nicholas "P.J." Pisciotti – former acting capo. In 2007, Pisciotti assaulted several Genovese crime family associates in a Little Italy restaurant. When Piscotti learned that Bonanno mobsters Nicholas Santora and Anthony Rabito had given the Genovese family permission to kill him, Pisciotti became a government witness. In 2007, he testified against Vincent Basciano.
- Generoso "Jimmy the General" Barbieri – former soldier and acting capo. He became a government witness in 2011 and testified against Vincent Basciano, twice. Along with former boss Joseph Massino, he revealed Basciano's plot to murder Greg Andres, an attorney. He pled guilty to murder, racketeering, illegal gambling and loansharking, and was sentenced to time already served in 2013.
- Peter "Pug" Lovaglio – former soldier and capo based in Staten Island. In 2013, he pled guilty to three parole violations. He agreed to cooperate in 2015 after a serious assault inside of a sushi bar, he was sentenced to eight years in prison in March 2017 for the crime. In January 2018, Lovaglio testified against Philadelphia crime family boss Joey Merlino and recounted befriending Merlino in 2015.
- Eugene "Gene" Borrello - former associate, Borrello was arrested in 2014 for leading a violent Bonnano-associated home invasion ring in Howard Beach, Queens. While in custody, Borrello agreed to turn state's evidence in early 2016, testifying against several family members, including Vincent Asaro. In 2019, Borrello was sentenced to time served and released, where he became an author and started a podcast with John Alite. In February 2021, he was arrested for making violent threats towards an ex-girlfriend and her family.
- Thomas "Sharkey" Carrube – former soldier. In 1992, Carrube and James Galante were indicted for racketeering and bribery while working as foremen at the Metropolitan News Company. Carrube was inducted into the Bonanno family in 2014 in order to seek protection from Peter Lovaglio. Carrube declined a business proposal from Lovaglio, and was offered membership from then-consigliere Simone Esposito. During the dispute in family leadership between Mancuso and Cammanaro, Carrube witnessed most of the tension. In 2017, Carrube was approached by authorities and agreed to become an informant, taping conversations between family members.

=== Hearings ===
Bonanno crime family's Valachi hearings chart (1963)
Boss	Joseph Bonanno
Underboss	Carmine Galante
Consigliere	Frank Garafolo
Caporegimes	Joseph Notaro, other caporegimes unidentified
Soldiers	Michael Angelina, James Colletti, Michael Consolo, Rasario Dionosio, Nicholas Marangello, Frank Mari, John Petrone, Angelo Presinzano, Frank Presinzano, Phillip "Rusty" Rastelli, George Rizzo, Michael Sabella, Joseph Spadaro, Costenze Valente, Frank Valente, Nicholas Zapprana
See: GangRule.com – Family Charts: Bonanno family chart

== Factions and territories ==
The Bonanno family operates primarily in the New York City area, as well as in New Jersey, Pennsylvania, Arizona, Florida and California. The family engages in loansharking, illegal gambling, extortion, narcotics trafficking, pornography, hijacking, trafficking in stolen property, casino fraud, tax fraud, credit card fraud, and forgery.

- New York City – The family predominantly operates in Brooklyn, Queens, Staten Island and Long Island, with additional influence in Manhattan and the Bronx.
- New Jersey – The family operates in New Jersey, including in Atlantic City.
- Florida – The family operates in South Florida, including in Broward and Palm Beach counties.
- Arizona – The family operates in Tucson.
- California – The family operates in Northern California, including in San Francisco, San Jose and Sacramento.

=== Crews ===
==== Defunct ====
- Bath Avenue crew – a "farm team" that was run by Bonanno associate Paul Gulino supervised under consigliere Anthony Spero until Gulino got into an argument with Spero and shoved him. Spero then ordered Gulino's death and Gulino was murdered by two members of Gulino's own Bath Avenue crew, Joey Calco and Tommy Reynolds (Calco actually pulled the trigger). Fabrizio Defrancisci is the only one of the crew's former members that became a made man in the Bonanno family.
- Indelicato crew – was run by capo Joseph Indelicato. This crew was active in Manhattan and New Jersey. Indelicato's nephew Anthony "Bruno" Indelicato was initially a soldier in this crew.
- Knickerbocker Avenue crew, sometimes known as the Sicilian faction – a group of Sicilian-born Mafia members. The group operates from Bushwick, Brooklyn and Queens neighborhoods of Ridgewood, Glendale, Middle Village and Maspeth. In the 1950s, the Bonanno family began bringing Sicilian-born Mafia members to New York to form closer ties with the Sicilian Mafia families. American mobsters frequently refer to these Sicilian mobsters as Zips. The derogatory term name derives from their Sicilian birth and their fast-spoken, difficult-to-understand Sicilian dialects. In the late 1960s, Salvatore Catalano controlled the Sicilian faction running the family's heroin racket with Carmine Galante. Members of the Zip crew were two of Galante's most trusted bodyguards, cousins Cesare Bonventre and Baldo Amato.
- Motion Lounge crew – formerly run by capo Nicholas "Nicky Mouth" Santora until his death in 2018. This Brooklyn-based crew is active primarily in the Western Brooklyn communities of Williamsburg and East Williamsburg.
- The New Springville Boys – a "farm team" for the Bonanno and Colombo families based in the New Springville and Bulls Head neighborhoods of Staten Island. Members of the gang included Chris Paciello and Lee D'Avanzo. On December 6, 2001, eleven members of the New Springville Boys were indicted on charges of drug dealing, loan sharking, money laundering, home invasion robbery and bank robbery.
- The Ridgewood Boys, also known as the Ridgewood Juniors and the Giannini crew – A semi-independent Bonanno "farm team" supervised by Baldo Amato and based out of Caffé Giannini in Ridgewood, Queens.
- Rochester crew – The Bonanno family maintained an association with the Rochester crime family. When the Rochester family became defunct in the 1990s, some remnants of the Rochester Mafia, including Thomas "Tommy" Marotta joined the Bonanno family, while others, such as Rene Piccarreto, instead aligned with the Buffalo crime family.
- Tucson crew – Operating out of Tucson, Arizona, little information is known about the Arizona Crew formerly led by Salvatore Bonanno. It is highly likely that it is defunct.

=== Canadian factions ===
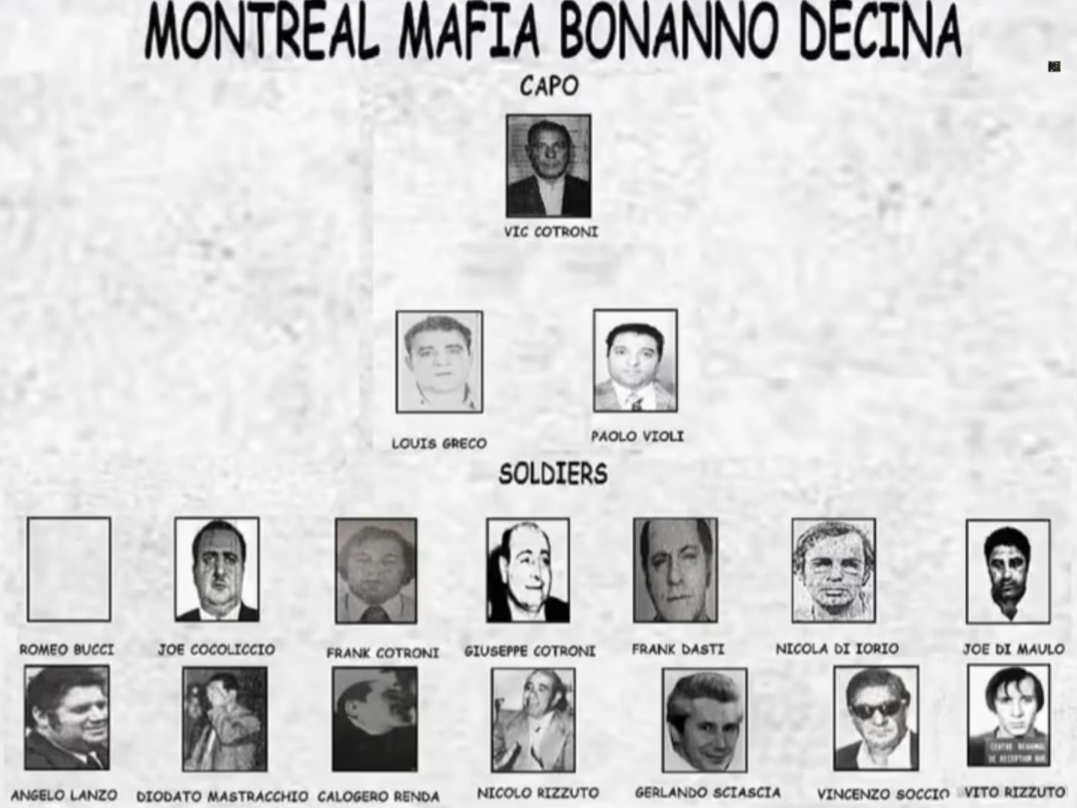
A 1940s Royal Canadian Mounted Police chart of the Bonanno crime family's crew (decina) in Montreal

In 1953, boss Joseph Bonanno sent Carmine Galante to Montreal, Quebec, Canada, to supervise the family drug business there, where he worked with the Calabrian Vincenzo Cotroni of the Cotroni family in the French Connection heroin smuggling scheme. Police also estimated that Galante was collecting gambling profits in Montreal worth about $50 million per year. In April 1956, due to Galante's strong-arm extortion tactics, the Canadian Government deported him back to the United States.

A Sicilian faction of the Cotroni family was led by Luigi Greco Greco until his death in 1972. Capodecina Paolo Violi complained about the independent modus operandi of his Sicilian "underlings", Nicolò Rizzuto in particular. As tensions grew into a power struggle between the Calabrian and Sicilian factions of the family, a mob war began in 1973. In 1977, Rizzuto and Violi met face-to-face in the home of a Montreal resident for a last-ditch effort to resolve their differences, according to a police report. But the peace talks failed, and most of the Rizzuto family fled to Venezuela.

The Sicilians killed Violi in 1978, his brothers, and others. With the death of Vincenzo Controni in 1984, from natural causes, the Rizzuto family became the most powerful Mafia family in Montreal. The FBI considers both the Cotronis and the Rizzutos to be factions of the Bonanno family, but Canadian law enforcement considers them to be independent organizations. The Rizzuto family is sometimes referred to as the Sixth Family.

In 1988, Nicolò Rizzuto was convicted of cocaine trafficking, and his son Vito Rizzuto became boss of the family. Vito Rizzuto was arrested in January 2004, and extradited to the United States on murder charges in August 2006. In May 2007, Rizzuto accepted a plea deal for his involvement in the May 1981 murders of three renegade Bonanno capos in New York, and was sentenced to 10 years in prison. During his time in prison, his son Nicolò Rizzuto Jr. was murdered on December 28, 2009, while his father Nicolo Rizzuto Sr. was murdered on November 10, 2010. He was released from prison on October 5, 2012, and subsequently died on December 23, 2013, from complications of lung cancer.

== List of murders committed by the Bonanno crime family ==
Name	Date	Reason
Carlo Simari	October 21, 1964	Bonanno faction soldier Simari was shot to death outside his Brooklyn home by a DiGregorio gunman during the "Banana War".
Joe Badalamonte	February 10, 1965	DiGregorio faction soldier Badalamonte was shot to death in Bay Ridge, Brooklyn.
John "Johnny Futto" Biello	March 17, 1967	60-year-old Biello, a Florida-based capo in the Genovese crime family, was killed on the orders of boss Joseph Bonanno after he revealed to the Commission Bonanno's plans to take over the Mafia's governing body. He was shot dead in his car in Miami Beach.
Vince "Jimmy Lefty" Cassese and Vince "Vinnie Carroll" Garofalo	October 25, 1967	Both were Bonanno loyalists and are shot in Brooklyn.
Gaetano "Smitty" D'Angelo, James "Jimmy D" D'Angelo and Frank "Frankie 500" Telleri	November 10, 1967	DiGregorio faction captains are killed by a machine gun inside the Cypress Gardens restaurant in Ridgewood, Queens.
Pietro "Skinny Pete" Crociata	March 4, 1968	DiGregorio faction underboss Crociata is shot while getting out of his car in Manhattan and turns to retirement from the crime family.
Salvatore "Big Hank" Perrone	March 11, 1968	Perrone was a bodyguard to Bill Bonanno, the son of Joseph Bonanno. Perrone is shot to death on a street in Brooklyn.
Mike "Bruno" Consolo	April 1, 1968	DiGregorio faction soldier is shot and killed after a court appearance while getting into his car in Brooklyn.
Billy Gonzales	April 5, 1968	Bonanno faction associate is shot to death outside his home in the Bronx.
Francisco "Frank Coffee" Crociata	April 17, 1968	DiGregorio faction soldier Crociata is shot and wounded in Brooklyn.
Frank "Frankie T" Mari and Michael "Mikey Adams" Adamo	September 18, 1968	DiGregorio underboss Mari and consigliere Adamo are considered dead after their disappearance from Brooklyn in late 1968
Tommy Zummo	February 5, 1969	future boss Joseph Massino shoots and kills Zummo in Queens.
Pietro "Pete" Licata	November 3, 1976	70-year-old Licata, a Bonanno capo and head of the family's Sicilian faction, was shotgunned outside his home in Middle Village, Queens. Licata, who opposed the heroin trade, was killed in order to allow the drug trafficker Salvatore "Toto" Catalano to take over the Sicilian group.
Frank Santoro	February 15, 2001	Santoro was an associate of the Colombo crime family. Santoro was shot to death with a shotgun blast whilst walking his dog in the Bronx for threatening to kidnap the son of former Bonanno family boss Vincent "Vinnie Gorgeous" Basciano.
Randy Pizzolo	November 30, 2004	Pizzolo was an associate of the Bonanno family. Pizzolo's murder was ordered by former Bonanno family boss Vincent Basciano and he was murdered by Anthony "Ace" Aiello. It is believed Pizzolo was shot to death for angering members of the Bonanno and Genovese families.
Anthony "Little Anthony" Seccafico	July 2, 2009	Seccafico served as a soldier for the Bonanno family. It is believed Seccafico was shot to death at a bus stop in Staten Island as a result of feuding with John "Johnny Joe" Spirito.
Salvatore "Sal the Ironworker" Montagna	November 24, 2011	Montagna served as acting boss of the Bonanno family during the late 2000s. Montagna was shot and killed in Canada possibly due to a gang war with the Rizzuto crime family and other criminal organisations.

== See also ==
- Crime in New York City
- Italians in New York City
- List of Italian Mafia crime families

== Sources ==
=== Books ===
- Alexander, Shana. The Pizza Connection: Lawyers, Drugs, Money, Mafia. New York: Weidenfeld & Nicolson, 1988.
- Blumenthal, Ralph. Last Days of the Sicilians. New York: Simon & Schuster (Pocket Books), 1988.
- Bonanno, Bill (1999). "Bound by Honor: A Mafioso's Story." New York: St Martin's Paperbacks
- Bonanno, Bill. Pistone, Joseph. (2008). "The Good Guys."
- Bonanno, Joe (1983). A Man of Honor: The Autobiography of Joseph Bonanno. New York: St Martin's Paperbacks. ISBN 0-312-97923-1
- Crittle, Simon. The Last Godfather: The Rise & Fall of Joey Massino. New York: Berkley Books, 2006.
- DeStefano, Anthony. King of the Godfathers: Joseph Massino and the Fall of the Bonanno Crime Family. New York: Pinnacle Books, 2006. ISBN 0-7860-1893-3
- DeStefano, Anthony. The Last Godfather: Joey Massino & the Fall of the Bonanno Crime Family. California: Citadel, 2006.
- Edwards, Peter. The Northern Connection: Inside Canada's Deadliest Mafia Family. Canada: Optimum International, 2006.
- Humphreys, Adrian & Lamothe, Lee. The Sixth Family: The Collapse of the New York Mafia & the Rise of Vito Rizzuto. Canada: Wiley, 2006.
- Nicaso, Antonio & Lamothe, Lee. Bloodlines: The Rise & Fall of the Mafia's Royal Family. Canada: HarperCollins, 2001.
- Pistone, Joseph D.; & Woodley, Richard (1999) Donnie Brasco: My Undercover Life in the Mafia, Hodder & Stoughton. ISBN 0-340-66637-4.
- Pistone, Joseph D. (2004). The Way of the Wiseguy, Running Press. ISBN 0-7624-1839-7.
- Pistone, Joseph D.; & Brandt, Charles (2007). Donnie Brasco: Unfinished Business, Running Press. ISBN 0-7624-2707-8.
- Raab, Selwyn. The Five Families: The Rise, Decline & Resurgence of America's Most Powerful Mafia Empire. New York: St. Martins Press, 2005.
- Sterling, Claire. Octopus: How the Long Reach of the Sicilian Mafia Controls The global Narcotics Trade. New York: Simon & Schuster (Touchstone), 1990.
- Stille, Alexander. Excellent Cadavers: The Mafia & the Death of the First Italian Republic. New York: Random House, 1995.
- Talese, Gay (1971). Honor Thy Father. Cleveland: World Publishing Company. ISBN 0-8041-9980-9

=== Reports ===
- Thurmond, Strom (1988). Organized Crime in America (PDF) (Report). National Institute of Justice – via United States Department of Justice.
- Zazzali, James R. (September 1990). 21st Annual Report (PDF) (Report). State of New Jersey Commission of Investigation – via Government of New Jersey.
- Schiller, Francis E. (May 2004). The Changing Face of Organize Crime in New Jersey (PDF) (Report). State of New Jersey Commission of Investigation – via Government of New Jersey.
