= Francesco Domingo =

Sicilian mafia boss

- Mugshot of Francesco Domingo
- Born: 1956 (age 69–70); Castellammare del Golfo, Sicily, Italy
- Other name: Tempesta ("Storm")
- Occupation: Mafia boss
- Status: Imprisoned since 2020
- Allegiance: Castellammarese Mafia family / Sicilian Mafia

Francesco Domingo (born 1956) is a member of the Sicilian Mafia and the boss of the Castellammare del Golfo Mafia family, which in turn belongs to the mandamento of Alcamo. Domingo was allegedly very close to Matteo Messina Denaro.

== History ==
Francesco Domingo assumed the leadership of the Castellammare del Golfo Mafia family in the 1990s, which in the meantime was decimated by numerous arrests, Domingo in turn was arrested in November 2001, accused of Mafia association. Francesco Domingo was then again tried and sentenced to over nineteen years of imprisonment for leading the Castellammare's mafia, in the process that resulted from the operation known as Tempesta, Domingo's nickname in the underworld.

According to the investigators, the boss, even during his detention, had maintained the regency of the mafia family, directly managing the extortion to companies from the prison and receiving the proceeds to be poured into the "cash" of the association, and this through collaboration of his wife Antonella Di Graziano. Released from prison in 2016, Francesco Domingo was subjected to the preventive measure of the special public security surveillance with the obligation to stay in the Municipality of Castellammare.

Domingo has a particular inclination to violence, which has always characterized his conduct in the organization. It is precisely because of these characteristics and the extremely dangerous criminal profile of the boss that, at the time of his release, the investigative activity against him was started, appearing highly likely that Domingo, returned to freedom, would again acquire control of the mafia family. The Castellammare family was dedicated to the control of economic activities through intimidation and extortion against building and agricultural entrepreneurs. Domingo was also the contact person for the resolution of disputes within the clan.

According to various investigations, the boss has maintained close relations with the branches of the Cosa Nostra in the United States, in particular with the Bonannos, in fact, the affiliates of the New York family made numerous visits to Domingo's villa, in the Gagliardetta district. And they would also ask Domingo for authorization to speak with other exponents of the Alcamo's mandamento, as well as conveyed messages between Domingo and his associates in the United States.

Francesco Domingo was arrested in June 2020, along with 12 other members of the Castellammare Mafia.
