= Tiffany Fong =

American influencer

Tiffany Fong is an American social media influencer covering cryptocurrency.

She became known after she posted about her losses during the decline of Celsius Network. Her posts gained widespread views and Celsius employees began sending her documents and audio from private meetings. Her posts drew the attention of Sam Bankman-Fried. She interviewed him extensively during his house arrest after the collapse of FTX.

== Elon Musk offer ==
An April 2025 report from The Wall Street Journal stated that Elon Musk asked Tiffany Fong to have a child with him, although they had never met in person. According to the Journal, Fong declined the proposal, reportedly telling confidante Ashley St. Clair, an influencer who had a child with Musk, that she envisioned having children within a more traditional family structure.

The Journal also reported that Fong expressed concern that refusing Musk's proposal could negatively affect her earnings from X (formerly Twitter), Musk's social media platform. The report indicated that her earnings on the platform decreased after Musk unfollowed her and admonished her for disclosing his request to others.

Contacted by The Independent, Fong stated that she "did not feed this story" to the Wall Street Journal and "would have rather kept it private." Fong also publicly posted on X that she had explicitly asked not to be included in the Journal story when contacted for comment and would not be commenting publicly on the matter.
