= Bonventre =

Bonventre is an Italian surname. Notable people with the surname include:

- Cesare Bonventre (1951–1984), Italian mobster
- Daniel Bonventre (born c. 1944), American money manager
- Giovanni Bonventre (1901 – 1970s?), American mobster
- Vincent Martin Bonventre (born 1948), American law professor
- Vito Bonventre (1875–1930), American mobster
