= Robert Perrino =

American murder victim

Robert Francis Perrino, also known as "Bobby Perrino" (February 9, 1938 in Fordham, Bronx – May 4, 1992 in Port Richmond, Staten Island) was the superintendent of deliveries at the New York Post from the 1970s until 1992, when he was murdered. He was a Bonanno crime family associate of Italian-American descent. Perrino was the leader of "The Post Circulation Crew" (as referred to by Manhattan District Attorney Robert Morgenthau in court) which allegedly existed to control the circulation department of (the now defunct) New York Post printing press and distribution center (located at 210 South Street) by means of extortion, coercion, the falsification of business records, larceny and bribery. The crew also became involved in loan sharking, drug trafficking and the selling of stolen firearms.

== Biography ==
Robert Perrino was the son-in-law of Bonanno crime family underboss and former consigliere Nicholas Marangello. He was born to American born parents of Italian immigrants from Gallo Matese, Italy, and not to be mistaken as a relative of Anthony Peraino. Perrino was a former New York Police Department (NYPD) law enforcement officer policing the Little Italy, Manhattan neighborhood during an unremarkable twenty-year career. His retirement from the NYPD and introduction to his subsequent career in organized crime remains a mystery to authorities. Perrino lived in Knickerbocker Village in Two Bridges, Manhattan, where his father-in-law Nicholas Marangello and other members of the Bonanno crime family resided. He maintained daily contact and worked alongside other crime family members at the New York Post, a mere three blocks away from his home. Perrino was hired in the late 1960s as the Superintendent of Deliveries for the New York Post to replace Bonanno crime family mobster Anthony Michele. Later, he moved from Knickerbocker Village to a waterfront mansion on Huntington Bay in Huntington, New York with his wife and children.

After his disappearance, police discovered in his Huntington home a stunning arsenal of firearms, including some with erased serial numbers, plus $105,000 in loose currency. Months following his disappearance, Perrino's picture was broadcast on the television show America's Most Wanted, but the show elicited no tips. Law enforcement officials and most Newspaper and Mail Deliverers Union (NMDU) workers assumed Perrino had been murdered. He was declared legally dead in 1997.

== The Post Circulation Crew ==
The Post Circulation Crew was formed in the early 1960s before Perrino was hired at The Post by Albert Embarrato to replace Anthony Michele, another Post Circulation Crew member who had been promoted to Director of Circulation. Perrino led a double life as a powerful and influential associate of the Bonanno crime family for twenty years, unknown to his fellow "citizen" employees and family members. During his employment, Perrino allowed the New York Post labor force to be infested with button-men, or "sidewalk soldiers", from the Bonanno crime family. The Post Circulation Crew included three "made" soldiers: Richard Cantarella, Joseph D'Amico and Albert Embarrato. They among other members of the Bonanno crime family were all employed by The Post and received wages, some of which amounted to $50,000 a year. An estimated 51 crime family members were no-show employees while others were partially or wholly present at the newspaper distribution plant including Cantarella, D'Amico and Embarrato.

For years, through the influence of Joseph Massino and Salvatore Vitale, Perrino while leading The Post Circulation Crew organized the theft of thousands of newspapers every day and sold them to non-connected independent street vendors and stores in Manhattan and Staten Island at a rate of twenty to thirty cents each; the standard newspaper price at the time was fifty cents. Although Perrino helped the Bonanno crime family orchestrate many rackets at the newspaper they demonstrated no interest in the actual content that was printed by The Post and did not control its content.

With Perrino's help the Bonanno crime family became entrenched at the newspaper – the mobsters organized loan shark operations to employees, sold small quantities of stolen firearms, ammunition and drugs. Perrino collected the loan shark debts by threatening his indebted employees with chukka sticks. While the Bonanno crime family operation prospered under Perrino, the New York State Marshals began probing La Cosa Nostra infiltration of the New York Post and Perrino became the main target and focal point of a labor racketeering probe brought on by Manhattan District Attorney Robert Morgenthau. As the investigation came to show promise, the U.S. Marshals planted a transmitter in Perrino's office at the distribution plant.

While Perrino was Superintendent of Distribution, he employed The Post Circulation Crew that consisted of truck drivers, Richard Cantarella, Paul Cantarella, Frank Cantarella, Joseph D'Amico, Albert Embarrato, Vincent DiSario, Gerard Bilboa, Anthony Vitale, Douglas LaChance (former NMDU president), Anthony Turzio, John Vispisiano (NMDU business agent for the New York Post), Michael Diana (NMDU business agent), John Nobile, Armando DiCostanzo, Leo D'Angelo (general foreman at Metropolitan News Company), James Galante, John Piervencenti (assistant foreman), Thomas Carrube (assistant foreman), Michael Alvino (NMDU President from 1989 to 1991), Joe Torre (Citiwide News Corporation business agent), Anthony Michele (Director of Circulation), Gerard Bilboa (newspaper foreman), Corey Ellenthal (newspaper foreman), Michael Fago (newspaper foreman), and for a short period of time, Salvatore Vitale's youngest son, and Anthony Vitale who worked as a delivery truck drivers.

== Relationship with the Mafia ==
Richard Cantarella and Robert Perrino spoke freely in his office about racketeering matters. He was also a close friend of Bonanno crime family capo Albert Embarrato. A wire transmitter in Perrino's office caught saying to Richard Cantarella, as reported in The Village Voice's article "The Newspaper Racket: Tough Guys and Wiseguys in the Truck Drivers Union", "Al Walker's the smartest guy in the whole Bonanno family, and he's the toughest fuckin' guy".

Perrino was in regular contact with Bonanno crime family underboss Salvatore Vitale to whom he handed over the weekly proceeds from their racketeering ventures. When law enforcement finally came down on the newspaper's crooked workforce, Perrino was not arrested or indicted although Bonanno crime family members and several others were caught in the sting operation – making Salvatore Vitale nervous. A secret video camera placed in Perrino's office in late 1991 caught Perrino discussing his important role in the Bonanno crime family. It also taped Perrino and other Post employees discussing the finer points of bootlegging, newspaper theft and passing around loaded pistols to admire. Perrino was heard advising truck drivers, "It's bad to carry a fuckin' piece in the car, you'll have to shoot everybody", as reported in "The Newspaper Racket: Tough Guys and Wiseguys in the Truck Drivers Union" in The Village Voice. Although Salvatore Vitale had not been named in the initial indictments, he thought that Perrino could become an informant because of his immense involvement with the rackets at the New York Post. Perrino's father-in-law, Nicholas Marangello, was incarcerated for racketeering as a result of the Donnie Brasco investigation at the time of his execution. Two of Perrino's executive co-workers, including his friend Director of Circulation, Anthony Michele, pleaded guilty to racketeering. A number of Bonanno crime family connected members of the Newspaper Mail Deliverer's Union later pleaded guilty to a variety of charges and were imprisoned at Riker's Island. Salvatore Vitale suggested that Richard Cantarella replace Perrino shortly before the racketeering investigation was revealed.

== Botched execution ==
Richard Cantarella told Perrino that he needed to attend a meeting and discuss the case against the Bonanno crime family and the investigation of their infiltration of the New York Post. He accompanied Michael "Mickey Bats" Cardella to a Bensonhurst, Brooklyn, social club owned by Bonanno mob associate Anthony Basile, a relative of Long Island discothèque owner and Lucchese crime family associate Phillip Basile.

As Perrino entered the club, Baldassare Amato, waiting inside the social club, shot Perrino several times in the back of the skull and immediately left with Cardello. Frank Lino was then notified of the completion of the execution and sent over a "clean up team" that consisted of his cousin Robert Lino, Frank Ambrosiano and Anthony Basile. Upon entering the club, the trio were shocked to discover that Perrino was still alive, and one of the team stabbed Perrino to death with an ice pick to the chest. Frank Lino, angered at the botched execution, would later tell Salvatore Vitale in Joey Massino: The Rise and Fall of the Last Godfather, "Tell the guy that did the shooting to make sure that next time that the victim was dead". Perrino's car was later recovered nearby with a parking ticket in the windshield.

According to The Last Godfather, the men wrapped Perrino's corpse in a carpet and drove to a construction company, Commercial Brick, located at 98 Jewett Avenue in Port Richmond, Staten Island owned by Anthony Basile and buried him underneath the cement floor of the store. Several weeks later, one of his limbs was said to have risen up from the floor, making the mobsters dig a deeper grave. Years later, Anthony Basile was indicted on drug trafficking charges; Salvatore Vitale and Joseph Massino feared Anthony would become an informant and reveal Perrino's gravesite. His remains were removed from the cement floor and buried again.

== The New York Post labor racketeering investigation ==
After the disappearance and later confirmed murder of Perrino, only a handful of Bonanno crime family members and associates involved in the News and Mail Deliverer's Union were incarcerated for racketeering at Riker's Island. Many of those convicted in the Robert Morgenthau probe went back to work at the New York Post, some elevated to management positions following their release. Albert Embarrato was recruited as a potential partner by former New York Post owner Steve Hoffenberg. Bonanno crime family mobster Armond DiCostanzo went on disability leave from the newspaper, but his allies retained influence when The Daily News moved its plant to Jersey City, where Douglas LaChance, a close friend of Perrino and Albert Embarrato was named circulation manager.

Perrino's body remained hidden until December 2003, when his skeleton was found embedded in the concrete floor of the construction company. He had been shot multiple times in the head. Richard Cantarella, Frank Ambrosiano, Baldassare Amato, Frank Lino and Robert Cardello were all convicted of the murder. Bonanno crime family don Joseph Massino was not indicted for involvement in Perrino's murder because he was in prison at the time. At the trial, Perrino's daughter, Nicola Langora, testified that on the night Perrino disappeared, that she ate pizza at their home and watched the movie All Dogs Go To Heaven on television with his granddaughter. "I asked him why he was in a hurry, and he said he had to meet somebody in Brooklyn", Langora testified, "I asked him who he had to meet, and joking around he said, 'What's the matter-are you writing a book?'" That was the last time she saw her father.

== Hit men convicted ==
After an eight-week trial on October 27, 2006, Bonanno crime family capo Baldassare Amato, a cousin of Bonanno crime family capo Cesare Bonventre, and Bonanno crime family mob associates Stephen Locurto and Anthony Basile, were convicted of murdering Robert Perrino, Joseph Platia and Sebastiano DiFalco along with Racketeer Influenced and Corrupt Organizations Act charges. The government's case was tried by Assistant U.S. District Attorneys John Buretta, Jeffrey A. Goldberg and Andrea Goldbarg.

== Trivia ==
After Perrino was indicted for fraud and racketeering, he was represented by the criminal attorney Matthew Marie. In 2004, Marie would represent Richard Cantarella, one of Perrino's accused executioners. During the Perrino murder trial Marie argued that his client had nothing to do with Perrino's murder – Cantarella was found not guilty.

== Discrepancies in articles ==
Perrino is wrongfully labeled as being the son of former Bonanno crime family underboss Nicholas Marangello in The Last Godfather: The Rise and Fall of Joey Massino and several online articles, when this is impossible, Marangello and Perrino having two different last names. In Simon Crittle's book, he also mistakenly changes Perrino's name to "Anthony Perrino". Perrino is sometimes labeled as a mobster with the Bonanno crime family, which is false because of his history working with law enforcement.
