= Zips =

Slang term used by Italian American mobsters

Zips (also Siggies or Geeps) is a slang term in the United States that was especially in use in the mid-20th century. It was often used as a derogatory slur by Italian-American mobsters in reference to newer immigrant Sicilian mafiosi. The mobsters in the US were said to have difficulty understanding the Sicilian dialects of the new immigrants, in which words appeared to "zip" by. Other theories include pejorative uses, such as Sicilians' preference for homemade zip guns. According to another theory, the term is a contraction of a Sicilian slang term for "hicks" or "primitives".

== Arrival in the United States ==
With increasing violence and government presence in Italy, Sicilians found positions in the growing drug trafficking market of New York City's Five Families in the mid-20th century. The Pizza Connection, a heroin-trafficking operation involving Salvatore Catalano, a capo of the Bonanno crime family, and Gaetano Badalamenti, a Sicilian mafioso, was largely organized by Zips. The Zips were effective because they were unknown in the United States and had no police records. They generally congregated in the Knickerbocker Avenue area.

The younger Sicilian mafiosi became known for their reckless and undisciplined behavior, which gained unwanted attention for New York's homegrown crime families. The Zips had no qualms about murdering people who had been considered off-limits by the American Mafia, such as police officers, judges, and women and children. They were also known for using bombs to kill their targets. Although bombings were commonly used by the Sicilian Mafia, American mafiosi have usually shied away from bombs out of concern that they could put innocent people at risk. Zips were also known to have killed enemies who were already on their deathbeds. In the Sicilian Mafia, when someone is marked for death, that person cannot be allowed to die of natural causes.

The group was tolerated because they earned millions of dollars for the families, specifically the Bonanno and Gambino families. Both Carmine Galante and Carlo Gambino used zips for drug-running and contract killing. Galante's two personal bodyguards, Cesare Bonventre and Baldo Amato, were Zips.

Many Italian-American mobsters distrusted the Zips. Bonanno soldier Benjamin "Lefty" Ruggiero explained in a conversation to undercover FBI agent Joseph "Donnie Brasco" Pistone:

"Lots of people hate him [Galante]... There's only a few people he's close to. And that's mainly the Zips... Those guys are always with him. He brought them over from Sicily, and he uses them for different pieces of work and for dealing all that junk [drugs]. They're as mean as he is. You can't trust those bastard Zips. Nobody can. Except the Old Man."

On another occasion, Ruggiero told Pistone, "They hate the American people. They hate the American wiseguys". Bonanno soldier Anthony Mirra told Pistone, "The Zips are clannish and secretive. They are the meanest killers in the business".

== See also ==
- Fresh off the boat
