= Peter Rhodes =

Peter Rhodes may refer to:

- Peter C. Rhodes (1909–1965), American journalist
- Peter J. Rhodes (1940–2021), British ancient historian
