= Magaddino =

Magaddino may refer to:

- Stefano Magaddino, Italian-American mobster in the Buffalo crime family
- Peter Magaddino, American mobster in the Buffalo crime family, son of Stefano Magaddino

== See also ==
- Buffalo crime family, also known as the Magaddino crime family
