= William Malconvenant =

William Malconvenant also known as William Malcovenant (French: Guillaume Malconvenant, Latin: Guillelmus Malconvenant, Arabic: Ghuliyalm Malqumanant:, Italian: Guglielmo Malconvenant) (floruit 1183–1203), was an Italo-Norman baron in Sicily. He was an amiratus (admiral) of the Kingdom of Sicily in the late 12th and early 13th centuries, during the reign of the Hohenstaufen dynasty.

His family, the Malconvenant, originated in Coutances (Normandy), was one of the oldest Norman baronial families in Sicily. William's grandfather seems to have taken part in the conquest of Sicily and, in the division of the spoils, c. 1095, to have been granted the barony of Calatrasi, near Roccamena.

William Malconvenant received the title of amiratus after having served William II of Sicily as regie magne curie magister justiciarius at least from May 1183 through January 1186.

== Sources ==
- Ménager, Léon-Robert. Inventaire des familles normandes et franques émigrées en Italie méridionale et en Sicile (XIe-XIIe siècles). In: Roberto il Guiscardo e ilsuo tempo, Atti delle prime giornate normanno-sveve (Bari, 1973), Bari, Edizione Dedalo, 1975.
- Ménager, Léon-Robert. Amiratus, S.E.V.P.E.N., 1960.
- Ménager, Léon-Robert. Hommes et institutions de l'Italie normande, Variorum Reprints, 1958.
- Johns, Jeremy. Arabic administration in Norman Sicily: the royal dīwān, Cambridge University Press, 2002.
- Takayama, Hiroshi. The administration of the Norman kingdom of Sicily, E.J. Brill, 1993.
