= Nicolo Schiro =

Italian-American mobster

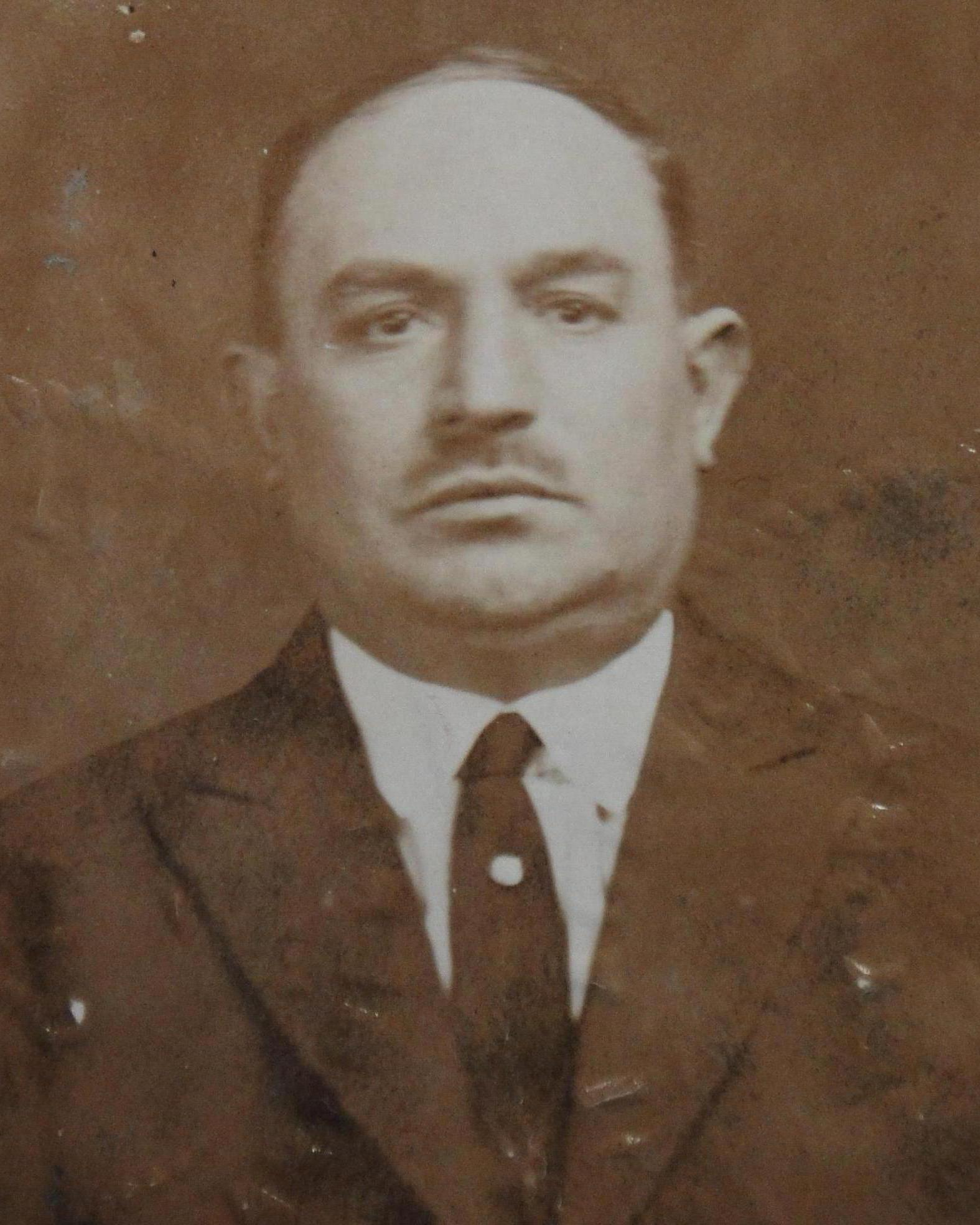
- Schiro, 1923
- Born: Nicolò Schirò; September 2, 1872; Roccamena, Sicily, Kingdom of Italy
- Died: April 29, 1957 (aged 84); Camporeale, Sicily, Italy
- Other names: "Cola", Nicola Schiro
- Occupations: Crime boss, mobster, yeast dealer
- Predecessor: Sebastiano DiGaetano
- Successor: Salvatore Maranzano
- Allegiance: Schiro crime family

Nicolo "Cola" Schiro (born Nicolò Schirò; (Note: His first name is also sometimes written as Nicola.) Italian pronunciation: [nikoˈlɔ skiˈrɔ]; September 2, 1872 – April 29, 1957) was an early Sicilian-born New York City mobster who, in 1912, became the boss of what later become known as the Bonanno crime family.

Schiro's leadership of the mafia clan would see it orchestrate the "Good Killers" murders, control gambling and protection rackets in Brooklyn, engage in bootlegging during Prohibition, and print counterfeit money.

A conflict with rival mafia boss Joe Masseria would force Schiro out as boss, after which he returned to Sicily.

== Early life ==
Nicolò Schirò was born on September 2, 1872, in the town of Roccamena, in the Province of Palermo, Sicily to Matteo Schirò and his wife, Maria Antonia Rizzuto. His father's family came from the Arbëreshë community of Contessa Entellina. Although born in Roccamena, Schiro grew up in his mother's hometown of Camporeale.

Schiro immigrated to the United States in 1902, settling in the Williamsburg section of Brooklyn.

In April 1905, Schiro was arrested for operating a butcher shop on a Sunday contrary to New York's Blue laws. He would later become a yeast salesman and broker.

== Mafia boss ==
Schiro became the new head of the local mafia centered in Williamsburg in March 1912, replacing Sebastiano DiGaetano.

Secret Service informant Salvatore Clemente reported in November 1913 that Schiro was aligned with the Morello crime family in a war against fellow New York mafia boss, and capo dei capi, Salvatore D'Aquila. Schiro later developed a more neutral stance, siding with neither D'Aquila's nor the Morello mafia clans.

Schiro's gang ran the Williamsburg area numbers gambling racket while extorting local Italian immigrants through Black Hand and protection rackets. If their extortion money was not paid, the victims' homes or businesses could be vandalized or destroyed.

Schiro ran his mafia clan conservatively, conducting its criminal activity primarily among the Sicilian immigrant community. He was never arrested during his time as boss, avoiding attention from authorities and the media.

Schiro developed close relationships with local business and political leaders and was on the board of directors of the local United Italian-American Democratic Club.

Schiro's first application for United States citizenship was rejected in 1913 due to his "lack of knowledge of the US Constitution". He later successfully naturalized as an American citizen in 1914.

In 1919, the Bureau of Investigation reviewed a list of Black Hand suspects in southern Colorado compiled by the sheriff of Huerfano County. On the list of names was Schiro gangster Frank Lanza, with the sheriff writing that Lanza had arrived in Colorado from New York "every May pretending to buy cheese but comes to organize Black-handers".

== "The Good Killers" ==
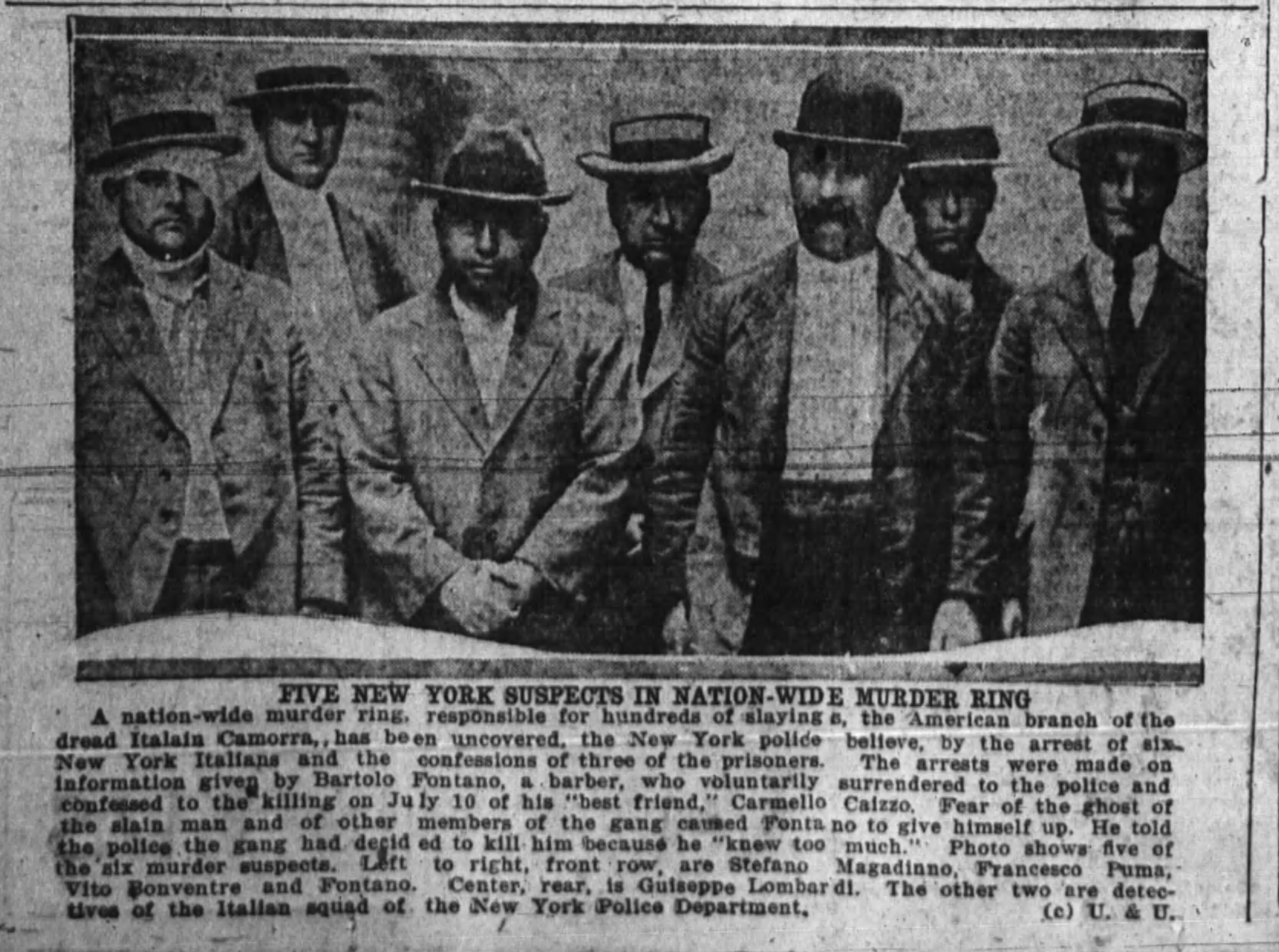
"Good Killers" suspects in police custody, 1921. Left to right, front row: Stefano Magaddino, Francisco Puma, Vito Bonventre and Bartolo Fontana.

=== 1917 Detroit shootings ===
In March 1917, Schiro gangster Stefano Magaddino orchestrated the murder of Detroit gangster Felice Buccellato due to Magaddino's mafia clan feuding with the mafia clan of the Buccellatos back in their hometown of Castellammare del Golfo.

Magaddino and Schiro were also determined to kill Felice's brother, fellow Detroit gangster Giuseppe Buccellato. Unable to find him, they decided to target other Buccellato family members. Giuseppe's cousin, Pietro Buccellato, worked at the Ford Motor Company factory in Highland Park, Michigan and Schiro arranged with Detroit mafia boss Tony Giannola to have him murdered.

On December 8, 1917, a Romanian autoworker named Joseph Constantin, who was mistaken for Pietro Buccellato, was shot and wounded.

On December 19, Paul Mutruc, another Romanian autoworker in Detroit, was mistaken for Pietro Buccellato. He was shot several times in the back and then shot twice in the head, killing him.

On December 22, as Pietro Buccellato waited with other passengers to board an approaching trolley, two gunmen fired multiple shots into him. An errant shot through one of the trolley windows nearly hit a passenger. Buccellato survived long enough to be taken to a hospital where he told police, before dying, he was attacked "on account of his cousin".

=== Fontana testimony ===
In August 1921, a barber named Bartolo Fontana turned himself into the New York police, confessing to a murder a couple of weeks prior in New Jersey.

Fontana claimed he murdered Camillo Caiozzo at the behest of the "Good Killers", a group of leading mafiosi in the Schiro gang who hailed from Castellammare del Golfo, in retaliation for Caiozzo's involvement in the 1916 murder of Stefano Magaddino's brother, Pietro Magaddino, back in Sicily. Fontana, fearing he might be murdered by them, agreed to help police set up a sting operation. Stefano Magaddino met Fontana at Grand Central Station to give Fontana $30 (Note: Approximately $470 in 2021 U.S. dollars.) to help him flee the city. After the exchange, Magaddino was arrested by a group of undercover police. Vito Bonventre, Francesco Puma and three other gangsters were subsequently arrested for their involvement in the murder.

Fontana revealed that the "Good Killers" were also responsible for a string of other murders. Some of the victims were connected to the Buccellato mafia clan in Castellammere del Golfo, while others had complained after being cheated in gambling rackets run by the Schiro gang.

Charges against Magaddino and Bonventre were dropped despite the New York police officers' testimony about the sting linking Magaddino to the murder. Francesco Puma was murdered on a New York street while out on bail awaiting trial, with a stray bullet from the shooting also hitting a seven-year-old girl. Fontana went to prison for Caiozzo's murder with no other convictions in the case. Magaddino fled New York City after his release, ending up in the Buffalo, New York area.

== 1920s and Prohibition ==
Several Schiro gangsters became mafia bosses in other cities – Frank Lanza in San Francisco, Stefano Magaddino in Buffalo, and Gaspare Messina in New England. Schiro was also close to future Los Angeles boss, Nick Licata.

In April 1921, Schiro admitted Nicola Gentile into his gang in order to protect Gentile from capo dei capi Salvatore D'Aquila as a show of Schiro's independence from D'Aquila.

Schiro gangster, Giovanni Battista Dibella (Note: Giovanni Battista Dibella was a brother of John Dibella (Giovanni Vincenzo Dibella), a business partner and crony of Schiro successor Joseph Bonanno.) was arrested (under the alias Piazza) on July 14, 1921, when over $100,000 (Note: Approximately $1.6 million in 2021 U.S. dollars.) worth of whiskey and numerous forged medicinal liquor permits were seized during a raid by Prohibition agents Izzy Einstein and Moe Smith at Dibella's olive oil warehouse in Brooklyn. Schiro had been a witness at Dibella's wedding in 1912.

=== Counterfeit money ===
On August 2, 1922, Secret Service agents arrested Schiro gangster Benjamin Gallo, along with four others, for operating a sophisticated counterfeiting plant at a bakery on Rockaway Avenue in Brooklyn. There agents found dyes, presses, paper, and hundreds of dollars' worth of counterfeit $5, $10, and $20 bills, along with an illicit alcohol still.

=== Bootlegging and immigration fraud ===
Future boss Joseph Bonanno illegally immigrated to the U.S. during the mid-1920s, soon joining the Schiro gang as a protege of Salvatore Maranzano. In his autobiography, Bonanno writes he thought Schiro was "a compliant fellow with little backbone" and "extremely reluctant to ruffle anyone". Bonanno's second cousin, Vito Bonventre, remained a leader within Schiro's gang following his arrest and release during the "Good Killers" affair. During Prohibition, Bonventre developed a widespread bootlegging operation with Bonanno recalling "Next to Schiro, Bonventre was probably the most wealthy" of the crime family.

Maranzano, a Castellammare del Golfo-born son-in-law of a Sicilian mafia boss in Trapani, had joined the Schiro mafia clan in the mid-1920s and helped it create an extensive bootlegging network in Dutchess County, New York, along with a ring providing fraudulent immigration and naturalization documents to Italians smuggled into the United States.

== Ouster and return to Sicily ==
Between 1923 and 1928, Schiro felt secure enough in his position as boss to make three trips to Europe.

Salvatore D'Aquila was murdered on October 10, 1928. Fellow New York boss Joe Masseria was selected to replace D'Aquila as the new capo dei capi. Following his elevation, Masseria began demanding monetary tributes from other mafia clans.

Schiro attended the January 1929 wedding of the son of San Francisco boss Frank Lanza in Los Angeles. He provoked Masseria's ire after warning Lanza of a mafia plot to kidnap him.

In 1930, Masseria demanded Schiro pay $10,000 (Note: Approximately $163,000 in 2021 U.S. dollars.) and step down as boss of his mafia crime family in order to spare his life. After being forced out, Schiro returned to his hometown of Camporeale, Sicily.

Judicial summons for Schiro and other officers of the Masterbilt Housing Corporation were published in Brooklyn newspapers in the fall of 1931.

In 1934, a memorial was dedicated in Camporeale to its soldiers killed during World War I. It was built from donations collected by Schiro from Camporealese immigrants in America.

Schiro was stripped of his U.S. citizenship following a request by the American consulate in Palermo on October 14, 1949. He died in Camporeale on April 29, 1957.

== See also ==
- Castellammarese War
- Crime in New York City

== Notes ==
American Mafia
| Preceded by Sebastiano DiGaetano | Bonanno crime family Boss; 1912–1930 | Succeeded by Salvatore Maranzano |
