= Knickerbocker Village =

Housing development in Manhattan, New York

Coordinates: 40.71150°N 73.99440°W

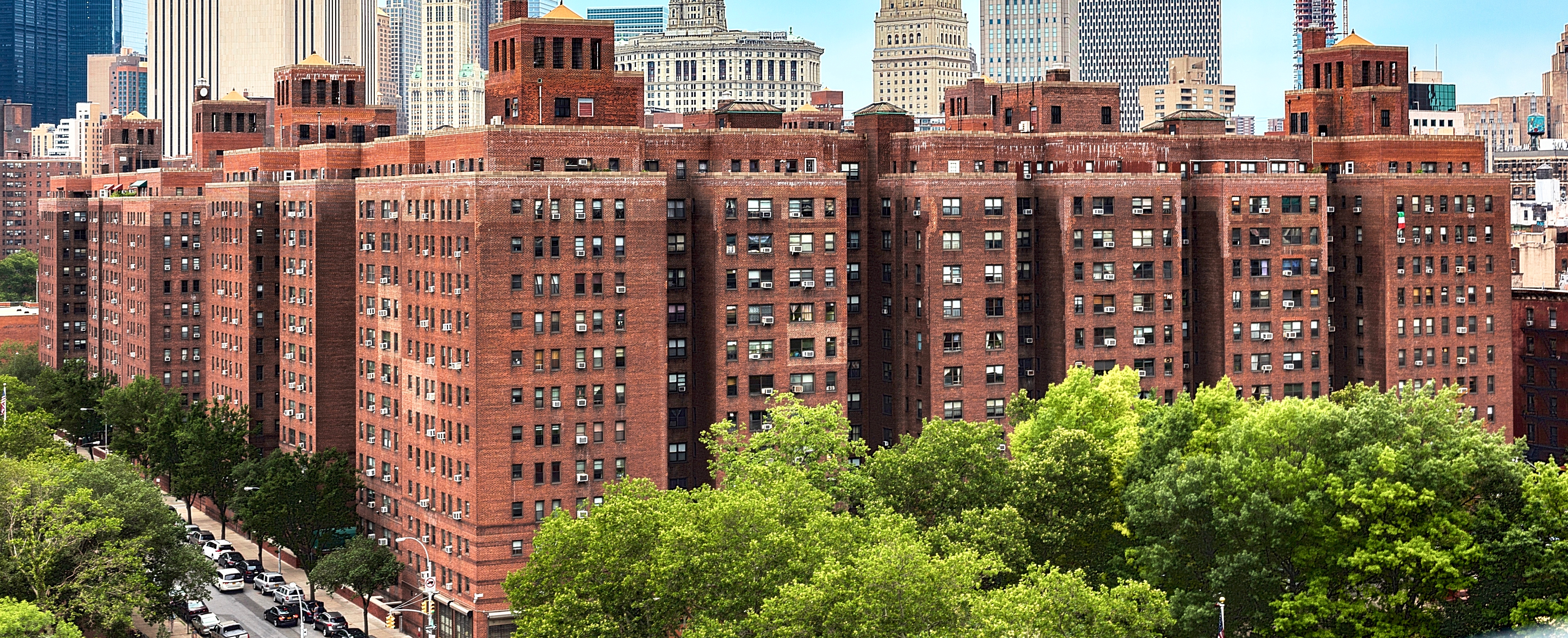
Knickerbocker Village

Knickerbocker Village Limited is a housing development in Manhattan, New York City. It is situated between the Manhattan Bridge and Brooklyn Bridge, in the Two Bridges section of the Lower East Side. Although the location was generally considered to fall on the Lower East Side, it has come to be thought of as part of Chinatown in recent years and the majority of residents are Chinese American. It is located a short distance from New York City Hall, Civic Center, and the South Street Seaport. The complex consists of 1,590 apartments in twelve 13-story brick buildings surrounding two courtyards.

== Location ==
The development is located at 10-12-14-16-18-20 Monroe Street and 30-32-34-36-38-40 Monroe Street, taking up two whole city blocks and bounded by Catherine Street, Monroe Street, Market Street, and Cherry Street. It is in ZIP Code 10002.

== History ==
By 1929, the site later by Knickerbocker Village was home to a predominantly Italian immigrant community. Known as the "Lung Block," at the turn of the twentieth century, the neighborhood became the focus of public-health and housing reform campaigns. Journalist Ernest Poole's 1903 exposé, The Plague in Its Stronghold, helped establish its reputation as one of New York City's most notorious slums, depicting its overcrowded tenements as centers of tuberculosis. Subsequent scholarship has concluded that these representations combined genuine concerns about housing and public health with class prejudice and anti-immigrant sentiment. By 1908, renovations had brought the tenements into compliance with existing housing regulations, which, alongside improvements in sanitation and public-health measures led declining tuberculosis rates. The city's Tenement House Department itself declared the designation "Lung Block" a misnomer in its 1908 annual report.

During the late 1920s and early 1930s, real estate developer Fred F. French acquired much of the area as part of a larger plan to replace Lower East Side tenements with middle-class housing for Wall Street workers. Stefano Morello and Kerri Culhane have argued that French deliberately revived the Lung Block's decades-old reputation as a tuberculosis-ridden slum to justify its demolition and secure federal financing for redevelopment. In 1932, he reprinted housing reformer Louis Heaton Pink's 1907 pamphlet Old Tenements and the New Law, having underlined its references to the Lung Block, to strengthen the case for clearance. French also commissioned photographs depicting the neighborhood's allegedly shocking conditions, although many of the resulting images showed ordinary scenes of everyday life in a predominantly immigrant neighborhood.

In 1933, French secured financing from the Reconstruction Finance Corporation to build Knickerbocker Village, one of the first federally financed apartment developments in the United States. Demolition of the Lung Block began in October 1933, and the new apartment complex opened in 1934.

Although promoted as low-cost housing, the development's rents averaged approximately $12.50 per room, compared with approximately $5 per room in the demolished tenements, placing the apartments beyond the means of most former residents.

The redevelopment displaced much of the neighborhood's Italian immigrant community and provided 1,590 small apartments primarily to middle-income families. A study conducted by the Fred L. Lavanburg Foundation and Hamilton House of 386 displaced families found that 379 wished to move into Knickerbocker Village, but only three planned to do so because of the higher rents. Of those surveyed, 319 families, or approximately 83 percent, continued to live in older tenements following their displacement. Instead of rehousing the original residents of the former Lung Block, the development primarily accommodated a more affluent population. The redevelopment has later been characterized as an early example of gentrification in Manhattan.

In the post-World War II period, the complex became known for its tenant organizing activities and disputes with management, which contributed to the development of landlord–tenant protections and rent-control regulations.

In 1977, Fred F. French Investing Co., Inc. sold its controlling interest in Knickerbocker Village, Inc. to Cherry Green Property Corporation, which subsequently made an offer to acquire the remaining outstanding shares.

=== 21st century ===
The property suffered severe damage from Hurricane Sandy in 2012 and ultimately received significant funds from the city's "Build it Back" program. The complex became one of the first affordable housing complexes with facial recognition technology. A tax break in 2019 put an end to a five year fight to prevent a significant rent increase that would have made the property unaffordable to most tenants.

In the 2024 presidential election, Democratic candidate Kamala Harris carried New York City's Borough of Manhattan by 81% and the city itself by 68%, but the western part of Knickerbocker Village handed Donald Trump a 16 vote margin victory out of roughly 500 votes cast. The difference was 251 for Trump and 235 for Harris, which resulted in Trump's only precinct victory in Manhattan out of any of his three presidential runs.

== Notable residents ==
Notable residents have included:

- Cheng Chui Ping, 'Snakehead', human smuggler lived at 14 Monroe Street in the 1980s–early 1990s.
- Mark Olf, the Jewish folksinger and Folkways recording artist
- Peter C. Rhodes, reporter and writer
- Julius Rosenberg and Ethel Rosenberg, who were convicted of spying for the Soviet Union and later executed, lived on the eleventh floor in 10 Monroe Street at Knickerbocker Village.
- Frederik Pohl, the American editor and writer.
- Benjamin Ruggiero of the Bonanno crime family, portrayed by Al Pacino in the movie Donnie Brasco
- Tony Mirra, caporegime of the Bonanno crime family
- Robert Perrino, murdered superintendent of deliveries at the New York Post and associate of the Bonanno crime family
- Joseph D'Amico, Bonanno crime family mobster
- Alfred Embarrato, caporegime of the Bonanno crime family
- Nicholas Marangello, underboss of the Bonanno crime family
- Richard Cantarella, caporegime of the Bonanno crime family
