= Anthony Mirra =

American mobster

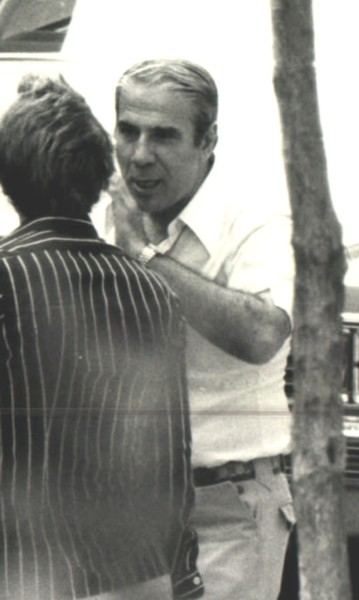
- FBI surveillance photo from September 3, 1977 of Mirra speaking to his captain Cesare Bonventre.
- Born: July 18, 1927; New York City, U.S.
- Died: February 18, 1982 (aged 54); New York City, U.S.
- Cause of death: Gunshot wounds
- Relatives: Richard Cantarella (cousin); Joseph D'Amico (cousin); Alfred Embarrato (uncle)
- Allegiance: Bonanno crime family
- Conviction: Drug trafficking (1962)
- Penalty: 20 years' imprisonment

Anthony "Tony" Mirra (July 18, 1927 – February 18, 1982) was an American mobster, soldier and later caporegime for the Bonanno crime family. He is known for introducing FBI Special Agent Joseph "Donnie Brasco" Pistone into the Bonanno family.

== Early life ==
Mirra was born to Albert Mirra and Millie Embarrato in Manhattan. He was the nephew of Bonanno family caporegime Alfred Embarrato and cousins with street soldier Joseph D'Amico, capo Richard Cantarella, capo Frank Cantarella, and Bonanno family capo Paul Cantarella.

Mirra was born in the poverty-stricken Two Bridges, Manhattan at Knickerbocker Village where he lived in the same apartment building as Embarrato, Richard Cantarella and D'Amico. The Federal Bureau of Narcotics lists his address of residence at 115 Madison Street (Manhattan) in Lower East Side, New York. Mirra was once a good friend of Benjamin "Lefty" Ruggiero; Mirra owned the Bus Stop Luncheonette in Little Italy, Manhattan not far from Ruggiero's bar. His relatives D'Amico, Embarrato and Cantarella became involved in major racketeering schemes at The New York Post distribution center behind their housing complex, but Mirra moved on to more successful and prosperous racketeering endeavours.

== Criminal career ==
Mirra worked for Bonanno capo Michael Zaffarano, and was involved in extortion, gambling and drug trafficking. On July 10, 1962, Mirra was convicted of drug trafficking and was sentenced to 20 years in federal prison.

Mirra remained a recluse from his fellow mobsters including his own relatives, which included Richard Cantarella, and eventually even became estranged from his uncle Alfred. Mirra was the first contact FBI agent Joseph Pistone made in his undercover operation, which led to his infiltration of the Bonanno family. Pistone was working as an associate for the Colombo family at the time. Mirra introduced Pistone to "Lefty" Ruggiero and offered him a job handling his slot-machine route. Pistone went under the name "Donnie Brasco" and posed as a jewel thief.

In 1977, Mirra fled New York after being indicted for drug trafficking. The FBI caught up with him three months later and he was sent to federal prison again for eight and a half years. When Mirra got out of jail, Brasco had since become close with Ruggiero and was working under him. Mirra argued that Brasco belonged to him, not Ruggiero. Mirra took the issue right to the top and had several meetings over the situation. In the end, Ruggiero won.

After the sudden death of his capo, Michael Zaffarano, Mirra took over the Bonanno family pornography empire and worked under the powerful Sicilian capo Cesare Bonventre. Mirra also muscled in on several Little Italy, Manhattan, restaurants and bars. He was involved in a vending machine operation that dealt in slot machines, peanut vending machines, video arcade machines and pinball machines that were distributed all over New York City. He had them installed in stores, luncheonettes, social clubs and after-hours establishments.

The slot machines, since they were illegal, would be installed in the establishment's back room or basement. The coin collection route produced $2,000 a week, and he would open the machines with a key he carried and give the store owner his cut of the profits (at least $25). Mirra was involved in "strong arm" schemes and extorted from several bars and restaurants. The owners "fee" was $5,000 a week in protection money and if they defaulted an angry Mirra would follow up with threats and violence.

== Bonanno civil war ==
In 1979, following the takeover of Philip Rastelli as leader of the Bonanno family, the family divided into two rival factions. The "Red" Team led by capos Alphonse "Sonny Red" Indelicato, Dominick Trinchera and Philip Giaccone, and the "Black" Team led by Dominick "Sonny Black" Napolitano and Joseph Massino. The day before Giaccone, Trinchera and Indelicato were to be ambushed and executed, Mirra announced at the Toyland Social Club to Nicholas Marangello that he was joining the opposition.

On May 5, 1981, the day of the executions, Napolitano called Mirra's uncle, Albert Embarrato, and told him to come down to The Motion Lounge for a "sit down". At the sit down, Napolitano had two of his soldiers flank Embarrato on either side until Napolitano received confirmation that the executions were followed through. Napolitano would later tell Pistone, "When he (Albert) heard that, he turned ash white. He thought we were going to hit him too. But I just reamed at him about Tony, told him Tony was no good and that he (Albert) better recognize that and act right himself." Embarrato agreed.

== Operation Donnie Brasco and death ==
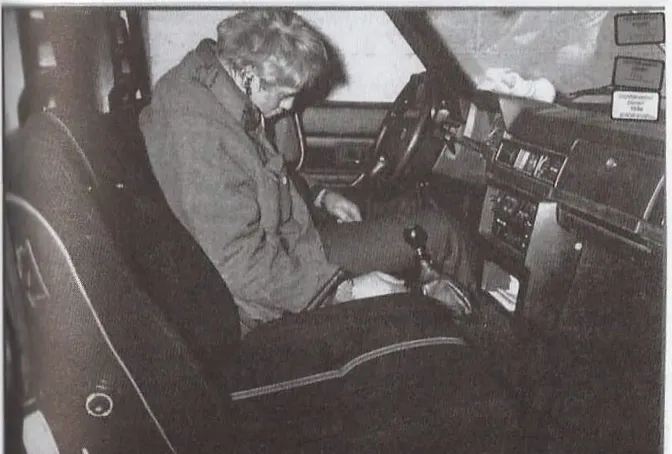
Mirra crime scene February 1982

In mid-1981, when Pistone was revealed as an FBI agent, "Sonny Black" Napolitano, "Lefty" Ruggiero, and Mirra were all blamed for initially allowing the infiltration. Mirra went into hiding. Joseph Massino ordered Mirra's uncle Alfred Embarrato and Mirra's two cousins, Richard Cantarella and Joseph D'Amico, to kill him. On February 18, 1982, D'Amico lured him to a parking garage in Lower Manhattan. Embarrato and Cantarella were waiting in a getaway car. The pair went to the parking garage, climbed into Mirra's car, and drove up to a locked security gate. D'Amico later described in a testimony, "He took out his key, put it in the box, but he didn't get a chance to turn the box... I shot him at close range several times on the side of his head."
