= Vito Bonventre =

Sicilian mobster (1875–1930)

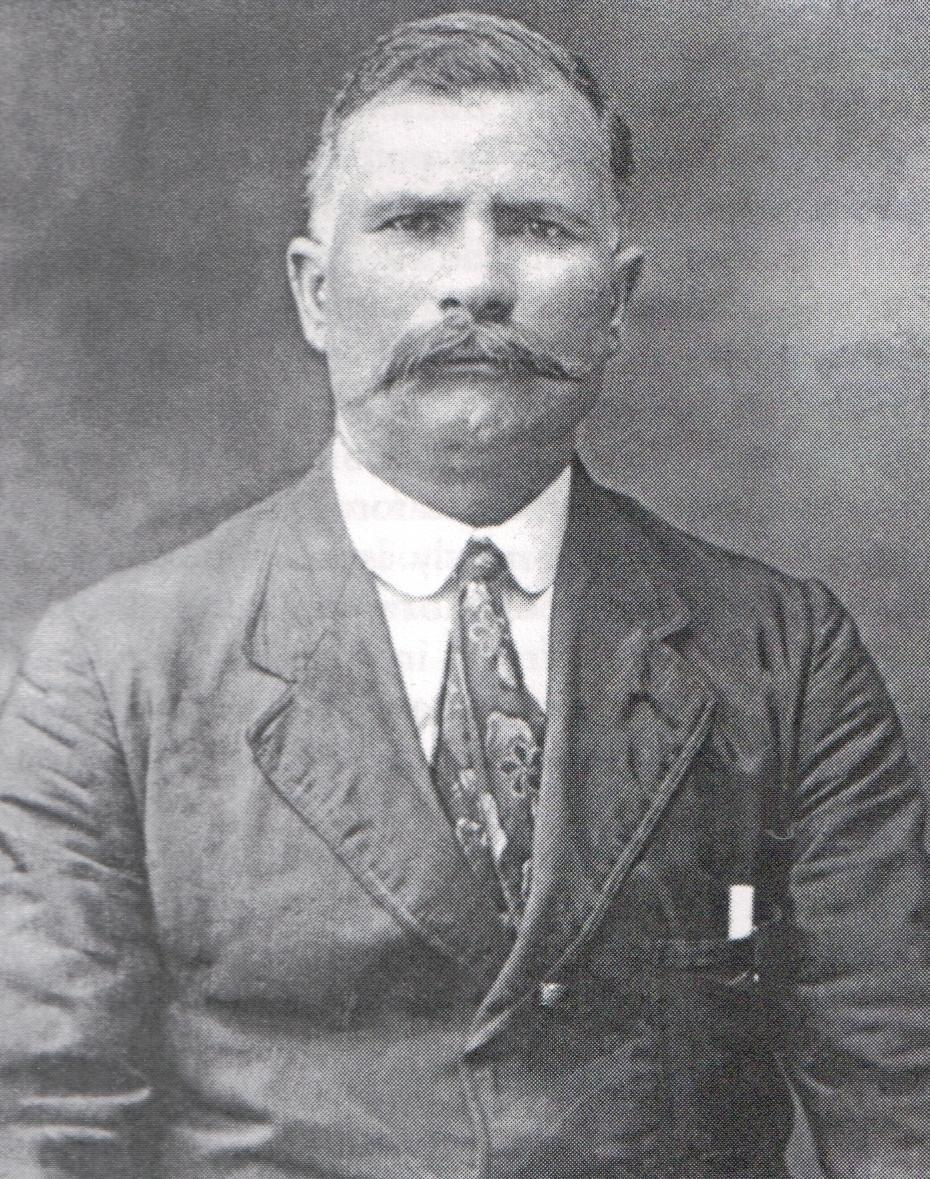
- Born: January 1, 1875; Castellamare del Golfo, Sicily, Italy
- Died: July 15, 1930 (aged 55); Brooklyn, New York City, U.S.
- Cause of death: Gunshot
- Other name: "The King"
- Occupation: Mobster
- Relatives: Giovanni Bonventre (cousin); Cesare Bonventre (nephew)
- Allegiance: Schiro crime family

Vito Bonventre (January 1, 1875 – July 15, 1930) was a New York City mobster who was a leading member of the Brooklyn gang that would later become the Bonanno crime family. He was arrested but then released in 1921 as the leader of a group known as the "Good Killers". Bonventre was murdered in 1930 at the start of a conflict between his gang and a rival gang led by Joe Masseria, referred to as the Castellammarese War.

== Early years ==
Vito Bonventre was born on January 1, 1875, in the town of Castellammare del Golfo in Sicily. In Castellammare del Golfo, his family was a member of a mafia clan created by an alliance with the Magaddino family in opposition to a mafia clan led by the Buccellato family. He immigrated to the United States just after the beginning of the twentieth century and settled in the Williamsburg section of Brooklyn. He soon became a member of the local mafia gang led by Nicolo Schiro.

== Leader of "The Good Killers" ==
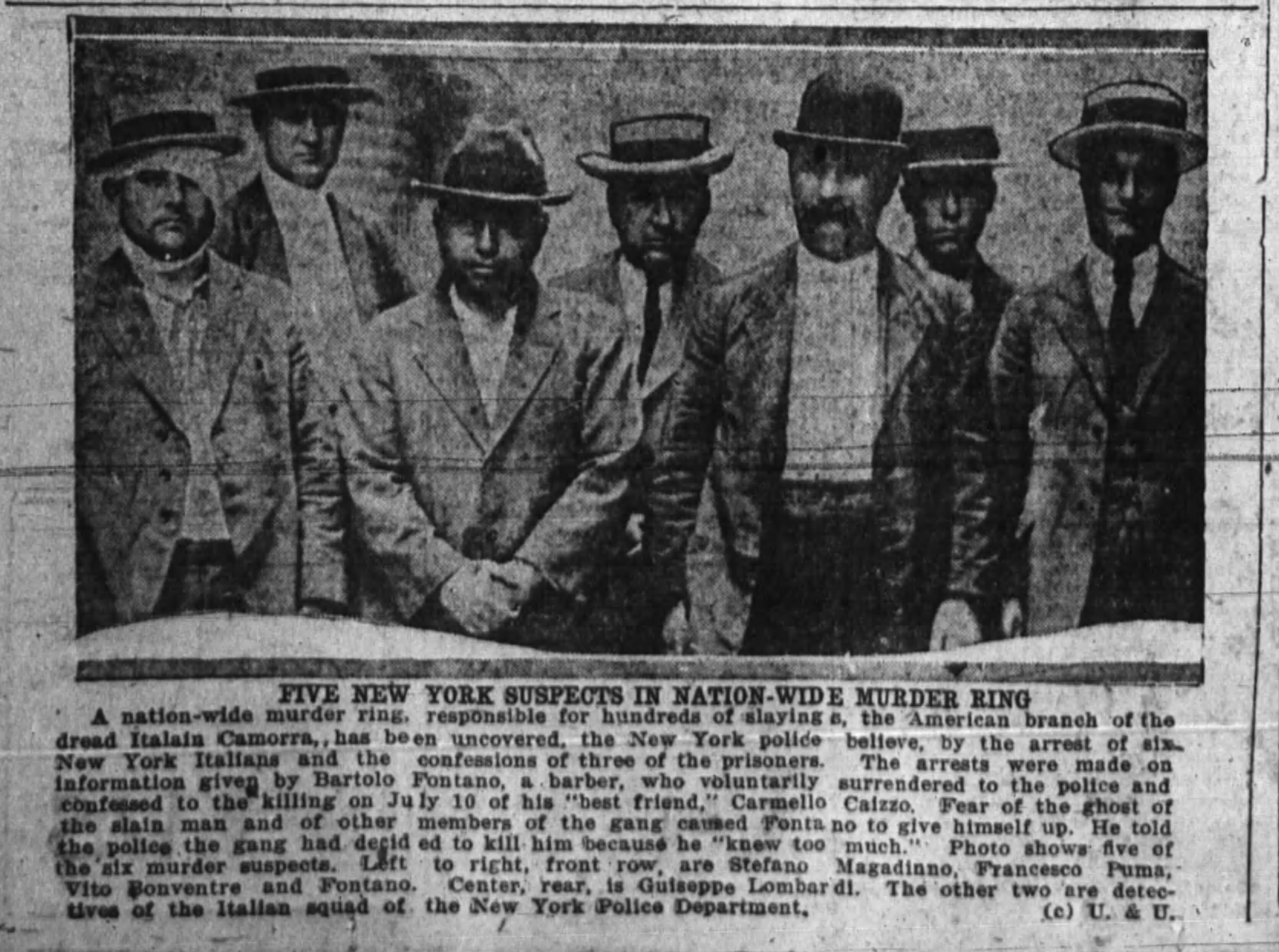
"Good Killers" suspects in police custody, 1921. Left to right, front row, Stefano Magaddino, Francesco Puma, Vito Bonventre and Bartolo Fontana. Center, rear, is Giuseppe Lombardi. The other two are detectives of the Italian squad of the New York Police Department.

Bonventre was arrested on August 16, 1921, in New York City along with Stefano Magaddino, Francesco Puma, Giuseppe Lombardi, Mariano Galante, and Bartolomeo DiGregorio for the murder of Camillo Caiozzo in Neptune, New Jersey, a couple of weeks earlier. Bonventre and the others were arrested following the confession of Bartolo Fontana. Fontana identified the men as members of the "Good Killers", a group of mafioso from Castellammare del Golfo with Bonventre as their leader. Fontana claimed they ordered him to kill Caiozzo in retaliation for the 1916 murder of Magaddino's brother, Pietro, in Sicily. He also said that the "Good Killers" were responsible for at least sixteen other murders.

Some of the victims he named were connected to the rival Buccellato family in Castellammere del Golfo. These included three Buccellato brothers living in Detroit: Salvatore, Felice, and Joseph killed in 1917-19 and their cousin, Pietro Buccellato killed in 1917.

The government's case against the "Good Killers" collapsed with only Fontana's testimony against them. Fontana went to prison for Caiozzo's murder and the others were released. Magaddino was unnerved by his close call and fled the city, eventually becoming the local mafia boss in Buffalo. Bonventre remained in New York as a leading member of the Schiro gang. With the onset of Prohibition, Bonventre became involved in extensive bootlegging activities.

== Death ==
During the early months of the Castellammarese War, Bonventre became a target as Castellammarese-born members of Schiro's gang began to threaten rival boss Joe Masseria's domination over mafia gangs. Masseria forced Schiro to pay him $10,000 and step down as boss of the gang. Afterwards on July 15, 1930, Bonventre was shot outside his garage.

Bonventre is buried in Calvary Cemetery in Woodside, Queens.
