= Perry Criscitelli =

Perry Criscitelli (born 1950) is an American restaurant owner who is an alleged member of the Bonanno crime family. Criscitelli owns several restaurants and previously managed a popular city street festival.

In 1996, Criscitelli was selected as president of Figli di San Gennaro, the Feast of San Gennaro, an Italian street festival that takes place every September on Mulberry Street in Little Italy, Manhattan. In 1995, New York Mayor Rudy Giuliani had threatened to close the festival because it was controlled by the Genovese crime family. Instead, he chose Criscitelli to run it because Criscitelli was supposedly not associated with organized crime.

However, during the 2004 trial of Bonanno crime family boss Joe Massino, it was revealed in court that Criscitelli joined the Bonanno family in 2001 and was a major moneymaker for them. Mobster Richard Cantarella testified that he attended Criscitelli's induction ceremony, and that mob figures regularly discussed family business at one of Criscitelli's restaurants. While serving as acting boss of the Bonanno family, Vincent Basciano allegedly met with Criscitelli several times and briefed jailed Bonanno boss Joseph Massino on Criscitelli's activities. Criscitelli categorically denied any involvement with organized crime.

On July 27, 2004, Criscitelli resigned as head of the Feast of San Gennaro, citing the best interests of the festival. In recent years, Criscitelli sold his Italian restaurant on Staten Island, New York. However, his family still owns Da Nico in Little Italy, one of Giuliani's favorite eateries, along with Pellegrino's, Novello, Il Palazzo, La Nonna and SPQR.
