= Joseph D'Amico =

American mobster

Joseph D'Amico (born 1955 in Little Italy, Manhattan), also known as "Joey The Mook", is an American mobster who was an inducted member in the Bonanno crime family before he turned government informant. D'Amico was a long-time street soldier who worked under his cousin, Richard Cantarella. He later served as his acting captain.

== Biography ==
D'Amico was born and raised in the Knickerbocker Village public housing tenement building in Two Bridges, Manhattan where his uncle Albert Embarrato, Anthony Mirra, cousin Richard Cantarella and fellow mobster Benjamin "Lefty Guns" Ruggiero resided. He was also a cousin of Paul Cantarella and Frank Cantarella. He was a close friend of New York Post Superintendent of Deliveries, Robert Perrino and Anthony Mirra. In the 1970s, he met undercover FBI agent Joseph Pistone, but did not suffer the vicious aftermath as his cousin Mirra did. D'Amico is not to be confused with Gambino crime family former boss Jackie D'Amico, to whom he is not related.

=== Murder of Anthony Mirra ===
In mid-1981, when Pistone was revealed as an FBI agent, "Sonny Black" Napolitano, "Lefty" Ruggiero, and Mirra were all on the firing line for initially allowing the infiltration. Mirra went into hiding. Joseph Massino ordered Mirra's two cousins D'Amico and Richard Cantarella, and their uncle Alfred Embarrato, to kill him. On February 18, 1982, D'Amico lured Mirra to a parking garage in Lower Manhattan. Embarrato and Cantarella were waiting in a getaway car. The pair went to the parking garage, climbed into Mirra's car, and drove up to a locked security gate. D'Amico later described in a testimony, "He took out his key, put it in the box, but he didn’t get a chance to turn the box... I shot him at close range several times on the side of his head."

=== Acting Capo and government witness ===
With Sal Vitale's demotion to Captain, Richard Cantarella became acting underboss in 2002. He appointed D'Amico as his acting captain. It is unknown if he held this position at the time of his conviction and ultimate cooperation.
