= Mark Olf =

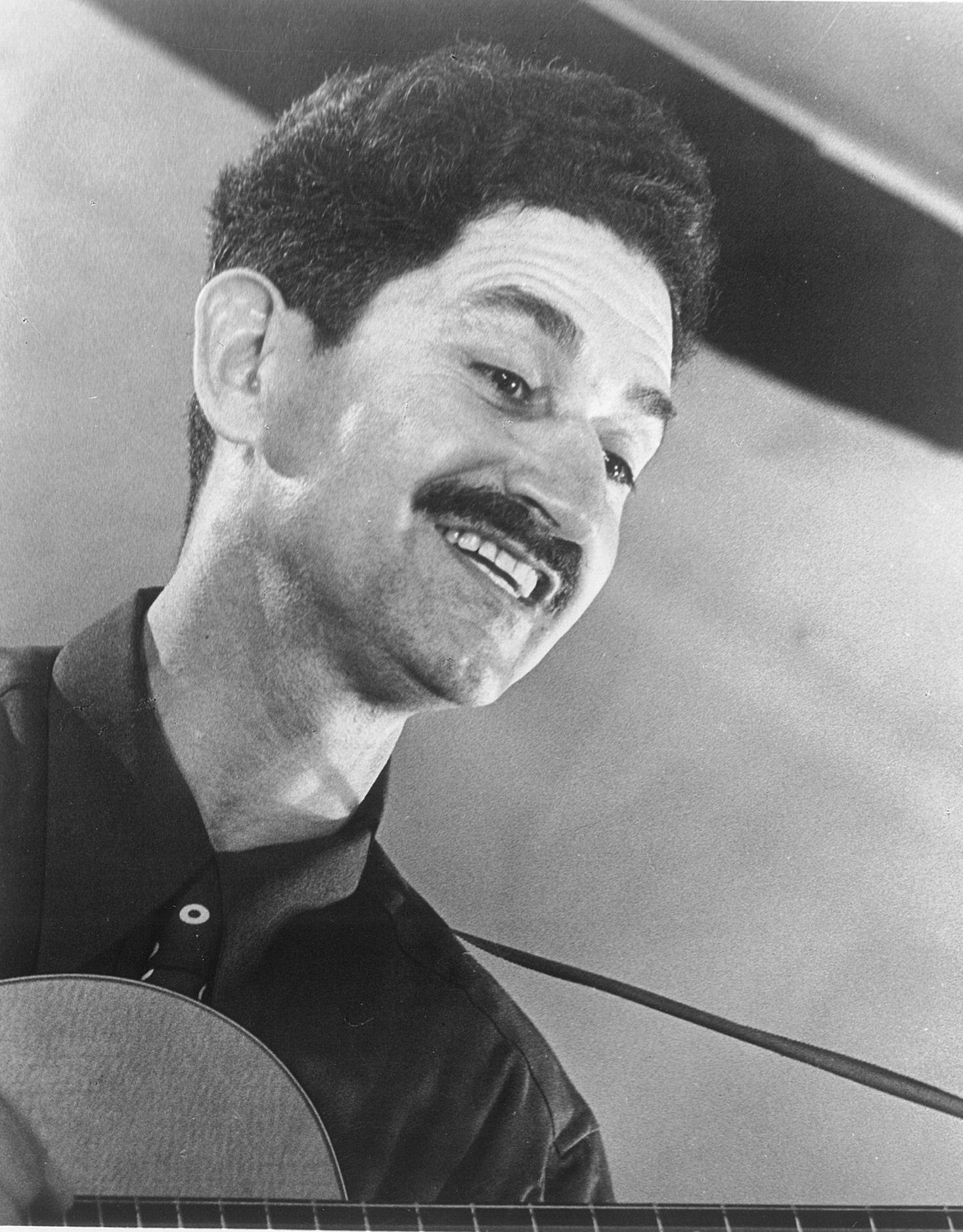
- Mark Olf, folksinger and recording artist

Background information
- Born: Mark Olf; May 15, 1905; Bielsk, Russia
- Died: June 7, 1987 (aged 82) New York City
- Occupations: Folksinger and recording artist
- Instruments: Guitar, vocals
- Years active: 1951–1987
- Label: Smithsonian Folkways

Mark Olf (May 15, 1905 – June 7, 1987) was a Jewish folksinger and recording artist. Accompanying himself on the guitar, Olf documented and preserved Yiddish and Hebrew folk songs, many of which he had heard as a child in Russia.

== Early years ==
The son of Jacob Olf and Ida Krantz, Mark Olf was born in Bielsk, then a part of the Russian Empire near Białystok and the Belarus border. During the First World War, when Olf was in his early teens, he emigrated with his parents and his brothers, Abraham and Harold, to the United States, where they became naturalized citizens and settled on the Lower East Side of Manhattan. Another brother, George, was born in 1922. As a youth, Olf enjoyed exercising police horses on the Coney Island beach, sparring with Golden Gloves boxers and acting in the 2nd Avenue Yiddish theater. He learned automotive trades in his late-teens and, from 1929 to 1937, was the proprietor of an automobile repair and service station at the foot of the Brooklyn Bridge. When the United States entered the Second World War, Olf served as an instructor of automotive trades to U.S. servicemen. At the time he met his future wife, the pianist Rubia Goldman, he was studying the violin. His avowed artistic interest, however, was playing the guitar and singing Yiddish folk music. The two married in 1938, and Olf launched his career as a folksinger – largely supported by his wife who, after receiving a Graduate Degree in Music Education, taught music for the New York City Board of Education. Rubia Olf also wrote the translations and transliterations for liner notes that accompanied Olf's recordings.

== Later years and career ==
In the late 1930s, the Olfs moved to Knickerbocker Village on New York City's Two Bridges, Manhattan and had two children, Julian (b. 1942) and Jonathan (b. 1944). Early in the 1950s the family moved to Queens (first Kew Gardens Hills, then Woodside). Olf recorded his first album on the Folkways Records label in 1951. Over the next decade he recorded three albums of Yiddish songs and one of Hebrew songs – in all, fifty-one songs, some of which had not previously been heard in the United States. Library Journal described his 1960 recording of Yiddish songs for children as "warmly sung in the original language"; the recording was issued with a booklet of the lyrics, including phonetic renderings of the Yiddish words.

During summers in the 1950s, Olf was the sing leader at the Educational Alliance's Surprise Lake Camp, in Cold Spring, New York. He also sang periodically at the Workmen's Circle camp in Hopewell Junction, New York, and at the Jewish collective, Camp Woodland, in Englewood, New Jersey. Olf's cherished pastimes included composing music to his wife's lyrics, studying classical flute, listening to Mahler music, participating in the New York Mandolin Orchestra and composing music for verse by the Moldavian poet, David Seltzer.

Olf toured the country, performing his music through the sponsorship of the Jewish Center Lecture Bureau of the National Jewish Welfare Board. His live and recorded performances were periodically broadcast on WEVD, New York City's Jewish radio station. He was the author of Spanish Guitar Technique: A Practical Approach to the Art of Finger Playing for Self-Accompaniment, Classical and Flamenco Guitar. In addition to teaching guitar privately, he taught the instrument at the Henry Street Settlement, Queens College and the University of Rhode Island.

In 1987, the Smithsonian Institution acquired the Folkways Record Company and made a commitment to keeping available all recordings in the Folkways catalogue. Olf died from leukemia in June of that year, without knowing that his music had become part of the nation's archives and would remain available in perpetuity. A memorial ceremony was held on June 25, 1987, at the Hebrew Actors Union Building, New York City.

== Smithsonian Folkways records ==
- Jewish Folksongs, Vol. 1
  Released 1951
  FW06826
- Jewish Folk Songs, Vol. 2
  Released 1954
  FW06827
- Hebrew Folk Songs
  Released 1957
  FW06928
- Yiddish Folk Songs for Children
  Released 1960
  FW07234
