= Sebastiano DiGaetano =

American mafia boss (c.1862–1912)

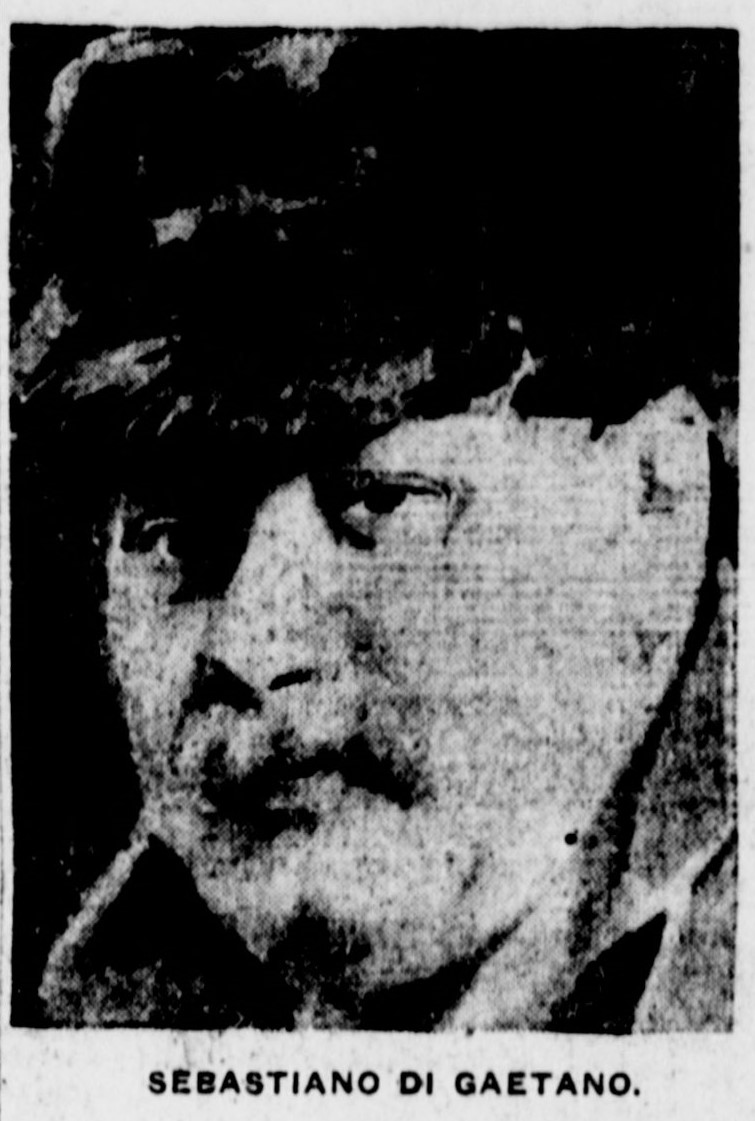
- DiGaetano, 1910
- Born: c. 1862; Castellammare del Golfo, Sicily, Kingdom of Italy
- Disappeared: 1912
- Status: Missing for 114 years and 7 or 8 months
- Occupations: Crime boss, mobster
- Predecessor: Paolo Orlando
- Successor: Nicolo Schiro
- Allegiance: DiGaetano crime family

Sebastiano DiGaetano (Italian pronunciation: [sebaˈstjaːno diɡaeˈtaːno]; c. 1862 – disappeared March 1912) was an Italian-born American New York City mafia boss of what would later become known as the Bonanno crime family. He briefly attained the title capo dei capi (boss of bosses) of the Sicilian-American mafia, after Giuseppe Morello had been convicted of counterfeiting money in 1910. DiGaetano stepped down as boss of his crime family in 1912.

== Early days ==
Sebastiano DiGaetano was born in the town of Castellammare del Golfo in Sicily in c. 1862, to Arcangelo DiGaetano and Angela DiBenedetto. He first arrived in the United States on October 24, 1898, with his wife and daughter joining him in 1901. By 1908 the DiGaetano family had moved from Manhattan to the Williamsburg section of Brooklyn, with Sebastiano becoming a barber. DiGaetano's daughter, Angelina, married Joseph Ruffino, who was arrested for burglary in 1913 along with future mafia boss Joe Masseria.

== Brooklyn crime boss ==
DiGaetano is believed to have become the boss of the Williamsburg-centered mafia sometime in 1909 or 1910. (Note: This timeframe is based on an April 1909 letter sent by an anonymous informant in Brooklyn to the Palermo police commissioner claiming that a Paolo Orlando was the boss of Brooklyn mafia and DiGaetano's December 1910 arrest.) DiGaetano first came to the attention of authorities in December 1910, when he was arrested under suspicion of orchestrating the kidnappings of eight-year-old Giuseppe Longo and seven-year-old Michael Rizzo for ransom. The charges were later dropped due to lack of evidence.

A few months later, Salvatore Clemente, a Secret Service informer who was a counterfeiter in the Morello gang was summoned to a meeting with DiGaetano. DiGaetano told Clemente to refrain from his counterfeiting activities until another mafioso, named Carmelo Codaro, who was suspected of disloyalty was "disposed of." DiGaetano was able to dictate orders to a member of a different mafia crime family because he had been made a temporary capo dei capi, or "Boss of bosses", after the previous one, Giuseppe Morello, had been imprisoned in Atlanta on counterfeiting charges. DiGaetano had assumed that role due to his relative weakness as a crime boss. Morello had been hoping that would allow him to continue to dominate the New York mafia from prison. However, the arrangement had collapsed by 1912 which led to Salvatore D'Aquila being selected as a permanent replacement as capo dei capi.

In March 1912, DiGaetano stepped down as boss of his crime family and was soon replaced by Nicolo Schiro. Clemente claimed that DiGaetano was stepping down because he had "lost his nerve". Shortly after he stepped down as boss, DiGaetano disappeared; some researchers speculate he and his wife returned to Italy.

== See also ==
- Black Hand (extortion)
- Crime in New York City
- List of people who disappeared

== Notes ==
American Mafia
Preceded by Paolo Orlando?	Bonanno crime family Boss; 1909?–1912	Succeeded by Nicolo Schiro
Preceded by Giuseppe Morello	Capo dei capi Boss of bosses 1910–1912	Succeeded by Salvatore D'Aquila
