= Stefano Magaddino =

Italian-American mob boss (1891–1974)

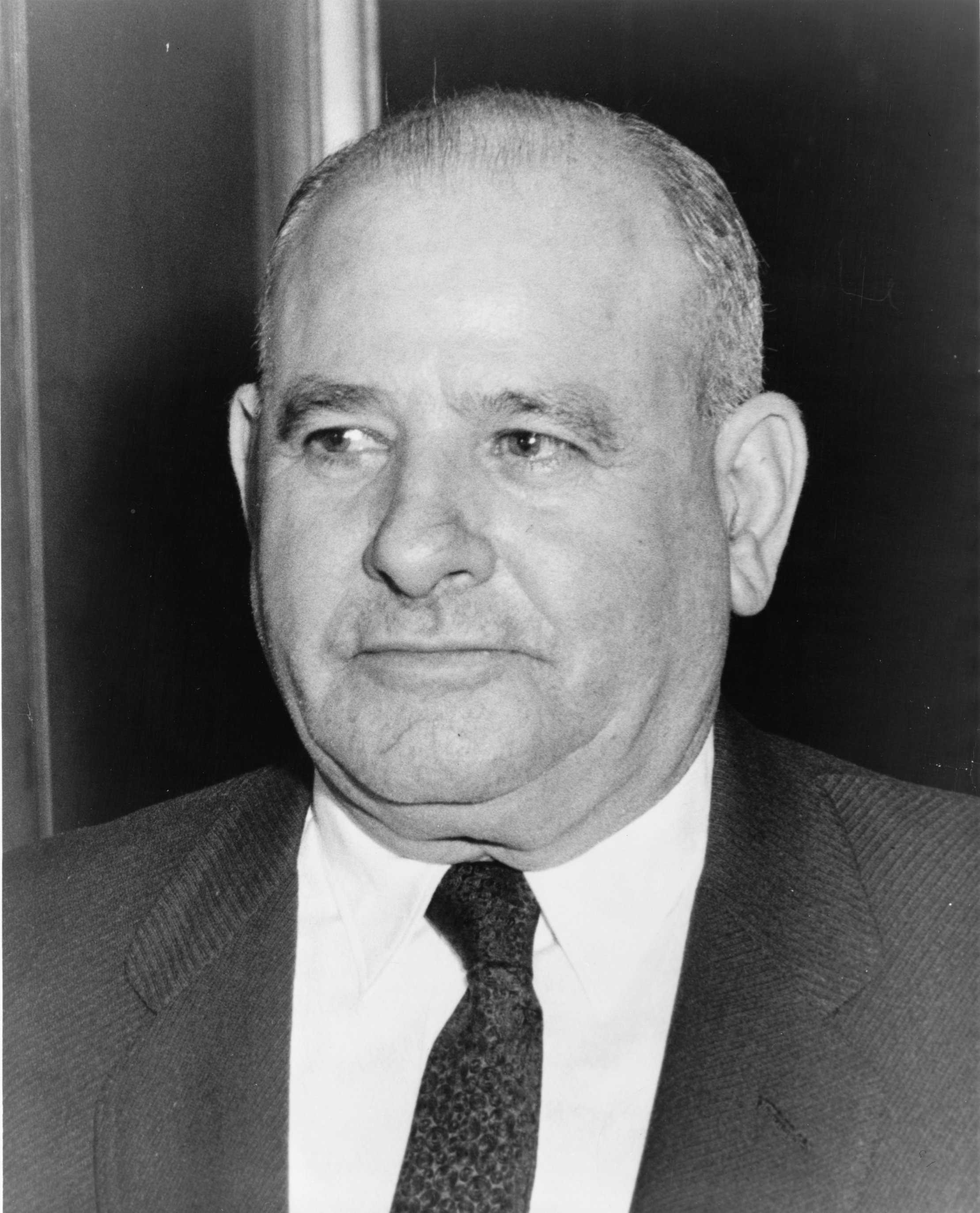
- Born: October 10, 1891; Castellammare del Golfo, Sicily, Italy
- Died: July 19, 1974 (aged 82); Lewiston, New York, U.S.
- Resting place: St. Joseph's Cemetery, Niagara Falls, New York
- Other names: "Don Stefano", "The Undertaker"
- Citizenship: American
- Occupation: Crime boss
- Children: Peter Magaddino
- Relatives: Joseph Bonanno (first cousin once removed)
- Allegiance: Buffalo crime family

Stefano "The Undertaker" Magaddino (Italian pronunciation: [ˈsteːfano maɡadˈdiːno]; October 10, 1891 – July 19, 1974) was an Italian-born crime boss of the Buffalo crime family in western New York. His underworld influence stretched from Ohio to Southern Ontario and as far east as Montreal, Quebec. Known as Don Stefano to his friends and The Undertaker to others, he was also a charter member of the American Mafia's ruling council, The Commission.

== Early years ==
Stefano Magaddino was born on October 10, 1891, in Castellammare del Golfo, Sicily. Magaddino's father (Giovanni Magaddino), was the brother of Joseph Bonanno's maternal grandmother. Magaddino's uncle of the same name led a Castellammarese clan allied with Giuseppe "Peppe" Bonanno and his older brother and advisor, Stefano, uncles to Joseph Bonanno.

During the 1900s, the clans feuded with Felice Buccellato, the boss of the Buccellato Mafia clan. After the murders of Stefano and Giuseppe, their younger brother, Salvatore (the father to Joseph Bonanno), took revenge by killing members of the Buccellatos.

In 1902, Magaddino arrived in New York and became a powerful member of the Castellammarese clan. Magaddino married Carmella and the couple had four children.

His son Peter A. Magaddino, born on February 25, 1917, became a made member of the Buffalo mafia family and married the niece of Buffalo mobster Charles Montana. The eldest daughter Josephine married Charles Montana, the nephew of Buffalo mobster John C. Montana. The next daughter Angelina married James V. LaDuca, who was a member of the Buffalo family. The last daughter Arcangela married Vincent Scro, a mobster in the Buffalo family.

Magaddino's brother Anthony "Nino" Magaddino and his brother's son Peter J. Magaddino both became members of the Buffalo family.

== Criminal career ==
=== The "Good Killers" case ===
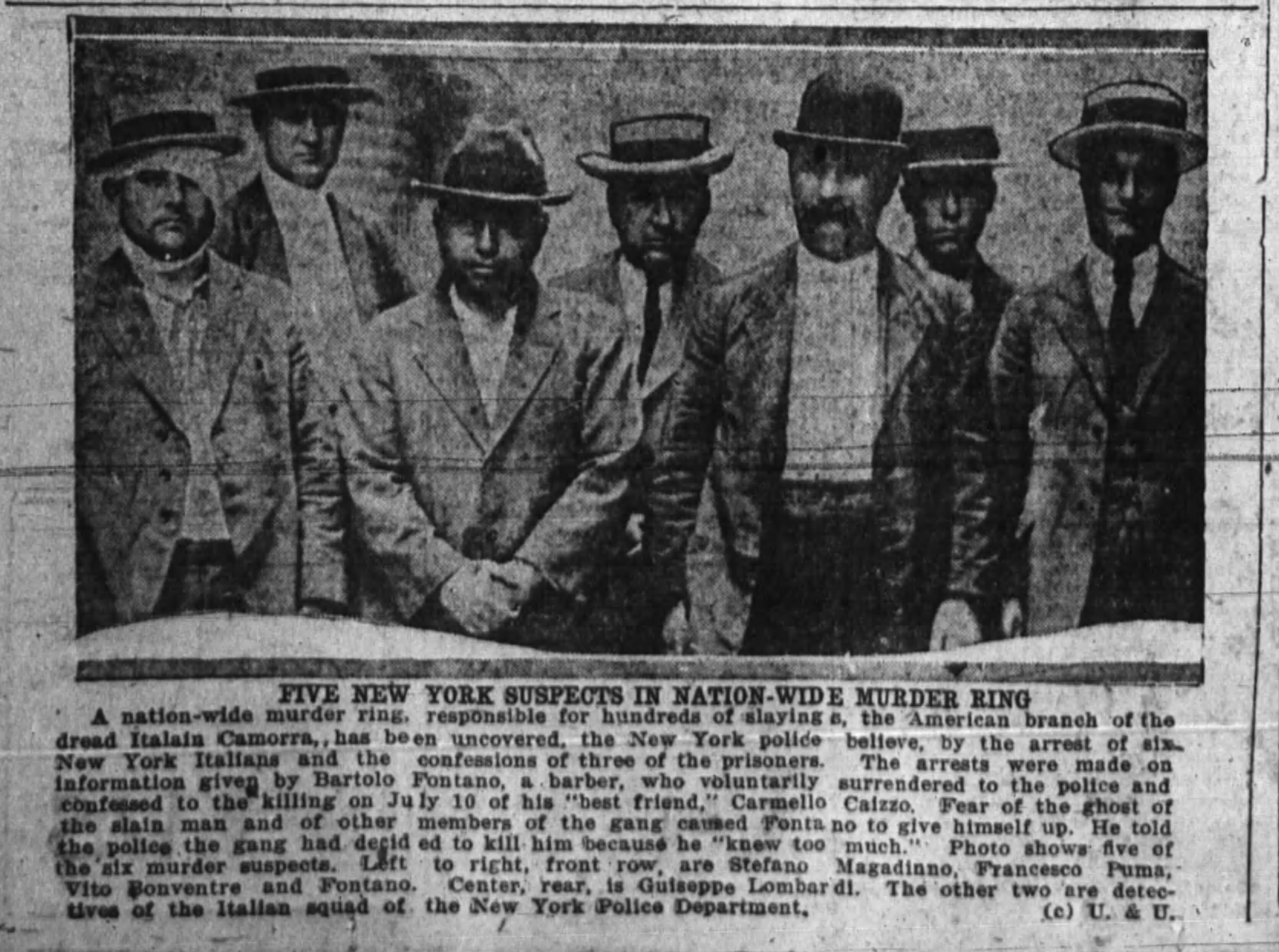
Magaddino with four other "Good Killers" suspects in police custody, 1921. Left to right, front row: Magaddino, Francisco Puma, Vito Bonventre, and Bartolo Fontana. Center, rear: Giuseppe Lombardi.

Magaddino orchestrated the murder of Detroit gangster Felice Buccellato in March 1917.

In August 1921, a barber named Bartolo Fontana turned himself into the New York police, confessing to murdering Camillo Caiozzo a couple of weeks earlier in Avon, New Jersey. Fontana claimed he murdered Caiozzo at the behest of the "Good Killers", a group of mafiosi who hailed from Castellammare del Golfo, in retaliation for Caiozzo's involvement in the 1916 murder of Magaddino's brother, Pietro, back in Sicily. Fearing he might be murdered, Fontana agreed to help police set up a sting operation. Stefano Magaddino met Fontana at Grand Central Station to give Fontana $30 to help him flee the city. After the exchange, Magaddino was arrested by a group of undercover police. Vito Bonventre and four other gangsters were subsequently arrested for their involvement in the murder.

Fontana revealed that the "Good Killers" were also responsible for a string of other murders.

New Jersey decided not to pursue conspiracy charges in the Caiozzo murder, and the charges against Magaddino were dropped despite the New York police officers' testimony about the sting linking him to the murder.

Magaddino fled New York City after his release, ending up in the Buffalo, New York area. Buffalo crime family boss Joseph DiCarlo died in 1922, and Magaddino succeeded him as boss.

=== Buffalo crime family ===
Joseph Bonanno slipped back into the United States in 1924, by stowing away on a Cuban fishing boat bound for Tampa, Florida with Magaddino's son, Peter Magaddino. According to Bonanno, upon arriving at a train station in Jacksonville, Bonanno was detained by immigration officers and was later released under $1,000 bail. He was welcomed by Willie Moretti and an unidentified man, it was later revealed that Magaddino was responsible for bailing him out as a favor for Giovanni Bonventre, Bonanno's uncle.

In 1924, Magaddino became a naturalized U.S. citizen.

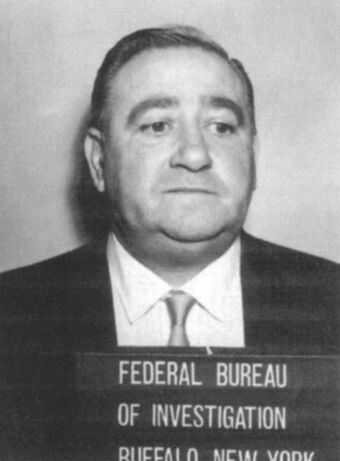
FBI mugshot of Peter Magaddino, the son of Buffalo crime family boss Stefano Magaddino

Although he operated a legitimate funeral home business in Niagara Falls, New York, the Magaddino Memorial Chapel, with Prohibition in effect in the United States, Maggadino made his real money running a profitable bootlegging business by smuggling wine and spirits across the Niagara River into New York State, thereby supplying the needs of speakeasies located in Buffalo and the very "Honky-tonk" Niagara Falls.

After Prohibition ended, Magaddino and his crime family made their money by means of loan sharking, illegal gambling, extortion, carjacking and labor racketeering, as well as other legitimate lucrative businesses such as linen service businesses that served the needs of most of the hotels located throughout the region, taxicab companies, and other service-oriented businesses.

Magaddino's crime family held power in the underworld territories of Upstate and Western New York, namely, Buffalo, New York, bordering Canada and situated on Lake Erie, Rochester and Utica, along the Mohawk River as far east as Amsterdam, New York; from Eastern Pennsylvania as far west as Youngstown, Ohio, and in Canada from Fort Erie (opposite Buffalo) to Toronto, Ontario and as far east as Montreal, Quebec. By the 1960s, it was reported that Magaddino's crime syndicate supplied drugs to the Canadian cities of Hamilton and Guelph, which in turn supplied drugs to Toronto.

Magaddino led his Buffalo family through its most active and profitable era. He preferred to stay in the background and avoid drawing attention to himself or his criminal activities. Due to his territory's remoteness and size, he was sometimes called upon to arbitrate territorial disputes between New York City-based crime families.

=== National crime figure ===
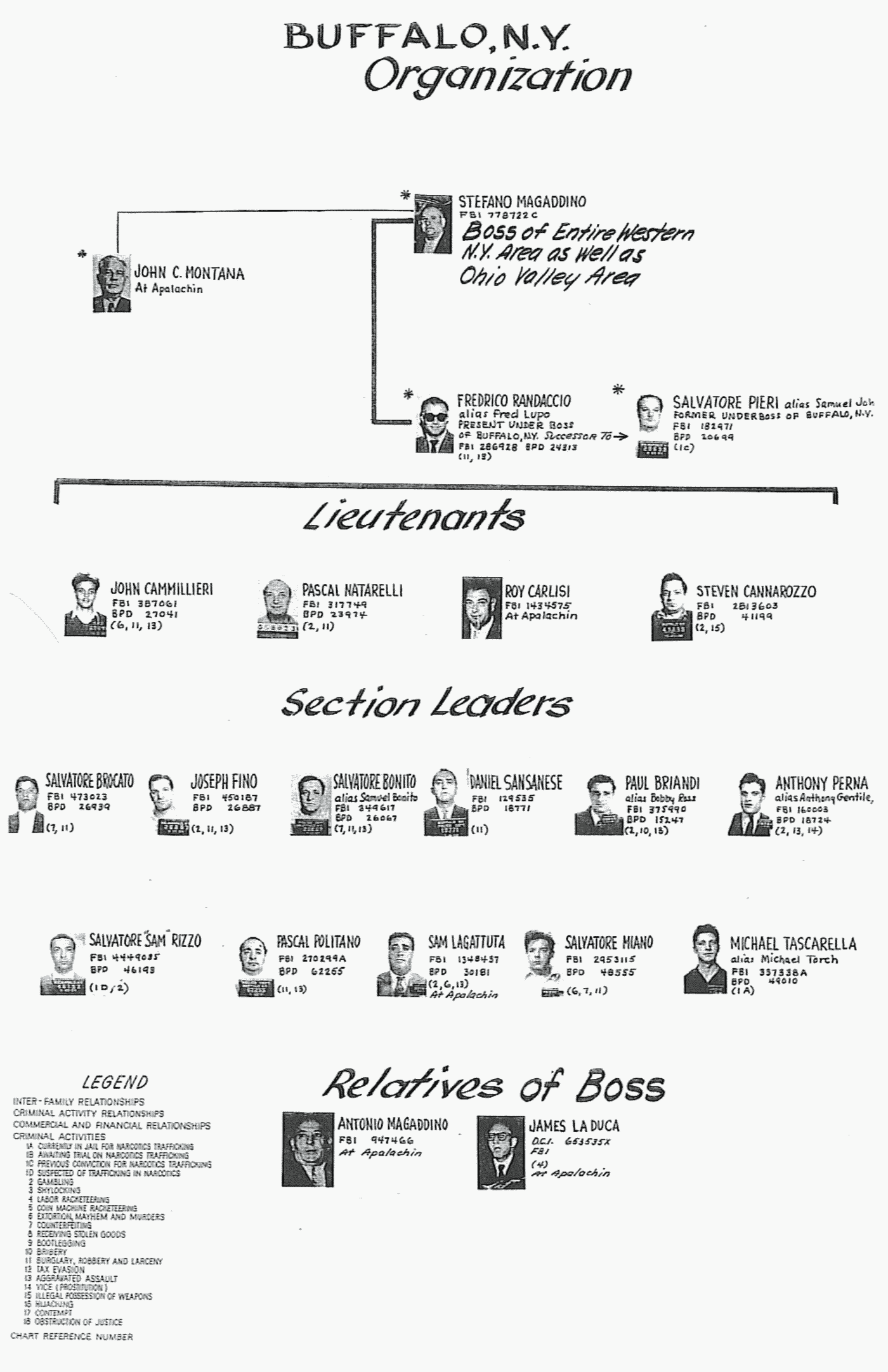
Buffalo crime family - Chart of 1963

For fifty years, Magaddino was a dominant presence in the Buffalo underworld. He was the longest tenured boss in the history of the American Mafia. Magaddino was also involved in national La Cosa Nostra affairs. Magaddino was a charter member of Charles "Lucky" Luciano's Mafia Commission and attended important underworld summits such as the 1946 Havana Conference and the 1957 Apalachin Conference.

It is believed Magaddino, along with Antonio and Johnny Papalia, played a role in notorious Hamilton bootlegger Rocco Perri's disappearance in 1944 in order to gain more Canadian market control. After Perri's disappearance, three of his former lieutenants, in addition to Papalia and Giacomo Luppino, began answering to Magaddino in Buffalo: Tony Sylvestro, Calogero Bordonaro and Santo Scibetta, known as the "three dons".

Magaddino had survived several assassination attempts. In 1936, rival gangsters attempted to kill Magaddino with a bomb, killing his sister instead. In 1958, an assassin tossed a hand grenade through his kitchen window; the grenade failed to explode.

Beginning under the Kennedy administration, who came down hard on organized crime, Magaddino was the subject of extensive eavesdropping by the FBI, who bugged his Niagara Falls funeral home, Magaddino Funeral Chapel, from early June 1962 till June 1965. The transcripts and notes of the recordings totaled 76,000 pages. These wiretaps were later ruled illegal by the courts. Owing to the President John F. Kennedy's hard crackdown on the mafia, Magaddino had a strong dislike of Kennedy. The wiretaps picked him up venting "They should kill the whole Kennedy family".

In 1963, Joseph Bonanno made plans to assassinate Magaddino and several rivals on the Mafia Commission, bosses Tommy Lucchese, Carlo Gambino, as well as Frank DeSimone. Bonanno sought Profaci crime family boss Joseph Magliocco's support, and Magliocco readily agreed due to his bitterness from being denied a seat on the Commission previously. Bonanno's audacious goal was to take over the Commission and make Magliocco his right hand man. Magliocco was assigned the task of killing Lucchese and Gambino, and gave the contract to one of his top hit men, Joseph Colombo. However, the opportunistic Colombo revealed the plot to its targets. The other bosses quickly realized that Magliocco could not have planned this himself. Remembering how close Bonanno was with Magliocco (and before him, Joe Profaci), as well as their close ties through marriages, the other bosses concluded Bonanno was the real mastermind. The Commission summoned Bonanno and Magliocco to explain themselves. Fearing for his life, Bonanno fled to Canada, leaving Magliocco to deal with the Commission, but was deported back to the United States.

In October 1964, Bonanno returned to Manhattan, but on October 20, 1964, the day before Bonanno was scheduled to testify to a grand jury inquiry, his lawyers said that after having dinner with them, Bonanno was kidnapped, allegedly by Magaddino's men, as he entered the apartment house where one of his lawyers lived on Park Avenue and East 36th Street.

Magaddino's empire began to crumble in 1968, when police found $500,000 stashed away in Magaddino's funeral home and his son's attic. Retired FBI agent Donald Hartnett said, "At that time, Magaddino had been telling his underlings that money was tight, and he could not afford to pay them Christmas bonuses... People began to stop trusting him when we found all that money."

== Death ==
Magaddino died of a heart attack on July 19, 1974, at age 82, at Mount Saint Mary's Hospital in Lewiston, New York. His funeral was held at St. Joseph's Catholic Church. He was buried at St. Joseph's Cemetery on Pine Avenue in Niagara Falls.

== Legacy ==
Mob Boss, written by Mike Hudson, is a book about Magaddino's life as a mob boss. Magaddino is also mentioned in Niagara Falls Confidential, also written by Mike Hudson. He also gets a passing mention in The Valachi Papers by Peter Maas. Magaddino, as head of the Buffalo/Niagara Falls crime family, is a subject throughout the two-volume history, DiCarlo: Buffalo's First Family of Crime (Vol. I through 1937, Vol. II 1938 through 2012) by Thomas Hunt and Michael A. Tona (2013).
