= Peter C. Rhodes =

American journalist and writer

Peter Christopher Rhodes (1909–1965) was an American journalist and writer who worked for the United Press news service and for the United States Office of War Information.

Rhodes in 1941

== Personal life ==
=== Family ===
Rhodes was born on September 18, 1909, the son of Christof Beutinger of Germany and Margaret Claire Abrahams of Jamaica, British West Indies. He had four siblings, Frederick, William, Margaret, and Marie. On July 12, 1916, their father was shot and killed by his wife in their Caldwell, New Jersey, home. The wife was tried for murder, pleaded self-defense, and was found innocent.

=== Marriage ===
Rhodes was married to Ione Boulenger, a teacher, in Brussels, Belgium, in 1936. Selective Service records showed that Rhodes claimed as dependents daughters Ann Margaret and Alice and a son, David. They lived in Knickerbocker Village, New York City, in 1941–43, and around 1946 they moved to Amenia, Dutchess County, New York.

Boulenger was general secretary of the Office International pour l'Enfance in 1938.

=== Death ===
Rhodes died in Monroe County, Florida, in September 1965.

== Education ==
Rhodes attended Columbia University between 1929 and 1933, when he received a bachelor's degree. He received a master's degree there in June 1934. He was rated as a "very good student, of excellent character and reputation." He then received a Kellett Fellowship of $2,000 at Oxford University, where he had an excellent record.

== Professional career ==
In late 1936 Rhodes worked for the New York Herald Tribune in Paris, and then he was employed in that city by United Press. He covered the early stages of the German invasion of France in 1940.

He also worked in London, Copenhagen and Stockholm. He was in Narvik, Norway, "when the first German destroyers steamed into the harbor and he reported exclusively the part played by the Norwegian commander in delivering the port to the Germans." Rhodes wrote a story for United Press recounting his 1940 travel across the Soviet Union on his way to Tokyo, Japan, where he was able to file a report. In August he worked in New York on the cable desk.

While awaiting reassignment, Rhodes spoke at a joint meeting of the Cincinnati Lodge of Elks and the Cincinnati Newspaperman's Club in September 1940. On October 24, 1940, Rhodes was guest speaker along with Publisher David Stern of the Camden Courier-Post at a meeting of the Camden Foremen's Club.

In 1941 he was assigned to the French island of Martinique, where he investigated reports about "a mountain of French gold" worth almost a billion dollars.

Upon his return to the United States, Rhodes was a speaker on February 28, 1941, at the Allentown, Pennsylvania, Chamber of Commerce, along with Governor Arthur James, where Rhodes said he disliked being called a journalist but would rather be referred to as a newspaperman.

Rhodes was next sent to England, where he covered the blitz.

Rhodes worked for United China Relief and the Federal Communications Commission in 1941, the Selective Service records showed.

In 1941, he was also chief of the Atlantic News Service of the Office of War Information, the U.S. State Department reported. Postwar he was with the OWI recruiting personnel "for operations in psychological warfare," where he trained workers "for newly liberated areas." He was described as "head of monitoring for Psychological Warfare Branch AFHQ [Air Force Headquarters] and later in a similar capacity with the ETO (European Theater of Operations, United States Army) during the war."

An article by Rhodes about French poet Louis Aragon was published in Aragon: Poet of the French Resistance, edited by Hannah Josephson and Malcolm Cowley in 1945. In 1946 Rinehart & Co. published his translation from the French of The Beast of the Haitian Hills by Philippe Thoby-Marcelin and Pierre Marcelin. His book Beautify Your Home Grounds, about property improvement, was published in 1952.

== Political position ==
On February 6, 1942, U.S. Representative Richard B. Wigglesworth, Republican of Massachusetts, included Rhodes in a list of names he read on the floor of the House of Representatives which he said had been furnished to him by the "[Martin] Dies Committee" (the House Committee on Un-American Activities) stating that Rhodes, listed as a "foreign editor," had been a delegate of the International Coordinating Committee for Aid to Republican Spain.

In June 1949, FBI informant Elizabeth Bentley included Rhodes, who was identified as a "broadcaster for the army in Africa and Sicily," in a list of names she furnished to the House Committee on Un-American Activities. She stated they were those of federal employees who had been "involved in giving information to the Soviet government."

John Lautner, a former Communist Party, official, told a subcommittee of the Senate Internal Security Committee in October 1952 that Rhodes, a "former Communist," had been "in charge of intelligence for the Military Government in the Mediterranean."

Winston Burdett, a broadcast journalist, testified at a hearing of the Senate Internal Security Subcommittee on June 28, 1955, that he "surmised" that Rhodes was a "very active Communist sympathizer and partisan of Communist causes." He said, "I did not know Peter Rhodes to be a member of the Communist Party." Burdett said he formed his impression from "my acquaintance with him and particularly his activities."
