= Richard Cantarella =

American mobster

- Born: December 19, 1944 (age 81); New York City, New York, U.S.
- Other name: "Shellackhead"
- Occupation: Mobster
- Spouse: Lauretta Castelli (m. 1965)
- Children: 3
- Relatives: Alfred Embarrato (uncle); Joseph D'Amico (cousin); Anthony Mirra (cousin)
- Allegiance: Bonanno crime family

Richard Cantarella (born December 19, 1944), also known as Shellackhead, is an American mobster who became a captain for the New York City-based Bonanno crime family and later a government witness.

== Biography ==
Cantarella was born to Italian parents on the Lower East Side, Manhattan and raised in Knickerbocker Village in Two Bridges, Manhattan, a public housing development that was home to many Bonanno family members. A skinny kid with jet-black hair, Cantarella got the name "Shellackhead" from his hair pomade. Cantarella was married to Lauretta Castelli and they had a son, Paul Cantarella.

As a young man, Cantarella was introduced to the Bonanno family by his uncle, mobster Alfred Embarrato. Embarrato controlled the distribution center for the New York Post through local union of newspaper workers. In 1963, Embarrato obtained a job for Cantarella at the Post as a delivery truck driver. However, Cantarella and his cousin, Bonanno mobster Joseph D'Amico, actually served as enforcers on the newspaper's loading docks, jobs they would perform for over thirty years. From 1988 until 1991, Cantarella was a so-called "tail man", a worker who rides on the back of the delivery truck and unloads the newspaper bundles. However, Cantarella never showed up for work; he paid a laborer $20 a night to do his job while Cantarella collected his $700 a week in wages.

== Mazzeo execution ==
During the late 1970s, Cantarella became involved in criminal activities with city employee Enrico P. “Rick” Mazzeo, the Director of Real Estate for the City of New York's Marine and Aviation Department. Mazzeo dispensed leases for newsstands and parking lots at the Staten Island Ferry Whitehall Terminal in Lower Manhattan and the St. George Terminal Staten Island in St. George, Staten Island. In return for granting leases to certain individuals, Mazzeo received large kickbacks. Cantarella told Mazzeo that a newspaper vendor at the Lower Manhattan terminal was operating an illegal sportsbook operation. This information allowed Mazzeo to break the vendor's lease and evict him. In return, Mazzeo installed Cantarella as the vendor's replacement. By the 1980s, Cantarella controlled newspaper stands in both terminals. Cantarella and Mazzeo became close friends and briefly shared an apartment in Upper Manhattan. The two men made hundreds of thousands of dollars on their lease scams.

In 1983, Mazzeo lost his job as director, was convicted of tax evasion charges, and sent to jail for six months. Mazzeo started using illegal drugs and Cantarella started worrying that Mazzeo might become a government witness. After consulting with other Bonanno members, Cantarella decided to murder Mazzeo. On the evening of Nov. 14, 1983, Cantarella, Embarrato, D'Amico, and Patrick Romanello met Mazzeo at a sanitation garage in Bushwick, Brooklyn. Mazzeo was meeting them at the upstairs garage office about a possible job. As the men walked down the stairs, Cantarella shot Mazzeo in the head. After shooting and stabbing the body several times, they loaded it into a black plastic bag and dumped it. Mazzeo's body was discovered five days later.

== Mirra execution ==
In 1981, the Bonanno family was rocked by the revelation that one of their associates, Donnie Brasco, was actually a Federal Bureau of Investigation (FBI) undercover agent named Joseph Pistone. Cantarella's cousin Anthony Mirra was among those responsible for introducing Brasco into the family. After the family executed capo Dominick Napolitano, another Brasco friend, the terrified Mirra went into hiding.

Joseph Massino ordered Mirra's two cousins Joseph D'Amico and Cantarella, and their uncle Alfred Embarrato, to kill Mirra. On February 18, 1982, D'Amico, lured him to a parking garage in Lower Manhattan. Embarrato and Cantarella were waiting in a getaway car. The pair went to the parking garage, climbed into Mirra's car, and drove up to a locked security gate. D'Amico would later describe in a testimony, "He took out his key, put it in the box, but he didn’t get a chance to turn the box... I shot him at close range several times on the side of his head."

== Family crime wave ==
Beginning in 1991, Cantarella started using his son as an accomplice in many of his criminal operations. In 1994, Cantarella and other mobsters kidnapped a wealthy businessman at his office, drove him home, forced him to deactivate the burglar alarm system, and robbed him of cash, jewelry and other valuables. They also forced the victim to start paying protection money to Cantarella.

Cantarella also extorted $250,000 from another businessman, using part of the money to purchase a Pontiac convertible automobile for Lauretta.

== Perrino execution ==
In 1992, the State of New York started investigating allegations of racketeering and fraud at the New York Post. The target was the Bonanno family and its control of the newspaper. During the investigation, the family became concerned that Robert Perrino, a delivery superintendent at the paper, would cooperate with prosecutors. Perrino had been operating a number of criminal scams at the Post, victimizing both fellow employees and the company. Perrino's main contact with the Bonanno family was Salvatore Vitale.

Vitale approached Cantarella and asked him if he would murder Perrino. Vitale suggested to Cantarella that he could take Perrino's job at the Post. Cantarella, a lifelong friend to Perrino, raised no objections. Vitale then told Bonanno consigliere Anthony Spero that Cantarella wanted to eliminate Perrino. Spero gave Cantarella permission. On May 5, 1992, Perrino was lured to a Bonanno club in Bensonhurst, where he was murdered. In December 2003, Perrino's skeleton was excavated from the floor of a construction company in Staten Island. Perrino had been shot multiple times to the head.

Cantarella was eventually convicted of grand larceny for his "no show" job at the Post and served seven months in prison.

== Government witness ==
With Vitale's conviction in 2001, Cantarella became Massino's trusted confidant and liaison between Massino and other captains. Unknown to Cantarella, however, he had become a target of an unorthodox FBI investigation. Jack Stubing, the head of the FBI's Bonanno Squad, had been at a loss to find a way to bring down Massino. He ultimately persuaded his bosses to let him borrow Jeff Sallet and Kim McCaffrey, a pair of forensic accountants normally used on fraud cases, believing that they could pinpoint participants in the family's money laundering schemes. He believed that enough conspirators would be frightened by the prospect of long prison terms that they would easily be willing to cooperate.

After two years, the effort paid off when McCaffrey and Sallet discovered that Massino, Vitale and Cantarella were partners in several parking lots owned by parking lot mogul Barry Weinberg. Cantarella's stake was held in the name of his wife, Lauretta. The Bonanno Squad put Weinberg under surveillance, and discovered Weinberg and one of his friends, restaurant owner Augustino Scozzari, frequently met with Cantarella and his crew. While this was going on, McCaffrey and Sallet found evidence that Weinberg hadn't filed tax returns in over a decade—in the process, evading over $1 million in taxes. They collared him in January 2001 and told him that he was headed to prison unless he turned state's evidence and obtained evidence against Bonanno mobsters. While being debriefed, Weinberg revealed that Cantarella had wrung a total of $1.25 million in extortion payoffs from him—much of it laundered through Scozzari's restaurant. Confronted by the FBI, Scozzari also agreed to become an informant.

Over the next few months, Weinberg and Scozzari recorded over 100 tapes of incriminating statements from Cantarella and his crew. While Cantarella broke off contact with Weinberg in the fall of 2001, he continued talking freely with Scozzari well into the summer of 2002—presumably because Scozzari was Italian. While talking with Scozzari, Cantarella made several incriminating statements about Massino.

Largely on the strength of Weinberg and Scozzari's tapes, on October 2, 2002, Cantarella was arrested and indicted on a 24-count RICO indictment. Among the specific acts were the Perrino murder, arson, kidnapping, loansharking, extortion, illegal gambling, and money laundering. Lauretta and Paul Cantarella were also indicted on racketeering charges.

While in prison, Cantarella learned that capo Frank Coppa, also arraigned in the October roundup, had become the first member of the Bonanno family ever to become an informant. Coppa told investigators that Cantarella had bragged about his role in setting up the Perrino hit, as well as being the getaway driver in the Mirra hit. Realizing that Coppa's testimony would all but assure that he would die in prison, in December 2002, Cantarella accepted a plea bargain deal and became a government witness. Lauretta and Paul also accepted plea deals. In early 2003, Massino realized that Cantarella had become an informant.

In June 2004, Cantarella testified at Massino's racketeering trial. Earlier, he'd told investigators that Massino was displeased with Vitale and wanted him whacked. On the stand, he admitted his own role in the 1983 Mazzeo killing. Also in 2004, Cantarella testified that he attended the Bonanno family induction ceremony for Perry Criscitelli, who was then the president of the Feast of San Gennaro Association. In July 2007, Cantarella testified at the murder and racketeering trial of Bonanno mobster Vincent Basciano.

== Leaving Witness Protection ==
In April 2017, Oxygen Channel launched Unprotected, a reality television program starring the Cantarella family, chronicling their attempt to start their lives over again after having opted out of Witness Protection.
