= Baldassare Amato =

Sicilian gangster

- Born: December 15, 1951 (age 74); Castellammare del Golfo, Sicily, Italy
- Other name: "Baldo"
- Occupations: Mobster, delicatessen owner
- Known for: Member of the Bonanno Mafia family, involvement in the assassination of Carmine Galante, sentenced to life for murder
- Relatives: Cesare Bonventre (cousin)
- Status: Incarcerated
- Allegiance: Bonanno crime family
- Convictions: Drug Trafficking (1987); Murder, racketeering, conspiracy, and illegal gambling (2006)
- Penalty: Five years' imprisonment (1987); Life Imprisonment and fined $250,000 (2006)

Baldassare Amato (born December 15, 1951) is a Sicilian gangster and a member of the Bonanno Mafia family in New York City. He was a cousin of Bonanno crime family capo Cesare Bonventre. At age 18, he emigrated from Castellammare del Golfo, Italy, to New York City, US and lived at 199 Avenue South Prospect Lefferts Gardens. He was one of two bodyguards to Carmine Galante who allegedly lured their own boss to the scene of his assassination in 1979. The New York Times correspondent Ralph Blumenthal describes Amato as "...looking like a fierce Alain Delon, darkly handsome, a wave of thick black hair, deep-set sparkling eyes, full, sensuous lips." He told police that he was a delicatessen owner.

In 2006, he was sentenced to life in prison for the 1992 murders of Sebastiano DiFalco and Robert Perrino. DiFalco was a restaurant owner, and prosecutors argued that Amato "removed" him to take over his business. The Bonannos were concerned that Perrino, a delivery supervisor for the New York Post, would expose their infiltration of the newspaper's delivery operations.
