= Alfred Embarrato =

American mobster (1909-2001)

Alfred "Al Walker" Embarrato (Note: Also sometimes written as Embaratto) (November 12, 1909 – February 21, 2001), also known as "Alfred Scalisi" a.k.a." Aldo Elvorado", was an American mobster who became a caporegime of the Bonanno crime family and a powerful labor figure at the New York Post distribution plant.

== Newspaperman ==
Born in Adrano to Salvatore Imbarrato and Maria from Sicily, Italy. Embarrato lived at Knickerbocker Village, on Monroe Street in Two Bridges, Manhattan. He was married to a woman named Constance and father of three children. One of Embarrato's neighbors was his nephew, Anthony Mirra, who became a widely feared soldier in the Bonanno family. Embarrato was employed at the New York Post from the 1960s to 1990s as a general foreman for the paper's distribution plant. When real estate owner Peter Kalikow bought the Post in 1988, his managers noted that Embarrato did no visible work and naively tried to fire him. When word of Embrrato's firing spread, the other Post foremen quickly agreed to take a salary cut so that Embarrato could keep his job. In 1990, District Attorney Robert Morgenthau began an extensive investigation of mob control at the New York newspapers, including the Post. Three years later, Embarrato was indicted on charges related to this investigation.

== Family dissension ==
In the late 1970s, Philip Rastelli became the boss of the Bonanno family, causing a major split in the membership. Philip Giaccone, Dominick Trinchera and Alphonse Indelicato opposed Rastelli and began plotting his downfall. However, Rastelli heard about the plot and instead arranged an ambush for the three conspirators. On May 5, 1981, the day of the ambush, Rastelli loyalist Dominick Napolitano asked Embarrato to come down to The Motion Lounge for a "sitdown". At the meeting, Napolitano placed two of his sidewalk soldiers next to Embarrato. The mobsters then waited until Napolitano received confirmation that Giaccone, Trichera, and Indelicato were dead. Later describing the meeting to Joseph D. Pistone, posing as mobster Donnie Brasco, Napolitano said, "When [he] Alfred heard that, he turned ash white. He thought we were going to hit him too. But I just reamed at him about Tony, told him Tony was no good; and that he [Alfred] better recognize that and act right himself." Embarrato agreed.

== Donnie Brasco ==
In mid-1981, when Pistone was revealed as an FBI agent, "Sonny Black" Napolitano, "Lefty" Ruggiero, and Mirra were all on the firing line for initially allowing the infiltration. Mirra, Embarrato's nephew, went into hiding. Joseph Massino ordered Embarrato and Mirra's two cousins Joseph D'Amico and Richard Cantarella, to kill him. On February 18, 1982, D'Amico, lured him to a parking garage in Lower Manhattan. Embarrato and Cantarella were waiting in a getaway car. The pair went to the parking garage, climbed into Mirra's car, and drove up to a locked security gate. D'Amico would later describe in a testimony, "He took out his key, put it in the box, but he didn’t get a chance to turn the box... I shot him at close range several times on the side of his head." In 1988, Embarrato was indicted along with other Bonanno leaders in a Racketeer Influenced and Corrupt Organizations Act case.

== Death ==
On February 21, 2001, Alfred Embarrato died of natural causes at the age of 91.
