= Giovanni Bonventre =

American mobster

Giovanni "John" Bonventre (April 18, 1901 – 1970s?) was a New York mobster with the Bonanno crime family.

== Early years ==
Born in Castellammare del Golfo, Sicily, Bonventre immigrated to New York with his family. The family settled in the Williamsburg, Brooklyn, a stronghold of immigrants from their village. Bonventre soon joined the local Castellammarese criminal organization, the precursor of the modern Bonanno crime family. Boss Cola Schiro ran the organization until 1930, when he was forced out by Salvatore Maranzano. Bonventre was the uncle of family founder Joseph Bonanno, who himself immigrated to New York City in 1924. Bonventre's nephews were Joseph Profaci, the future founder of the Profaci crime family and Cesare Bonventre. Bonventre married Caterina Vitale, but it is unknown if they had any children.

== Association with Bonanno family ==
With the end of the Castellammarese War, a major conflict between the Sicilian clans in New York, Bonanno became boss of the reorganized Bonanno family and Bonventre became a caporegime, the captain of a crew of mobsters. That same year, Bonanno and Bonventre purchased a dairy farm near Middletown, New York in the Catskill Mountains. The farm's main product was mozzarella cheese; Bonanno and Bonventre used their mob influence to eventually dominate the production of this cheese in New York State, Wisconsin, and Vermont. Bonventre's other business ventures included a garment factory in Brooklyn. At some point, Bonventre was promoted to family underboss, directly under Bonanno.

== Move to Sicily ==
In 1950, Bonventre decided to move back to Sicily. However, this move did not end his involvement in the Bonanno family. In 1957, Bonventre attended the abortive Apalachin Conference of American Cosa Nostra leaders in rural Apalachin, New York that was broken up by New York State Police; Bonanno and Bonventre were picked up by police as they tried to escape the meeting site through a field. In September 1957 Bonventre had attended several meetings in Palermo, Sicily with Bonanno and the exiled mob boss Charles "Lucky" Luciano.

In May 1971, Italian Carabinieri police banished Bonventre and 14 other Sicilian Mafia leaders to Filicudi, a 3-mile (4.8 km) island off the coast of Sicily.
