= Roccamena =

- Comune
- Comune di Roccamena
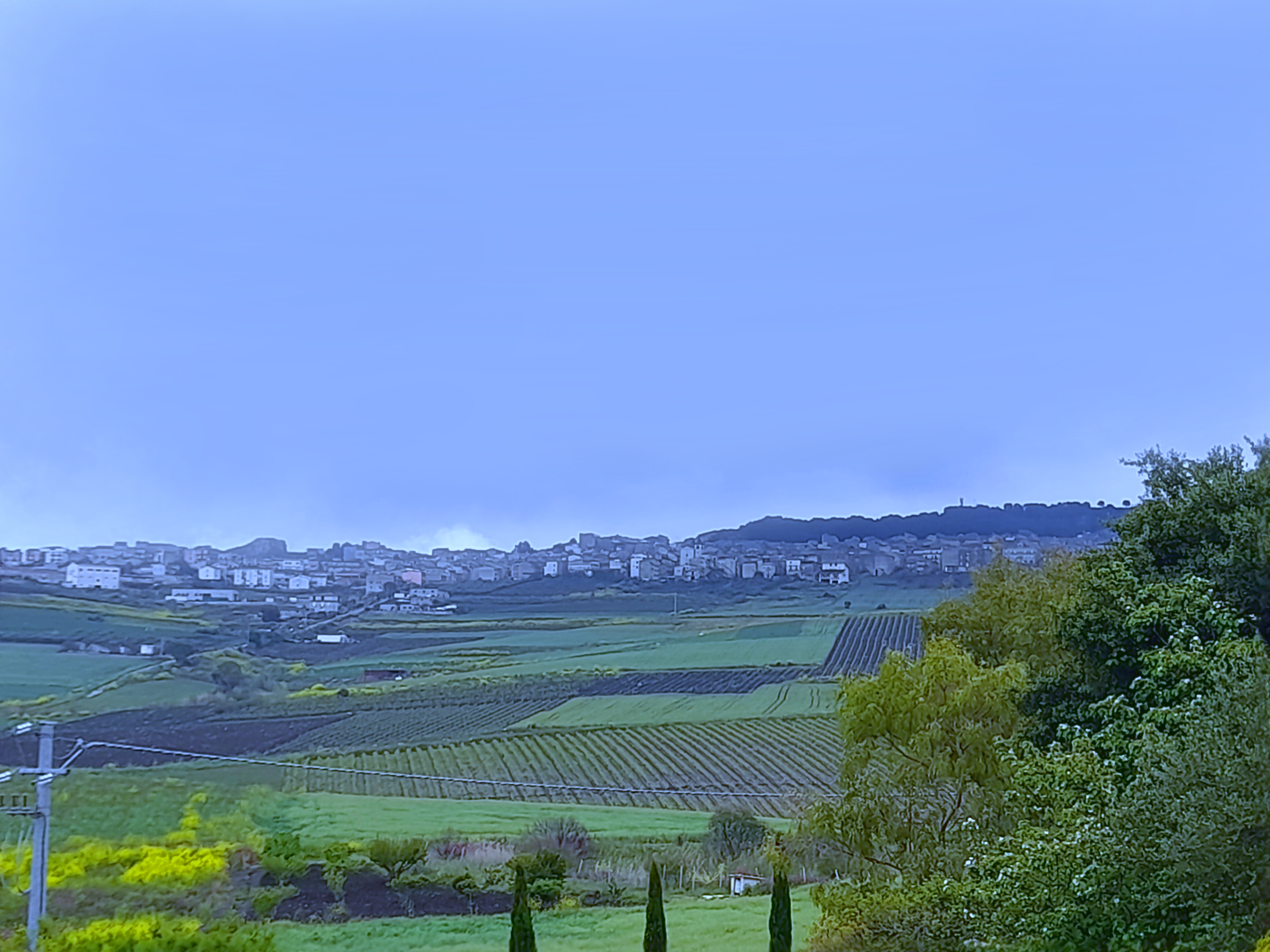

- Location within Italy Location within Sicily
- Coordinates: 37°50′N 13°9′E
- Country: Italy
- Region: Sicily
- Metropolitan city: Palermo (PA)

Area
  - Total: 33.3 km^{2} (12.9 sq mi)

Population (Dec. 2004)
  - Total: 1,669
  - Density: 50.1/km^{2} (130/sq mi)
- Time zone: UTC+1 (CET)
  - Summer (DST): UTC+2 (CEST)
- Postal code: 90040
- Dialing code: 091

Roccamena is a comune (municipality) in the Metropolitan City of Palermo in the Italian region Sicily, located about 35 kilometres (22 mi) southwest of Palermo. As of 31 December 2004, it had a population of 1,669 and an area of 33.3 square kilometres (12.9 mi^{2}).

Roccamena borders the following municipalities: Bisacquino, Contessa Entellina, Corleone, Monreale.

== Demographic evolution ==
Historical population

Year	Pop.	±%
1861	1,353	—
1871	1,633	+20.7%
1881	2,045	+25.2%
1901	2,388	+16.8%
1911	2,524	+5.7%

Year	Pop.	±%
1921	2,243	−11.1%
1931	2,542	+13.3%
1936	2,624	+3.2%
1951	3,284	+25.2%
1961	2,772	−15.6%

Year	Pop.	±%
1971	2,436	−12.1%
1981	2,100	−13.8%
1991	2,132	+1.5%
2001	1,793	−15.9%

Source: Data from ISTAT
