= Nicholas Marangello =

American mobster

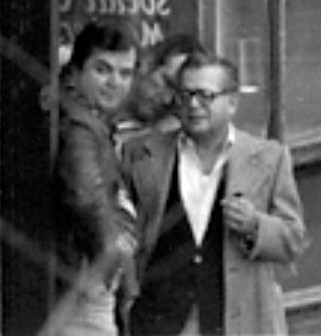
- Marangello (right) with Joseph Massino in a February 23, 1977 FBI surveillance photo

Nicholas Marangello (July 31, 1912 - December 30, 1999), also known as "Nicky Glasses", "Nicky Cigars", "Nicky the Butler" and "Little Nicky", was the underboss of the Bonanno crime family under Carmine Galante and saw himself demoted after Galante's death. He is the father-in-law of Robert Perrino and grandfather of Nicola Langora.
