= Cesare Bonventre =

American mobster

- Born: January 1, 1951; Castellammare del Golfo, Sicily, Italy
- Died: April 16, 1984 (aged 33); Wallington, Garfield, New Jersey, U.S.
- Cause of death: Gunshot wounds
- Other name: "The Tall Guy"
- Occupation: Caporegime
- Predecessor: Carmine Galante
- Successor: Baldassare Amato
- Spouse: Theresa A. Bonventre
- Children: 1
- Relatives: Giovanni Bonventre (uncle), Vito Bonventre (first cousin once removed), Joseph Bonanno (first cousin once removed), Baldassare Amato (cousin)
- Allegiance: Bonanno crime family

Cesare "The Tall Guy" Bonventre (January 1, 1951 – April 16, 1984) was a Sicilian gangster who served as a caporegime in the Bonanno crime family, operating out of Knickerbocker Avenue in Bushwick. Bonventre alongside Salvatore "Toto" Catalano led the Sicilian “Zips” faction of the family and was a key member of the Pizza Connection until his assassination on April 16, 1984 on orders of Joe Massino and Philip "Rusty" Rastelli.

== Early life ==
Born in Castellammare del Golfo, Sicily, Bonventre was a member of the Sicilian Mafia. During the 1960s, the New York crime families imported young Sicilian men from Sicily to the United States to work as drug traffickers and hitmen. American mobsters soon derisively dubbed the Sicilians "Zips" due to their fast speech. Bonanno acting boss (unofficial) Carmine Galante brought Bonventre to New York to be his bodyguard. Bonventre soon became the unofficial underboss of the Bonanno family Sicilians. Bonventre's uncle was John Bonventre, a former Bonanno underboss. Bonventre was also a cousin of the first family boss Joseph Bonanno and Bonanno mobster Baldassare "Baldo" Amato. In 1979, Cesare and Baldassare were arrested for carrying illegal firearms in their car after being stopped by police at the Green Acres Mall in Valley Stream, New York, shortly before the execution of Carmine Galante. In April 1981, they were convicted and served two months. Ralph Blumenthal wrote in Last Days of the Sicilians: The FBI's War Against the Mafia that Cesare identified himself to law enforcement as "a pizza man from Brooklyn".

He was a regular habituate of his cousin Baldassare Amato's deli run by his family located at Second Avenue and Eighty-fourth Street in Yorkville, New York. The deli had burned down not long before January 1984 but in its place the Amato family built an apartment building with a sleek Italian cafe and restaurant called Biffi. Bonventre's moniker was "The Tall Guy" because he was almost six feet seven inches (2.01 m) tall. Lean and handsome, Bonventre frequented clubs such as The Toyland Social Club and the Knickerbocker Avenue area with other Sicilian mobsters. In the book King of the Godfathers, Anthony M. Destefano wrote that there was something about Bonventre that made him stand out from the other ethnic Italians. His stylish clothing, aviator sunglasses and European man purses embodied Italian couture. Bonventre normally wore his shirt unbuttoned with a gold crucifix hanging from his neck.

== Galante assassination ==
Galante was allegedly murdered for not sharing his drug trafficking profits with the family. The hit on Galante required Philip "Rusty" Rastelli to get approval from the Zips, Gambino crime family boss Paul Castellano and the other Commission bosses. It was later rumored that the Mafia Commission, which oversees all the crime families, had sanctioned Galante's murder and arranged for Bonventre and Baldo, Galante's bodyguards, to betray him.

On July 12, 1979, Bonventre, living in 2042 83rd Street in New Utrecht, Brooklyn, allegedly participated in the murders of Galante and two of his friends. He had been dropped off for lunch at Joe & Mary's, an Italian restaurant in the Bushwick section of Brooklyn. After a short while, bodyguards Bonventre and Baldo Amato joined Galante. Although it was a hot summer day and they were dining on the patio, both Bonventre and Amato wore leather jackets, presumably to protect themselves from stray bullets and debris. Suddenly, three men in ski masks appeared on the patio and opened fire on Galante. Bonventre and Amato allegedly joined in the attack, then disappeared from the scene after the three hitmen. Galante and his two lunch companions died. A week after the Galante murders, Bonventre was arrested by federal agents, but he was soon released and was never charged with the crime.

== Rise to power ==
Philip "Rusty" Rastelli succeeded Galante as boss of the family, even though he was incarcerated at the time and Joseph Massino became underboss, although some believed Massino was the real power in the family. After Galante's death, Bonventre was promoted from soldier to capo and joined Salvatore Catalano's Brooklyn crew. At 28, Bonventre became the youngest capo in Bonanno family history. Bonventre became involved in the importation and drug trafficking of heroin from Sicily into New York pizza parlors, known as the "Pizza Connection".

Bonventre had been on the side of the three capos Alphonse "Sonny Red" Indelicato, Philip Giaccone and Dominick Trinchera, a family faction who were planning a coup to take over the family; however, Bonventre switched sides, joining Rastelli's faction. If Bonventre and the Zips had stayed loyal to Indelicato, he would have probably taken over the Bonanno family. The ascension of Rastelli as boss triggered a period of discontent and rivalry in the Bonanno family. As a result, Rastelli and Massino started purging their opponents in the family.

In 1984, Massino decided to eliminate Bonventre. Bonventre's pedigree, increasing wealth and fearsome reputation had made him a threat to Massino's leadership. Bonventre controlled the Sicilians, the most fearsome and reliable killers in the family. Bonventre was prone to outbursts of sadistic violence and was suspected of over 20 murders. Massino warned, "He's a very sharp guy. You have to be careful."

== Assassination ==
In April 1984, Bonanno mobsters Salvatore Vitale and Louis Attanasio picked up Bonventre to bring him to a meeting with Rastelli at a glue factory in Wallington, New Jersey. As Vitale drove the car into the factory, Attanasio shot Bonventre twice in the head. Surprisingly, Bonventre still struggled; grabbing the steering wheel and trying to crash the car, forcing the two hitmen to fight him off. As Vitale steered into the garage, Bonventre crawled out of the car. Louis Attanasio then killed him on the garage floor with two more shots. Bonventre's body was hacked to pieces and dumped into three 55-gallon glue drums. The killers then moved the drums to the fourth floor offices of a trading company in Garfield, New Jersey.

On April 9, 1984, unaware that Bonventre was dead, a federal grand jury indicted him and 12 other men on charges of distributing narcotics through the pizza restaurants, in the so-called "Pizza Connection" case. On April 16, 1984, the remains were discovered, in a warehouse in Garfield, New Jersey, stuffed into two 55-gallon glue drums. Bonventre's widow gave birth to their only son after the murder.

=== Aftermath ===
Soon after the murder, a government informant later claimed that one of Bonventre's killers was Bonanno mobster Cosimo Aiello. However, in October 1984, Aiello was shot to death in the parking lot of a Clifton, New Jersey restaurant. In January 2004, nearly 20 years after the Bonventre murder, federal authorities arrested Louis Attanasio, Peter Calabrese and Louis's brother, Robert Attanasio. Now a government witness, Vitale testified against them. On September 20, 2006, after being convicted of murder, Louis Attanasio and Calabrese were sentenced to 15 years' imprisonment. Robert Attanasio, who had cleaned up the murder car, received 10 years' imprisonment.
