= Daniel Leo =

Daniel Leo may refer to:

- Daniel Leo (rugby union) (born 1982), Samoan rugby player
- Daniel Leo (mobster) (born 1941), American mobster
- Daniel Leo (footballer) (born 2001), Swiss footballer
- Dan Leo (born 1950), Australian politician
