= Federico Giovanelli =

American mobster

Federico "Fritzy" Giovanelli (March 27, 1932 – January 19, 2018) was a New York mobster and a caporegime in the Genovese crime family.

== Career ==
Federico Giovanelli's real last name was Giovanniello but shortened due to his uncle and cousin who both did so when they were boxing. Giovanelli is of Neapolitan descent and began as a small time criminal who had participated in loansharking, bookmaking, and illegal gambling. After becoming a capo in the Genovese crime family he aligned himself with the family's skippers, including boss Vincent Gigante. Giovanelli claimed Gigante was "the biggest cheater" he knew at card games.

In 1985, Giovanelli was taped having a conversation with retired Brooklyn Democratic party leader Meade Esposito, which eventually led to corruption charges against Esposito and Congressman Mario Biaggi of the Bronx.

On January 21, 1986, 34 year old undercover New York City police officer Anthony Venditti was shot twice in the head and killed while following Giovanelli with his partner, Detective Kathleen Burke, during an investigation. Giovanelli was charged with the murder. Burke testified that Giovanelli had shot at her, though Giovanelli denied she was a witness to the scene.

The first trial in the summer of 1987 ended in deadlock after Burke was combative and testy under the defense lawyers' questioning. The second trial in 1988 also ended in deadlock after a major prosecution witness withdrew the part of his testimony in which he had said Carmine Gualtiere was one of the gunmen who had killed Detective Venditti.

In 2005, Giovanelli began serving a 10-year sentence for obstruction of justice after alerting DeCavalcante members in 1999 that they were about to be indicted.

== Death ==
Giovanelli died on January 19, 2018, at the age of 85 after a battle with illness.
