= Genovese crime family =

Italian-American organized crime group

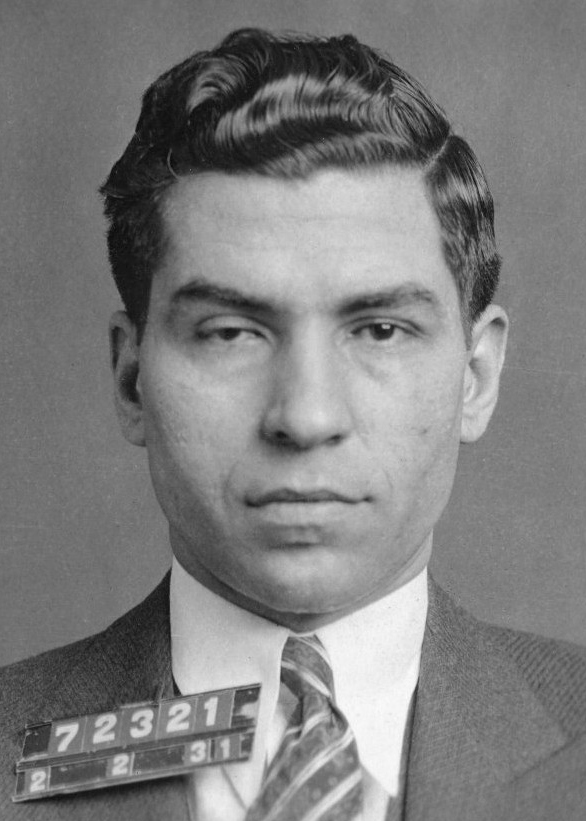
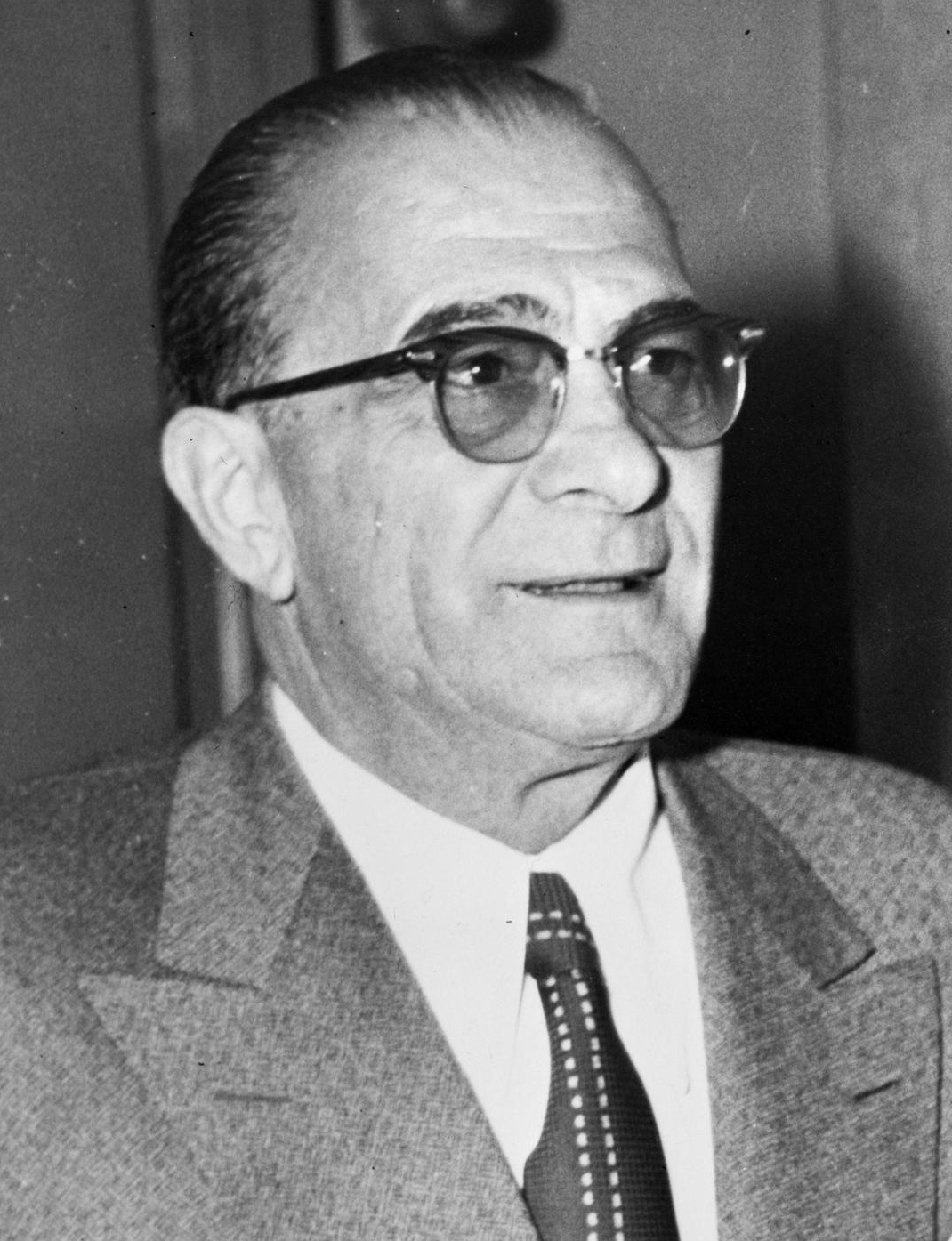
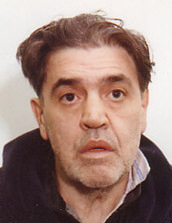
- Lucky Luciano Vito Genovese Vincent Gigante
- Founded: c. 1890s
- Founder: Charles Luciano
- Named after: Vito Genovese
- Founding location: New York City, New York, United States
- Years active: c. 1890s–present
- Territory: Primarily the New York metropolitan area, including Long Island, Westchester County and New Jersey, with additional territory in Upstate New York, Hartford, New Haven and Springfield, as well as Las Vegas, Los Angeles and South Florida
- Ethnicity: Italians as "made men" and other ethnicities as associates
- Membership (est.): 300 made members (1990); 250–300 made members and 1,000+ associates (2004); 175 made members (2021)
- Activities: Racketeering, gambling, bookmaking, loansharking, extortion, labor union infiltration, drug trafficking, firearm trafficking, truck hijacking, auto theft, fraud, money laundering, bribery, prostitution, pornography, assault, and murder
- Allies: Bonanno crime family; Bufalino crime family; Buffalo crime family; Chicago Outfit; Cleveland crime family; Colombo crime family; Dallas crime family; DeCavalcante crime family; Detroit Partnership; Gambino crime family; Lucchese crime family; New Orleans crime family; Patriarca crime family; Philadelphia crime family; Pittsburgh crime family; Trafficante crime family; Hells Angels MC; Latin Kings; Nucky Johnson's Organization; Pagan's MC; Purple Gang
- Rivals: Various gangs in New York City, including their allies

The Genovese crime family (Italian: [dʒenoˈveːze, -eːse]), also sometimes referred to as the Westside, is an Italian American Mafia crime family and one of the "Five Families" that dominate organized crime activities in New York City and New Jersey as part of the American Mafia. The Genovese family is the oldest and the largest of New York's Five Families, and was the first of the New York families to expand into New Jersey. The Genovese family has also generally maintained a varying degree of influence over many of the smaller Mafia families outside New York, including ties with the Philadelphia, Cleveland, Patriarca, and Buffalo crime families.

The modern family was founded by Charles "Lucky" Luciano and was known as the Luciano crime family from 1931 to 1957, when Vito Genovese became boss. Genovese was head of the family during the McClellan hearings in 1963, which gave the Five Families their current names. Originally in control of the waterfront on the West Side of Manhattan as well as the docks and the Fulton Fish Market on the East River waterfront, the family was run between 1981 and 2005 by "The Oddfather", Vincent "Chin" Gigante, who feigned insanity by shuffling unshaven through New York's Greenwich Village wearing a tattered bath robe and muttering to himself incoherently to avoid prosecution. Finding new ways to make money in the 21st century, the family took advantage of lax due diligence by banks during the housing bubble with a wave of mortgage frauds. Prosecutors say loan shark victims obtained home equity loans to pay off debts to their mob bankers. The family found ways to use new technology to improve on illegal gambling, with customers placing bets through offshore sites via the Internet. Although the leadership of the Genovese family seemed to have been in limbo after the death of Gigante in 2005, sources believe that Liborio "Barney" Bellomo is the current boss of the organization.

The Federal Bureau of Investigation (FBI) considers the Genovese family the most powerful of the Five Families. The organization is the most formidable, sophisticated, secretive, and wealthiest Mafia family in the United States. The Genovese family has maintained an ability to operate white-collar crime rackets such as construction and labor racketeering as other crime families were weakened and reduced to street-level, blue-collar crime rackets. The family is unique in today's Mafia, and has benefited greatly from members following omertà, a code of conduct emphasizing secrecy and non-cooperation with law enforcement and the justice system. While many mobsters from across the country have testified against their crime families since the 1980s, the Genovese family has had only eleven members and associates turn state's evidence in its history. Detective Joseph J. Coffey of the New York Organized Crime Task Force described the Genovese family as "the Ivy League of the underworld".

== History ==
=== Origins ===
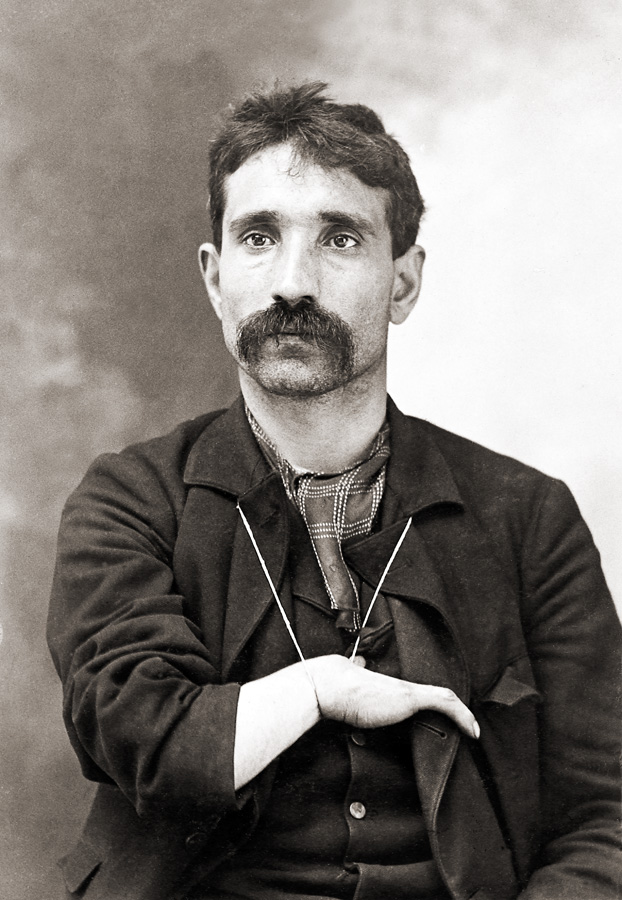
Giuseppe Morello

The Genovese crime family originated from the Morello gang of East Harlem, the first Mafia family in New York City. In 1892, Giuseppe Morello arrived in New York from the village of Corleone, Sicily, Italy. Morello's half-brothers Nicholas, Vincenzo, Ciro, and the rest of his family joined him in New York the following year. The Morello brothers formed the 107th Street Mob and began dominating the Italian neighborhood of East Harlem, parts of Manhattan, and the Bronx.

One of Giuseppe Morello's strongest allies was Ignazio "the Wolf" Lupo, a mobster who controlled Manhattan's Little Italy. In 1903, Lupo married Morello's half-sister, uniting both organizations. The Morello-Lupo alliance continued to prosper in 1903, when the group began a major counterfeiting ring with powerful Sicilian mafioso Vito Cascioferro, printing $5 bills in Sicily and smuggling them into the US.

New York police detective Joseph Petrosino, later assassinated while in Sicily seeking evidence to permit the deportation of Morello and other mafiosi, began investigating the Morello family's counterfeiting operation, the barrel murders, and the black hand extortion letters. On November 15, 1909, Morello, Lupo, and others were arrested on counterfeiting charges. In February 1910, Morello and Lupo were sentenced to twenty-five and thirty years in prison, respectively.

In 1910 the Lomonte Brothers, cousins of Morello, ran East Harlem until 1915. Fortunato Lomonte was shot and killed in 1914 on East 108th st. Tomasso Lomonte and cousin Rose Lomonte were both shot and killed in 1915 on East 116th st.

=== Mafia-Camorra War ===
As the Morello family increased in power and influence, bloody territorial conflicts arose with other Italian gangs in New York. The Morellos had an alliance with Giosue Gallucci, a prominent East Harlem businessman and Camorrista with local political connections. On May 17, 1915, Gallucci was murdered in a power struggle between the Morellos and the Neapolitan Camorra organization, which consisted of two Brooklyn gangs run by Pellegrino Morano and Alessandro Vollero. The fight over Gallucci's rackets became known as the Mafia-Camorra War.

After months of fighting, Morano offered a truce. A meeting was arranged at a Navy Street cafe owned by Vollero. On September 7, 1916, Nicholas Morello and his bodyguard Charles Ubriaco were ambushed and killed upon arrival by five members of the Camorra gang. In 1917, Morano was charged with Morello's murder after Camorrista Ralph Daniello implicated him in the murder. By 1918, law enforcement had sent many Camorra members to prison, decimating the Camorra in New York and ending the war. Many of the remaining Camorra members joined the Morello family.

The Morellos now faced stronger rivals than the Camorra. With the passage of Prohibition in 1920 and the ban of alcohol sales, the family regrouped and built a lucrative bootlegging operation in Manhattan. In 1920, both Morello and Lupo were released from prison and Brooklyn Mafia boss Salvatore D'Aquila ordered their murders. This is when Giuseppe "Joe" Masseria and Umberto Valenti, an enforcer working for Salvatore D'Aquila, began to fight for control of the Morello family.

On December 29, 1920, Masseria's men murdered Valenti's ally, Salvatore Mauro. Then, on May 8, 1922, the Valenti gang murdered Vincenzo Terranova. Masseria's gang retaliated killing Morello member Silva Tagliagamba. On August 11, 1922, Masseria's men murdered Valenti, ending the conflict, as Masseria took over the Morello family. Salvatore D'Aquila relocated to the Bronx until Masseria had him killed in 1928.

=== The Castellammarese era ===
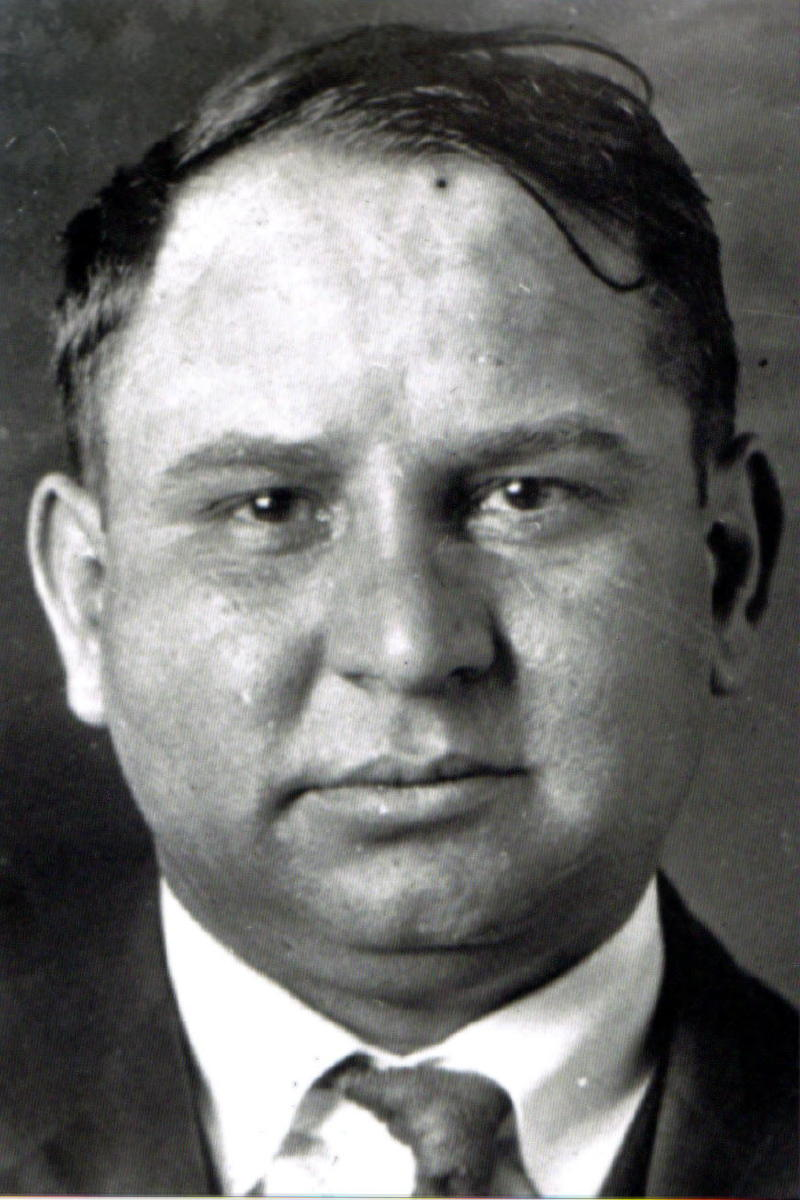
Joe Masseria

During the mid-1920s, Masseria continued to expand his bootlegging, extortion, loansharking, and illegal gambling rackets throughout New York. To operate and protect these rackets, he recruited many ambitious young mobsters, including future heavyweights Charles "Lucky" Luciano, Frank Costello, Joseph "Joey A" Adonis, Vito Genovese, and Albert Anastasia. Luciano soon became a top aide in Masseria's organization.

By the late 1920s, Masseria's main rival was boss Salvatore Maranzano, who had come from Sicily to run the Castellammarese clan. Their rivalry eventually escalated into the bloody Castellammarese War. As the war turned against Masseria, Luciano, seeing an opportunity to switch allegiance, decided to eliminate him in 1931. In a secret deal with Maranzano, Luciano agreed to engineer Masseria's death in return for taking over his rackets and becoming Maranzano's second-in-command.

Adonis had joined the Masseria faction, and when Masseria heard about Luciano's betrayal, he approached Adonis about killing Luciano. However, Adonis instead warned Luciano about the murder plot.

On April 15, 1931, Masseria was killed at Nuova Villa Tammaro, a Coney Island restaurant, while playing cards with Luciano, who allegedly excused himself to use the bathroom, when four gunmen (Anastasia, Genovese, Adonis, and Benjamin "Bugsy" Siegel) shot Masseria to death, then escaping in a car driven by Ciro "The Artichoke King" Terranova. It was reported that Terranova was too nervous to drive, so Siegel took the driver's seat and drove the car out of the crime scene.

With Maranzano's blessing, Luciano became his lieutenant and took over Masseria's gang, ending the Castellammarese War. Between August 1 and 3, 1931, Maranzano called a meeting where crime bosses met at Nuova Villa Tammaro in Coney Island for a bacchanalian banquet to celebrate the death of Masseria right on the spot where he was murdered and another one on Washington Avenue at a hall in the Bronx. Maranzano called another meeting of crime bosses in Wappingers Falls, New York, where he declared himself capo di tutti capi ("boss of all bosses"). Under Maranzano rule the Italian-American gangs in New York City were reorganized into Five Families headed by Luciano, Joe Profaci, Tommy Gagliano, Vincent Mangano, and himself. Maranzano also whittled down the rival families' rackets in favor of his own. Luciano appeared to accept these changes, but was merely biding his time before removing Maranzano. Although Maranzano was slightly more forward-thinking than Masseria, Luciano had come to believe that Maranzano was even more greedy, power-hungry and hidebound than Masseria had been.

By September 1931, Maranzano realized Luciano was a threat, and hired Vincent "Mad Dog" Coll, an Irish gangster, to kill him. However, Tommy Lucchese alerted Luciano that he was marked for death. On September 10, Maranzano ordered Luciano, Genovese, and Costello to come to his office at the 230 Park Avenue in Manhattan. Convinced that Maranzano planned to murder them, Luciano decided to take pre-emptive action. He sent to Maranzano's office four Jewish gangsters, secured with the aid of Siegel and Meyer Lansky, whose faces were unknown to Maranzano's people. Disguised as government agents, two of the gangsters disarmed Maranzano's bodyguards. The other two, aided by Lucchese, stabbed Maranzano multiple times before shooting him.

=== Luciano and the Commission ===
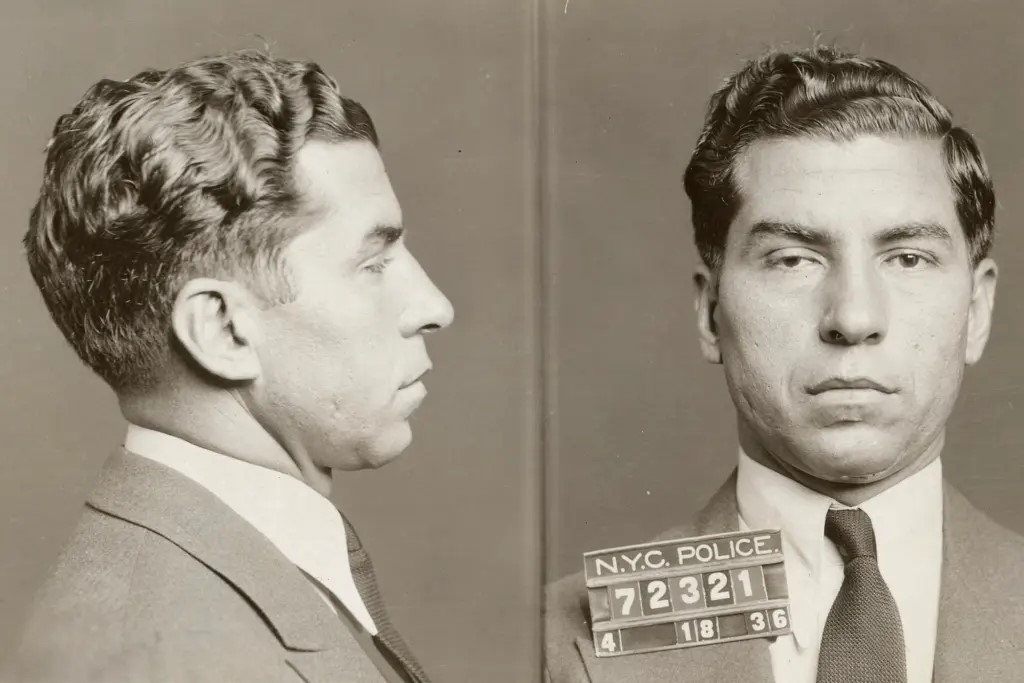
"Lucky" Luciano's mugshot

After Maranzano's murder, Luciano called a meeting in Chicago with various bosses, where he proposed a Commission to serve as the governing body for organized crime. Designed to settle all disputes and decide which families controlled which territories, the Commission has been called Luciano's greatest innovation. Luciano's goals with the Commission were to quietly maintain his own power over all the families, and to prevent future gang wars; the bosses approved the idea of the Commission.

The Commission's first test came in 1935, when they ordered Dutch Schultz to drop his plans to murder Special Prosecutor Thomas E. Dewey. Luciano argued that an assassination of Dewey would precipitate a massive law enforcement crackdown. An enraged Schultz vowed to kill Dewey anyway and walked out of the meeting.

Anastasia, now the leader of Murder, Inc., approached Luciano with information that Schultz had asked him to stake out Dewey's apartment building on Fifth Avenue. Upon hearing the news, the Commission held a discreet meeting to discuss the matter. After six hours of deliberations, the Commission ordered Lepke Buchalter to eliminate Schultz. On October 23, 1935, before he could kill Dewey, Schultz was shot in a tavern in Newark, New Jersey, and succumbed to his injuries the following day.

On May 13, 1936, Luciano's pandering trial began. Dewey prosecuted the case that Eunice Carter had built against Luciano, accusing him of being part of a massive prostitution ring known as "the Combination". During the trial, Dewey exposed Luciano for lying on the witness stand through direct quizzing and records of telephone calls.

Dewey's case against Luciano on the prostitution charges actually leveled in the indictment, on the other hand, rested on much shakier ground: first on the testimony of Joe Bendix, who was discredited by his own testimony as well as that of others, and then later on the testimony of three prostitutes, whom Dewey rewarded by either paying for a trip to Europe after the trial or arranging for lucrative film and magazine deals. All three witnesses subsequently recanted their testimony.

On June 7, 1936, Luciano was convicted on 62 counts of compulsory prostitution. On June 18, he was sentenced to thirty to fifty years in state prison, along with David Betillo and others.

Luciano continued to run his crime family from prison, relaying his orders through Genovese, his acting boss. However, in 1937, Genovese fled to Naples to avoid an impending indictment for murder in New York. Luciano appointed Costello, his consigliere, as the new acting boss and overseer of Luciano's interests.

During World War II, federal agents came to Luciano for help in preventing enemy sabotage on the New York waterfront and other activities. Luciano agreed to help, in return for a pardon from the State of New York, made contingent on Luciano's deportation to Italy. In reality Luciano provided insignificant assistance to the Allied cause.

After the end of the war, the arrangement with Luciano became public knowledge. To prevent further embarrassment, the government followed through on its plans to deport Luciano on condition that he never return to the U.S. In 1946, Luciano was taken from prison and deported to Italy, where he died in 1962.

=== The Prime Minister ===
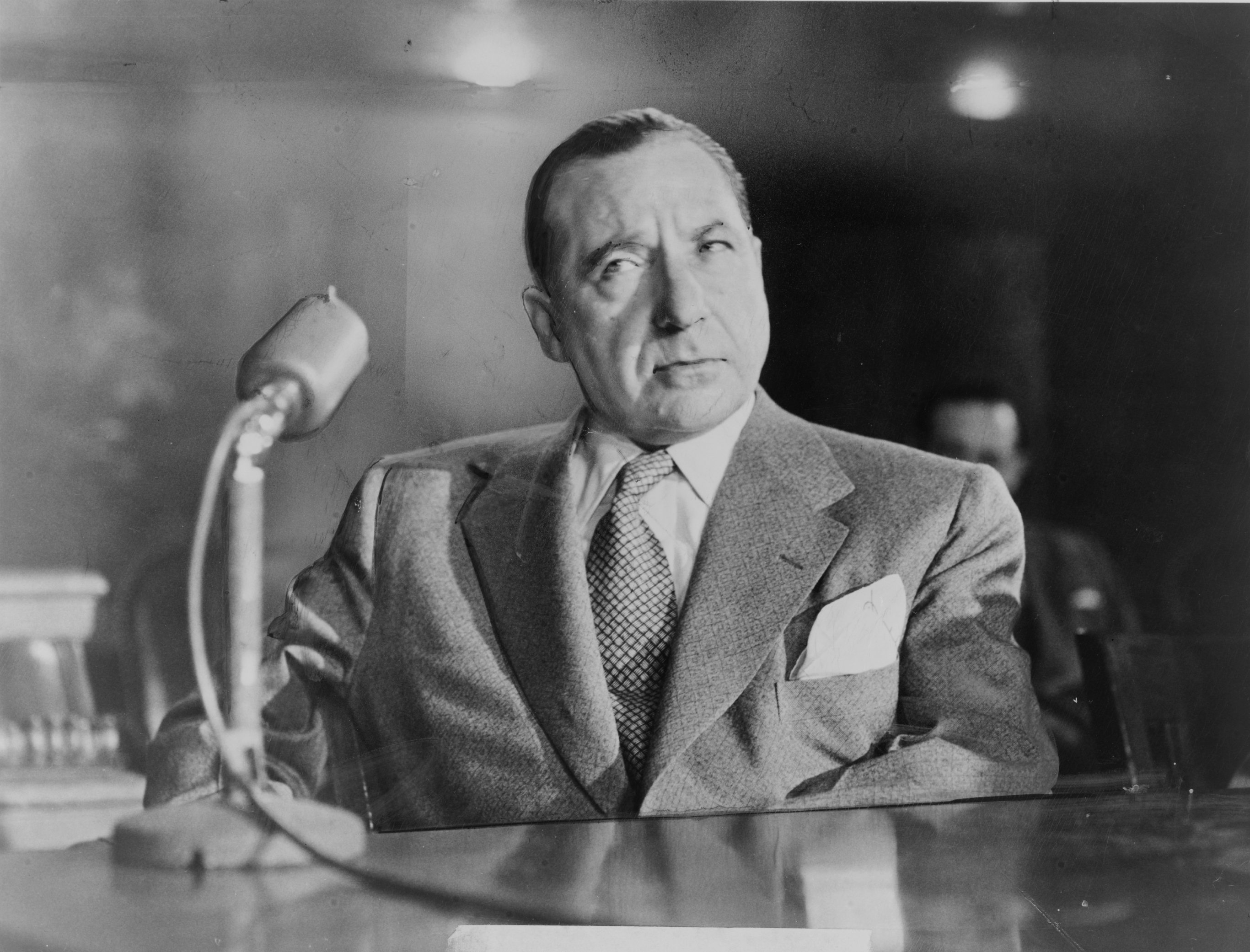
Frank Costello at the Kefauver hearings

From May 1950 to May 1951, the U.S. Senate conducted a large-scale investigation of organized crime, commonly known as the Kefauver Hearings, chaired by Senator Estes Kefauver of Tennessee. Costello was convicted of contempt of the Senate and sentenced to eighteen months in prison. Kefauver concluded that New York politician Carmine DeSapio was assisting the activities of Costello, and that Costello had become influential in decisions made by the Tammany Hall political machine. DeSapio admitted to having met Costello several times, but insisted that "politics was never discussed".

In 1952, the federal government began proceedings to strip Costello of his U.S. citizenship and he was indicted for evasion of $73,417 in income taxes between 1946 and 1949. He was sentenced to five years in prison and fined $20,000. In 1954, Costello appealed the conviction and was released on $50,000 bail; from 1952 to 1961, he was in and out of half a dozen federal and local prisons and jails, his confinement interrupted by periods when he was out on bail pending determination of appeals.

=== The return of Genovese ===
Costello ruled for twenty peaceful years, but his quiet reign ended when Genovese was extradited from Italy to New York. During his absence, Costello demoted Genovese from underboss to caporegime, leaving Genovese determined to take control of the family. Soon after his arrival in the U.S., Genovese was acquitted of the 1936 murder charge that had driven him into exile. Free of legal entanglements, he started plotting against Costello with the assistance of Mangano family underboss Carlo Gambino.

On May 2, 1957, Luciano mobster Vincent "the Chin" Gigante shot Costello in the side of the head as Costello returned to his apartment. Gigante's aim proved errant, however, and Costello survived the attack with no more than a flesh wound. Costello claimed he could not identify his attacker; Gigante was later acquitted when prosecuted for the shooting.

Months later, Anastasia, the boss of the Mangano family and a powerful ally of Costello's, was murdered by Gambino's gunmen at the Park Central Hotel in Manhattan. With Anastasia's death, Carlo Gambino seized control of the Mangano family. Fearing for his life and isolated after the shootings, Costello quietly retired and surrendered control of the Luciano family to Genovese.

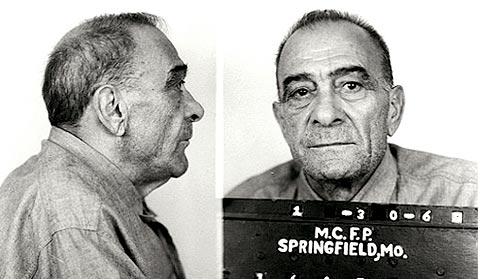
Vito Genovese's mugshot

Having taken control of what was renamed the Genovese crime family in 1957, Genovese decided to organize a Mafia conference to legitimize his new position. Held at mobster Joseph "Joe the Barber" Barbara's estate in Apalachin, New York, the Apalachin meeting attracted over 100 mobsters from around the nation. However, local law enforcement stumbled upon the meeting and quickly surrounded the estate. As the meeting broke up, the police stopped a car driven by Russell Bufalino, whose passengers included Genovese and three other men, at a roadblock as they left the estate. Mafia leaders were chagrined by the public exposure and bad publicity from the Apalachin meeting, and generally blamed Genovese for the fiasco. All those apprehended were fined, up to $10,000 each, and given prison sentences ranging from three to five years, but all the convictions were overturned on appeal in 1960.

Wary of Genovese gaining more power in the Commission, Gambino used the Apalachin meeting as an excuse to move against his former ally. Gambino, Luciano, Costello, and Lucchese allegedly lured Genovese into a drug-dealing scheme that ultimately resulted in his conspiracy indictment and conviction. In 1959, Genovese was sentenced to fifteen years in prison on narcotics charges. Genovese, who was the most powerful boss in New York, had been effectively eliminated as a rival by Gambino.

=== The Valachi Hearings ===
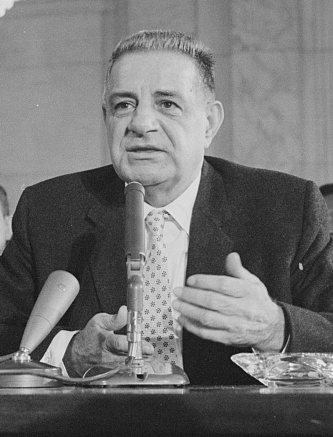
Joseph Valachi during the McClellan hearings, 1963

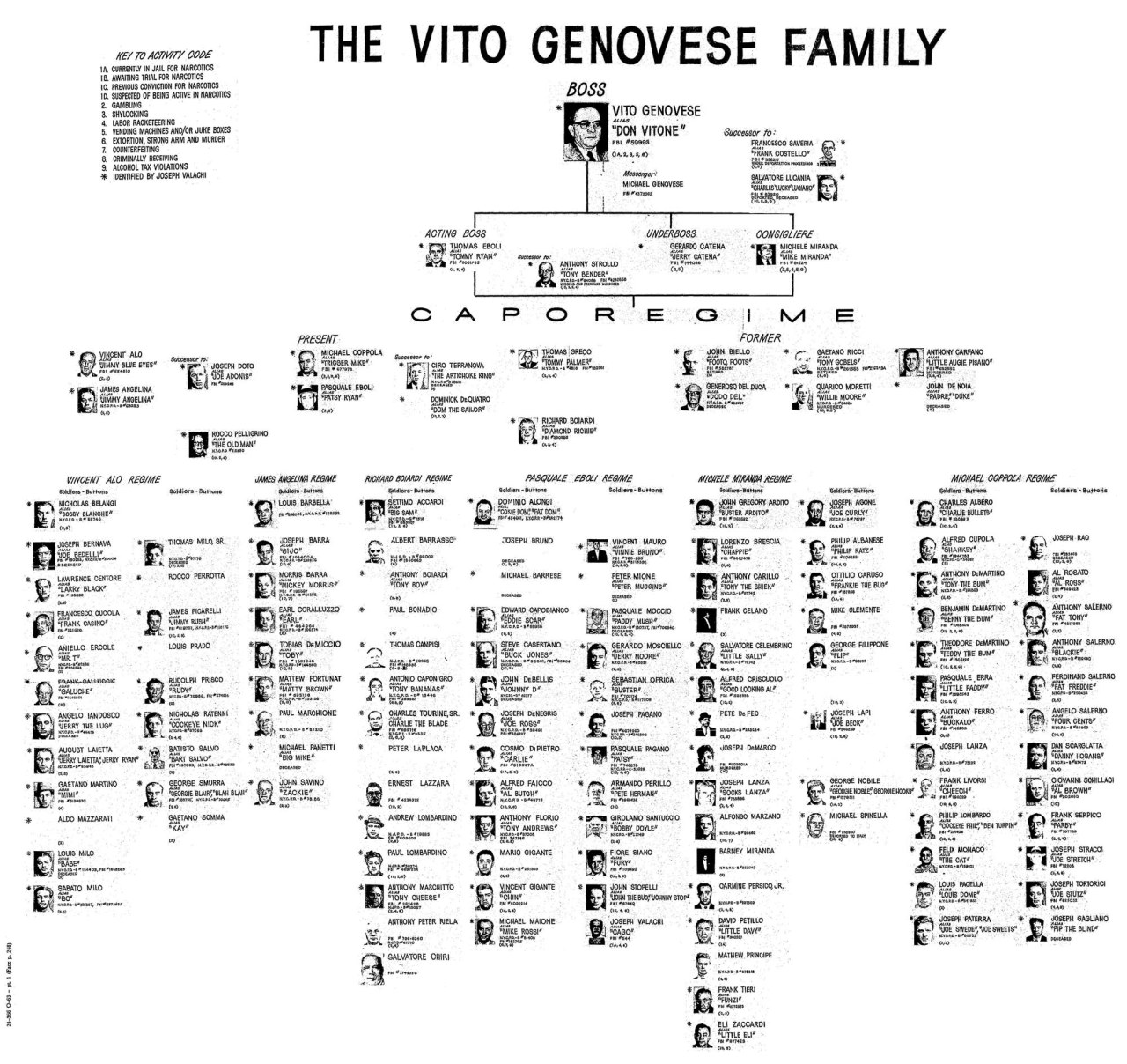
FBI chart of the Genovese family hierarchy in 1963

Genovese soldier Joe Valachi was convicted of narcotics violations in 1959, and sentenced to fifteen years in prison. Valachi's motivations for becoming a government informant had been the subject of some debate; Valachi claimed to be testifying as a public service and to expose a powerful criminal organization that he had blamed for ruining his life, but it is possible he was hoping for government protection as part of a plea bargain in which he was sentenced to life imprisonment instead of the death penalty for a 1962 murder.

While serving his sentence for heroin trafficking, Valachi came to fear that Genovese, also serving a sentence on the same charge, had ordered his murder. On June 22, 1962, using a pipe left near some construction work, Valachi bludgeoned an inmate to death whom he had mistaken for Joseph DiPalermo, a Mafia member he believed had been contracted to kill him. After time with FBI handlers, Valachi came forward with a story of Genovese giving him a kiss on the cheek, which he took as a "kiss of death". A $100,000 bounty for Valachi's death had been placed by Genovese.

Soon after, Valachi decided to cooperate with the U.S. Justice Department. In October 1963, he testified before Arkansas Senator John L. McClellan's Permanent Subcommittee on Investigations of the US Senate Committee on Government Operations, known as the Valachi hearings, stating that the Italian-American Mafia actually existed, the first time a member had acknowledged its existence in public. Valachi's testimony was the first major violation of omertà, breaking his blood oath. He is credited with popularization of the term cosa nostra.

Although Valachi's disclosures never led directly to the prosecution of any Mafia leaders, he provided many details of history of the Mafia, operations, and rituals, aided in the solving of several unsolved murders, and named many Mafia members, as well as the names of the major crime families themselves. The trial exposed American organized crime to the world through Valachi's televised testimony.

=== Front bosses and the ruling panels ===
After Genovese was sent to prison in 1959, the family leadership secretly established a "Ruling Panel" to run the family in his absence. This first panel included acting boss Thomas "Tommy Ryan" Eboli, underboss Gerardo "Jerry" Catena, and Catena's protégé Philip "Benny Squint" Lombardo. After Genovese died in 1969, Lombardo was named his successor.

However, the family appointed a series of "front bosses" to masquerade as the official family boss. The aim of these deceptions was to protect Lombardo by confusing law enforcement as to who the true leader of the family was.

In the late 1960s, Gambino lent $4 million to Eboli for a drug scheme in an attempt to gain control of the Genovese family. When Eboli failed to pay back his debt, Gambino, with Commission approval, had him murdered in 1972.

After Eboli's death, Genovese capo and Gambino ally Frank "Funzi" Tieri was appointed as the new front boss. In reality, the Genovese family created a new ruling panel to run the organization. This second panel consisted of Catena, Lombardo, and Michele "Big Mike" Miranda. In 1981, Tieri became the first Mafia boss to be convicted under the new RICO Act and died in prison later that year.

After Tieri's imprisonment, the family reshuffled its leadership. The capo of the Manhattan faction, Anthony "Fat Tony" Salerno, became the new front boss. Lombardo, the de facto boss of the family, soon retired and Gigante, the triggerman on the failed Costello hit, took actual control of the family.

In 1985, US Attorney General for the Southern District of New York, Rudolph Giuliani, set his sights on taking down the Mafia Commission through wiretaps, cooperating witnesses, and surveillance cameras. In 1985, Salerno was convicted in the Mafia Commission Trial and sentenced to 100 years in federal prison. In 1986, shortly after Salerno's conviction, his longtime right-hand man, Vincent "The Fish" Cafaro, turned informant, and told the FBI that Salerno had been the front boss for Gigante. Cafaro also revealed that the Genovese family had been keeping up this ruse since 1969.

After the 1980 murder of Philadelphia boss Angelo "Gentle Don" Bruno, Gigante and Lombardo began manipulating the rival factions in the war-torn Philadelphia family. They finally gave their support to Philadelphia mobster Nicodemo "Little Nicky" Scarfo, who in return gave the Genovese mobsters permission to operate in Atlantic City in 1982.

=== The Oddfather ===
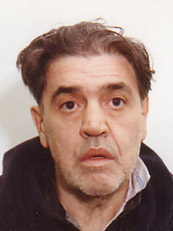
FBI mugshot of Vincent Gigante in his bathrobe

Gigante built a vast network of bookmaking and loansharking rings, and from extortion of garbage, shipping, trucking, and construction companies seeking labor peace or contracts from carpenters', Teamsters, and laborers' unions, including those at the Javits Center, as well as protection payoffs from merchants at the Fulton Fish Market. Gigante also had influence in the Feast of San Gennaro in Little Italy, running illegal gambling operations, extorting payoffs from vendors, and pocketing thousands of dollars donated to a neighborhood church—until a crackdown in 1995 by New York City officials. During Gigante's tenure as boss of the Genovese family, after the imprisonment of John Gotti in 1992, Gigante came to be known as the figurehead capo di tutti capi, the "Boss of All Bosses", despite the position being abolished since 1931 with the murder of Salvatore Maranzano.

Gigante was reclusive, and almost impossible to capture on wiretaps, speaking softly, eschewing the phone, and even at times whistling into the receiver. He almost never left his home unoccupied because he knew FBI agents would sneak in and plant a bug. Genovese members were not allowed to mention Gigante's name in conversations or phone calls; when they had to mention him, members would point to their chins or make the letter "C" with their fingers.

On May 30, 1990, Gigante was indicted along with other members of four of the Five Families for conspiring to rig bids and extort payoffs from contractors on multimillion-dollar contracts with the New York City Housing Authority to install windows. Gigante attended his arraignment in pajamas and a bathrobe, and due to his defense stating that he was mentally and physically impaired, legal battles ensued for seven years over his competence to stand trial. In June 1993, Gigante was indicted again, charged with sanctioning the murders of six mobsters and conspiring to kill three others, including Gotti.

At sanity hearings in March 1996, Sammy "The Bull" Gravano, former underboss of the Gambino family, who became a cooperating witness in 1991, and Alphonse "Little Al" D'Arco, former acting boss of the Lucchese family, testified that Gigante was lucid at top-level Mafia meetings and that he had told other gangsters that his eccentric behavior was a pretense. Gigante's lawyers presented testimony and reports from psychiatrists stating that, from 1969 to 1995, Gigante had been confined twenty-eight times in hospitals for treatment of hallucinations and that he suffered from "dementia rooted in organic brain damage".

In August 1996, Judge Eugene Nickerson of the United States District Court for the Eastern District of New York ruled that Gigante was mentally competent to stand trial; he pleaded not guilty and had been free for years on $1 million bail. Gigante had a cardiac operation in December 1996. On June 25, 1997, Gigante's trial started, which he attended in a wheelchair.

On July 25, after almost three days of deliberations, the jury convicted Gigante of conspiring in plots to kill other mobsters and of running rackets as head of the Genovese family, but acquitted him of seven counts of murder. Prosecutors stated that the verdict finally established that Gigante was not mentally ill as his lawyers and relatives had long maintained. On December 18, 1997, Gigante was sentenced to twelve years in prison and fined $1.25 million by Judge Jack B. Weinstein, a lenient sentence due to Gigante's "age and frailty", who declared that Gigante had been "finally brought to bay in his declining years after decades of vicious criminal tyranny".

While in prison, Gigante maintained his role as boss of the Genovese family, while other mobsters were entrusted to run its day-to-day activities. Longtime capo Matthew "Matty the Horse" Ianniello became acting boss of the family. Gigante relayed orders to the family through his son, Andrew, who visited him in prison.

On January 23, 2002, Gigante was indicted with several other mobsters, including Andrew, on obstruction of justice charges due to his causing a seven-year delay in his previous trial by feigning insanity. Several days later, Andrew was released on $2.5 million bail. On April 7, 2003, the day the trial began, Prosecutor Roslynn R. Mauskopf had planned to play tapes showing Gigante "fully coherent, careful, and intelligent", running criminal operations from prison, but when Gigante pled guilty to obstruction of justice, Judge I. Leo Glasser sentenced him to an additional three years in prison. Mauskopf stated, "The jig is up ... Vincent Gigante was a cunning faker, and those of us in law enforcement always knew that this was an act ... The act ran for decades, but today it's over." On July 25, 2003, Andrew Gigante was sentenced to two years in prison and fined $2.5 million for racketeering and extortion.

On July 27, 2005, Matthew Ianniello was indicted on charges of racketeering related to extortion and loansharking. On June 10, 2006, Ianniello was indicted once again for racketeering charges related to Genovese control of waste management businesses in Southwestern Connecticut.

Gigante died on December 19, 2005, at the Medical Center for Federal Prisoners in Springfield, Missouri. His funeral and burial were held four days later, on December 23, at Saint Anthony of Padua Church in Greenwich Village, largely in anonymity.

=== After Gigante's death ===
After Gigante's death, the leadership of the Genovese family went to capo Daniel "Danny the Lion" Leo, who was apparently running the day-to-day activities of the family by 2006. That same year, Cirillo was reportedly promoted to consigliere behind bars and Mangano was released from prison. By 2008, the family administration was believed to be whole again.

In March of that year, Leo was sentenced to five years in prison for loansharking and extortion. Former acting consigliere Lawrence "Little Larry" Dentico was leading the New Jersey faction of the family until convicted of racketeering in 2006; he was released from prison in 2009. In December 2008, Liborio Bellomo was paroled after serving twelve years; what role he plays in the Genovese hierarchy is open to speculation, but he likely has had a major say in the running of the family since his tight parole restrictions expired. The family continued to maintain influence in New York, New Jersey, Atlantic City and Florida and is recognized as the most powerful Mafia family in the U.S., a distinction brought about by their continued devotion to secrecy.

On August 4, 2016, the United States Attorney of New York charged 46 Mafia leaders with racketeering conspiracy, arson, illegal trafficking in firearms, and conspiracy to commit assault throughout the East Coast of the United States, from Springfield, Massachusetts to Southern Florida. The 46 defendants were leaders, members, and associates of the Genovese, Gambino, Luchese, Bonanno, and Philadelphia crime families. The charges stemmed from evidence obtained during an FBI Special Agent's time undercover infiltrating Genovese family capo Pasquale Parrello's Bronx crew, who were operating from Parrello's restaurant, Rigoletto. Cooperating witnesses who worked for Parrello began working with Joseph Merlino, the boss of the Philadelphia crime family, and Eugene "Rooster" O'Nofrio, a Genovese family acting capo with crews operating in Little Italy in New York as well as Springfield, Massachusetts. Other Genovese members charged were capo Conard Ianniello, who was using O'Nofrio as his acting capo to run his crews, soldier Ralph Balsamo, and associates Anthony Vazzano, Anthony Zinzi, Vincent Terracciano, Ronald Mastrovincenzo, Israel Torres and others.

In 2016, Onofrio was accused of operating a large multimillion-dollar enterprise that ran bookmaking offices, scammed medical businesses, and smuggled cigarettes and guns. He was also alleged to have run a loansharking operation from Florida to Massachusetts. Other members of his reputed crew pleaded guilty to extortion and other crimes. Gerald Daniele, an associate, was sentenced to two years in prison in March 2018. On April 10, 2018, Ralph Santaniello, suspected of being a Genovese acting capo, was sentenced to five years in prison for extorting $20,000 from Craig Morel, the owner of one of the biggest towing and scrap-metal companies in Massachusetts, including threatening his life and assaulting him. Morel managed to negotiate the extortion price from $100,000 to $20,000. Associate Giovanni "Johnny" Calabrese was sentenced to 3 years in prison.

In October 2017, thirteen Genovese and Gambino associates and soldiers were sentenced after being indicted following an NYPD operation in December 2016. Dubbed "Shark Bait", the investigation focused on a large-scale illegal gambling and loansharking ring. Prosecutors claimed 76-year-old Genovese soldier Salvatore DeMeo was in charge of the operation and had generated several million dollars from the enterprise. Soldier Alex Conigliaro was sentenced to four months in jail and four months house arrest in late October 2017, with a fine of $5,000, after admitting that he supervised and financed a $14,000-per-week illegal bookmaking and sports betting operation between 2011 and 2014. Genovese associates Gennaro Geritano and Mario Leonardi were allegedly partners in selling untaxed cigarettes in New York, selling over 30,000 packs.

=== Current position and leadership ===
According to the FBI, the Genovese family had not had an official boss since Gigante's death and the leadership was in a state of limbo for some time. Law enforcement considers Leo to be the acting boss, Mangano the underboss, and Cirillo the consigliere. The family is known for placing top capos in leadership positions to help the administration run day-to-day activities. At present, capos Bellomo, Muscarella, Cirillo, and Dentico hold the greatest influence within the family and play major roles in its administration. The Manhattan and Bronx factions, the traditional powers in the family, still exercise that control today. By 2016 however the FBI considers Liborio Bellomo to most likely be the official boss of the Genovese family.

On January 10, 2018, five members and associates, including Gigante's son Vincent Esposito, were arrested and charged with racketeering, conspiracy, and several counts of related offenses by the NYPD and FBI. The charges include extortion, labor racketeering conspiracy, fraud and bribery. Genovese associate and Brooklyn-based United Food and Commercial Workers officer Frank Cognetta was also charged. Union official and associate Vincent D'Acunto Jr. was also involved and allegedly acted on behalf of Esposito to pass along threat messages and to also collect extortion money from the union, in particular from Vincent Fyfe, the president of a wine liquor and distillery union in Brooklyn. Fyfe was forced to pay $10,000 per year to keep his $300,000-a-year union job, which he obtained through the influence of the Genovese family. The labor union infiltration was alleged to have taken place for at least sixteen years. Esposito allegedly extorted several other union officials and an insurance agent. At his home during a warranted search, authorities recovered an unregistered handgun, $3.8 million in cash, brass knuckledusters, and a handwritten list of American Mafia members.

Vincent Esposito was granted bail for almost $10 million in April 2018, and pled not guilty. In April 2019, Esposito pled guilty to conspiring to commit racketeering offenses with members and associates of the Genovese family. Vincent Esposito was sentenced to 24 months in prison and forfeiture of $3.8 million for racketeering conspiracy.

On August 13, 2020, an indictment charged soldier Christopher Chierchio along with Colombo family associate Frangesco "Frankie" Russo (the grandson of Colombo family boss Andrew Russo), attorney Jason "Jay" Kurland and securities broker Frank Smookler with conspiracy, wire fraud and money laundering. The indictment accused the "lottery attorney" Kurland along with Russo, Chierchio and Smookler with swindling $80 million from jackpot winners in an illegal scheme of siphoning money from the jackpot winners' investments.

On April 26, 2022, an indictment was served charging capos Nicholas Calisi and Ralph Balsamo, soldiers Michael Messina and John Campanella, and associates Michael Poli and Thomas Poli, with racketeering conspiracy involving illegal gambling and extortion. Balsamo was previously arrested on April 12, and Calisi was detained in Boca Raton, Florida, and presented before a U.S. magistrate judge in the Southern District of Florida. According to the indictment, the defendants operated a criminal racketeering enterprise since at least 2011. On February 9, 2023, it was announced that all six defendants in the case had pleaded guilty to the racketeering charges.

On May 3, 2022, exactly a week after the Calisi and Balsamo indictments, another indictment was served that charged capo Anthony "Rom" Romanello, soldier Joseph Celso, and small-time actor and family associate Luan Bexheti with extortion and obstruction of justice. Romanello, who authorities state controls the family's Queens crew, oversaw the extortion and intimidation of a Brooklyn restaurant owner, which was carried out by Celso and Bexheti

On August 16, 2022, acting capo Carmelo "Carmine" Polito along with family soldier Joseph Macario, Genovese family associates Salvatore Rubino and Joseph Rutigliano, Bonnano family capo Anthony Pipitone, Bonanno soldier Vito Pipitone, Bonanno associate Agostino Gabriele and Nassau County Police Detective Hector Rosario were indicted and charged with racketeering, money laundering, illegal gambling, conspiracy and obstruction of justice. The Genovese family and the Bonanno family jointly operated several illegal gambling operations while using front businesses in Queens and Long Island to launder illegal profits. The indictment revealed that beginning in May 2012, the Genovese and Bonanno families jointly operated a lucrative illegal gambling operation in Lynbrook, New York called the Gran Caffe. The Genovese family members Carmelo Polito, Joseph Macario and associates Salvatore Rutigliano and Joseph Rubino were charged with operating illegal gambling parlors at establishments called Sal's Shoe Repair, the Centro Calcio Italiano Club and running an illegal online gambling scheme.

On November 30, 2022, Genovese family soldiers Elio Albanese and Carmine Russo were charged for their involvement in a scheme that involved obtaining oxycodone pills from a Midtown Manhattan doctor and having their associates sell the oxycodone on Staten Island.

On January 18, 2023, Genovese family soldier Christopher "Jerry" Chierchio was indicted along with Gambino family capo Frank "Calypso" Camuso, Gambino soldier Louis Astuto, Gambino associate Robert "Rusty" Baselice and 19 other defendants including 26 companies for a kickback scheme allegedly operated by Baselice, the vice president of the Grimaldi Group, a firm which allegedly received $4.2 million from contractors. In 2019, Chierchio along with Baselice stole over $300,000 from developer, the indictment states that Baselice allegedly used his position from April 2013 to July 2021, to steal from his firm's developer clients by providing inside information about competitors' bids to subcontractors, among other offenses.

On June 6, 2023, five men with connections to the Genovese and Lucchese crime families were indicted for carrying out two brazen midday Manhattan jewelry heists. The robberies, committed on January 3, 2023, and May 20, 2023, respectively, netted the quintet around $2M. Arrested was Frank DiPietro, a Genovese associate, as well as Vincent Cerchio, Michael Sellick, Samuel Sore, and Vincent Spagnuolo.

== Historical leadership ==
=== Boss (official and acting) ===
- c. 1890s–1909 — Giuseppe "the Clutch Hand" Morello — imprisoned
- 1909–1916 — Nicholas "Nick Morello" Terranova — murdered on September 7, 1916
- 1916–1920 — Vincenzo "Vincent" Terranova — stepped down becoming underboss
- 1920–1922 — Giuseppe "the Clutch Hand" Morello — stepped down becoming underboss to Masseria
- 1922–1931 — Giuseppe "Joe the Boss" Masseria — murdered on April 15, 1931
- 1931–1946 — Charles "Lucky" Luciano — imprisoned in 1936, deported to Italy in 1946
  - Acting 1936–1937 — Vito Genovese — fled to Italy in 1937 to avoid murder charge
  - Acting 1937–1946 — Frank "The Prime Minister" Costello — became official boss after Luciano's deportation
- 1946–1957 — Frank "The Prime Minister" Costello — resigned in 1957 after Genovese-Gigante assassination attempt
- 1957–1969 — Vito "Don Vito" Genovese — imprisoned in 1959, died in prison in 1969
  - Acting 1959–1962 — Anthony "Tony Bender" Strollo — disappeared in 1962
  - Acting 1962–1965 — Thomas "Tommy Ryan" Eboli — became front boss
  - Acting 1965–1969 — Philip "Benny Squint" Lombardo — became the official boss
- 1969–1981 — Philip "Benny Squint" Lombardo — retired in 1981, died of natural causes in 1987
- 1981–2005 — Vincent "Chin" Gigante — imprisoned in 1997, died in prison on December 19, 2005
  - Acting 1989–1996 — Liborio "Barney" Bellomo — imprisoned
  - Acting 1997–1998 — Dominick "Quiet Dom" Cirillo — suffered a heart attack and stepped down
  - Acting 1998–2005 — Matthew "Matty the Horse" Ianniello — resigned when indicted in July 2005
  - Acting 2005 — Daniel "Danny the Lion" Leo — imprisoned 2008–2013
- 2006–present — Liborio "Barney" Bellomo — released from prison on December 1, 2008.
  - Acting 2006–2008 — Daniel "Danny the Lion" Leo — imprisoned 2008–2013
  - Acting 2025–present — Daniel Pagano

=== Street boss (front boss) ===
The position of "front boss" was created by boss Philip Lombardo in efforts to divert law enforcement attention from himself. The family maintained this "front boss" deception for the next 20 years. Even after government witness Vincent Cafaro exposed this ruse in 1988, the Genovese family still found this way of dividing authority useful. In 1992, the family revived the front boss post under the title of "street boss". This person served as day-to-day head of the family's operations under Vincent Gigante's remote direction.

- 1965–1972 — Thomas "Tommy Ryan" Eboli — murdered in 1972
- 1972–1974 — Carmine "Little Eli" Zeccardi — disappeared (presumed killed) in 1977
- 1975–1980 — Frank "Funzi" Tieri — indicted under RICO statutes and resigned, died in 1981
- 1981–1987 — Anthony "Fat Tony" Salerno — imprisoned in 1987, died in prison in 1992
- 1992–1996 — Liborio "Barney" Bellomo — imprisoned from 1996 to 2008
- 1998–2001 — Frank Serpico – in 2001 was indicted, in 2002 died of cancer
- 2001–2002 — Ernest Muscarella — indicted in 2002
- 2002–2006 — Arthur "Artie" Nigro — indicted in 2006
- 2008–2013 — Dominick "Quiet Dom" Cirillo — also served as the consigliere, stepped down
- 2013–2014 — Daniel "Danny" Pagano — indicted August 2014
- 2014–2015 — Peter "Petey Red" DiChiara — stepped down, became consigliere
- 2015–2021 — Michael "Mickey" Ragusa — stepped down
- 2021–2025 — Daniel Pagano — became acting boss
- 2025–present — Michael "Hippie" Zanfardino

=== Underboss (official and acting) ===
- 1903–1909 — Ignazio "The Wolf" Lupo — imprisoned
- 1910–1916 — Vincenzo "Vincent" Terranova — became boss
- 1916–1920 — Ciro "The Artichoke King" Terranova — stepped down
- 1920–1922 — Vincenzo "Vincent" Terranova — murdered on May 8, 1922
- 1922–1930 — Giuseppe "Peter the Clutch Hand" Morello — murdered on August 15, 1930
- 1930–1931 — Joseph Catania — murdered on February 3, 1931
- 1931 — Charles "Lucky" Luciano — became boss April 1931
- 1931–1936 — Vito Genovese — promoted to acting boss in 1936, fled to Italy in 1937
  - Acting 1936–1937 – Anthony "Tony Bender" Strollo – demoted
- 1937–1951 — Guarino "Willie" Moretti — murdered in 1951
- 1951–1957 — Vito Genovese — second time as underboss
- 1957–1970 — Gerardo "Jerry" Catena — also boss of the New Jersey faction; jailed from 1970 to 1975
- 1970–1972 — Thomas "Tommy Ryan" Eboli — also served as front boss, murdered in 1972
- 1972–1975 — Frank "Funzi" Tieri — also served as front boss
- 1975–1981 — Anthony "Fat Tony" Salerno — promoted to front boss in 1980
- 1981–1987 — Saverio "Sammy" Santora — died of natural causes
- 1987–2017 — Venero "Benny Eggs" Mangano — imprisoned in 1993, released December 2006, died August 18, 2017, of natural causes.
  - Acting 1990–1997 — Michael "Mickey Dimino" Generoso — imprisoned
  - Acting 1997–2003 — Joseph Zito
  - Acting 2003–2005 — John "Johnny Sausage" Barbato — imprisoned from 2005 to 2008
- 2017–2025 — Ernest "Ernie" Muscarella retired
  - Acting 2021–2025 — Michael "Mickey" Ragusa
- 2025–present — Ralph "The Undertaker" Balsamo

=== Consigliere (official and acting) ===
- 1931–1937 — Frank Costello — promoted to acting boss in 1937
- 1937–1957 — Alessandro "Sandino" Pandolfo — mysterious figure mentioned once by Valachi
- 1957–1972 — Michele "Mike" Miranda — retired in 1972
- 1972–1975 — Anthony "Fat Tony" Salerno — promoted to underboss in 1975
- 1975–1978 — Antonio "Buckaloo" Ferro
- 1978–1980 — Dominick "Fat Dom" Alongi
- 1980–1981 — Vincent "Chin" Gigante — promoted to boss
- 1981–1990 — Louis "Bobby" Manna — imprisoned in 1990
  - Acting 1989–1990 — James "Little Guy" Ida — became official consigliere
- 1990–1997 — James "Little Guy" Ida — imprisoned in 1997
- 1997–2009 — Lawrence "Little Larry" Dentico — imprisoned from 2005 to 2009; retired
  - Acting 2005–2009 — Dominick "Quiet Dom" Cirillo – became official consigliere
- 2009–2015 – Dominick "Quiet Dom" Cirillo — reportedly stepped down
- 2015–2018 – Peter "Petey Red" DiChiara – died on March 2, 2018
- 2018–2022 – Anthony "Tough Tony" Federici – died on November 9, 2022
- 2022–present – Pasquale "Patsy" Parrello

=== Messaggero ===
The Genovese family is the only family with messaggero position. The position does not take over any responsibilities from the Underboss or the Consigliere. The role of the messaggero (messenger) functions as the boss's personal messenger, by passing on the boss's orders to other members. The messenger can reduce the need for "sit-downs", or meetings, with the boss, and thus limit the public exposure of the boss. In Italian the messenger is called a "mushata", which means to whisper in one's ear.

- 1957–1969 — Michael "Mike" Genovese — the brother of Vito Genovese.
- 1970–1981 — Antonio "Tony Goebbels" Ricci — died in Florida in 1981
- 1990–1997 — Dominick "Quiet Dom" Cirillo — became acting boss
- 1997–2002 — Andrew V. Gigante — the son of Vincent Gigante, indicted 2002
- 2002–2005 — Mario Gigante

=== Administrative capos ===
If the official boss dies, goes to prison, or is incapacitated, the family may assemble a ruling committee of capos to help the acting boss, street boss, underboss, and consigliere run the family, and to divert attention from law enforcement.

- 1996–1997 — (five-man committee) — Dominick "Quiet Dom" Cirillo, Lawrence "Larry Fab" Dentico, Alan "Baldie" Longo, Mario Gigante and John "Johnny Sausage" Barbato — in 1997, Cirillo became acting boss
- 1997–1998 — (five-man committee) — Lawrence Dentico, Frank "Punchy" Illiano, Alan Longo, Mario Gigante and John Barbato
- 1998–2001 — (five-man committee) — Dominick Cirillo, consigliere Lawrence Dentico, Alan Longo, Mario Gigante, and John Barbato — in 2001, Longo was imprisoned.
- 2001–2002 — (four-man committee) — Lawrence Dentico, Mario Gigante, John Barbato, and Ernie Muscarella — in 2001, Muscarella became street boss and in 2002, Muscarella was indicted.
- 2002–2003 — (four-man committee) — Lawrence Dentico, Mario Gigante, John Barbato, and Arthur "Artie" Nigro — in 2002, Nigro became street boss.
- 2002–2005 — (four-man committee) — Lawrence Dentico, Mario Gigante, John Barbato, and Daniel "Danny the Lion" Leo — in April and August 2005, Dentico was indicted. In July 2004 and April 2005, Barbato was indicted.
- 2005–2007 — (three-man committee) — Dominick "Quiet Dom" Cirillo, Ernie Muscarella, and Daniel Leo — in 2005, Leo became acting boss
- 2007–2010 — (three-man committee) — Tino "The Greek" Fiumara (died 2010) Dominick "Quiet Dom" Cirillo, and Ernie Muscarella

== Current members ==
=== Administration ===
- Boss — Liborio "Barney" Bellomo (born January 8, 1957) — current boss of the family. Bellomo served in the 116th Street Crew of Saverio "Sammy Black" Santora and was initiated in 1977. His father was a soldier and close to Anthony "Fat Tony" Salerno. In 1990, Kenneth McCabe, then-organized crime investigator for the United States attorney's office in Manhattan, identified Bellomo as "acting boss" of the crime family following the indictment of Vincent Gigante in the "Windows case". In June 1996, Bellomo was indicted on charges of extortion, labor racketeering and for ordering the deaths of Ralph DeSimone in 1991 and Anthony "Hickey" DiLorenzo in 1988; DeSimone was found shot five times in the trunk of his car at LaGuardia Airport and DiLorenzo was shot and killed in the backyard of his home. Since around 2016, Bellomo was recognized, most likely, to be the official boss of the Genovese family. As of 2024, Bellomo's inner circle includes Underboss Ernie Muscarella, Street boss Danny Pagano, Consigliere Pasquale Parello, captain Pasquale Falcetti, acting underboss Micheal Ragusa, captain Ralph Balsamo and captain Anthony Palumbo.
- Acting boss — Daniel "Danny" Pagano — current acting boss of the family. He served as Street boss of the family before. Pagano was a capo operating from the Bronx, Westchester, Rockland and New Jersey. During the 1980s, Pagano was involved in the bootleg gasoline scheme with Russian mobsters. On July 10, 2015, Pagano was sentenced to 27 months in prison on racketeering conspiracy charges.
- Street boss — Michael "Hippy" Zanfardino — current street boss of family for Danny Pagano. Former acting capo of the "116th Street Crew". Zanfardino has been a soldier in the Bronx faction, and reportedly very close to family boss Liborio Bellomo. In January 2004, Zanfardino pleaded guilty to counts of racketeering and extortion involving the shakedown of two nightclubs in the Bronx area and a waste disposal business in New Jersey. Additionally, he pleaded guilty to the attempted murder of two gangland figures. In 1990, he shot gangster Armond Dragone, who survived the attempt. In 1995, he shot Tanglewood Boys crew member Darin Mazzarella 14 times, but Mazzarella also survived his murder attempt. Zanfardino was released from prison on May 6, 2016.
- Underboss — Ralph "The Undertaker" Balsamo — current underboss of the family. Balsamo is a former capo with operations in the Bronx, Manhattan and Westchester. His nickname "The Undertaker" comes from him owning funeral homes in the Bronx. In 2007, Balsamo pled guilty to narcotics trafficking, firearms trafficking, extortion, and union-related fraud and was sentenced to 97 months in prison. Balsamo was held in detention until trial. Balsamo was arrested on April 12, 2022, on racketeering charges. According to an indictment unsealed on April 26, 2022, Balsamo and five other codefendants, including capo Nicholas Calisi, operated a criminal racketeering enterprise since at least 2011. Balsamo pled guilty to racketeering on February 9, 2023. Balsamo is a member of Bellomo's inner circle and is possible successor to an administration position.
- Consigliere — Pasquale "Patsy" Parrello — current consigliere of the family. Parrello was born in 1945. He was a longtime capo operating in the Bronx. Parrello owns a restaurant on Arthur Avenue called Pasquale's Rigoletto Restaurant. In 2004, Parrello was found guilty of loansharking and embezzlement along with capo Rosario Gangi, and was sentenced to 88 months. In August 2016, Parrello was indicted along with Genovese family capo Conrad Ianniello and Genovese family acting capo Eugene O'Norfio and Philadelphia family boss Joseph Merlino and forty two other mobsters on gambling and extortion charges. In May 2017, he pled guilty to three counts of conspiracy to commit extortion and was sentenced to seven years in federal prison in September 2017. Prosecutors at his trial alleged that in June 2011 he ordered two of his soldiers to break the kneecaps of a man who annoyed female patrons at his restaurant.

=== Caporegimes ===
Bronx faction

- Nicholas "Nicky Slash" Calisi — capo of a Bronx crew, while operating in Florida. On April 26, 2022, Calisi and five other codefendants, including capo Ralph Balsamo, soldiers Michael Messina and John Campanella, and associates Michael Poli and Thomas Poli were indicted for operating a criminal racketeering enterprise of illegal gambling and extortion since at least 2011. Calisi was detained in Boca Raton, Florida. Calisi pled guilty to racketeering on February 8, 2023. On June 27, 2023, Calisi was sentenced to serve 24 months in prison. On December 2, 2024, the 66 year old Calisi was released from prison.
- Pasquale "Uncle Patty" Falcetti — capo of the "116th Street Crew" with operations in the Bronx and Manhattan. In September 2014, Falcetti was sentenced to 30 months in prison for loansharking. During Falcetti's trial former Genovese family associate Anthony Zoccolillo testified against Falcetti and claimed that Falcetti gave him a $34,000 loan for a marijuana trafficking operation. Falcetti is a member of Bellomo's inner circle and is possible successor to the consigliere position. On January 13, 2017, Falcetti was released from prison.
- Salvatore "Sally KO" Larca Jr. — capo of a crew operating from the Bronx, East Harlem and Manhattan. During the early 2000's, Larca was a member of Ernest Muscarella's East Harlem-Bronx crew. In 2006, Larca was indicted along with Genovese family acting boss Liborio Bellomo, Capo John Ardito, soldier Ralph Balsamo and 26 other members of the Genovese family on racketeering charges.

Manhattan faction

- John "Johnny Hollywood" Brescio — capo operating in Manhattan. Brescio owns "Lombardi's", a Manhattan-based pizzeria, which he runs with his step-son, Michael Giammarino. Brescio and Giammarino were denied a request to open a Lombardi's location inside of Parx Casino in Bensalem Township in Pennsylvania. In 2017, Brescio was identified a capo in the Genovese family during the investigation of Angelo Ruggiero's ALJ waterfront application.
- Thomas "Figgy" Ficarotta — capo operating from Manhattan and Brooklyn. In 1983, Ficarotta was indicted for operating a national burglary ring, the indictment stated that Ficarotta was a made member of the Genovese family and paid tribute to Genovese member Thomas Greco. In 1985, Ficarotta served five years in prison for extortion. In 1986, Ficarotta was convicted of RICO offense involving Local 814. In 1995, his son Tom Ficarotta was identified along with other in the Javits Center carpenters racketeering investigation of Anthony Fiorino.
- Conrad Ianniello — capo operating in Manhattan, Brooklyn, Queens, Staten Island, Connecticut, Long Island, New Jersey, Springfield and Florida. On April 18, 2012, Ianniello was indicted along with members of his crew and was charged with illegal gambling and conspiracy. The conspiracy charge dates back to 2008, when Ianniello along with Robert Scalza and Ryan Ellis tried to extort vendors at the annual Feast of San Gennaro in Little Italy. Conrad Ianniello is related to Robert Ianniello Jr., who is the nephew to Matthew Ianniello and the owner of Umberto's Clam House. In August 2016 Ianniello was indicted along with Genovese family capo Pasquale Parrello and Genovese family acting capo Eugene O'Norfio and Philadelphia family boss Joseph Merlino and forty two other mobsters on gambling and extortion charges. On October 2, 2017, Iannieloo was released from prison.

Brooklyn faction

- Rocco "Rocky" DiPietro — capo operating from Brooklyn. His brother Frank DiPietro is Genovese family soldier. DiPietro's father was Genovese family capo Carlo "Collie" DiPietro who was murdered in 1981, by Genovese soldier Joseph Galizia. In August 1983, DiPietro during an argument shot and killed Billy Jenks at the Red Barn Tavern in Brooklyn.
- Barry Joseph "Nickels" Nichilo; also known as "Bartolomeo Nichola" — capo operating from Brooklyn. Nichilo began his criminal career as an associate to Genovese family capo Salvatore "Sally Dogs" Lombardi. In July 1992, Nichilo was indicted along with DeCavalcante crime family soldier Virgil Alessi, boss John Riggi and underboss John D'Amato for plotting to murder the DeCavalcante family's acting boss Gaetano "Corky" Vastola.

Queens faction

- Anthony "Rom" Romanello — Romanello became capo of the Queens-based "Federici crew", which operates from Corona Avenue in Corona, Queens, replacing Anthony "Tough Tony" Federici during the 2010s as Federici was suffering from health ailments. Federici died in November 2022. In December 2023, Romanello was convicted of assaulting a restaurant owner, over a debt of $90,000, and was sentenced to 2 years in prison, he was released from prison in April 2025 after serving 11 months in prison.

Staten Island faction

- Alex Conigliaro (born July 1960) — capo based in Staten Island, with operations in the Bronx and New Jersey. He works closely with Genovese capos Anthony Palumbo and James Tenaglia. Conigliaro was mentored by Genovese members Federico Giovanelli, Ninny Bruschi and Lawrence Dentico. He was one of 28 people arrested in March 1998 and charged with involvement in a reputed $50 million-per-year gambling ring which operated in Brooklyn, Queens and Staten Island. Conigliaro was allegedly the chief bookmaker of the operation, which was controlled by Giovanelli. In 2004, Conigliaro was acquitted of federal extortion and gambling charges. In August 2005, Conigliaro and fifteen other Genovese members and associates were arrested on federal racketeering charges related to a gambling and loansharking operation led by Dentico's New Jersey crew. In August 2016, Conigliaro was one of 46 defendants linked to the Genovese, Gambino, Lucchese, Bonanno and Philadelphia families indicted for multiple racketeering offenses. Conigliaro himself was arrested for extortion and illegal gambling. He pleaded guilty in June 2017 to a reduced charge of running an illegal gambling business. In October 2017, Conigliaro was sentenced to four months in jail.
- James "Jimmy T" Tenaglia — capo overseeing operations in Staten Island, Brooklyn and New Jersey. Tenaglia was initially affiliated with the Brooklyn faction of the Bonanno family, the Motion Lounge crew, which was formerly headed by Dominick "Sonny Black" Napolitano, and was transferred to the Genovese family, where he was placed into the crew of Anthony "Tony D" Palumbo, around this time Tenaglia specialised in the numbers racket, illegal gambling and loansharking. Tenaglia served time in prison in 1978 for racketeering, loan sharking, and fencing stolen goods, he was released in 1981. His captain and sponsor, Anthony Palumbo and Genovese heavyweight Danny Pagano were having disagreements over a defense strategy in court involving a racketeering case naming both Pagano and Palumbo at the time, resulting in the denial of Tenaglia's induction and other members of Palumbo's crew. With the help of then consigliere Dominick Cirillo, issues were resolved, and Tenaglia was inducted soon after. Now reported to be close with Pagano, the current acting boss and acts as his top lieutenant or right-hand man.

Westchester County faction

- Salvatore Gigante — capo of the "Westchester-Gigante crew", and the son of former capo Mario "The Shadow" Gigante. In June 1996, Gigante was indicted along with his father Mario and five others on charges of using violence to keep control of the garbage collection businesses in Westchester, Orange, Rockland, Ulster and Dutchess Counties in New York, southwestern Connecticut and Mahwah and Edison in New Jersey. On July 2, 1999, Gigante was released from prison.

New Jersey faction

- Stephen Depiro — capo of the "Fiumara crew" controlling illegal operations from the New Jersey Newark/Elizabeth Seaport. In 2005, Depiro began leading the crew with Tino Fiumara controlling illegal operations in the New Jersey piers and docks. During 2010, Depiro was overseeing the illegal operations in the New Jersey Newark/Elizabeth Seaport before Fiumara's death. In 2017, Depiro was identified a soldier in the Genovese family during the investigation of Mark Caruso, Jr.'s ALJ waterfront application.
- Silvio P. DeVita — capo controlling the Newark area for the Genovese family. DeVita is Sicilian born mobster operating in Essex County. In 1951, DeVita was convicted of first-degree murder during and robbery, he received a death sentence, until his conviction was reversed on appeal. At DeVita's new trail in 1958, he was found guilty and sentenced to life in prison but released on parole during the 1970s. Members of DeVita's crew include soldiers Salvatore Cetrulo and Joseph Cetrulo who have many family relatives working in the New Jersey docks.
- Anthony "Tony D." Palumbo — capo in the New Jersey faction. Palumbo previously served as acting boss of the New Jersey faction, a position given to him by close ally and then acting boss Daniel Leo. In 2009, Palumbo was arrested and charged with racketeering and murder along Daniel Leo and others. In August 2010, Palumbo pled guilty to conspiracy murder charges. He was sentenced to 10 years in prison and was released on November 22, 2019. Palumbo is a member of Bellomo's inner circle and is a powerful capo with operation in New Jersey and Staten Island with significant influence on the waterfront.

Connecticut–Massachusetts faction

- Eugene "Rooster" Onofrio — capo operating from East Haven, Connecticut. In the late 2010s, O'Nofrio served as acting capo of the "Mulberry Street crew" in Manhattan's Little Italy and acting capo of the "Springfield crew" in Springfield, Massachusetts. In 2016, Onofrio was indicted along with Genovese family capos Pasquale Parrello and Conrad Ianniello, Philadelphia family boss Joseph Merlino, Springfield gangsters Ralph Santaniello and Francesco Depergola, and 40 other mobsters on gambling and extortion charges. In 2025, Onofrio was promoted to captain again, controlling operations in Connecticut and overseeing the Springfield faction. Onofrio continues using Ralph and Amedeo Santaniello run the daily operations in Springfield.

=== Soldiers ===
New York

- Elio "Chinatown" Albanese — soldier. In November 2022, he was charged along with soldier Carmine Russo for their involvement in a scheme that involved obtaining oxycodone pills from a Midtown Manhattan doctor and having their associates sell the oxycodone on Staten Island.
- Vito Alberti (born November 1958) — soldier. On October 21, 2014, he was indicted along with captain Charles "Chucky" Tuzzo in New Jersey on charges of loansharking, gambling and money laundering charges. In September 2019, Alberti was sentenced to five years in prison after he was indicted in April 2016 on charges of operating a $4.7 million loanshark operation and operating an illegal sports betting ring reputedly earning more than $400,000 in profits, and money laundering.
- Steven "DD" Alfisi (born September 1964) — soldier. In February 2010, Alfisi was indicted for racketeering, illegal gambling, racketeering conspiracy, and extortion.
- Anthony "Tico" Antico – former capo who was involved in labor and construction racketeering in Brooklyn and Manhattan. In 2005, Antico along with capos John Barbato and Lawrence Dentico were convicted of extortion charges. In 2007, he was released from prison. On March 6, 2010, Antico was charged with racketeering in connection with the 2008, robbery and murder of Staten Island jeweler Louis Antonelli.
- Steven "Mad Dog" Arena (born October 1957) — soldier. In January 2018, Arena was indicted for extortion and racketeering conspiracy. In May 2019, Arena was sentenced to a year in prison, with three years of supervised release, for extortion within the United Food and Commercial Worker Locals in a scheme which lasted from between 2001 and 2017.
- Salvatore "Hot Dogs" Battaglia (born October 1946) — soldier. Battaglia served as the President of Local 1181 of the Amalgamated Transit Workers Union from between 2002 and 2006, a local which the Genovese family had a stronghold on since the early 1970s. In June 2008, Battaglia was sentenced to over four and a half years in prison after he had pled guilty to racketeering and extortion in January 2008.
- Liborio T. "Benny" Bellomo — reputed "made" member and first cousin of family boss, Liborio "Barney" Bellomo.
- James "Jamie" Bernardone (born May 1967) — soldier. Bernardone served as the Secretary Treasurer of the Local 124 of the International Union of Journeymen and Allied Trades. In April 2012, Bernardone was indicted for racketeering conspiracy and extortion. It is believed Bernardone had participated in several extortion schemes targeted at construction sites in Manhattan, Queens and Brooklyn since at least the early 2000s.
- John Campanella — soldier. On April 26, 2022, Campanella and five other codefendants, including capos Ralph Balsamo and Nicholas Calisi, soldier Michael Messina, and associates Michael Poli and Thomas Poli were indicted for operating a criminal racketeering enterprise of illegal gambling and extortion since at least 2011. Campanella pled guilty to racketeering on February 8, 2023.
- Robert "Bucky" Carbone — soldier. In April 2006, Carbone pled guilty to extortion of union members and officers of the Local 530 of the Operative Plasters and Cement Masons Union and another labor union from the drywall industry.
- Joseph Celso — soldier. On May 3, 2022, Celso was indicted with capo Anthony Romanello and associate Luan Bexheti and charged with extorting the owner of a Brooklyn Italian restaurant, and was formerly acquitted of murdering a 19-year-old man in 1993.
- Christopher "Jerry" Chierchio — On January 18, 2023, Chierchio was indicted along with Gambino family members capo Frank "Calypso" Camuso, soldier Louis Astuto and associate Robert "Rusty" Baselice along with 19 other defendants for a kickback scheme allegedly operated by Baselice. The indictment claimed that in 2019, Chierchio who used his position as an executive of RCI PLBG Inc, a plumbing and sprinkler subcontractor based in Staten Island to work along with Baselice to steal over $300,000 from other developers.
- Victor "Vic" Colletti — (born June 1935) soldier. In April 2005, Colletti was indicted for illegal gambling, along with 16 other defendants associated with the Genovese and Bonanno families. According to law enforcement, Colletti and Bonanno family soldier Anthony Frascone had led the operation, reputedly earning up to $200,000 per week. Colletti was sentenced to three years in prison.
- Michael "Mikey Cigars" Coppola (born May 1946) — soldier. Having been a fugitive since 1996, Coppola was arrested by the FBI in March 2007 for the April 1977 murder of Giovanni Larducci, who was allegedly shot five times by Coppola. In December 2009, Coppola was sentenced by former U.S. District Judge John Gleeson to 16 years in prison for extortion within the ILA Local 1235 in New Jersey since the 1970s.
- Matthew "Matt" Daddino (born April 1982) — soldier. In October 2025, Daddino was indicted as part of "Operation Royal Flush" which oversaw the arrest of 34 defendants accused of being affiliates with the Genovese, Gambino, Bonanno and Lucchese families. Daddino was alleged to have controlled illegal gambling operations in Manhattan.
- Carmine "Little Carm" Dellacava — soldier. In the late 2000s, Dellacava was involved in a lawsuit involving his company, Cava Construction, in which workers fought for fair wages.
- Pasquale "Scop" DeLuca (born 1931) — soldier. In early 1960, DeLuca was indicted on narcotics charges, including the sale of heroin in July 1957, receiving, concealing, and facilitating of heroin, and he was handed a five-year prison sentence. In May 2007, DeLuca pled guilty to conspiring to murder Ralph Coppola in September 1998, and in September 2007, DeLuca was sentenced to five years in prison.
- Salvatore "Sallie D" DeMeo (born January 1940) — soldier. DeMeo served a five-year prison sentence and was released in 2006, after he was found guilty of bank robbery in 1996, netting approximately $400,000. In December 2016, DeMeo was arrested on charges of operating a loanshark and illegal gambling operation. In October 2017, DeMeo was indicted for tax evasion after he had failed to report over $2 million in taxes.
- Joseph "Joe D" Denti Jr. (sometimes spelled Dente) — former capo operating in the Bronx and New Jersey. On December 5, 2001, Denti Jr. along with capo Rosario Gangi, capo Pasquale Parrello and 70 other associates were indicted in Manhattan on racketeering charges. The charges were brought against Denti Jr. and the others after it had been revealed that an undercover NYPD detective had infiltrated Parrello's Arthur Avenue crew. On March 16, 2016, Denti Jr. along with Joseph Giardina, Ralph Perricelli Jr., and Heidi Francavilla were indicted and charged with defrauding investors in medical ventures out of $350,000.
- Louis DiNapoli — soldier with his brother Vincent DiNapoli's "116th Street Crew".
- Vincent "Vinny" Esposito (born July 1967) — soldier. In July 2019, Esposito was sentenced by U.S. District Judge Victor Marrero to two years in prison for racketeering, including fraud, bribery and extortion, with three years of supervised release, $3.8 million in forfeiture and a $20,000 fine.
- Anthony Fazio Sr. (born September 1945) — soldier. Fazio Sr. had once served as the President of Local 348 of the United Food and Commercial Workers International Union from between 1976 and January 2010. In September 2012, Fazio Sr. was sentenced to over twelve years in prison with three years of supervised release and a fine of $1.5 million, after he was convicted of money laundering and witness tampering.
- Albert "Kid Blast" Gallo — former capo operating in the Brooklyn neighborhoods of Carroll Gardens, Red Hook, and Cobble Hill and parts of Staten Island. In the mid-1970s, Gallo and Frank Illiano transferred from the Gallo crew of the Colombo crime family to the Genovese family. Gallo's co-capo Illiano died of natural causes in 2014.
- Rosario "Ross" Gangi — former capo operating in Manhattan, Brooklyn, and New Jersey. Gangi was involved in extortion activities at the Fulton Fish Market.
- Andrew "Andy Wilson" Gargiulo (born 1939) — soldier. In December 1993, Gargiulo was indicted for operating a sports betting ring reputedly worth $86 million annually in cooperation with the Gambino, Colombo and Lucchese families. According to the FBI and the Brooklyn District Attorney's Office, Gargiulo was the most successful bookmaker on the East Coast during the early 1990s. In 1994, Gargiulo was sentenced to serve a one-to-three year prison sentence with $1.5 million in restitution. In July 2006, Gargiulo was sentenced to 20 years in prison for stabbing to death Preston Geritano in April 2004.
- Andrew Gigante (born September 1956) — soldier. Gigante is the son of Vincent Gigante, the former boss of the Genovese family. In July 2003, Gigante was sentenced to two years in prison for racketeering and extortion with a $2 million fine.
- John "Little John" Giglio (born April 11, 1958); also known as "Johnny Bull" – soldier involved in loansharking.
- Frank J. "Frankie G" Giovinco (born March 1967) — soldier. In December 2019, Giovinco was convicted of extortion. According to the indictment, Giovinco had operated infiltration of the waste carting industry in New York on behalf of the Genovese family since at least the early 1990s until 2017. Giovinco was also accused of committing extortion, fraud and bribery whilst serving his tenure at 2 different labor unions, including the extortion of a union president and demanding over $10,000, and in June 2020, Giovinco was sentenced to 4 years in prison with 3 years of supervised release.
- Peter "Lodi Pete" Leconte (born 1970) — soldier. In November 2013, Leconte pled guilty to extortion regarding control over the commercial waste-hauling industry in New York and New Jersey, along with the Lucchese and Gambino families.
- Daniel "Danny the Lion" Leo — a former acting boss and member of the Purple Gang of East Harlem in the 1970s. In the late 1990s, Leo joined Vincent Gigante's circle of trusted capos. With Gigante's death in 2005, Leo became "acting boss". In 2008, Leo was sentenced to five years in prison on loansharking and extortion charges. In March 2010, Leo received an additional 18 months in prison on racketeering charges and was fined $1.3 million. He was released on January 25, 2013.
- Alan "Baldie" Longo — former capo of a Brooklyn crew who formerly served under "Allie Shades" Malangone and ran rackets out of a social club that he owned in Brooklyn. Longo was involved in stock fraud and white-collar crimes in Manhattan and Brooklyn. On April 25, 2001, Longo was indicted on racketeering charges, along with Colombo acting boss Alphonse Persico, based on the work of undercover informant Michael D'Urso. Longo was convicted and sentenced to 11 years. He was released on November 24, 2010.
- Joseph "Joe Fish" Macario — soldier. Macario was indicted on August 16, 2002, along with several members of the Genovese and Bonnano families, including Genovese acting capo Carmelo Polito and Bonanno capo Anthony Pipitone.
- Alphonse "Allie Shades" Malangone — former capo operating in Manhattan and Brooklyn. Malangone during the 1990s, controlled gambling, loansharking, waterfront rackets and extorting the Fulton Fish Market. He also controlled several private sanitation companies in Brooklyn through Kings County Trade Waste Association and Greater New York Waste Paper Association. Malagone was arrested in 2000 along with several Genovese and Gambino family members for their activities in the private waste industry.
- James "Jimmy from 8th Street" Messera — former capo of the "Little Italy Crew" operating in Manhattan and Brooklyn. In the 1990s, Messera was involved in extorting the Mason Tenders union and was imprisoned on racketeering charges.
- Michael "Mike" Messina (born May 1953) — soldier. On April 26, 2022, Messina and five other codefendants, including capos Ralph Balsamo and Nicholas Calisi, soldier John Campanella, and associates Michael Poli and Thomas Poli, were indicted for operating a criminal racketeering enterprise of illegal gambling and extortion since at least 2011. Messina pled guilty to racketeering on February 9, 2023. In August 2023, Messina was sentenced to one and a half years in prison, with three years of supervised release and $200,000 in forfeiture.
- Robert "The Chef" Milano (born 1949) — soldier. In March 1973, Milano was arrested for drug charges, along with Daniel Pagano.
- Ernest Montevecchi (born 1945) — soldier. In January 2018, Montevecchi was indicted for racketeering conspiracy, and in February 2019, Montevecchi pled guilty to extortion, he was sentenced to two and a half years in prison in May 2019.
- Ernest "Ernie" Muscarella — former underboss of the family before retiring in 2025. Served as the underboss for many years. Muscarella is a former acting boss and former capo of the "116th Street Crew". In January 2002, Muscarella serving as acting boss of the family was indicted, along with capo Charles Tuzzo, members Liborio Bellomo, Thomas Cafaro, Pasquale Falcetti, Michael Ragusa and associate Andrew Gigante, for the infiltration of the International Longshoreman's Association.
- Joseph "Rudy" Olivieri (born September 1954) — soldier, operating in the "116th Street Crew" under capo Louis Moscatiello. Olivieri has been involved in extorting carpenters unions and is tied to labor racketeer Vincent DiNapoli. He was convicted of perjury. In June 2011, Olivieri was sentenced to one and a half years for perjury, after lying while under oath revolving his association with the Genovese family and for denying any knowledge of the Genovese family infiltration within the carpenter union in New York.
- Anthony "Tony D" Palumbo (born 1949) — soldier. According to law enforcement, Palumbo had once served as an acting capo for the Genovese family, active primarily in Brooklyn and New Jersey. Palumbo had been an associate of Daniel Pagano since at least the early 1990s. In August 2010, Palumbo was indicted for conspiracy to commit murder in aid of a racketeering. In May 2011, Palumbo was sentenced by former U.S. District Judge Richard J. Holwell to 10 years in prison with 3 years of supervised release in a plot of conspiracy to murder an individual associated with the Russian Mafia.
- Steven Pastore (born September 1959) — soldier. In May 2016, Pastore was indicted for illegal gambling and racketeering conspiracy, Pastore had allegedly headed the illegal gambling operation from between 2008 and 2016, Pastore pled guilty to racketeering conspiracy in February 2018, and in August 2018, Pastore was sentenced to 2 years in prison with 2 years of supervised release and $125,000 in forfeiture.
- Carmelo "Carmine Pizza" Polito — former acting capo of the "Brescio crew" operating in Manhattan and Queens. In June 2005, Polito along with Mario Fortunato were arrested for the murder of Genovese mafia associate Sabatino Lombardi in November 1994, during a card game. On August 16, 2022, Polito was indicted along with Genovese family soldier Joseph Macario, Genovese family associates Salvatore Rubino and Joseph Rutigliano, Bonnano family capo Anthony "Little Anthony" Pipitone, Bonanno family soldier Vito Pipitone, Bonanno family associate Agostino Gabriele and Nassau County Police Detective Hector Rosario. The indictment charged the group with racketeering, money laundering, illegal gambling, conspiracy, obstruction of justice, and other charges. Federal authorities allege the group used front businesses in Queens and Long Island to launder illegal profits. In a wiretapped conversation from October 2019, Polito was caught telling an underling that he was going to "put [a debtor] under the f--king bridge." Polito was released on $1.1 million bond. In March 2024, prosecutors claim that Polito violated his bail conditions meeting with associate Joseph "Joe Box" Rutigliano at a Whitestone, Queens "members only" social club on February 6, 2024, and communicating with numerous other Genovese mobsters on the phone including capo Anthony "Rom" Romanello and boss Liborio "Barney" Bellomo.
- Dean "Dino" Prestia — member operating from Brooklyn and Long Island. Prestia began his criminal career as an associate to former Bonnano family acting boss Anthony Spero in the late 1980s. Prestia later went on record with Genovese capo Rosario Gangi. On January 1, 1988, Prestia was arrested for second-degree assault.
- Joseph Queli (born September 1946) — soldier. In October 2010, Queli was indicted for loansharking, theft by extortion and money laundering, and in February 2012, Queli was sentenced to five years in prison with a fine over $57,000.
- Michael "Mickey" Ragusa — former acting underboss, reports directly to acting boss Danny Pagano. born June 22, 1965. Ragusa is a former soldier in Bellomo's Harlem/Bronx crew. In January 2002, Ragusa was indicted, along with acting boss Ernest Muscarella, capo Charles Tuzzo, members Liborio Bellomo, Thomas Cafaro, Pasquale Falcetti and associate Andrew Gigante, for the infiltration of the International Longshoreman's Association. Ragusa is a member of Bellomo's inner circle and is possible successor to the underboss position.
- James "Jimmy" Rossi (born September 1959) — soldier. In August 2009, Rossi was indicted for operating a sports betting ring between September 2007 and April 2009, which was estimated to be worth $13 million.
- Carmine "Baby Carmine" Russo — soldier. Russo was charged in November 2022, along with soldier Elio Albanese for their involvement in a scheme that involved obtaining oxycodone pills from a Midtown Manhattan doctor and having their associates sell the oxycodone on Staten Island.
- Charles Salzano — soldier. Salzano was released from prison in 2009 after serving 37 months on loansharking charges.
- John Tortora Jr. (born January 1957) — soldier. In August 2018, Tortora was indicted for racketeering conspiracy and murder charges, after he was accused of participating in the November 1997 murder of Richard Ortiz, who was stabbed to death as he was accused of cooperating with law enforcement. In December 2020, Tortora pled guilty to obstruction of justice and illegal gambling, and he was sentenced to four years in prison in January 2022.
- Ernest Varacalli (born March 1943) — soldier. In 1971, Varacalli was arrested for operating a $2 million-per-year auto theft ring, after he was accused of participating in the theft of over 1,500 vehicles. In December 2002, Varacalli was sentenced to ten years in prison with three years of probation and $1 million in restitution for operating a car theft ring estimated worth up to $5 million from a four-year period.
- Frank Vasfailo (born August 1949) — soldier. In June 2003, Vasfailo was indicted for loansharking, illegal gambling and racketeering, allegedly having operated an illegal gambling and loanshark operation between January 1993 and October 2002.
- Salvester Zarzana (born April 1964) — soldier. In April 2012, Zarzana was indicted for racketeering. He pled guilty in November 2013 to extortion conspiracy in relation to racketeering of the construction industry, and was sentenced to three years of probation.

New Jersey faction

- Michael "Mikey Cigars" Coppola — former capo of the "Fiumara-Coppola crew", He served a prison sentence at the United States Penitentiary, Atlanta for two counts of racketeering, with a projected release date of March 4, 2024. He was released from federal custody on October 20, 2022.
- Lawrence "Little Larry" Dentico — former capo operating in South Jersey and Philadelphia. Dentico was consigliere in the late 1990s through the 2000s, when he was imprisoned on extortion, loansharking and racketeering charges.
- Rocco Petrozza (born 1959) — soldier. In February 2009, Petrozza was indicted for racketeering, racketeering conspiracy, extortion and conspiracy of extortion. It is believed Petrozza was heavily active with the New Jersey faction of the Genovese family and was closely associated with Daniel Leo, who had once served as the acting boss of the family.

=== Imprisoned members ===
- Frank DiPietro (born July 1957) — soldier. In June 2023, DiPietro and associates of the Lucchese and Gambino families, Michael Sellick, Vincent Spagnuolo, Vincent Cerchio, and Samuel Sore, were arrested for stealing $2 million worth of jewellery, targeting Manhattan jewellery stores, between January and May 2023. He was charged with conspiracy, robbery and brandishing a firearm. DiPietro along with, Cerchio, Spagnuolo and Sellick had allegedly stolen at least three diamond pieces, including a 73-carat necklace, a six-carat ring and a 17-carat pair of earrings. DiPietro has had 12 prior arrests, including racketeering, and in September 1998, he was indicted for participating in the murder of George "Booty" Van Name in November 1990, along with Lucchese family soldier Anthony "Tony Bones" Loffredo, DiPietro was sentenced to 19 years in prison, and he was released in August 2016. DiPietro has a release date of August 24, 2031.
- Emilio Fusco (born October 1968) — soldier. Law enforcement allege Fusco was initiated into the Genovese family during the 1990s. Fusco was accused of extorting a business owner from the early 2000s to 2008 and received around $12,000 per month. In 2006, he was released from prison after serving almost 3 years, for racketeering, extortion and money laundering. In May 2012, Fusco was convicted of extorting several restaurants and strip clubs within the Springfield, Massachusetts area, and one count of interstate travel in aid of racketeering. In October 2012, Fusco was sentenced to 25 years imprisonment for racketeering, marijuana distribution conspiracy and extortion. At sentencing Fusco was accused of participating in the November 2003 murders of Adolfo Bruno and Gary Westerman.
- James "The Little Guy" Ida (born July 11, 1940) — According to government and law enforcement agencies, it is believed Ida was initiated into the Genovese family during the 1970s, as a soldier he allegedly reported to then-capo Matthew Ianniello, and allegedly took over the crew in 1988 following Ianniello's conviction of racketeering. Prosecutors alleged Ida helped oversee the collection of rent from vendors during the Mulberry Street fair earning around $4,000 per booth. Ida was accused of participating in 3 murders during 1988, 1991 and 1995. Around 1994 and 1995, Ida was involved in the extortion of La Toya Jackson, the sister of Michael Jackson; it is believed her husband paid Ida approximately $1,000 per month for the protection of the Genovese family, in particular for the use of Genovese family soldier John Schenone as a bodyguard. In June 1996, Ida was indicted for racketeering, he was offered a plea deal and sentence of 15-year imprisonment but refused. In October 1997, Ida was sentenced to life imprisonment and a $1 million forfeiture.
- Joseph "Joe Fish" Macario (born August 1954) — soldier. In April 2024, Macario pleaded guilty to racketeering and was accused of operating several illegal gambling parlours with Genovese family soldier, Carmelo "Carmine" Polito, who was sentenced to over 2 years in prison in December 2024, and since at least May 2012, he was the head of a lucrative illegal gambling operation in Lynbrook, New York in association with the Bonanno family, with capo Anthony "Little Anthony" Pipitone on behalf of the Bonanno family.

=== Associates ===
- Frank "Frankie Ariana" DiMattina — an associate convicted January 6, 2014, on extortion and a firearms charge and sentenced to 6 years in prison.
- Michael Poli — family associate, on April 26, 2022, Poli and five other codefendants, including capos Ralph Balsamo and Nicholas Calisi, soldiers Michael Messina and John Campanella, and associate Thomas Poli were indicted for operating a criminal racketeering enterprise of illegal gambling and extortion since at least 2011. Poli pled guilty to racketeering on February 8, 2023.
- Thomas Poli — family associate, on April 26, 2022, Poli and five other codefendants, including capos Ralph Balsamo and Nicholas Calisi, soldiers Michael Messina and John Campanella, and associate Michael Poli were indicted for operating a criminal racketeering enterprise of illegal gambling and extortion since at least 2011. Poli pled guilty to racketeering on September 29, 2022.

== Former members ==
- Dominick "Fat Dom" Alongi — former member of Vincent Gigante's "Greenwich Village Crew". Attended the La Stella Restaurant meeting.
- Salvatore "Sammy Meatballs" Aparo — a former acting capo. His son Vincent is also a "made" member of the Genovese family. In 2000, Aparo, his son Vincent, and Genovese associate Michael D'Urso met with Abraham Weider, the owner of an apartment complex in Flatbush, Brooklyn. Weider wanted to get rid of the custodians union (SEIU Local 32B-J) and was willing to pay Aparo $600,000, but Aparo's associate D'Urso was an FBI informant and had recorded the meeting. In October 2002, Aparo was sentenced to five years in federal prison for racketeering.
- John "Johnny Sausage" Barbato — former capo and former driver of Venero Mangano, he was involved in labor and construction racketeering with capos from the Brooklyn faction. Barbato was imprisoned in 2005 on racketeering and extortion charges, and released in 2008. Barbato died on May 11, 2025.
- Michael A. "Tona" Borelli — was a New Jersey mobster and former acting co-capo of Tino Fiumara's crew, along with Lawrence Ricci. Borelli controlled construction and illegal gambling rackets in New Jersey, and formerly oversaw the family's activities in the Teamsters union. Borelli died on March 21, 2020.
- Ludwig "Ninni" Bruschi — former capo operating in the South Jersey counties of Ocean, Monmouth, Middlesex, and the North Jersey counties of Hudson, Essex, Passaic and Union. Bruschi was indicted in June 2003 and paroled in April 2010. Bruschi died on April 19, 2020.
- Dominick "Quiet Dom" Cirillo — former capo and former trusted aide to boss Vincent Gigante. Cirillo belonged to the "West Side Crew" and was known as one of the Four Doms; capos Dominick "Baldy Dom" Canterino, Dominick "The Sailor" DiQuarto and Dominick "Fat Dom" Alongi. Cirillo served as acting boss from 1997 to 1998, but resigned due to heart problems. In 2003, Cirillo became acting boss, resigned in 2006 due to his imprisonment on loansharking charges. In August 2008, Cirillo was released from prison, upon which he served as family consigliere. Cirillo died on January 14, 2024.
- Vincent "Vinny" DiNapoli — soldier and former capo with the "116th Street Crew". DiNapoli was heavily involved in labor racketeering and had reportedly earned millions of dollars from extortion, bid rigging and loansharking rackets. DiNapoli dominated the N.Y.C. District Council of Carpenters and used them to extort other contractors in New York. DiNapoli's brother, Joseph DiNapoli, is the former consigliere of the Lucchese crime family.
- Dominick "Dom The Sailor" DiQuarto — former member of Vincent Gigante's "Greenwich Village Crew".
- Giuseppe Fanaro — was a member of the Morello family, who was involved in the Barrel murder of 1903. In November 1913, Fanaro was murdered by members of the Lomonte and Alfred Mineo's gangs.
- Anthony "Tough Tony" Federici — was a former capo of the "Queens crew". Federici was the owner of a restaurant in Corona, Queens. In 2004, Federici was honored by Queens Borough President Helen Marshall for his community service. While an active capo, Federici installed Anthony Romanello as acting capo to help control the illicit mob activities. Federici, the family's consigliere, died on November 9, 2022.
- Federico "Fritzy" Giovanelli — soldier who was heavily involved in loansharking, illegal gambling and bookmaking in the Queens/Brooklyn area. Giovanelli was charged with the January 1986 killing of Anthony Venditti, an undercover NYPD detective, but was acquitted. One known soldier in Giovanelli's crew was Frank "Frankie California" Condo. In 2001, Giovanelli worked with soldier Ernest "Junior" Varacalli in a car theft ring. Giovanelli died at the age of 84 on January 19, 2018.
- Joseph N. "Pepe" LaScala — former New Jersey faction capo operating from the Hudson County waterfronts cities of Bayonne and Jersey City. LaScala had been Angelo Prisco's acting capo before he took over the crew. In May 2012, LaScala and other members of his crew were arrested and charged with illegal gambling in Bayonne. LaScala died on February 3, 2019, at the age of 87.
- Rosario "Saro" Mogavero — A hitman by the age of 15, Mogavero was a powerful capo and close ally of Vito Genovese. He was the vice president of the International Longshoremen's Association until his arrest for extortion and drug dealing in 1953. Mogavero controlled gambling, loan sharking and drug smuggling along the Lower East Side of Manhattan waterfront in the 1950s and 1960s along with Tommy "Ryan" Eboli, Michael Clemente and Carmine "the Snake" Persico.
- Arthur "Artie" Nigro — former member who served as the family's "street boss" from 2002 to 2006, Nigro was sentenced to life in prison in 2011 for ordering the 2003 murder of Adolfo Bruno. Nigro died on April 24, 2019, at the age of 74.
- Rocco "the Old Man" Pellegrino — former capo. Pellegrino was head of the Genovese family's rackets in Westchester County, operating from White Plains. He was also the organization's liaison to the Dallas crime family. Pellegrino died in 1975.
- Ciro Perrone — a former capo. In 1998, Perrone was promoted to captain taking over Matthew Ianniello's old crew. In July 2005, Perrone along with Ianniello and other members of his crew were indicted on extortion, loansharking, labor racketeering and illegal gambling. Perrone ran his crew from a social club and Don Peppe's restaurant in Ozone Park, Queens. In 2009, Perrone lost his retrial and was sentenced to five years for racketeering and loan sharking.
- John "Zackie" Savino — born in 1898 in Bari, Apulia, in southern Italy. He immigrated to the United States in 1912 and settled in Harlem, Upper Manhattan. He later moved to the Bronx area. Savino reportedly served under Genovese capo Jimmy Angelina. He died in the late 1970s or 1980s.
- Frank "Farby" Serpico — born in 1916 in Corona, Queens. Serpico was a member of the "116th Street Crew" of the Genovese family. He was promoted to acting boss or street boss by Vincent Gigante from 1998 to 2001 He died in 2002.
- Charles "Chuckie" Tuzzo — capo operating in New Jersey, Brooklyn and Manhattan. In 2002, Tuzzo was indicted with Liborio Bellomo, Ernest Muscarella and others for infiltrating the International Longshoremen's Association (ILA) local in order to extort waterfront companies operating from New York, New Jersey, and Florida. On October 21, 2014, Tuzzo along with soldier Vito Alberti were indicted in New Jersey on loansharking, gambling and money laundering charges.
- Eugene "Charles" Ubriaco — was a member of the Morello family, who lived on East 114th Street. Ubriaco was arrested in June 1915 for carrying a revolver and was released on bail. On September 7, 1916, Ubriaco along with Nicholas Morello met with the Navy Street Gang in Brooklyn and they both were shot to death on Johnson Street in Brooklyn.
- Joseph Zito — soldier in the Manhattan faction (the "West Side Crew") under capo Rosario Gangi. Zito was involved in bookmaking and loansharking business. Law enforcement labeled Zito as acting underboss from 1997 through 2003, but he was probably just a top lieutenant under official underboss Venero Mangano. In the mid-1990s, Zito frequently visited Mangano in prison after his conviction in the Windows Case. Zito relayed messages from Mangano to the rest of the family leadership. Zito died at the age of 83 on April 7, 2020.

== Government informants and witnesses ==
- Joseph "Joe Cargo" Valachi — former soldier. Valachi exposed the inner workings of the American Mafia in 1963. Valachi was active since the Castellammarese War during the early 1930s, as an associate of the Lucchese crime family; however; after the murder of Salvatore Maranzano in 1931, he joined the Genovese family. Valachi was a soldier in the crew of Anthony Strollo. In 1959, Valachi was sentenced to 15 years' imprisonment for narcotics involvement. He feared that crime family boss and namesake, Vito Genovese, ordered a murder-contract on him in 1962. Valachi and Genovese were both serving prison sentences for heroin trafficking. On June 22, 1962, he murdered another prisoner in the yard, whom he mistook for Joseph DiPalermo, a Mafia member he believed was tasked to kill him. Facing the death penalty, Valachi testified before the United States Senate Committee in 1963. He died in 1971 of a heart attack while imprisoned at FCI La Tuna.
- Vincent "Fish" Cafaro — former capo and close associate of Anthony Salerno. Cafaro was a heroin dealer before joining the Genovese family. He was a protégé of Genovese high-ranking member Salerno. Cafaro was inducted into the Genovese crime family in 1974. He was assigned to Salerno's crew and operated out of East Harlem. For over a decade, Cafaro had influence within the N.Y.C. District Council of Carpenters. Along with Genovese and Gambino members, he received kickback payments. After fellow conspirator and Genovese capo Vincent DiNapoli was sentenced to prison, Cafaro became even more powerful and wealthy; however, he was eventually forced to give DiNapoli some custom within the Carpenter Council. After his 1986 indictment, he wore a wire for five months for the FBI. In 1990, he testified against Gambino boss John Gotti, who ordered the shooting of a Carpenter Council official in 1986.
- Peter "Blackheart" Savino — former associate. Savino was the owner of Arista Window Company and a primary Genovese family representative in the lucrative window-installation industry, which four of the Five Families infiltrated by controlling labor unions and rigging bids to win contracts from the New York City Housing Authority. He was initially a member of Rosario Palmieri's "crew" and an associate of Gerard Pappa before he was transferred to Vincent Gigante's faction after Palmieri was demoted from capo to soldier in 1980. In 1987, Savino was implicated in two murders by a former business partner-turned-federal informant and agreed to cooperate with authorities in exchange for leniency. He accepted a plea bargain in which he confessed to partaking in six homicides between 1977 and 1980, pleading guilty to murder and racketeering charges. Savino acted as an informant between 1987 and 1989, wearing a concealed microphone to help prosecutors build a case against Genovese boss Gigante and other senior mafiosi. Savino entered the Federal Witness Protection Program when he became a government witness in 1989. A total of thirteen mobsters, including Gigante and Peter Gotti of the Gambino family, were indicted as a result of Savino's cooperation. In August 1990, while Peter Savino was serving as a key witness in a trial of Genovese and Gambino members, a gasoline bomb was found in the vehicle of his estranged wife, Suzanne Savino, in Brooklyn. He was a major witness against Gigante at trial in July 1997. Because Savino was suffering from the advanced stages of terminal lung, liver and pelvic cancer, he was permitted by judge Jack B. Weinstein to testify through closed-circuit television from an undisclosed location rather than attend the trial at Brooklyn federal courthouse. Savino died on September 30, 1997, aged 55, while residing in a secret location under witness protection.
- John "JB" Bologna — former associate. He began cooperating in 1996 as a tipster for the FBI. He was primarily active in the Springfield, Massachusetts, area and served as an associate to Genovese capo Adolfo Bruno. Bologna was sentenced to eight years in prison; some of his charges included murder conspiracy, illegal gambling, extortion and racketeering. He died in prison on January 17, 2017.
- Michael "Cookie" D'Urso — former associate involved in loansharking, fraud, and murder. He wore a Rolex with a recording wire from 1998 to 2001 after he was arrested for driving the getaway car and supplying the gun in the 1996 murder of John Borelli. By 2007, his testimony has led to over 70 convictions. In March 2007, he was sentenced to 5 years probation and a $200 fine for the murder. D'Urso reportedly informed on the Genovese family after he was shot in the head over a gambling debt and his cousin Tino Lombardi was shot dead.
- George "The Jet" Barone — former soldier. Barone was allegedly a founding member of the real-life Jets street gang. In February 1954 while working as a longshoreman recruiter, Barone and a few friends caught and cornered William Torres, who was dissatisfied that he was not hired. Barone repeatedly hit Torres with a metal bar. Police charged him with felonious assault; however, it was later dropped to disorderly conduct. At a meeting with the Gambino crime family in the late 1960s, it was agreed upon that the Gambino family would own the Brooklyn and Staten Island waterfronts, and the Genovese family would control the Manhattan and New Jersey waterfronts. By the early 1970s, Barone was the official Genovese representative for the Genovese-owned waterfronts and was a soldier for the family. By the late 1970s, he controlled the Florida waterfront. In 1979, he was sentenced to 15 years in prison for racketeering; however, he only served seven years behind bars. Shortly after his 2001 indictment for extortion and racketeering, Barone decided to cooperate in April 2001 after being "put on the shelf" by the Genovese hierarchy. He testified against Gambino captain Anthony Ciccone in 2003. He had participated in nearly 20 murders. In 2009, he testified against Genovese capo Mikey Coppola. Barone died in December 2010 at the age of 86.
- Louis Moscatiello Sr. — former acting capo and soldier active in the Bronx. He was in charge of the Genovese infiltration of the drywall and construction industry. In 1991, he was convicted of bribing a labor official. He took a plea deal in 2004 and cooperated with the government. He was set to testify against Joseph Olivieri, a Genovese family soldier; however, he died in February 2009.
- Renaldi Ruggiero — former capo who headed the South Florida crew. It is noted that in 2003, he gave the approval to extort $1.5 million from a South Florida businessman, who was held for ransom in the office of Genovese associate, Francis J. O'Donnell, and a gun was held to his head, in October 2003. The South Florida businessman was beaten up and had all of his fingers broken; one of his hands were severely damaged and he was then threatened to pay the money by the following week, implying that he would be murdered if he failed to follow through. It was also noted that Ruggiero was active in loan sharking, and was charging 40 of his customers between 52 and 156 percent interest. He was arrested in 2006 alongside six other Genovese members and associates, including Albert Facchiano who was aged 96 at the time, for several crimes, including extortion, armed robbery and money laundering. He faced 120 years in prison, if convicted. Ruggiero cooperated with the government in February 2007 and broke his oath of omerta by admitting his involvement with the American Mafia and that he served as a capo for the Genovese family, as part of his plea deal. In February 2012, he was sentenced to 14 years' imprisonment; however, prosecutors recommended that Ruggiero should serve half of the sentence because of his cooperation, which the judge accepted.
- Felix Tranghese — former capo and soldier. Tranghese was proposed for membership into the Genovese family in 1982 by Adolfo Bruno. He cooperated with the government in 2010, as a result of being "shelved" in the year of 2006. He admitted to receiving the message of the murder contract on Western Massachusetts capo Adolfo Bruno from high-ranking members of the Genovese family in New York, and to delivering the message to Bruno's crew. He also admitted to carrying out extortion and several shootings on behalf of former Genovese street boss, Arthur Nigro. In 2011 and 2012, he returned to New York to testify in 2 separate murder trials, alongside Anthony Arillotta.
- Anthony "Bingy" Arillotta (born on April 2, 1968) — former soldier. Arillotta was born in Six Corners in Springfield, Massachusetts, his family hailed from Calabria and Rimini, he was also related to Danny Vitarelli and Michael Siano. In 1985, Arillotta was arrested but not charged in relation to trafficking cocaine from Florida. In 1990, Arillotta was sentenced to 5 years in prison for weapons charges, in particular he was found guilty of firing a gun out of a car, whilst in prison, Arillotta was involved in drug dealing, beating convicted rapists and distributing contraband, he had also met New England family members in prison, Ronald Cassesso and Peter Joseph Limone, and he also had been introduced to the Geas brothers, whom are known for murdering Boston gangster and FBI informant, James "Whitey" Bulger, in October 2018. Upon release from prison, Arillotta was associated Al Bruno and was placed "on record" with the Genovese family after a meeting with Genovese family capo, Francesco "Skyball" Scibelli. In mid-1992, Arillotta participated in the stabbing of Springfield Police Department officer, Joe Garafolo, following a dispute between Garafolo's sister and Genovese family associate, Gerald "Igor" Daniele, several months after, Arillotta was arrested for assault and participating in home invasions. By the 1990s, Arillotta was heavily involved in illegal gambling, loansharking, and trafficking cocaine and marijuana, and was involved with Italian-Camorra affiliates, Giuseppe "Joe Villa" Manzi and Antonio Manzi. In 1993, Arillotta married Irene Berardi. Arillotta was introduced to Genovese family capo, Carlo Mastrototaro, through Al Bruno, and attended several meetings with Patriarca family members, Luigi Manocchio, Carmen DiNunzio, Peter Limone and Frederick Simone. In 1995, Arillotta became acquainted with Gary Westerman through Fotios "Freddy" Geas. In 1996, Arillotta's home was raided by the narcotics squad of the Springfield Police Department, and handgun ammunition and 40lb of marijuana was seized, he was released on $100,000 bail. It is believed by the late 90s that Arillotta was "shelved" by the administration of the family, however he still engaged in illegal gambling and narcotics with Mafia affiliates, including with Genovese family associate, Eugene "Rooster" O’Nofrio, Bonanno family member, John Spirito Sr., and with the Patriarca-New England family. In 1998, Arillotta was acquitted from the ammunition-marijuana seizure. In February 1998, Arillotta met with Al Bruno at the Cara Mia restaurant concerning Arillotta receiving 50% from the profits of the loansharking and sports betting operations, and he had delegated David "Chicky" Cecchetelli and Donald Pepe to manage the day-to-day operation of the sports betting operations. In late 2001, Arillotta attended a meeting among Arthur Nigro, Pasquale DeLuca, Felix Tranghese and Joseph Basile, where Bruno was made the new capo of the Springfield faction. In around November or December 2001, Arillotta had severely assaulted John Walczak, as Genovese family associate, Anthony Scibelli, had informed Arillotta that Walczak was seen at a restaurant with the wife of Arillotta. In May 2003, Arillotta and Ty Geas shot and wounded Cement Masons Union shop steward Frank Dadabo, over a dispute between Dadabo and Arthur Nigro. In August 2003, Arillotta was inducted into the Genovese family at a ceremony held in the Bronx, New York, the attendees were Nigro, Pasquale DeLuca and Steven Alfisi. In November 2003, Westerman was lured to the home possibly owned by Richard "Dicky" Jolivet or by Genovese family associate, Joseph Iellamo. Geas had shot Westerman once in the head and failed, however Arillotta and Emilio Fusco beat Westerman to death with shovels. In November 2003, Arillotta was indicted for illegal gambling and loansharking. By at least 2004, Arillotta may have had served as the unofficial leader of the Springfield faction and took control of the illegal gambling business, loansharking operations, extortion victims and sportsbooks as well as some restaurants and bars where Al Bruno had been a partner. Arillotta later discovered that his friend and Genovese family associate, Antonio Capua, shot at his house in August 2003 on the orders of Antonio Manzi, however Manzi was arrested for drug trafficking before he was set to be murdered. In March 2005, he was indicted for illegal gambling involvement, which took place from between October 2001 and April 2003, he was arrested along with David Cecchetelli and Louis Naioleari, he pled guilty in illegal gambling and loansharking in October 2005 and was sentenced in December 2005 to 42 months in prison, and served stints at the MCI Concord and MCI Gardner, whilst in prison, Arillotta delegated the crew operations to Ralph and Amedeo Santaniello, Richard Valentini, Ryan "Shakes" Fattini and John Rodier and was earning roughly $100,000 per month from legitimate interests, drug dealing and vending machines. In 2007, he was released from prison. In April 2007, he was indicted for extortion, and was acquitted in January 2008. In February 2010, he was indicted along with Arthur Nigro and Steven Alfisi for racketeering, extortion and murder, he was released from the Metropolitan Correctional Center in New York in March 2010, and pleaded not guilty to murder in late March of 2010, on the last day of March 2010, Arillotta began formal cooperation with the FBI and assisted the FBI with the discovery of Westerman's corpse in April 2010. In 2011 and in 2012, Arillotta testified against Arthur Nigro and Emilio Fusco. In March 2014, he was sentenced to 99 months in prison and was released in 2017. As of 2026, Arillotta is the founder of Pazzo Wine, a wine company.
- Anthony Zoccolillo — former associate of the Genovese and Bonanno families, Zoccolillo was arrested in 2013 and charged with running an illegal gambling scheme and distributing marijuana and oxycodone.
- Anthony "Tony Lodi" Cardinalle — former associate. In 2013, he was one out of 32 mob members and associates in a crackdown over commercial waste hauling in New York and New Jersey. Cardinalle pleaded guilty in December to the two counts in which he was charged with racketeering conspiracy and conspiracy to commit extortion, admitting his role in a plot to shake down a cooperating witness who owned a waste hauling company.

== Factions and territories ==
The Genovese family operates primarily in the New York City area; their main rackets are illegal gambling and labor racketeering.

- New York City — The Genovese family operates in all five boroughs of New York as well as in Suffolk, Westchester, Rockland, and Orange Counties in the New York suburbs. The family controls many businesses in the construction, trucking and waste hauling industries. It also operates numerous illegal gambling, loansharking, extortion, and insurance rackets. Small Genovese crews or individuals have operated in Albany, Delaware County, and Utica. The Buffalo, Rochester and Utica crime families or factions traditionally controlled these areas. The family also controls gambling in Saratoga Springs.
- Connecticut — The New Jersey faction of the Genovese family became the dominant criminal force in New Haven during the 1930s. The Springfield faction of the family later expanded south into Hartford. The Genovese family has long operated trucking and waste hauling rackets in New Haven. In 1981, Gustave "Gus" Curcio and his brother were indicted for the murder of Frank Piccolo, a member of the Gambino crime family. In 2006, Genovese acting boss Matthew "Matty the Horse" Ianniello was indicted for trash hauling rackets in New Haven and Westchester County, New York.
- Massachusetts — Springfield, Massachusetts has been a Genovese territory since the family's earliest days. The most influential Genovese leaders from Springfield were Salvatore "Big Nose Sam" Curfari, Francesco "Frankie Skyball" Scibelli, Adolfo "Big Al" Bruno, and Anthony Arillotta (turned informant 2009). In Worcester, Massachusetts, the most influential capos were Frank Iaconi and Carlo Mastrototaro. In Boston, Massachusetts, the New England or Patriarca crime family from Providence, Rhode Island, has long dominated the North End of Boston, but has been aligned with the Genovese family since the Prohibition era. In 2010, the FBI convinced Genovese mobsters Anthony Arillotta and Felix L. Tranghese to become government witnesses. They represent only the fourth and fifth Genovese made men to have cooperated with law enforcement. The government used Arillotta and Tranghese to prosecute capo Arthur "Artie" Nigro and his associates for the murder of Adolfo "Big Al" Bruno.
- Florida — The family is active in South Florida

=== Crews ===
- 116th Street Crew — led by Pasquale "Uncle Patty" Falcetti (operates in the East Bronx)
- Broadway Mob — operated in Manhattan
- Greenwich Village Crew — former crew of Vincent Gigante (operates in Greenwich Village, Lower Manhattan)
- New Jersey faction — operates in New Jersey
- Springfield faction — operates in Springfield, Massachusetts

== List of murders committed by the Genovese crime family ==
Name	Date	Reason
Gerard Vernotico & Antonio Lonzo	March 6, 1932	Vito Genovese ordered the murder of Vernotico and Lonzo, Peter Mione and Michael Barrese strangled the duo and were found on the rooftop at 124 Thompson Street in Manhattan. It is believed Vernotico was killed for refusing to end his relationship with Genovese's ex-wife.
Ferdinand "The Shadow" Boccia	September 19, 1934	It is believed Genovese killed Boccia as Boccia demanded $35,000 from Genovese as he introduced him to a wealthy man, who was then defrauded by Genovese during a rigged card game. According to the testimony of Ernest "The Hawk" Rupolo, Rupolo implicated Genovese and himself in the murder, shooting Boccia inside of a coffee shop in Brooklyn.
Peter LeTempa	January 15, 1945	It is believed Vito Genovese ordered the murder of LeTempa to prevent him testifying against Genovese regarding the Boccia murder in 1934. LeTempa was found poisoned to death in prison.
Joseph Scottoriggio	November 11, 1946	Scottoriggo served as a Republican district captain for East Harlem. Depending on the source, Scottoriggo was beaten by 2 or 4 men on election day, and died in hospital 6 days later, succumbing to his injuries. Joseph "Tough Joey" Rao and Michael "Trigger Mike" Coppola were implicated in the murder.
William "Billy Jinks" Cardinale	January-February, 1951	It is believed Cardinale was murdered by Ruggiero "Richie the Boot" Boiardo, Anthony "Little Pussy" Russo, and Anthony "Tony Boy" Boiardo as Ruggiero Boiardo allegedly wanted Cardinale murdered, thus his position as a captain in New Jersey, since the 1940s, was ultimately replaced by Russo.
Willie Moretti	October 4, 1951	Moretti was shot between 4 and 6 times and killed inside of a restaurant in Cliffside Park, New Jersey. It is believed Moretti was killed as his advanced-stage syphilis caused him to be indiscreet and talkative concerning Cosa Nostra affairs.
Eugenio "Eugene" Giannini	September 20, 1952	Giannini was a soldier in the Lucchese family, and later became an informant for the U.S. Federal Bureau of Narcotics, he gave the Bureau of Narcotics information regarding Charles Luciano and the heroin trade. According to the testimony of Joe Valachi in the early 1960s, himself, Joseph Pagano, Pasquale Pagano and Fiore Siano were the perpetrators. Giannini was found shot once in the head in a gutter located at 221 East 107th Street., in East Harlem, New York City.
Paul Caravello	October 25, 1952	Caravello was involved in drug trafficking with intent to supply in the East Harlem area. Caravello was possibly killed to prevent him from testifying against Charles Luciano, or as a revenge plot for the murder of his brother, although the murder of Caravello remains unsolved. Caravello's body was found in a vacant lot in Pelham Bay, the Bronx, shot and killed.
Steven Franse	June 18-19, 1953	Franse was strangled to death by Pasquale Pagano and Fiore Siano, according to Joe Valachi's testimony, located 164 East 37th Street in Manhattan, he was found in the back seat of his car. The murder of Franse was ordered by Vito Genovese, as he laid the blame on Franse as the instigator for Genovese's ex-wife who filed for a divorce in court.
Anthony Carfano	September 25, 1959	Carfano was a captain in the Genovese family. It is believed Vito Genovese ordered the murder of Carfano as he had refused to attend a meeting with Don Vito Genovese and the other Genovese family captain's, and that Carfano was against the attempted assassination of Frank Costello, a plot orchestrated by Genovese to take over the crime family. Carfano was shot 4 times and killed inside of his 1959 Cadillac vehicle in Queens, New York, Carfano's 25-year old girlfriend, Janice Drake, was also in his car and was shot dead.
Anthony Castellito	June, 1961	Castellito was the Secretary-Treasurer of the Teamsters Local 560 in Union City, New Jersey. It is believed Castellito was ordered murdered by Anthony "Tony Pro" Provenzano as Castellito posed as a threat to Provenzano's leadership as the President of Teamster Local 560. Castellito was allegedly beaten before he was strangled to death by Salvatore Briguglio, Salvatore Sinno and Harold Konigsberg.
Anthony "Tony Bender" Strollo	April 8, 1962	Strollo was a captain in the Genovese family. Strollo had been an associate of Vito Genovese since the 1920s, and later took control of the Greenwich Village crew. Strollo had once served as the acting underboss of the Genovese family in the 1930s. Strollo was possibly killed as a result of a power shift, and that he had played a part in framing Vito Genovese for drug trafficking in 1959, another theory is that Strollo had cheated Vito Genovese out of drug or illegal gambling profits.
Ernest "The Hawk" Rupolo	August 27, 1964	Rupolo had served as a hitman for the Genovese family. Rupolo was found killed in Jamaica Bay, New York with gunshot and stab wounds, he was also found with two concrete blocks to his legs and his hands tied. Law enforcement have accused John "Sonny" Franzese as the killer as a favor to Vito Genovese.
John Biello	March 17, 1967	Biello had served as a captain of the Genovese family based in Miami, Florida. Biello was a friend of Bonanno family boss and namesake, Joe Bonanno, however it is believed Bonanno ordered the murder of Biello as he and Joe Colombo had revealed Bonanno's plot to the Commission that Bonanno had been plotting to take over the Commission from Carlo Gambino. Biello was shot 4 times and killed as he was entering his car in a parking lot in Miami, by George Barone.
Peter Mantello, Patsy Collucci & Nicholas Collucci	October 14, 1967	Tino Fiumara shot Mantello, Patsy Collucci and Nicholas Collucci at the 309 club, located at 309 Lafayette Street, in Newark, New Jersey.
Frank Tuminaro & Frank Gangi	August 15, 1968	Tuminaro and Gangi were both shot in the head and killed by Genovese family soldier Charles Gagliodotto, allegedly in a narcotics ring dispute.
Louis D. Saperstein	September 13, 1968	Saperstein was poisoned and killed in a hospital after he began cooperating with the FBI.
Robert Harris	January-March, 1969	Harris was a black civic leader and bookmaker. Tino Fiumara had beaten Harris to death with a baseball bat, Harris had his skull crushed, spine broken, with multiple fractured ribs. Harris was allegedly murdered during a dispute over bookmaking.
John Malanga	November 24, 1973	Malanga was an associate of Richard Boiardo. Malanga was found shot once and killed inside of his car on Third Street near First Avenue in Newark.
Danny Evangelista	May, 1976	Evangelista served as a member and informal leader of Teamsters Local 385. It is believed Evangelista was murdered for opposing the leadership of Theodore Maritas, who was picked by the Genovese family to serve as the Presidency for the district council.
Vincent Capone	July 1, 1976	39-year-old loan shark Capone was shot fifteen times by two gunmen in his Cadillac when he stopped at a red light in Hoboken, New Jersey. He had been expected to turn state's evidence in an investigation against Genovese mobster John DiGilio.
Thomas "Tommy D" Devaney	July 20, 1976	Devaney was killed during a dispute between the Genovese family and the Hell's Kitchen Irish mob, led by Mickey Spillane, for control of rackets on the West Side of Manhattan. Set up by George Barone, Devaney was shot by hitman Joseph Sullivan in a bar on Lexington Avenue.
Edward "Eddie the Butcher" Cummiskey	August 20, 1976	Cummiskey, an enforcer for Spillane, was shot in the back of the head by Sullivan while drinking in a bar in Hell's Kitchen.
Frank Chin	January 20, 1977	Chin, a 48-year-old wiretap expert, had been hired by DiGilio to screen his offices for listening devices and to build wiretaps which were planted in the offices of several defense attorneys. He was shot six times in the head in the basement of his Manhattan apartment building because he was scheduled to testify against DiGilio in a federal case.
Thomas "Tommy the Greek" Kapatos	January 22, 1977	A member of Spillane's gang, Kapatos was gunned down by Sullivan while walking along 34th Street in Manhattan.
Thomas Palermo	March 25, 1977	36-year-old Palermo was shot three times and left in the trunk of a rented car at Kennedy Airport over a $45,000 debt owed to Anthony Salerno.
Richard B. Schwartz	October 12, 1977	48-year-old Schwartz, the stepson of Meyer Lansky, shot and killed Craig Teriaca, the son of Genovese soldier Vincent Teriaca, during a barroom dispute in the lounge of the Forge restaurant in Miami Beach, Florida on June 30, 1977. Three months later, Schwartz was killed by a shotgun blast to the chest as he sat in his car outside the Inside, a restaurant he owned at 1009 Kane Concourse in Bay Harbor Islands, Florida. The murder was allegedly ordered by Vincent Teriaca with Lansky's consent, and carried out by Enrique "Ricky" Prado, with Jon Roberts and Gary Teriaca, another son of Vincent Teriaca, acting as accomplices.
Gino Gallina	November, 1977	Gallina had served as a former assistant district attorney in Manhattan. It is believed Gallina was shot between 7 and 8 times and killed in Greenwich Village, as he was a key witness before a Newark grand jury.
Pasquale Macchiarole	March, 1978	Macchiarole served as a captain for the Genovese family and was closely associated with James "Jimmy Nap" Napoli. Macchiarole was found shot and killed in the trunk of his Lincoln Continental vehicle, located at the corner of Skidmore Avenue and Rockaway Parkway, in a parking lot outside of a supermarket, located at in Canarsie, Brooklyn. It is believed Macchiarole was killed for attempting to take control of the Teamsters Local 560 from Tony Provenzano.
Anthony "Little Pussy" Russo	April 26, 1979	Russo allegedly served as a soldier for the Genovese family under the crew of captain, Richard Boiardo. It is believed Russo was shot 4 times in the head and killed for vouching for Patrick Pizzuto, who later became an informant.
Salvatore "Midgie" Annunziato	June 19, 1979	Annunziato, a New Haven, Connecticut-based Genovese capo, disappeared after he was picked up outside his East Haven home by fellow Genovese mobster Thomas Vastano ahead of a purported meeting with Patriarca family gangster William Grasso. Annunziato had allegedly robbed a series of gambling dens controlled by Grasso.
Gerard "Jerry" Pappa	July 10, 1980	It is believed Pappa was shot once in the head by a sawed-off shotgun and killed in Borough Park, Brooklyn as revenge for murdering Thomas "Shorty" Spero in February 1980, a soldier for the Colombo family, and Richard Scarcella in July 1980, an associate of the Colombo family.
Irwin "The Fat man" Schiff	August 8, 1987	Schiff was an associate of the Lucchese and Gambino families. Schiff was found shot twice in the head and killed inside of a restaurant located at Second Avenue near 75th Street. It is believed Schiff was murdered due to owing the Mob a large sum of money.
Daniel Conlin	August 12, 1987	Conlin was the President of Teamsters Local 891. It is believed the murder of Conlin was ordered and orchestrated by Bobby Manna, Rocco Napoli and Martin Casella.
Anthony "Hickey" DiLorenzo	November 25, 1988	Genovese soldier DiLorenzo was shot in the backyard of his home in West New York, New Jersey. His murder was ordered by James Ida after he was suspected of becoming an informant.
Ralph DeSimone	June 13, 1991	Ida ordered Genovese associate DeSimone killed because he suspected him of being an informant. DeSimone was allegedly killed in New Jersey. He was found shot to death in the trunk of his car at LaGuardia Airport.
Ralph Anthony Coppola	September 16, 1998	41-year-old Genovese capo Coppola disappeared and was last seen near an associate's business on Stillwater Avenue in the Bronx. Liborio Bellomo allegedly sanctioned the murder of Coppola. Bollomo was charged in 2006 with ordering Coppola's murder.
Joseph Mazzotta	April 12, 2003	Mazzotta was an associate of the Genovese family. Mazzotta was found shot twice and killed inside of his office located at 77 Boston Road in Middletown, Connecticut. The murder of Mazzotta remains unsolved with several theories.
Charles Moretto	October 29, 2003	Moretto served as an associate of the Genovese family. Moretto was shot once in the head at his home located at Millionaire's Row in Lighthouse Point, Florida, during a robbery by a man posing as a buyer for his house and luxury car, Luis Orlando Martinez, an alleged career criminal who had become an informant for the ATF. Martinez was sentenced to 6 years in prison for the murder.
Gary Westerman	November 4, 2003	Westerman was an associate of the Genovese family. It is believed Westerman was shot and bludgeoned to death for cooperating with the FBI and Massachusetts State Police.
Adolfo "Big Al" Bruno	November 23, 2003	Bruno served as captain of the Springfield, Massachusetts crew for the Genovese family and is believed to have been shot to death due to internal rivalry within the Massachusetts faction, between Anthony Arilotta and the Geas brothers.
Albert "Yonkers Al" Circelli	December 22, 2003	Circelli served as a soldier for the Lucchese crime family. It is believed Genovese family associate Lou "Louie Lump Lump" Barone shot Circelli at the Rao's Italian restaurant in Harlem due to an argument.
Preston Geritano	April 22, 2004	Geritano was an associate of the Genovese family. Geritano was stabbed and killed by his brother-in-law, Andrew Gargiulo, outside of the Amici restaurant in Bay Ridge, Brooklyn. Later in July 2006, Gargiulo was sentenced to 20 years in prison.
Lawrence "Dairy Larry" Ricci	November 30, 2005	Ricci served as an acting captain based in New Jersey and was predominately active within the labor unions in Newark, New Jersey. Ricci was found shot in the head in the trunk of his car, in Union, New Jersey, around a week before his racketeering trial. It is believed Ricci was murdered as a result of not accepting a plea deal.
Rudolph "Rudy Cue Ball" Izzi	June 8, 2007	Izzi served as an associate, possible soldier, and bookmaker for the Genovese family. Izzi was found shot in the head at his Brooklyn home. The murder of Izzi remains unsolved.
Louis "Lou the Jeweler" Antonelli	April 29, 2008	Antonelli was an Staten Island jeweller and associate of the Genovese family. It is believed Antonelli was robbed of his jewellery and cash possession and shot to death by 3 men outside a Staten Island restaurant after refusing to pay tribute money to the Genovese family.
William Marcucci	May 19, 2008	Marcucci was identified as an associate of the Genovese family. Marcucci was found shot once in the head and killed outside of a restaurant in Saddle Brook, New Jersey inside of his 1999 Cadillac Deville vehicle. It is believed Marcucci was killed by his son, William Silvi, and his brother-in-law, Daniel Tunks, for over $730,000 of his life insurance money.
William Romano and Elviza Aranova	April 23, 2009	Romano was an associate of the Genovese family. Romano and his 37-year old girlfriend were killed in a double homicide, found in an apartment located at 8020 Bay Parkway in Bensonhurst, Brooklyn, Romano and Aranova were found with head injuries and blunt force trauma.
Chris Castellano	July 4, 2010	Castellano was shot once in the head and killed outside of his home located at 79th Street in Queens, New York. It is believed Castellano was murdered as he had testified against Gregorio Gigliotti, an Genovese family associate.
Mario Imbesi	March 15, 2012	Imbesi was found bludgeoned to death inside of his apartment located at Farview Avenue in Danbury, Connecticut, as Imbesi had informed on Genovese family associate, Frank Roche.
James "Whitey" Bulger	October 30, 2018	Bulger was murdered by Genovese family associate, Fotios "Freddy" Geas. Bulger began his criminal career in the early 1950s in Massachusetts, and later claimed to participating in 19 murders. In 1975, Bulger became an FBI informant, thus the reason for his murder. Bulger was apprehended by the FBI in June 2011 after he had disappeared and went into hiding in December 1994. Bulger was bludgeoned to death by using a lock placed inside a sock and a prison knife by Geas, only hours after his admittance into USP Hazelton in West Virginia.

== In popular culture ==
The Genovese crime family has a long history of portrayal in Hollywood as the subject of film and television.

=== Television ===
- Boardwalk Empire (2010-2014)
- Godfather of Harlem (2019)

=== Film ===
- Mobsters (1991)
- The Alto Knights (2025)

== Sources ==
=== Books ===
- English, T.J. (1990). The Westies: Inside New York's Irish Mob. New York City: St. Martin's Press. ISBN 978-0-312-36284-3.
- Raab, Selwyn (2005). Five Families: The Rise, Decline, and Resurgence of America's Most Powerful Mafia Empires. New York City: Thomas Dunne Books. ISBN 978-0-312-36284-3.
- McShane, Larry (2016). Chin: The Life and Crimes of Mafia Boss Vincent Gigante. New York City: Citadel Press. ISBN 9781617739217.
- DeStefano, Anthony M. (2021). The Deadly Don: Vito Genovese, Mafia Boss. New York City: Citadel Press. ISBN 9780806540931.

=== Reports ===
- Thurmond, Strom (1988). Organized Crime in America (PDF) (Report). National Institute of Justice – via United States Department of Justice.
- Zazzali, James R. (September 1990). 21st Annual Report (PDF) (Report). State of New Jersey Commission of Investigation – via Government of New Jersey.
- Richardson, A. (May 1991). Outlaw Motorcycle Gangs – USA Overview (PDF) (Report). State of California Department of Justice, Bureau of Organized Crime and Criminal Intelligence. Archived from the original (PDF) on May 26, 2023 – via United States Department of Justice.
- Schiller, Francis E. (May 2004). The Changing Face of Organize Crime in New Jersey (PDF) (Report). State of New Jersey Commission of Investigation – via Government of New Jersey.
