= Alan Longo =

American mobster

Alan Longo (born April 2, 1950) also known as Baldie is an American mobster and a former caporegime in the Genovese crime family.

== Stock scams ==
Longo ran his Brooklyn rackets out of a social club in the Carroll Gardens section of Brooklyn. During the 1990s, Longo's capo Alphonse Malangone began a lucrative stock scams on Wall Street with DeCavalcante crime family capo Philip Abramo. The mobsters earned their crime families millions of dollars. Longo and Abramo were involved in manipulating the initial public offering (IPO) of Mayfair stock. Investigators alleged that Longo and Abramo came to dominate and control Bahamian companies involved in financing such IPOs and similar transactions.

== Acting capo ==
On April 25, 2001, Longo and Colombo crime family acting boss Alphonse Persico were indicted on racketeering charges, including charges of pump-and-dump scams and loansharking. Prosecutors gathered much of their evidence through the undercover work of mob informant Michael D'Urso. D'Urso wore a wire during a four-hour sitdown meeting with Longo at a cafe concerning Longo's influence at the Fulton Fish Market. Longo also indicated that he planned on meeting with Persico upon his release from prison regarding money owed to the Genovese family by the Colombos for crimes committed at the Market.

During one taped conversation, Longo made the following observation about the Genovese Family:

"Don't let anyone tell you we're dead," Longo said. "We're not. Because Vito Genovese ain't here no more, Vincent Gigante is. We're here."

Longo was convicted and sentenced to 11 years in federal prison. Longo was released from Federal Correctional Institution, Williamsburg (FCI Williamsburg) in Salters, South Carolina on November 24, 2010. As of 2025, Longo has remained largely out of the public spotlight, with no known involvement in organized crime since his release from prison.
