= Charles Tuzzo =

American mobster

Charles "Chuckie" Tuzzo (born November 22, 1933) is a New York mobster who is a capo with the Genovese crime family.

== Criminal career ==
A reputed captain in the Genovese crime family upon the takeover by Vincent "Chin" Gigante in the 1980s, Tuzzo's criminal activities were mostly white collar crimes in Manhattan, Queens and Brooklyn. In the early 1990s, Tuzzo, former acting boss Liborio "Barney" Bellomo, and capo Ernest "Ernie" Muscarella participated in several lucrative pump-and-dump stock schemes.

== Controlling the ILA ==
In 1997, Gigante was convicted of federal racketeering charges and sentenced to 12 years in prison. With Bellomo incarcerated on similar charges and reputed Consigliere Dominick "Quiet Dom" Cirillo resigning, Muscarella became Genovese acting boss. His rise would also increase Tuzzo's influence in the Manhattan faction. In the late 1990s, Tuzzo, Muscarella and other members of the family dominated the International Longshoremen's Association (ILA) and began extorting companies such as Orex Gold Mines Corp. operating on the piers in the New York City and New Jersey metropolitan area, and in Miami, Florida. Tuzzo's other criminal activities included bid rigging, loansharking and racketeering.

== Indictments ==
In January 2002, Tuzzo, Muscarella, and Gigante were indicted on federal racketeering, conspiracy and extortion charges. The Genovese family had gained control of International Longshoremen's Association (ILA) locals in New York, New Jersey, and Miami, Florida. They used this power to extort money from shipping container repair companies and other waterfront-related businesses. Additional charges against the defendants also brought in evidence of extorting the Laborer International Union of North America, Teamsters Local 32B/J of the Building Services Workers Union and the Mason Tenders District Council of Greater New York. On April 7, 2003, Tuzzo pleaded guilty to extortion conspiracy. He was later sentenced to five years in prison. Tuzzo was released from prison on February 2, 2006. As part of his plea agreement, Tuzzo is prohibited from participating in the ILA or any waterfront-related business.
