= Daniel Leo (mobster) =

American mobster

Daniel "Danny the Lion" Leo
- Born: January 25, 1941 (age 85); New York City, New York, U.S.
- Other names: "Daniel Leonetti"; "Daniel Leonardo"; "Danny the Lion"
- Occupation: Crime boss
- Status: Released from federal custody on January 25, 2013
- Allegiance: Genovese crime family
- Criminal charges: Racketeering, loan sharking, and extortion
- Penalty: Five years' imprisonment (2008); 18 months' imprisonment and fined $1.3 million (2010)

Daniel "Danny the Lion" Leo (born January 25, 1941) is an American mobster who formerly served as the acting boss of the Genovese crime family, the biggest of New York's Five Families.

== Early life and career ==
Leo was once a member of the notorious East Harlem Purple Gang in the 1970s. He is also known as "Daniel Leonetti" and "Daniel Leonardo" (the Federal Bureau of Prisons recorded his name as "Danny Leo").

== Rise in the Genovese family ==
Leo resides in a luxurious manor in Rockleigh, New Jersey and was a suspected drug trafficker during his earlier years as a soldier in the Genovese crime family.

On June 13, 1980, Leo was indicted for refusing to answer grand jury questions in regards to the murder of 18-year-old Maurice Anzisi. Anzisi and his girlfriend were murdered in 1978 in the Bronx.

Leo was once the President of a construction company named Elite Ready Mix. Allegedly promoted to captain under the regime of Vincent "Chin" Gigante in the late 1980s or early 1990s after living a low-profile life as a faction-leader in New Jersey, he held a high position in the family with Gigante's top associates Dominick "Quiet Dom" Cirillo, James "Little Jimmy" Ida and Louis "Bobby" Manna. In 2005, Leo became the acting boss of the Genovese family.

== Indictment and prison ==
In May 2007, Leo was one of many Genovese crime family members indicted on federal loansharking and extortion charges. In early 2008, Leo pleaded guilty to racketeering and loansharking. He was sentenced to five years in prison. His projected release date was October 7, 2011, but on January 10, 2010, he pleaded guilty to racketeering charges and faced up to 40 years in prison. In March 2010, he was sentenced to an additional 18 months in prison and fined $1.3 million. Leo began serving his time at the low security facility at Federal Correctional Complex, Coleman in Florida, but was subsequently released into community corrections in Miami. He was released from federal custody on January 25, 2013.

American Mafia
| Preceded by Vincent Gigante | Genovese crime family Acting Boss; 2005–2008 | Succeeded by Liborio "Barney" Bellomo as Boss |
