= Vincenzo Terranova =

American mobster

- Born: May 15, 1886; Corleone, Sicily, Kingdom of Italy
- Died: May 8, 1922 (aged 35); New York City, U.S.
- Cause of death: Murder by gunshot
- Occupation: Crime boss
- Predecessor: Nicholas Morello
- Successor: Giuseppe Masseria
- Parents: Bernardo Terranova (father); Angelina Piazza (mother)
- Relatives: Nicholas Terranova (brother), Ciro Terranova (brother), Giuseppe Morello (half brother)
- Allegiance: Morello crime family
- Conviction: Counterfeiting (1910)

Vincenzo "the Tiger of Harlem" Terranova (May 15, 1886 – May 8, 1922) was a gangster and an early Italian-American organized crime figure in the United States. He succeeded Nicholas Morello as boss of the then Morello Gang in 1916 and was succeeded in turn by Giuseppe Masseria in 1922. He served as boss and underboss of the Morello crime family, today known as the Genovese crime family, the oldest of the Five Families in New York City.

Terranova was born in Corleone, Sicily in 1886. He was the first son of Bernardo Terranova, a member of the Mafia in Corleone, and his wife Angelina Piazza. Angelina had a son from a previous marriage, Giuseppe Morello, and would later give birth to Vincenzo's two brothers, Ciro Terranova and Nicolo Terranova. Vincenzo, Nicolo and Ciro along with other relatives emigrated to the United States, arriving in New York on March 8, 1893. Giuseppe Morello had immigrated to New York the previous year and sometime in the 1890s founded a gang known as the 107th Street Mob, which evolved into the Morello crime family. His three half brothers would eventually join him in this enterprise.

== Death ==
On May 8, 1922, Vincenzo Terranova was gunned down in a drive-by shooting near his home on East 116th Street in Manhattan. Terranova's murder is generally attributed to Umberto Valenti, a notorious hitman for the D'Aquila crime family who was trying to seize control over the family.

Vincenzo and his three brothers lie in bare graves in Cavalary Cemetery in Queens, New York, not far from Joe Petrosino, who investigated them, and other Morello crime family members, such as Ignazio "Lupo the Wolf" Lupo.

American Mafia
Preceded by Ignazio Lupo	Morello crime family Underboss; 1910–1916	Succeeded by Ciro Terranova
Preceded by Nicholas Morello	Morello crime family Boss; 1916–1920	Succeeded by Giuseppe Morello
Preceded by Ciro Terranova	Morello crime family Underboss; 1920–1922	Succeeded by Giuseppe Morello
