= James Ida =

American mobster

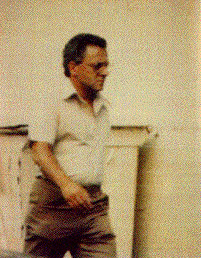
- Federal Bureau of Investigation (FBI) surveillance photograph of James Ida
- Born: July 11, 1940 (age 86); New York City, New York, U.S.
- Other name: "Little Guy"
- Occupation: Mobster
- Children: 1
- Allegiance: Genovese crime family
- Convictions: Racketeering, murder, conspiracy to murder, illegal gambling, conspiracy to control a union election by violence, extortion, interstate transportation of stolen property, mail fraud, fraud (1997)
- Penalty: Life imprisonment without the possibility of parole (1997)

Details
- Imprisoned at: Federal Medical Center, Devens, Massachusetts

James Ida also known as "Little Guy" (born July 11, 1940) is an American mobster and former consigliere of the Genovese crime family.

Ida was born to first generation immigrants from Lombardy. Growing up in the Little Italy neighborhood of Manhattan, New York, Ida was inducted into the Genovese crime family in the late 1970s. Ida was placed in the Little Italy-based crew of captain Matthew "Matty the Horse" Ianniello, frequently serving as Ianniello's bodyguard and chauffeur. Ida's younger brother Joseph also served in Ianniello's crew.

== Racketeering in Little Italy ==
In 1988, after Ianniello was convicted on federal racketeering charges, Ida took over the Ianniello crew. In 1991, after consigliere Louis Manna was convicted of federal racketeering charges, Ida became the official consigliere of the Genovese family. When boss Vincent Gigante and underboss Venero Mangano went to prison, Ida handled the day-to-day functions of the Genovese family with acting boss Liborio Bellomo. Ida also oversaw rackets involving the Mason Tenders Union and the San Gennaro Feast in Little Italy.

Each vendor working at the Feast had to pay tribute to the Genovese family. Ida helped oversee the collection of rents from some 400 vendors. While the mob typically demanded $4,000 a booth, the society running the festival would report to city officials that booth vendors had paid only $1,000 or so each. The city would then assess each vendor a 25 percent permit fee based on this rent. The result was that the city and charities received very little money.

Ida also owned a social club in Little Italy that he used for family business. However, in 1990, capo James Messera was sent to prison based partly on conversations recorded by law enforcement at the club. Ida soon switched to conducting business on walks through the neighborhood and meetings in diners and parks. To counter Ida's new strategy, Federal investigators in 1994 obtained warrants for use of roving bugs and were able to intercept six of Ida's conversations with family members and union associates.

== Protection for La Toya Jackson ==
In 1994, Ida was involved in the extortion of money from singer La Toya Jackson. According to the FBI, Jackson's husband Gordon was paying the Genovese family $1,000 per month for the use of Genovese soldier John Schenone as a "bodyguard" whenever the singer visited New York. Schenone would then present the checks to Ida. On one occasion, the FBI recorded Ida angrily complaining to Schenone about receiving a bad check from the Jacksons.

== Prison ==
In June 1996, Ida and 19 other Genovese members and associates were charged with violating the Racketeer Influenced and Corrupt Organizations Act (RICO). The government offered Ida a 15-year plea deal in exchange for cooperation, but Ida refused it. However, fellow mobster Bellomo accepted a plea agreement, reportedly enraging Ida. The FBI was sufficiently concerned about the threat to notify Bellomo's lawyer and to place Bellomo and Ida in solitary confinement. Ida's time incarcerated for the durations of his trial was spent in solitary. He connected with Pavle Stanimirovic, also known as Paul Montana and 'Punch', the son of Vojislav Stanimirović. Ida dubbed him "Paulie Cats", reminding the young and rising criminal that violence is not the way to earn respect. He had been placed in solitary for a violent cutting in Otisville Correctional Facility at the same time as the trial. However, both Bellomo's and Ida's lawyers refuted reports that there was any tension between the two mobsters.

On April 24, 1997, after an eight-week trial, Ida was convicted of the 1988 DiLorenzo murder, the conspiracies to murder Ralph DeSimone in 1991 and Dominic Tucci in 1995, and racketeering charges involving the San Gennaro Feast. Ida received a life prison sentence. After Ida's imprisonment, former capo Ianniello retook control of Ida's Little Italy crew.

In March 2012, Ida was serving life without parole at the Federal Correctional Institution, Otisville, a medium security facility in New York. As of 2026, he is serving his sentence at Federal Medical Center, Devens.

American Mafia
Preceded by Louis "Bobby" Manna	Genovese crime family Consigliere; 1989-1996	Succeeded by Lawrence Dentico
