= Genovese crime family New Jersey faction =

American organized-crime family faction

- Founded: c. 1920s
- Founder: Genovese crime family
- Founding location: Newark, New Jersey, U.S.
- Years active: c. 1920s–present
- Territory: Northern New Jersey counties of Hudson, Essex, Union, Bergen, Passaic, Middlesex, Monmouth, and Ocean
- Ethnicity: Italians as "made men" and other ethnicities as associates
- Membership (est.): 40 made members and 400 associates (2004)
- Activities: Racketeering, conspiracy, loansharking, money laundering, murder, gambling, and extortion
- Allies: Bonanno; Colombo; DeCavalcante; Detroit; Gambino; Lucchese (New Jersey faction); Philadelphia; K&A Gang
- Rivals: Various gangs in New Jersey, including their allies

The New Jersey faction of the Genovese crime family is a group of Italian-American mobsters who control organized crime activities within the state of New Jersey. The New Jersey faction is divided into multiple crews each led by a different caporegime who oversees illegal criminal activities in labor racketeering, illegal gambling, loansharking and extortion. The Genovese crime family's New Jersey faction has maintained a strong presence in the Northern Jersey area since the early prohibition era. A number of powerful mobsters within the New Jersey faction such as Guarino "Willie" Moretti, Gerardo "Jerry" Catena and Louis "Bobby" Manna have each held positions within the Genovese family's administration. From the 1990s until his death in 2010, Tino "the Greek" Fiumara was one of the most powerful caporegimes in the New Jersey faction.

== History ==
=== Prohibition era ===
Early members of the New Jersey faction were under the control of New York City's Masseria family boss Joe Masseria. In January 1920, Prohibition began and the United States government prohibited the sale of alcoholic beverages. With large illegal profits to gain many members became bootleggers and were involved in smuggling large amounts of alcohol into New York's speakeasies. At the peak of Prohibition in 1930, violence erupted between the two rival New York City families. The violence became known as the Castellammarese War, Joe Masseria with his Mafia family battled with Salvatore Maranzano, who was the boss of the Brooklyn-based Castellammarese clan, for control over all Italian gangs in the U.S. On April 15, 1931, Masseria was murdered and replaced as boss by Charles "Lucky" Luciano who ended the war with Maranzano. The members of the Masseria New Jersey faction continued working for Luciano as bootleggers. After a few months on September 10, 1931, Salvatore Maranzano was murdered and Luciano became the most powerful mobster in America. Luciano decided to restructure all the American Mafia families by establishing The Commission instead of having a Capo dei capi or "boss of all bosses".

=== Moretti and Zwillman ===
When Prohibition ended in 1933, the Luciano family's New Jersey faction expanded into other crimes. The most powerful caporegime in the faction was Guarino "Willie" Moretti who controlled numerous illegal gambling operations in New Jersey. Moretti formed an alliance with Jewish mobster Abner "Longie" Zwillman, who the media refer as the "Al Capone of New Jersey" because Zwillman had once controlled the majority of the illegal alcohol in Newark. The alliance between Moretti and Zwillman dominated illegal gambling in New Jersey.

In early 1937, Newark family boss Gaspare D'Amico fled the U.S. after a foiled hit ordered by Joseph Profaci. The Mafia Commission divided up D'Amico's territory among the Luciano (Boiardo crew), Gagliano (Jersey crew), Mangano, Bonanno, Badami family, Profaci and Philadelphia (North Jersey crew) families.

In 1937, family boss Luciano was arrested, which left Frank "the Prime Minister" Costello as the new acting boss of the family. Moretti, a cousin of Costello, was promoted to underboss. Zwillman continued to align with the Luciano family, while Moretti was replaced by Newark capo Ruggiero "Richie the Boot" Boiardo. Zwillman and Boiardo were previously enemies fighting for control of territory in Newark but the two men put there differences aside and focused on controlling illegal gambling throughout Newark. The alliance between Moretti, Zwillman and Boiardo continued to operate peacefully together for years until Moretti became mentally ill in the early 1950s. A contract hit was put on Moretti and he was executed while eating lunch on October 4, 1951. The New Jersey alliance was weakened but continued to operate between Zwillman and Boiardo.

The murder of Moretti became a key factor in weakening Frank Costello's leadership position within the Luciano family, as his only major remaining supporter was Mangano family boss Albert Anastasia. A few years earlier in 1946, Costello's strongest ally and powerful mobster Lucky Luciano was deported in to Italy. Costello promoted Vito Genovese to underboss, but Genovese believed the family belonged to him and plotted to take control from Costello. After his promotion to Underboss Genovese gained the support of Lucchese boss Gaetano "Tommy" Lucchese and Mangano underboss Carlo Gambino. In May 1957, Genovese and his allies ordered the assassination of Costello but failed and only wounded him. The attack made Costello aware that Genovese would never stop and Costello retired leaving Genovese as the new boss.

=== Catena's command ===
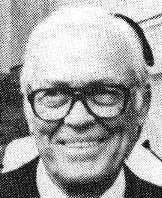
Gerardo Catena

Under Genovese's leadership, Gerardo "Jerry" Catena was promoted to underboss of the family and also oversaw the New Jersey faction. Catena, an ally of Genovese, depended on Boiardo and Angelo DeCarlo to help run the faction as his capos. In 1957, Genovese gathered the bosses of the top Mafia families for his Apalachin conference, which ended in the arrest of several bosses and the realization of a nationwide network of organized criminals. After the failed conference, Genovese was closely monitored by the government, and arrested in 1959 on a heroin conviction. Zwillman hanged himself on February 27, 1959, upon being summonsed to appear at the Valachi hearings. Most of Zwillman's illegal gambling rackets were taken over by members of the Jersey faction.

According to the Valachi hearings, the upper administration of the Genovese family included acting boss Thomas "Tommy Ryan" Eboli, Underboss Jerry Catena and consigliere Michele "Mike" Miranda. Throughout the 1960s, Catena continued to work with the upper administration. In 1970, he was subpoenaed to testify in Newark, but refused to answer any questions and was held in contempt. Catena was sentenced to five years in prison; after his 1975 release, he retired to Florida.

=== Provenzano and the Teamsters ===
Anthony "Tony Pro" Provenzano became one of the most powerful capos in New Jersey with his connection to Teamsters Union (IBT) leader Jimmy Hoffa. Provenzano served as vice president of the IBT's Union City branch during the 1950s. In that office, Provenzano was able to embezzle money from the union's pension fund, receive kickbacks from construction companies to work on sites, and use his title as a legitimate source of income. Both Provenzano and Hoffa were imprisoned in the mid-1960s for their part in the corruption of the union. In the early 1970s, both men were out from prison. On July 30, 1975, Hoffa disappeared after setting off for a secret meeting with Provenzano and Detroit's Anthony Giacalone. In 1978, Provenzano was convicted of embezzling from the union. He eventually died in prison in 1988.

=== Manna and the dispute over Atlantic City ===
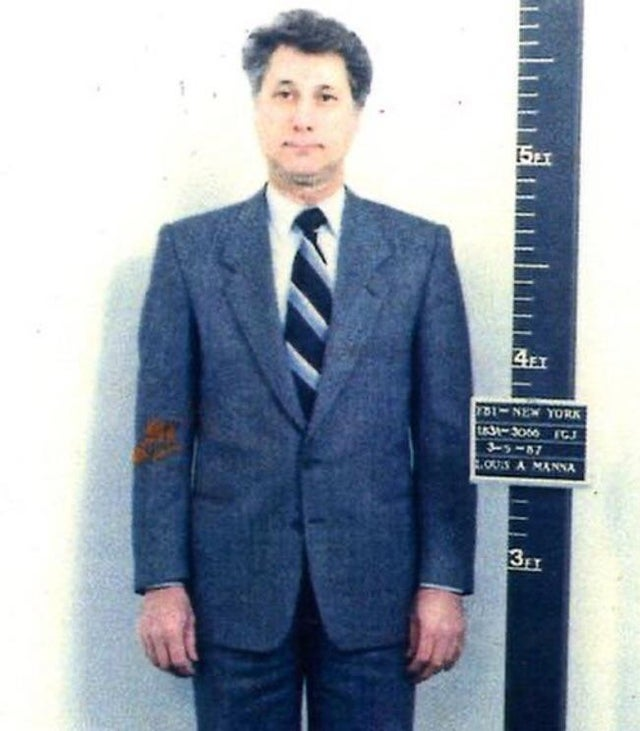
FBI Mugshot of Louis Manna

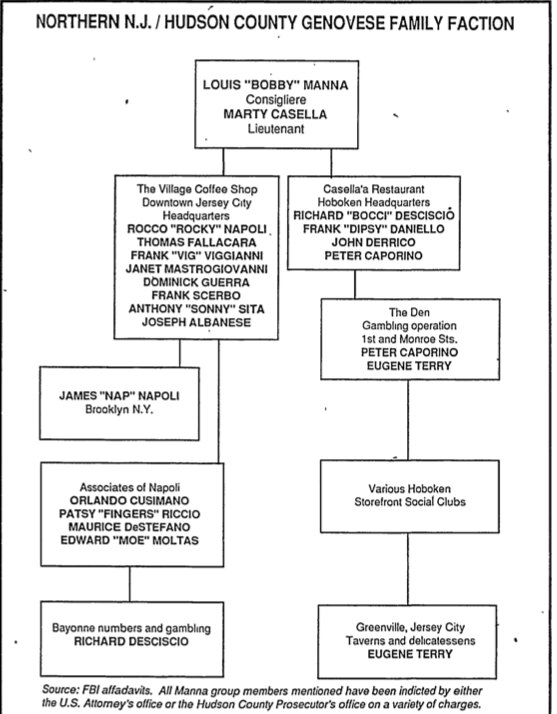
FBI chart of the Northern N.J./Hudson County Genovese family faction

In the early 1980s, Vincent "the Chin" Gigante became the Genovese family's new boss and promoted powerful New Jersey mobster Louis "Bobby" Manna to consigliere. Manna would oversee the New Jersey factions with help from his top aid Lawrence "Larry Fab" Dentico. Months later, on March 21, 1980, Philadelphia boss Angelo "Gentle Don" Bruno was murdered. The killing prompted discussions and plans by the Genovese and Gambino families to take over Bruno's criminal operations. The negotiations proceeded without incident until the murder of Gambino boss Paul "Big Paul" Castellano in late 1985. Manna was displeased over John Gotti's unsanctioned hit of Castellano and his accession as new boss, but he continued discussing the takeover of Bruno's operations.

By 1987, the relationship between the two families had deteriorated. Gotti had sent word to Manna that the Genovese family should take over Bruno's North Jersey territory and leave more profitable South Jersey operations in Philadelphia and Atlantic City to the Gambinos. Manna, enraged and insulted over the offer, began planning John and Gene Gotti's assassinations. Making matters worse was, following the murder of Genovese Jersey capo John DiGilio in May 1988, the Gambinos took over the International Longshoremen's Association. The Gambinos placed Anthony Pimpinella of Brooklyn as the new head of the union, allowing them control over the waterfront rackets at the Newark-Elizabeth port. Federal agents received information on Manna's plan to have Gotti killed and informed him on the emerging danger.

In 1989, Manna and soldier Richard (Bocci) DeSciscio were indicted for racketeering and conspiring to murder John and Gene Gotti. It was revealed during the trail that between August 1987 and January 1988, the Federal Bureau of Investigation recorded 12 conversations in which Manna and other Genovese mobsters discussed murdering John Gotti, Gene Gotti, and New York contractor Irwin Schiff. On August 8, 1987, Schiff was shot in the head while dining in a Manhattan restaurant. During one of the recorded conversations the FBI overheard Manna discussing murder plot for John Gotti, which Manna advised the hitman to wear a disguise as the target area was fairly open. On June 26, 1989, Manna convicted of conspiring to murder the John Gotti, Gene Gotti and Irwin Schiff to murder in aid of racketeering. On September 26, 1989 Judge Trump-Barry sentenced Manna to eighty years imprisonment.

Manna is currently imprisoned in the Federal Correctional Institution in Fairton, New Jersey, with a projected release date of February 20, 2056. In December 2020, Manna requested a compassionate release, but was denied.

=== Fiumara and Coppola ===
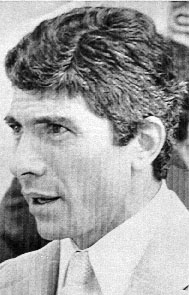
Tino Fiumara

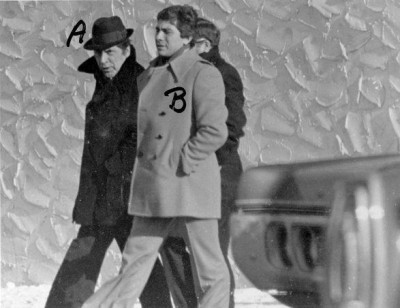
FBI surveillance photo of Tino Fiumara (B) and Joe Doto Jr (A) in the 1970s

In the mid-1970s, Tino "the Greek" Fiumara began representing many of the Genovese family's interests in the New Jersey waterfront, after years of working under caporegime Peter LaPlaca. Fiumara worked closely with Genovese family street boss Frank "Funzi" Tieri, who controlled all of the family's Northern New Jersey waterfront rackets. He also maintained a working relationship with Lucchese Jersey capo Anthony "Tumac" Accetturo. Fiumara gained control of the ILA by paying off Thomas Buzzanca, the president of ILA local members in Brooklyn and New Jersey. The connection to Buzzanca, allowed Fiumara to control Anthony Scotto, the ILA boss of Brooklyn docks. Fiumara's power continued to grow in New Jersey waterfront with the help of Michael Coppola, Michael Borelli and Joseph Doto Jr.

One of Fiumara's biggest rival for control of the waterfront rackets was Genovese family capo John DiGilio. Fiumara was convicted in 1979 of labor racketeering and federal extortion in Newark and was sentenced to 15 years in prison. He continued to hold power by promoting soldier Michael "Mikey Cigars" Coppola as acting capo. Coppola received orders from Fiumara throughout the 1980s. In 1989, Manna was imprisoned for planning the murder of John Gotti, and ordering the murder of John DiGilio.

When Fiumara was released from prison in 1994, he was one of the most powerful capos in New Jersey. In 1996, his close ally Mike Coppola was arrested on murder charges and fled becoming a fugitive. Fiumara began taking over of all the most lucrative rackets in New Jersey, including the New Jersey docks. However, in 2000, he was imprisoned for violating his parole. He promoted Lawrence Ricci and Michael A. Borelli as co-acting capos to secure his rackets and protect his power. Ricci oversaw the crew's waste removal, trucking and waterfront rackets while Borelli controlled the illegal gambling, Teamster's Union and construction rackets. After Fiumara was released from prison he moved to Long Island. In 2005, Ricci was indicted on labor racketeering charges along with two other members of the International Longshoremen's Association. Ricci went missing October 2005, and his body was found inside the trunk of a car outside a New Jersey diner the following month.

On March 9, 2007, Coppola was arrested after eleven years on the run as a fugitive. The FBI offered him a deal to become an informant in their case against Fiumara for Ricci's murder. Coppola refused to testify and was sentenced on December 18, 2009, to 16 years. On September 16, 2010, Fiumara died of natural causes.

=== New Jersey Commission report of May 2004 ===
According to the 2004, New Jersey organized crime report, the Genovese family maintained five crews headquartered in New Jersey, each overseen by a Capo and at least four New York-based crews with operations in New Jersey. The family had approximately 40 ranked soldiers and more than 400 criminal associates who were active in New Jersey. It was also reported that the family operated in the northern New Jersey counties of Hudson, Essex, Union, Bergen, and Passaic counties and in the earlier years gained strength in Middlesex, Monmouth and Ocean counties.

The crime report stated that the Genovese family controlled the largest bookmaking and loan sharking rings in the New York/New Jersey metropolitan area and the family maintained strong influence on the Port Newark/Elizabeth and Hudson County waterfronts. The report identified family consigliere Lawrence "Little Larry" Dentico as a person with extensive familiarity of the family's New Jersey operations, having served as the top aid to former consigliere and New Jersey operations chief Louis A. "Bobby" Manna. The 2004, New Jersey report identified the five Capos headquartered in New Jersey, who were Tino Fiumara (died in 2010), Angelo Prisco (died in 2017), Joseph Gatto (died in 2010), Silvio DeVita, and Ludwig Bruschi (died in 2020).

==== The Fiumara/Coppola crew ====
Tino "the Greek" Fiumara was the capo and the most powerful mobster in the New Jersey faction. He controlled unions from Newark-Elizabeth port and had been involved in loansharking, extortion, gambling, union and labor racketeering throughout New Jersey counties of Union, Essex and Bergen. During early 2005, Fiumara began using Stephen Depiro to help control and handle all of the illegal operations in the New Jersey piers and docks. On September 16, 2010, Fiumara died of natural causes. On March 21, 2020, longtime crew member Michael "Tona" Borelli died.

==== The Prisco/LaScala crew ====
Angelo "The Horn" Prisco was a capo from Yonkers, N.Y. who held influence in northern New Jersey. When John DiGilio was murdered Prisco took over much of the crew's operations in Hudson County's Bayonne and Jersey City waterfronts, while he also expanded operations into Monmouth County and Florida. Members of the Prisco crew were charged with shaking down International Longshoremen's Association (ILA) dockworkers at various Hudson County waterfront shipping terminals. In the early 1990s, he was ordered by Gigante to murder his cousin, Angelo Sangiuolo, after he was caught robbing from the family's gambling operations in the Bronx. In 1994, Prisco was charged with racketeering and DiGilio's murder. He pleaded guilty only to a 1998 arson charge and sentenced to 12 years in prison. While Prisco was in prison, Joseph LaScala supervised the crew. In 2002, Prisco was released from prison after his appeal was denied because the State Attorney General's office requested his early release. In 2008, Prisco was tried and convicted for the Sangiuolo murder and received life sentence. In May 2012, Joseph LaScala was arrested and charged with illegal gambling. On June 21, 2017, Angelo Prisco died in prison while serving a life sentence at the United States Penitentiary in Coleman, Florida. On February 3, 2019, LaScala died.

==== Gatto crew ====
This crew was led by capo Peter LaPlaca until the mid-1970s, until Louis "Streaky" Gatto took over the crew. Gatto became the boss of Bergen county with the help of his son Joseph "The Eagle" Gatto, and son in law and top enforcer Alan "Little Al" Grecco controlling a large illegal gambling, loansharking and bookmaking operations in Bergen and Passaic counties. The trio used murder, violence, and fear to collect on these rackets, ensuring rivals would not take advantage of their activities. In 1989, Louis Gatto Sr. and Alan Grecco were indicted on two murder counts for the murders of Arthur Belli and Vincent Mistretta they were also alleged to be behind the murders of Jack "Handsome Jack" Ciaramella, Johnny Lombardi, and Peter Adamo. In 1991, both Louis Gatto Sr. and Alan Grecco were sentenced 65 years, while Joseph Gatto was indicted on racketeering charges and received 30 months.

Joseph Gatto was released in 1993 and assumed control of his father's crew. He expanded the crew's gambling operations by introducing the use of pagers and cell phones. By 1999, he was convicted on illegal gambling charges and took a plea deal where he admitted that he was a capo with the Genovese family. Joseph Gatto was released in 2003, but he was indicted again in December 2004 for running Catalina Sports, an offshore wire room in Costa Rica. The sports bar allegedly grossed $300,000-$500,000 in profit per week. The conviction was overturned in 2005, but prosecutors tried again in 2008. Joseph Gatto died in April 2010 of natural causes, without being jailed.

==== The DeVita crew ====
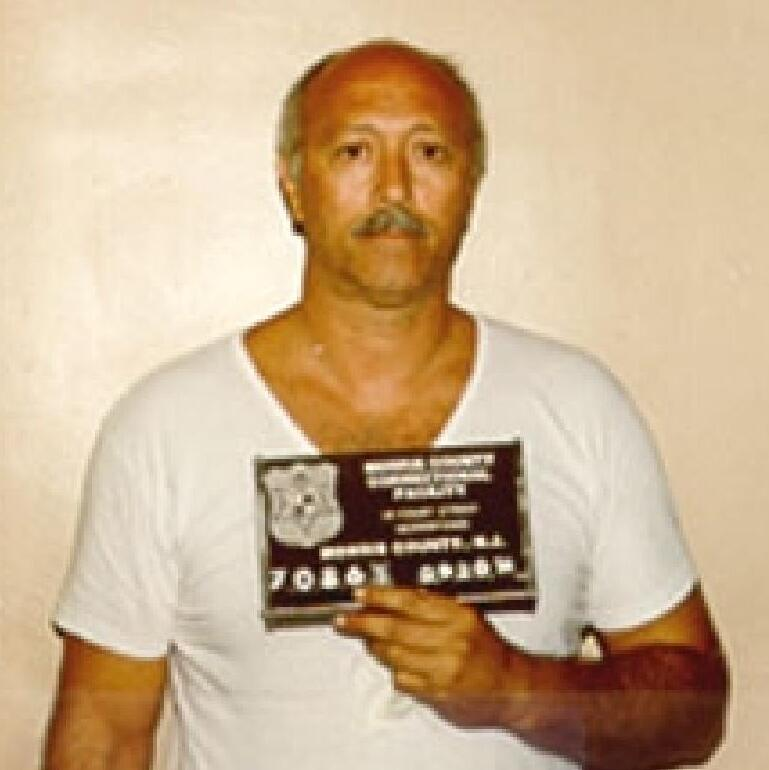
Mugshot of Silvio P. DeVita included with the notice of his exclusion by the New Jersey Division of Gaming Enforcement

After capo Andrew Gerardo retired in the 1990s, this crew was taken over by Sicilian-born Silvio P. DeVita. The crew operates mainly in Essex County, where DeVita runs illegal operations such as gambling, loansharking, insurance fraud, extorting construction sites and union racketeering. DeVita keeps strong family and criminal ties to Sicily. The crew may increase in size by recruiting more Sicilians ("zips") who share blood and marriage ties with him. DeVita was placed on the New Jersey State Casino Control Commission Exclusion List, which bars him from any casino in that state. In December 2004, New Jersey law enforcement identified Silvio DeVita as the capo controlling the Newark area for the Genovese family.

==== The Bruschi crew ====
Ludwig "Ninni" Bruschi was first identified by law enforcement as a bookmaker in the 1970s. He continued to operate gambling operations and, by the 1990s, had risen to the ranks of capo operating in both South and North Jersey. He rose to power with the New Jersey faction with the absence of Fiumara, who had been imprisoned. After Prisco was jailed from 1994 until 2002, Bruschi gained more power within the faction. In June 2003, he was indicted for running a racketeering enterprise engaged in illegal gambling, loansharking and drug distribution. Bruschi was paroled in April 2010 from New Jersey State prison. On April 19, 2020, Bruschi died.

=== Current position ===
In December 2004, Bergen County Prosecutor arrested dozens of mobsters including Joseph "The Eagle" Gatto for operating illegal sports betting with ties to offshore wire rooms in Costa Rica. The indictment identified Joseph "The Eagle" Gatto as a soldier in the Genovese family, who was in control of father Louis "Streaky" Gatto's old number rackets. According to the New Jersey authorities the Genovese crime family operates in New Jersey with three captains. Authorities identified the three captains who operated from Northern and Central Jersey as Angelo M. Prisco, Ludwig Bruschi and Silvio Devita. It was also stated by New Jersey authorities that the Genovese family was the most powerful and most active Mafia family in the State.

Since the 2004 report, the Genovese NJ faction has had numerous important members die, including Prisco crew capo Joseph LaScala, who died in 2019, as well as capo Ludwig Bruschi and acting capo Michael "Tona" Borelli, who both died in 2020.

In 2009, acting capo Anthony "Tony D." Palumbo was arrested charged with murder, racketeering in Brooklyn and New Jersey along with associate Felice Masullo and soldier Rocco Petrozza. The murder charge dated back to 1992, for the murder of Angelo Sangiuolo, an associate of the Genovese, information revealed that Palumbo complained to family boss Vincent Gigante about Sangiuolo and captain Angelo Prisco arranged the murder. In August 2010, Palumbo pled guilty to conspiracy murder charges and was sentenced on May 5, 2011, to 10 years in prison. In 2024, Palumbo was identified as a member of Genovese family boss Bellomo's inner circle and a powerful capo with operation in New Jersey and Staten Island with significant influence on the waterfront.

== Current members ==
=== Caporegimes ===
- Capo – Silvio P. DeVita – capo controlling the Newark area for the Genovese family. DeVita is Sicilian born mobster operating in Essex County. In 1951, DeVita was convicted of first-degree murder during and robbery, he received a death sentence, until his conviction was reversed on appeal. At DeVita's new trail in 1958, he was found guilty and sentenced to life in prison and released on parole in the 1970s. Members of DeVita's crew include soldiers Salvatore Cetrulo and Joseph Cetrulo who have many family relatives working in the New Jersey docks.
- Capo – Anthony "Tony D." Palumbo – capo operating from New Jersey and Staten Island with significant influence on the waterfront. As of 2024, Palumbo is a member of family boss Bellomo's inner circle. Palumbo's uncle is retired Genovese family capo Andrew Gerardo. In December 1992, capo Jimmy "Nap" Napoli died, and Palumbo became the acting capo of Napoli's Brooklyn based crew which controlled a large numbers and sports bookmaking operation. The crew included soldier James Tenaglia, who operated a highly profitable loansharking, gambling, and numbers business in Brooklyn, and associate Felice Masullo, who was one of Tenaglia right-hand men. Palumbo also replaced Napoli's position for the Genovese family in taxing and extorting millions of dollars from Russian mobsters in Brooklyn who were participating in an illegal gasoline scam. In 2009, Palumbo was indicted and identified as an acting capo operating crews in Brooklyn and New Jersey. He was arrested and charged with racketeering and murder along with his driver an associate Felice Masullo, soldier Rocco Petrozza, and others. The murder charge dated back to 1992, for the homicide of Angelo Sangiuolo, an associate of the Genovese, it was proven in the trail that Palumbo had complained to family boss Vincent Gigante about Sangiuolo and it was decided that captain Angelo Prisco would arrange Sangiuolo's murder. In August 2010, Palumbo pled guilty to conspiracy murder charges. On May 5, 2011, Palumbo was sentenced to the maximum 10 years in federal prison. Palumbo was released on September 13, 2019, from prison. In 2024, Palumbo was identified as a member of family boss Bellomo's inner circle and a powerful capo with operation in New Jersey and Staten Island with significant influence on the waterfront.
- Capo – Stephen "Beach" Depiro – capo of the "Fiumara crew" controlling illegal operations from the New Jersey Newark/Elizabeth Seaport. In 2005, Depiro began leading the crew with Tino Fiumara controlling illegal operations in the New Jersey piers and docks. During 2010, Depiro was overseeing the illegal operations in the New Jersey Newark/Elizabeth Seaport before Fiumara's death. In 2017, Depiro was identified a soldier in the Genovese family during the investigation of Mark Caruso, Jr.'s ALJ waterfront application.

=== Soldiers ===
- Michael "Mikey Cigars" Coppola – during the 1980s served as acting capo for Tino Fiumara. In 2009, he was imprisoned and sentenced to 16 years. He was released from federal custody on October 20, 2022.
- Michael Crincoli – soldier; released from prison on July 12, 2010
- Lawrence "Little Larry" Dentico – soldier and former consigliere; released from prison on May 12, 2009
- Ralph Esposito – reputed member of family; soldier; was a shop steward for the International Longshoreman's Association Local 1588. He was indicted in 2003 on charges related to union corruption at several waterfront shipping terminals in New Jersey.
- Peter "Lodi Pete" Leconte – reputed member of the family's NJ faction. In 2013, Leconte pleaded guilty to conspiring to commit racketeering and extortion in a bid to control the waste-hauling industry in NJ and NYC.
- Louis "Bobby" Manna – former consigliere 1981–1989; imprisoned received a life sentence in 1990.

== Past members ==
- Guarino "Willie" Moretti – former underboss in the family 1937–1951, murdered in 1951
- Gerardo "Jerry" Catena former underboss in the family underboss 1957–72; imprisoned 1969–1976, retired and died in 2000
- Anthony "Tony Pro" Provenzano – imprisoned 1978
- Tino R. "the Greek" Fiumara – capo, imprisoned 1999-2003 died in 2010
- Michael A. "Tona" Borelli - was a New Jersey mobster and former acting co-capo of Tino Fiumara's crew, along with Lawrence Ricci. Borelli controlled construction and illegal gambling rackets in NJ, and formerly oversaw the Teamster's Union. On March 21, 2020, Borelli died.
- Ludwig "Ninni" Bruschi – former capo died April 2020
- Ruggiero "Richie the Boot" Boiardo – capo from the 1920s until his death in 1984
- John "Johnny D." DiGilio – capo from the 1970s up until his murder in 1988
- Louis "Streaky" Gatto – capo from the 1970s, he was imprisoned in 1989 and received a 65-year sentence; died in 2002
- Joseph "The Eagle" Gatto – capo 1990s, until he died April 2010; he was the son of Louis Gatto
- Andrew N. Gerardo – capo from the early 1980s up until his retirement to Florida in the 1990s
- Peter LaPlaca – capos from the 1950s, until he retired in the mid-1970s
- Lawrence A. Ricci – a former acting capo. In 1979, Ricci and Tino Fiumara were convicted of trying to extort a Parsippany, New Jersey, restaurant owner. In February 2005, Ricci was charged with extorting thousands of dollars from the International Longshoremen's Association. On October 7, 2005, Ricci failed to show up in court. On November 7, 2005, the absent Ricci his two co-defendants were acquitted on all counts. On November 30, 2005, the police discovered Ricci's body; he had been shot twice in the back and left in the trunk of a car parked in Union, New Jersey.
- Anthony "Little Pussy" Russo – murdered on April 26, 1979
- Angelo "The Horn" Prisco – former faction boss and caporegime. Prisco controlled operations in Hudson County waterfronts cities of Bayonne and Jersey City; Monmouth County and Florida. On August 18, 2009, Prisco was sentenced to life and was imprisoned in Florida. He died in 2017.
- Joseph Michael Doto Jr. – born March 25, 1933, known as "Joe Adonis Jr." was a soldier in Genovese family and the son of mobster Joe Adonis. Doto Jr. went on to control illegal gambling, loansharking and hijacking activities in Bergen County, New Jersey. In 1975, Doto Jr. was charged with bribery after Gambino family soldier Anthony Carminati was arrested. Doto Jr. worked alongside a New Jersey subgroup led by Tino Fiumara, Michael Borelli and Michael Coppola.
