= United States Senate Special Committee to Investigate Crime in Interstate Commerce =

1950–1951 inquiry

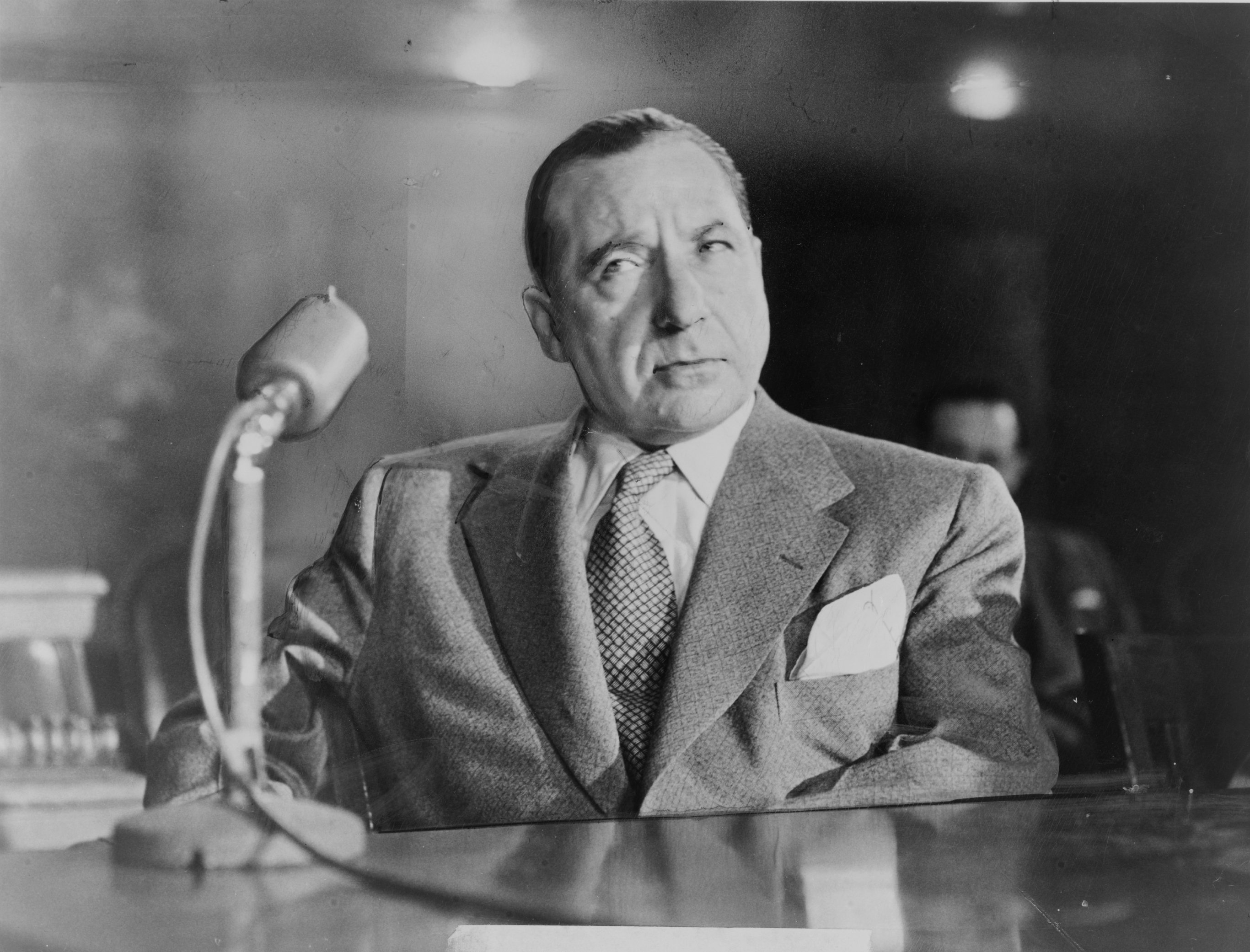
Mobster Frank Costello testifying before the Kefauver Committee.

The United States Senate Special Committee to Investigate Crime in Interstate Commerce was a special committee of the United States Senate which existed from 1950 to 1951 and investigated organized crime which crossed state borders in the United States. The committee became popularly known as the Kefauver Committee because of its chairman, Senator Estes Kefauver. The televised hearing helped Kefauver become a household name; he subsequently launched an unsuccessful bid for the presidency in 1952, and became the Democratic vice presidential nominee in 1956. The term capo di tutti capi was introduced to the U.S. public by the Kefauver Commission.

== Genesis of the committee ==
Organized crime was the subject of a large number of widely read articles in several major newspapers and magazines in 1949. Several local "crime commissions" in major cities and states had also uncovered extensive corruption of the political process by organized crime. Many cities and states called for federal help in dealing with organized crime, yet federal law provided few tools for the U.S. government to do so. In particular, many cities and states were concerned with the way organized crime had infiltrated interstate commerce, and how it threatened to hold the American economy hostage through labor racketeering.

On January 5, 1950, Senator Estes Kefauver (D-Tennessee) introduced a resolution that would allow the Senate Committee on the Judiciary to investigate organized crime's role in interstate commerce. However, the Senate Committee on Interstate and Foreign Commerce already claimed jurisdiction over the issue. A compromise resolution was substituted which established a special committee of five Senators, whose membership would be drawn from both the Judiciary and Commerce committees. Debate over the substitute resolution was bitter and partisan, and the voting on the resolution extremely close. On May 3, 1950, Vice President Alben W. Barkley, sitting in his role as President of the United States Senate, cast the tie-breaking vote, and the Special Committee to Investigate Crime in Interstate Commerce was established.

== Committee work and history ==
Barkley, as President of the Senate, was empowered to choose the committee's members. They included: Kefauver; Herbert O'Conor (Maryland), Lester C. Hunt (Wyoming), Alexander Wiley (Wisconsin), and Charles W. Tobey (New Hampshire).

The Kefauver Committee held hearings in 14 major cities across the United States. More than 600 witnesses testified. Many of the committee's hearings were televised live on national television to large audiences, providing many Americans with their first glimpse of organized crime's influence in the U.S. Among the more notorious figures who appeared before the committee were Tony "Joe Batters" Accardo, Louis "Little New York" Campagna, Mickey Cohen, Willie Moretti, Frank Costello, Jake "Greasy Thumb" Guzik, Meyer Lansky, Paul "The Waiter" Ricca, Virginia Hill (former Joe Adonis–Chicago Outfit messenger and mobster Bugsy Siegel's girlfriend), and four of Irish mob boss Enoch "Nucky" Johnson's former policemen in Atlantic City were also called forth.

The committee also investigated Frank Sinatra. At Kefauver's request associate counsel Joseph L. Nellis interviewed him. At 4 AM on 1 March 1951, Nellis met Sinatra in an office at the top of the Rockefeller Center. Kefauver had come into possession of eight photographs of Sinatra with well-known mafia figures. One was of Sinatra with his arm around Lucky Luciano on the balcony of the Hotel Nacional in Cuba, another was of Sinatra seated with Luciano at a night club. He also appeared with the Fischetti brothers in a number of other pictures. Kefauver wanted to determine whether Sinatra should be called to testify before the committee, so he tasked Nellis with setting up an interview. Nellis contacted Sinatra's attorney Sol Gelb, through him the meeting was arranged.

Nellis quizzed Sinatra on his mafia connections. He admitted "knowing" or "seeing", and saying "hello" or "goodbye", to Lucky Luciano, the Fischetti brothers, Al Capone's cousins, Meyer Lansky, Frank Costello, Joe Adonis, Abner Zwillman, Willie Moretti, Gerardo Catena, and Bugsy Siegel. In one photograph Sinatra was seen with an attaché case departing a plane. Sinatra told Nellis that it contained razors and crayons. When Nellis suggested that there was over $100,000 in the case, Sinatra denied it, insisting that he gave no money to Luciano and that he did not know what line of business Luciano was in. He denied having any business dealings with any of the aforementioned men. At the end of the two hour meeting Nellis learnt nothing which would have enabled him to subpoena Sinatra before the official congressional hearings.

Kefauver became a nationally recognized figure, and the committee enabled him to run for President of the United States in 1952 and 1956 (his runs failed, but he became his party's vice presidential nominee in 1956). Many of the Kefauver Committee's hearings were aimed at proving that a Sicilian-Italian organization based on strong family ties centrally controlled a vast organized crime conspiracy in the United States, but the committee never came close to justifying such a claim. Rather, the committee uncovered extensive evidence that people of all nationalities, ethnicities, and religions operated locally controlled, loosely organized crime syndicates at the local level. The committee's final report, issued on April 17, 1951, included 22 recommendations for the federal government and seven recommendations for state and local authorities. Among its recommendations were: The creation of a "racket squad" within the United States Department of Justice; the establishment of a permanent Crime Commission at the federal level; the expansion of the jurisdiction of the Judiciary Committee to include interstate organized crime; federal studies into the sociology of crime; a ban on betting via radio, television, telegraph, and telephone; the establishment of state and local crime commissions; and a request that the Justice Department investigate and prosecute 33 named individuals as suspected leaders of organized crime in the United States.

The committee's work led to several significant outcomes. Among the most notable was an admission by J. Edgar Hoover, Director of the Federal Bureau of Investigation, that a national organized crime syndicate did exist and that the FBI had done little about it. Legislative proposals and state ballot referendums legalizing gambling went down to defeat over the next few years due to revelations of organized crime's involvement in the gambling industry, and more than 70 "crime commissions" were established at the state and local level to build on the Kefauver Committee's work. The Kefauver Committee was the first to suggest that civil law be expanded and used to combat organized crime. Congress responded to the call, and in 1970 passed the Racketeer Influenced and Corrupt Organizations Act as a direct response to the committee's recommendation.

== Leadership ==
Senator Kefauver served as the committee's first chair. Kefauver relinquished the committee chair on April 30, 1951, and Senator O'Conor assumed the chairmanship until the committee folded on September 1, 1951.

== In public culture ==
The television broadcast of the committee's hearings attracted huge public interest and educated a broad audience about the issues of municipal corruption and organized crime. An estimated 30 million people in the United States tuned in to watch the live proceedings in March 1951 and at the time 72 percent of the population were familiar with the committee's work. The tremendous success of the broadcast led to the production of a cycle of "exposé" crime films dealing with the dismantling of complex criminal organizations by law enforcement. The first one of these was The Captive City (1952), which had the blessing of senator Kefauver himself: Director Robert Wise took a print of the film to D.C. to show the senator, who not only endorsed it but even appears in the prologue and epilogue, cautioning audiences about the evils of organized crime. Other notable examples of exposé films inspired by the hearings include Hoodlum Empire (1952) and The Turning Point (1952). The committee report was an inspiration for the 1956 James Bond novel Diamonds are Forever.

A fictionalized version of the Senate hearings is a central plot device in the 1974 film The Godfather Part II, featuring testimony by Michael Corleone, now the head of his eponymous crime family, and disgruntled Family caporegime Frank Pentangeli. Another version of the Senate hearings is portrayed in the 2025 Warner Bros. HBO Max streaming film The Alto Knights, starring Robert De Niro in a dual role as both Vito Genovese and Frank Costello.

== Bibliography ==
- Batista, Paul A. Civil RICO Practice Manual. Frederick, Md.: Aspen Publishers, 2008.
- Beare, Margaret E. Critical Reflections on Transnational Organized Crime, Money Laundering, and Corruption. Toronto: University of Toronto Press, 2003.
- Fontenay, Charles. Estes Kefauver: A Biography. Paperback ed. Knoxville, Tenn.: University of Tennessee Press, 1991.
- Friedman, John S. The Secret Histories: Hidden Truths That Challenged the Past and Changed the World. New York: Picador, 2005.
- Hughes, Howard. Crime Wave: The Filmgoers' Guide to the Great Crime Movies. London: Palgrave Macmillan, 2006.
- Kaiser, David E. The Road to Dallas: The Assassination of John F. Kennedy. Cambridge, Massachusetts: Harvard University Press, 2008.
- Kefauver, Estes (1951). Crime in America. Doubleday.
- Larke-Walsh, George S. (2010). Screening the Mafia: Masculinity, Ethnicity and Mobsters From 'The Godfather' to 'The Sopranos'. Jefferson, N.C.: McFarland & Co. ISBN 9780786456130.
- Larson, Calvin J. and Garrett, Gerald R. Crime, Justice and Society. Walnut Creek, Calif.: Alta Mira, 2003.
- Moore, William Howard (1974). The Kefauver Committee and the Politics of Crime, 1950-1952. University of Missouri Press. ISBN 9780826201454.
- Shanty, Frank. Organized Crime: From Trafficking to Terrorism. Santa Barbara, Calif." ABC-CLIO, 2008.
- Thompson, William Norman. Gambling in America: An Encyclopedia of History, Issues, and Society. Santa Barbara, Calif.: ABC-CLIO, 2001.
