= Richard DeSciscio =

Richard “Bocci” DeSciscio was an enforcer for the Genovese crime family who was imprisoned for the 1977 murder of Frank Bok Chung Chin.

== Legal issues ==
Along with Louis “Bobby” Manna, he was convicted of the murder of Irwin “The Fat Man” Schiff.

In 2022, Manna, then 92 and DeSciscio, then 80, filed the paperwork for compassionate early release under Donald Trump's First Step Act. Manna and DeSciscio had been sentenced to 80 and 75 years respectively by Judge Maryanne Trump Barry.

They also appealed their convictions on the grounds of prosecutorial misconduct.
