= Mikey Coppola =

American mobster (born 1946)

Michael J. Coppola
- Born: May 18, 1946 (age 80); Newark, New Jersey, U.S.
- Other names: Mikey Cigars, Little Mike
- Known for: Mob activity
- Spouse: Linda
- Relatives: Michael Coppola Jr. (son); Vincent Coppola Louis James Rizzo Jr. (stepson); Lawrence Coppola (nephew); Peter Coppola (nephew)

Michael J. Coppola (born May 18, 1946), also known as "Mikey Cigars", is an American mobster and captain in the Genovese crime family active in their New Jersey faction. He made national headlines when he went into hiding for 11 years to avoid a possible murder conviction. He should not be confused with Michael "Trigger Mike" Coppola (1900–1966), also a member of the Genovese family.

== Early criminal career ==
Michael Coppola has been working for the Genovese family since the 1960s. He became a made man in the late 1970s and was part of a Genovese hit team known as "The Fist", according to government documents. This team performed murders ordered by the Genovese administration in the late 1970s and 1980s. Coppola was involved in labor racketeering in the trucking industry and New Jersey docks. Coppola served almost five years in prison from 1979 to 1983 for conspiracy and extortion. Coppola became an acting caporegime (captain) while Tino Fiumara was in prison in the 1980s and 1990s, running the day-to-day activities of the New Jersey faction Fiurama had orders relayed to him.

=== Alleged murder ===
In 1996, Coppola was charged in the 1977 killing of John "Johnny Cokes" Lardiere. According to authorities, Lardiere was released for 26 hours from prison to spend the Easter holidays with his family. The reason for his sanctioned killing are not fully known, but is speculated that he had turned against the mob and was going to give the FBI information on the mob's influence on garbage hauling. Another story has it that Lardiere entered into a heated argument with Ralph "Blackie" Napoli, a caporegime in the Philadelphia crime family and his death was ordered. When Lardiere got out of his car at a Bridgewater, New Jersey motel, the killer was standing in front of him with a .22 automatic pistol, complete with a silencer. When the gunman squeezed the trigger, the gun jammed. Lardiere was both amused and annoyed by the man and allegedly said "What're you gonna do now, tough guy?". The gunman responded by pulling up his pant leg, and removing a .38 revolver from an ankle holster and shooting Lardiere four times. When police arrived at the crime scene, realizing it was a mob hit, they found the shooter had left behind his weapons and a hat. In 1996, Lucchese crime family mobster Thomas "Tommy" Ricciardi who had been arrested on murder and extortion charges, decided to cooperate with authorities. He told the FBI that Lardiere's killer was Coppola. Ricciardi told police that he heard the entire story of Lardiere's murder from Coppola while talking about mob murders with Michael Taccetta at a party in 1983.

== Fugitive and arrest ==
A gun and hat were left at the murder scene. Since the advancement of forensics since 1977, a judge ordered Coppola to submit a DNA test. When the FBI requested a DNA sample on August 8, 1996 which could have proved he was at the murder scene, Coppola fled his Spring Lake, New Jersey home with his wife. He spent most of his time moving between apartments in San Francisco and New York City. During his time on the run, he was featured on America's Most Wanted. Although on the run, authorities believed he was still holding power over organized crime in New Jersey as a fugitive. A fellow New Jersey mobster for the Genovese family and a Furmara/Coppola associate, was charged by the FBI with illegally harboring Coppola during the months before he was caught and arrested. In April 2002, the U.S. Attorney's Office for the District of New Jersey obtained an indictment against Fiumara for conspiring to assist Coppola in Coppola's flight. In March 2003, he pleaded guilty to conspiring to conceal and failing to report that he had been in contact with Coppola. In November, a federal judge ordered Fiumara back to prison for eight months for concealing Coppola's whereabouts.

While on the run, investigators were searching for him in Nevada, Pennsylvania, Florida, Canada, Italy, and Costa Rica. On March 9, 2007, after 11 years on the run Coppola and his wife Linda were found and arrested. While conducting a search of their Upper West Side home they found a book entitled "The Methods of Attacking Scientific Evidence". Coppola pleaded guilty to fugitive charges and was given a 42-month (3 and a half years) sentence. His wife Linda also pleaded guilty to harboring a fugitive and received probation. Louis James Rizzo Jr., Coppola's step-son, was also convicted for conspiracy to harbor a fugitive and sentenced to 3 years in prison. Rizzo was released on November 10, 2009.

== Trial ==
In 2009, the FBI believed that Coppola was going to turn state's evidence against the Genovese family and cooperate with the FBI. The FBI was willing to give him immunity from prosecution and enter him in the Witness Protection Program if he cooperated. The FBI believed he was involved in the killing of Lawrence Ricci (along with his son and stepson) on orders of Tino Fiumara, one of the men the FBI was hoping to prosecute with Coppola's cooperation. Coppola waived a speedy arraignment and spent the next two nights sleeping at FBI headquarters in lower Manhattan at an undisclosed hotel. He also met with a government arranged lawyer known as a shadow counsel. On the third day, however, Coppola refused to cooperate. His defense lawyer Henry Mazurek said that Coppola only dragged out the process out of concern for his wife, who he feared would also be arrested and charged.

In July 2009, Coppola was put on trial for murder, racketeering and extorting the Local 1235 of the International Longshoremen's Association for over 30 years. If found guilty of all counts, he could have faced life imprisonment. Defense lawyer Henry Mazurek told jurors that Coppola admitted to making a "rash" decision to flee, but that it didn't prove he's a killer. "He didn't want to stand trial for a murder he didn't commit," Mazurek said. Assistant U.S. Attorney Jack Dennehy told the jury not to be fooled by Coppola's claims and that Coppola "ran because he didn't want to face a jury like you. He hid because he didn't want to face a jury like you." Thomas Riccardi testified that Coppola said he did not agree with the Lardiere murder, but that he followed the orders given to him by Tino Fiumara (who was never charged). Genovese family member turned government witness George Barone was also called to aid the prosecution. Barone was such a difficult witness that the prosecutor apparently decided not to ask him about the Lardiere murder.

A witness to the murder, Raymond Zychlinski, was called on as a defense witness in the case. Zychlinski refuted the prosecutor's story that Lardiere's killer taunted him and said all he heard was a "horrifying scream". On July 21, 2009, Coppola was acquitted of the murder, partially due to the DNA test proving inconclusive since it matched 11 million white men in America. However, he was found guilty of violating the RICO Act for extortion and possessing false identification while he was a fugitive, which could have imprisoned him for up to 20 years. Coppola nodded and mouthed the words, "It's O.K.," to his wife after the verdict.

Coppola was then taken into custody already serving time for his original fugitive sentence in the Metropolitan Detention Center, Brooklyn. On December 18, 2009 Judge John Gleeson sentenced Coppola to 16 years in prison. He served most of his time at the United States Penitentiary, Atlanta before being sent to Residential Reentry Management in Brooklyn in 2021. He was released from federal custody on October 20, 2022.

== Notes ==
known nephew, Nicholas Sarro aka spanky. The factions leading hitman who was never convicted but is legendary for being interrogated for 71 hours and not breaking.
