= Willie Moretti =

Italian-American mobster (1894–1951)

Guarino Moretti
- Born: February 24, 1894; Bari, Apulia, Kingdom of Italy
- Died: October 4, 1951 (aged 57); Cliffside Park, New Jersey, U.S.
- Cause of death: Gunshots
- Other name: "Willie Moore"
- Occupations: Mobster, businessman
- Known for: Frank Costello's right-hand man
- Allegiance: Genovese crime family
- Criminal charge: Robbery
- Penalty: 1 year in prison

Guarino "Willie" Moretti (February 24, 1894 – October 4, 1951), also known as Willie Moore, was an Italian-American mobster who served as underboss of the Luciano crime family, later known as the Genovese crime family, and a top member of its New Jersey faction under Frank Costello. He was murdered in 1951 after his testimony before the Kefauver Committee made his organized crime colleagues anxious that he would reveal the details of their criminal activities to law enforcement or the press.

== Criminal career ==
Born Guarino Moretti in Bari, Apulia, in southern Italy, Moretti emigrated to the United States with his family as a child. He grew up in East Harlem, a neighbor of Frank Costello. As a young man he boxed as a featherweight under the name "Willie Moore," a nickname that stuck with him for the rest of his life.

On January 12, 1913, after being convicted of robbery, Moretti was sentenced to one year in state prison in Elmira, New York. He was released after several months.

After his release from prison he organized dice games in his neighborhood in East Harlem and acquired a reputation for toughness. He forged a bond with his neighbor Frank Costello, who was part of the Morello gang.

With the advent of Prohibition Moretti was active as a rumrunner, both in and around New York City and in the Buffalo, New York area, where he worked closely with Stefano Magaddino, boss of the Buffalo crime family. Moretti later went to work for Waxey Gordon, one of the leading bootleggers in the New York and New Jersey area, and took over Gordon's North Jersey rackets in 1933 when Gordon was sent to prison.

Moretti moved to Hasbrouck Heights, New Jersey, located in Bergen County, New Jersey just outside New York City, around 1930. Moretti began building his own gambling network and rum-running business in Bergen and Passaic counties. Moretti established his headquarters in Cliffside Park at the Marine Room, a casino within the Riviera Club, a popular nightclub on the Palisades north of the George Washington Bridge. He later acquired a home in the upscale community of Deal, located in Monmouth County, New Jersey along the Jersey Shore.

From 1933 to 1951, Moretti, in association with Joe Adonis, Settimo Accardi and Abner Zwillman, ran lucrative gambling dens in New Jersey and upstate New York. These ranged from "sawdust joints," where only men were allowed to gamble, to "carpet joints" that admitted women and catered to a higher class of clientele, for whom Moretti provided limousine service from Manhattan. These casinos also attracted local businessmen and judges, who often left with debts that Moretti and Adonis were able to exploit to their advantage.

A newspaper account of the time described his string of gambling locations as "probably the biggest and most lucrative empire in the U.S." In addition to his earnings from the gambling operations his crew ran, Moretti also derived income from numbers rackets and bookmaking operations in Bergen County, who paid him a percentage of their profits for protection from the authorities.

Maintaining this empire required substantial payoffs to police, politicians, and judges "on the pad," mob slang for graft. Newspaper accounts of the time estimated that Moretti paid out $200,000 a month in bribes. In Moretti's view, however, he was not guilty of corrupting honest officials; as he told his attorney

Clear your mind about us trying to corrupt public officials. We are fighting them off all the time to prevent them asking for more.

In addition to buying political support (and protection from prosecution) through bribery, Moretti also won broader public support through private acts of generosity. Moretti often sent hundreds of dollars anonymously to families facing eviction; Moretti himself estimated that he had given needy friends more than a million dollars in uncollectable "touches." His philanthropy reaped rewards: when Willie Moretti's brother Salvatore was indicted for operating unlawful casinos in Lodi, New Jersey, the court could not find twelve potential jurors out of 300 citizens who were questioned who would swear they were not prejudiced in favor of the Moretti family. After his death the Record newspaper based in Hackensack eulogized him by stating "Whatever his business was, he was a family man and nothing made him happier than giving those he loved the best."

Moretti also owned interests in some ostensibly legitimate businesses, such as U.S. Linen Supply Co., Inc., which supplied hotels, restaurants and bars with uniforms, towels, and linens. With members of Moretti's crew acting as salesmen, the laundry soon was handling the linen for most of the restaurants and bars in northern New Jersey. Moretti sold that business, which he had bought for $3,000 in 1936, for more than a million dollars in cash in 1951.

He was also reputed to be the "banker" for prostitution and drug trafficking in New Jersey. Moretti had, in fact, tried to establish a prostitution ring in the First Ward of Newark, but was prevented from doing so by Richie "the Boot" Boiardo, who considered the First Ward to be his domain. As for drug dealing, the Federal Bureau of Narcotics considered Moretti to be a major drug trafficker, describing him in a 1941 record as "Overlord and financier of rackets, including narcotics, within his bailiwick" and listing "every member of the Italian mob in Northern New Jersey" among his associates. There is no record, however, that Moretti or any members of his crew were ever charged with commission of any drug-related crimes. To the extent that Moretti engaged in or financed either prostitution or drug trafficking, they were secondary to his most lucrative business, gambling.

Moretti was, for most of his life, a trusted lieutenant of Frank Costello, with whom he had been friends since their boyhood days in East Harlem; Costello was also best man at Moretti's wedding. Moretti provided Costello with muscle when necessary while Costello cultivated an image of being a legitimate businessman and gambler.

When Costello was acting boss of the Luciano crime family he made Moretti underboss. Moretti was high up enough in the ranks of organized crime to have attended the Havana Conference in 1946. By 1950, however, his stature had declined as he faced financial problems, doubts about his mental health, and competition from rivals for his gambling business.

== Show business connections ==
Moretti was an early sponsor of then-unknown singer Frank Sinatra, but not his godfather in the conventional sense. Sinatra's first wife, Nancy Barbato, was a paternal cousin of John Barbato, a Moretti associate. Moretti helped Sinatra get bookings in New Jersey clubs and arranged for an audition that helped him land a job singing at the Riviera, which he controlled. That gig brought Sinatra even greater exposure and led to a job with Harry James' orchestra.

In 1939, Sinatra signed a three-year contract with band leader Tommy Dorsey. By the early 1940s, Sinatra had achieved national popularity and wanted to move on to a solo career. In order to be released early from his contract with Dorsey he entered into a new agreement that required Sinatra to turn over 43 percent of all future earnings to Dorsey and Dorsey's agent. Sinatra soon realised just how bad a deal he had made and, with assistance from Jules Stein of MCA Inc., unsuccessfully tried to buy his way out of it.

A rumour that Sinatra asked Moretti for help, and that Moretti jammed a gun barrel down Dorsey's throat and threatened to kill him if he did not release Sinatra, soon circulated. According to this account, Dorsey released Sinatra from his contract for one dollar.

Sinatra denied throughout his career that either Moretti or anyone else had threatened Dorsey with violence to cancel that contract and once assaulted a newspaper columnist for writing about his connections to Moretti. On the other hand, both Moretti and Dorsey indicated that the story was broadly true, without confirming all the details.

In the late 1940s, Moretti became acquainted with entertainers Dean Martin and Jerry Lewis while they were performing at Bill Miller's Riviera nightclub in Fort Lee, New Jersey. In earlier years, Moretti and Abner "Longy" Zwillman were watching the club's cardroom when it was previously owned by Ben Marden. In 1947, Martin, Lewis, Sinatra, and comedian Milton Berle all performed at the wedding reception of one of Moretti's daughters.

== Testimony before the Kefauver Committee ==
In 1950, the United States Senate Special Committee to Investigate Crime in Interstate Commerce started an investigation known as the "Kefauver hearings," named after its chairman, Sen. Estes Kefauver. Along with other members of the Genovese family, Moretti, by then widely known by his alias "Willie Moore", was called to testify.

Moretti was the only one who cooperated with the committee. While the other mobsters refused to testify by repeatedly invoking the Fifth Amendment to the United States Constitution, which provides legal protection against self-incrimination, the garrulous Moretti told jokes, spoke candidly, and generally played it up for the cameras. For example, when asked how long he'd been in the Mafia he replied, "What do you mean, like do I carry a membership card that says 'Mafia' on it?" And when asked how he operated politically he said, "I don't operate politically, if I did I'd be a congressman." The Senators and spectators in the room often broke out laughing at his sarcastic responses.

Moretti's organized crime colleagues, on the other hand, were not amused. Moretti had, in fact, been showing signs of instability for years before his appearance before the Kefauver Committee; his friend and boss, Frank Costello, sent Moretti to California in 1943 to seek a cure for his medical condition, with a male nurse serving as a bodyguard to keep him out of trouble. But when Moretti returned he began exhibiting the same odd behavior, which Vito Genovese and others alleged was due to advanced-stage syphilis.

Moretti's performance before the Kefauver Committee made all of those concerns even more salient. Moretti did not help his case by speaking regularly to the press after he appeared before Congress, giving his opinions about the state of the world and how to curb the growing power of the mob. Members of the Commission feared that Moretti might start sharing more damaging information about the internal workings of the Mafia and particular crimes by them.

As it turned out those fears were not unfounded: around the time Moretti was joking with and deflecting questions from the Senate Subcommittee and the press he was also was alleged to have been speaking with an agent of the Federal Bureau of Narcotics. Someone in the Los Angeles crime family appears to have caught wind of this: fifteen years after Moretti's assassination an informant described to an FBI agent how he had deduced in 1951 that Moretti had become an informant. He claimed he had reported his suspicions at a meeting of Mafiosi from Los Angeles and elsewhere, who decided to pass this information on to Joseph Zerilli of the Detroit crime family. According to this informant, Zerilli allegedly informed Tommy Lucchese, a member of the Commission, who undertook an investigation that confirmed his suspicions.

These heightened concerns about Moretti came at an opportune time for Vito Genovese. Costello had made Moretti the underboss of the Luciano crime family after Lucky Luciano was imprisoned and Genovese had fled to Italy. Genovese had never accepted his demotion to capo of a crew operating in Greenwich Village, rather than reinstatement as underboss or acting boss, upon his return from Italy in 1945. Genovese directed his anger chiefly at Moretti, who he thought stood in his way, and started talking as early as 1949 about the need to eliminate Moretti, according to Joe Valachi, one of Genovese's soldiers. Genovese also was covetous of Moretti's gambling rackets, which he hoped to seize once Moretti was eliminated, and positioned his lieutenant Jerry Catena to be prepared to take over on Moretti's death.

Costello relied on his long-time friend Moretti, with his "army" in New Jersey, as a bulwark against Genovese's ambitions. Costello's close relationship with Moretti had recently become strained, however, over Costello's vote to recognize Albert Anastasia as boss of the Mangano crime family after the disappearance of Vincent Mangano and the murder of his brother Philip. Costello, looking for allies against Genovese, accepted Anastasia's claim that the Mangano brothers planned to murder him; Moretti rejected it.

Moretti apparently was also deeply in debt, which forced him to put his Hasbrouck Heights house up for sale, cash in a life insurance policy, and sell his linen service company. His control of gambling in Northern New Jersey was weakened when his brother Salvatore and his ally Joe Adonis were sent to prison for running illegal gambling operations.

== Death ==
On the morning of October 4, 1951, Anastasia called Moretti to tell him that he had back troubles, and needed to go to the hospital for x-rays, but his chauffeur was not available. Anastasia asked whether he could use Moretti's chauffeur and bodyguard to take him to the hospital; Moretti agreed.

While Anastasia was at St. Mary's Hospital, Moretti was lunching with four other men at Joe's Elbow Room Restaurant in Cliffside Park, New Jersey. The waitress remembered the men, the only patrons in the restaurant, joking together in Italian before she went into the kitchen. At 11:28 am, the restaurant staff heard shots fired and ran into the dining room. Moretti was lying dead on his back on the floor with bullet wounds to the face and head. The gunmen had already fled the restaurant.

The waitress was able to tentatively identify the man who brought him to the restaurant as Anastasia Crime Family capo John "Johnny Roberts" Robilotto. The shooters are suspected to have been Philadelphia mobster Antonio Caponigro and Joseph "Pepe" LiCalsi. No one was prosecuted for Moretti's killing.

Twelve years later, government witness Joe Valachi described a conversation he had with Genovese about the Moretti murder:

It was supposedly a mercy killing because he was sick. Genovese told me, "The Lord have mercy on his soul, he's losing his mind."

Moretti's funeral service was conducted at Corpus Christi Church in Hasbrouck Heights and his burial at St. Michael's Cemetery in South Hackensack, New Jersey. Over 5,000 mourners attended the event, resulting in a circus-like atmosphere that required police intervention to clear away the crowds to permit the casket to be brought into the family mausoleum. Frank Costello, receiving medical treatment in Hot Springs, Arkansas, did not attend; nor did Albert Anastasia, who was being X-rayed in a hospital fifteen miles away at the time of the slaying.

== Personal life ==
Moretti married Angelina Morena in 1927; Frank Costello was his best man. He and his wife Angelina had three daughters and a son: Marie T. Moretti Palmeri (married to the son of Paul Palmeri of the Buffalo crime family), Rose Rita Moretti LaPlaca (married to the son of Pete LaPlaca of the Genovese crime family's Jersey crew), Angelina Moretti, and Michael Moretti. He was survived by his brother Salvatore and his sisters Rose Gentile and Kitty Grippo.

Moretti oversaw his businesses out of his homes in Hasbrouck Heights and Deal, located in Monmouth County, New Jersey along the Jersey Shore. He had sold his Hasbrouck Heights for cash shortly before his murder.

== In popular culture ==
- In A Man of Honor: The Autobiography of Joseph Bonanno, Simon & Schuster, ISBN 0-671-46747-6, Joseph Bonanno referred to Willie Moretti as Frank Costello's "strength." This would later be compared to the relationship between Mario Puzo's character Luca Brasi and Don Vito Corleone's so-called "strength" in the novel The Godfather.
- In The Sopranos episode "D-Girl", Christopher Moltisanti tells Jon Favreau the story of Moretti intimidating Tommy Dorsey, which Favreau cites as the inspiration for the Corleone family's efforts to release Johnny Fontane from a contract by Luca Brasi and Vito Corleone "making the band leader who held Johnny's contract an offer he couldn't refuse", according to Michael Corleone, telling the story to his girlfriend Kay Adams in Francis Ford Coppola's film The Godfather.
- In the "going to the mattresses" montage sequence of The Godfather, an authentic 1951 crime scene photo of Moretti's death is briefly shown. The sequence was edited by George Lucas as a favor to Coppola for funding American Graffiti.

American Mafia
Preceded by Frank "Chee" Gusage	Genovese crime family Underboss; 1937–1951	Succeeded by Vito Genovese
