= Richard Boiardo =

American mobster (1890–1984)

- Born: Ruggiero Boiardo; December 8, 1890; Naples, Kingdom of Italy
- Died: October 29, 1984 (aged 93); Newark, New Jersey, U.S.
- Burial place: Holy Cross Cemetery, North Arlington, New Jersey, US
- Other name: "The Boot" "Diamond Ritchie"
- Occupation: Mobster
- Allegiance: Genovese crime family
- Conviction: Conspiracy to violate gambling laws (1969)
- Penalty: Two-and-a-half to three years' imprisonment

Ruggiero Boiardo (December 8, 1890 – October 29, 1984), also known as "Richard Boiardo," "the Boot," or "Diamond Ritchie," was an Italian-American organized crime figure who got his start as a bootlegger during Prohibition, then emerged as one of the foremost mobsters in the greater Newark area, acting as a caporegime in the New Jersey faction of the Genovese crime family for over three decades.

== Early life ==
Boiardo was born on December 8, 1890 in Naples, and was raised in the town of Marigliano. He was placed in an orphanage as a child. He later claimed that he was the illegitimate son of an Italian nobleman who was a descendant of Matteo Maria Boiardo.

He immigrated to the United States in 1901, Boiardo first resided in Chicago, where he adopted the Americanized name of "Richard." He moved to Newark with his adoptive mother in either 1906 or 1910.

== Criminal career ==
=== The Prohibition era ===
==== Bootlegging ====
Prohibition began in the United States in 1920, presenting gangs with the opportunity to get rich through bootlegging, the production, importing, transportation and selling of illegal alcohol. Boiardo had already become involved in criminal activities by that point, as shown by his conviction in 1920 for operating a gambling house.

Boiardo got his start in bootlegging early in that decade while working as a milkman, delivering to speakeasies in Newark's First Ward, commonly referred to as "Newark's Little Italy." Boiardo learned that many of the speakeasies served "hair-tonic booze", drinks made from the alcohol used in hair tonic and cologne, cut with prune juice and caramel to mimic the color and taste of whiskey and rye. Boiardo arranged to purchase hair-tonic alcohol from John Serpico, a barber who also came from Marigliano, and sold the alcohol to speakeasies throughout Newark's Little Italy.

By 1925 Boiardo was overseeing a major bootlegging operation owned by Frank "Chichi" Mazzocchi, "Newark's Rum King," and his brothers, while also joining in robberies and other crimes committed by members of the Mazzocchi gang. Boiardo became known as "The Boot," a nickname which may have reflected his activities as a bootlegger.

In 1928 Boiardo broke with the Mazzocchis and formed his own gang. By the end of the decade he controlled a number of illegal lottery games, an extensive extortion racket that shook down merchants for protection money, several speakeasies, and a network of illegal stills hidden in the First Ward and in the surrounding rural areas. As the Great Depression deepened, Boiardo acquired even more abandoned farms for his stills and was able to stay ahead of Prohibition enforcement agents by moving production from one site to another.

==== Turf wars ====
The amount of money to be made in bootlegging led to violent competition for control of the business. Boiardo's chief rival was Abner "Longie" Zwillman, who was based in the Third Ward, where he controlled one of the largest bootlegging enterprises in New Jersey and the biggest numbers racket in Newark. Zwillman also had strong connections with Charles "Lucky" Luciano and Frank Costello through his associate Willie Moretti, a boyhood friend of and later strong-arm man for Costello.

In early 1930, Boiardo ordered his First Ward gang to expand into Zwillman's Third Ward territory and began demanding that saloon owners buy liquor from him, while hijacking trucks carrying beer trucks belonging to Zwillman, who retaliated in kind. This started the Newark bootleg war between Boiardo's First Ward gang and Zwillman's Third Ward gang. As the war escalated both Al Capone and Lucky Luciano intervened to try to hammer out a truce. Finally, after attempts to assassinate Boiardo and Zwillman failed, the two reached agreement on a truce in October 1930.

Boiardo celebrated his truce with Zwillman with a two-day banquet on October 5 and 6, 1930 at his Nuova Napoli restaurant, where more than a thousand local politicians, businessmen, current and retired law enforcement officers, gangsters and other invitees came in order to pay their respects to Boiardo, while also paying for the privilege. Zwillman showed up with his entourage on the second night, but declined to have his picture taken with Boiardo.

Zwillman was not Boiardo's only rival. Italian criminals in Newark were also divided for a time into two ethnic factions: the "Sicilians" and the "Neapolitans". The Sicilian Mafia faction was headed by Stefano "Don Steven" Badami, while the Neapolitan faction was led by Boiardo.

Boiardo had also come into conflict with Willie Moretti on several occasions, first by preventing Moretti from establishing a prostitution ring in the First Ward, then by attempting to expand his bootlegging and hijacking operations into Passaic County, which was in Moretti's territory, and hijacking trucks owned by Moretti's allies, Lepke Buchalter and Jacob "Gurrah" Shapiro.

Boiardo also had longstanding differences with his former boss, Frank Mazzocchi, which intensified after Mazzocchi allied himself with Zwillman's Third Ward gang. That conflict turned into open warfare in 1929 when Mazzocchi began encroaching on Boiardo's territory. Frank Mazzocchi was shot in front of the Victory Political Association, a club formerly known as the American Victory Café and owned by his brother, Dominick, on May 5, 1930; he died the following night.

During Thanksgiving week of November 1930, Boiardo survived an attempt on his life when a gunman fired a shotgun into his car, hitting him in the neck, mouth, chest and arm. In his hospital room the police gave Boiardo descriptions of the men who had shot at him, but Boiardo shrugged and told them that he "had no enemies that he knew of". When the police suggested to him it was in his own self-interest to identify his assailants, he told them "If they want to finish me off, what can I do about it? I'm no crybaby, I can take my medicine." No one was arrested for this attempted murder.

At the time, the press suspected Zwillman. Other likely suspects included Willie Moretti and even his friend Al Capone. The assailants might have even come from his own crew, or from others with more personal agendas. "None of Ritchie's gang is above suspicion of planning the murder of their leader," the Newark Evening News reported. "There are also said to be men who would like to see Ritchie out of the way because of certain women who favored him with their regard."

The evidence pointed, however, to Frank Mazzocchi's surviving brothers. Several members of the Mazzocchi crew, including both Dominick and John Mazzocchi, were killed in the year and a half after the November attempt on Boiardo's life. Other members of the crew, including Angelo "Gyp" DeCarlo, defected to join Boiardo's gang.

When Boiardo was released from the hospital in early December 1930 he was arrested for having a gun in his possession during the assassination attempt on him; he was later sentenced to two and a half years in prison for that crime. Boiardo resumed control of his gang after he was paroled on November 23, 1932. He then proceeded to systematically eliminate his associates who had run his gang during his incarceration.

Meanwhile, Boiardo's other rival for control of Newark's rackets, Stefano Badami, saw his position weaken with the killing of Salvatore Maranzano in 1931 following the end of the Castellammarese War, followed a few days later by the murder of two of Badami's key supporters. Badami fled Newark, leaving the family without leadership.

The Commission, established after the Castellammarese War to manage disputes between organized crime outfits, decided to disband the Newark crime family after first Stefano Badami and then Gaspare D'Amico were driven out of the city. The Commission then declared Newark an open city and divided the Newark crime family's territory among the Five Families of New York.

=== Post-Prohibition years ===
==== Boiardo's ascent within organized crime ====
Boiardo's stature increased after Badami and D'Amico left the city, based on his ties to the Luciano crime family and his now-cooperative relationship with Longie Zwillman. When the Commission decided in 1935 to eliminate Dutch Schultz, the erratic Bronx mobster who had threatened to kill murder Special Prosecutor Thomas E. Dewey, Luciano gave the job to Zwillman, who asked Boiardo to provide additional members of the hit squad. The Luciano-Genovese family's New Jersey faction grew in power as well as Boiardo became the family's caporegime of the Newark crew and powerful New Jersey mobster Willie Moretti became the family's underboss, while also controlling operations in Bergen county.

Boiardo became a made man, or full member of the Luciano crime family in 1946, according to conversations between other New Jersey mobsters taped by the FBI. With Abner Zwillman's death in 1959, Boiardo became the undisputed mob boss of Newark.

While Boiardo continued to engage in bootlegging, even after the end of Prohibition, he devoted most of his energy to gambling, loansharking and labor racketeering. He prohibited his crew and other gangsters from engaging in prostitution in the First Ward or drug trafficking. In the 1950s Boiardo and members of his crew began expanding their domain to include casinos in Las Vegas, Havana, and the British West Indies, as well as gambling operations in Florida.

==== Boiardo's public profile ====
Boiardo was already a highly respected figure early in his career, due in large part to his bravery in rescuing the lifeless body of the godmother of one of his daughters when a fire broke out in her house during her wake. When he was shot in 1930, a thousand people crowded into St. Lucy's Church to pray for his recovery.

Boiardo burnished that image by both public and private acts of philanthropy. He helped finance the construction of St. Lucy's, funded soup kitchens in the First Ward, bought clothes for orphans, covered funeral expenses of needy families, and (by his account) gave away millions to poor residents of the First Ward during the Depression.

Those activities helped make Boiardo a Democratic power broker in the First Ward. As Boiardo's obituary in the Newark Star-Ledger noted, "Voters traditionally went for the candidate Boiardo felt could do the most good for him and his organization."

The extent of his influence was revealed in 1950 by the guest list at the wedding of his son "Tony Boy" Boiardo, which was attended by more than a thousand invitees, including Ralph A. Villani, at that time the mayor of Newark, Hugh Addonizio, then a U.S. congressman and later Mayor of Newark, Congressman Peter Rodino, Willie Moretti, and Gerardo "Jerry" Catena, future acting boss of the Genovese crime family, who served as best man. A crowd of approximately fifteen thousand onlookers watched the procession of limousines to and from St. Lucy's Church.

Boiardo owned a number of restaurants, sometimes putting ownership in the name of his son, Anthony "Tony Boy" Boiardo. He also used his restaurants to ingratiate himself with both politicians and celebrities, such as Frank Sinatra, Frankie Valli, Joe DiMaggio, and George Raft.

Boiardo and his son "Tony Boy" also had stakes in other ostensibly legitimate businesses, such as the Valentine Electric Company, Harrison Oil Company and Boiardo Construction. These businesses were frequently able to underbid their competitors, both because they could count on no delays due to strikes or other activities when calculating their bids, and also because they regularly paid kickbacks to the public officials who approved their contracts.

For all his influence, both within and outside organized crime, Boiardo was not trusted or respected by some of the other members of organized crime with whom he was most closely associated. In a conversation recorded by the FBI in the early 1960s, two other captains in the Genovese crime family, Anthony "Little Pussy" Russo and Angelo "Gyp" DeCarlo, agreed that both Richard Boiardo and his son "Tony Boy" were "weasels" and described the senior Boiardo as "the most treacherous [expletive deleted] in the world."

==== Ceding territory to African-American rivals ====
In the 1960s Boiardo faced increasing competition from rival African-American numbers operations. Black numbers runners working for Boiardo were beaten up and shot and some of Boiardo's numbers banks were held up. After the 1967 Newark riots Boiardo took a conciliatory approach, ceding the numbers business in Black communities to African-American numbers operators so long as they did not do business outside their community; in return the new African-American numbers banks used the Boiardo organization for laying off bets and paid protection money for its police and political connections.

==== Conviction and return to power ====
Boiardo was arrested on February 3, 1967, as part of a large-scale IRS sweep in which IRS agents searched storefronts, social clubs, and apartments throughout Newark and surrounding communities for evidence of illegal gambling. Boiardo was subsequently indicted, along with eighteen of his associates, for operating an illegal interstate gambling ring that, by the FBI's estimate, employed more than four hundred runners, who each averaged thirty thousand dollars in gambling action per year. While the federal charges against Boiardo and his codefendants were dismissed before trial because the underlying statute had been held to be unconstitutional, the State of New Jersey was able to use the same evidence to convict Boiardo on parallel state charges.

Boiardo was sentenced to two-and-a-half to three years in state prison. He began serving his sentence on November 18, 1970 after his conviction was affirmed on appeal.

Boiardo chose his son "Tony Boy" to run his crew while he was in prison. Tony Boy was not, however, popular with the troops: he had acquired a reputation as early as the 1950s, when his father was handing over some of his rackets to him, for spending too much time in Florida, Las Vegas, and Havana, where the Boiardi crew had interests, and neglecting the family's business in Newark. Early in the 1960s the FBI reported, based on its informants, that "Tony Boy is not well liked and probably will stay in power only so long as his father lives." Others within Boiardo's crew put it in stronger terms: Gyp DeCarlo and "Little Pussy" Russo were overheard by the FBI predicting that Tony Boy would be murdered once his father died.

Boiardo was released on parole at age 81 after one year in prison. Boiardo resumed leadership of his crew upon his release from prison.

While Boiardo had been appealing his conviction and then serving his prison sentence Tony Boy was indicted, along with Newark's Mayor Hugh Addonizio and a number of other current and former City officials, on charges of bribery, primarily through kickbacks to City officials related to City contracts with Valentine Electric Company, Inc., a business in which Boiardo played an active, but hard to define, role. Addonizio was convicted, ending his career in politics.

Tony Boy suffered a heart attack during the trial of the bribery charges against him. He was never healthy enough to stand trial on his extortion and conspiracy charges. At the time of Anthony's death in 1978, he was still awaiting trial.

== Personal life ==
Boiardo married Giovannina Jennie Manfro in 1912. Their first child, Agnes, was born a year later and Ruggiero Jr., who later would go by his middle name, Anthony, and nickname "Tony Boy," was born in 1916. Their third child, Mary, was born in 1919; their fourth, Carmenella, was born in 1920, but died from complications of bronchopneumonia eleven months later. Their fifth child, Rose, was born in 1926.

Their marriage was not a happy one: Ritchie was convicted of marital domestic violence and sentenced to one year of probation in 1920. During an argument over his womanizing in 1933, Jennie aimed a gun at him; Ritchie picked up their seven-year-old daughter Rose and used her as a shield. Jennie died in 1946 at the age of fifty-three following a gall bladder operation and years of alcoholism.

Ritchie arranged a memorial service for his late wife that the Newark Evening News described as "one of the most elaborate funerals Newark has seen in years." Politicians and celebrities, including Joe DiMaggio, attended her wake. The next day a cortege of thirty-one flower cars and fifty limousines made their way to Saint Lucy's for her funeral.

Boiardo and his family moved from Newark to his castle-like home in Livingston, New Jersey, about fifteen miles from Newark, in 1945. He used materials salvaged from Boiardo Construction demolition jobs in Newark, including large blocks of stone from the old Post Office building, to build a self-contained compound of four homes, as well as an aviary, a barn, swimming pools, a hunting lodge, an orchard, picnic grounds, and tennis and basketball courts; the estate also featured peacocks, deer and statues of the members of the Boiardo family. Life Magazine later described its architectural style as "Transylvania traditional."

The estate also had a large brick incinerator which, according to underworld lore, Boiardo used to dispose of the bodies of murder victims. While Boiardo angrily denied that he had ever done anything of the sort, Anthony Russo was taped by the FBI describing how he first killed a victim, then "I ... brought ... him in the tank—and then they were done with it. Everything was ... set.... Good hot fire[,] ... matches and everything, you know."

Boiardo also owned residences in Havana and Florida, where he had major gambling interests.

Boiardo was overweight but a very flashy dresser, often wearing a belt buckle studded with 150 diamonds that had an estimated worth of $20,000, a five-carat diamond ring, and a fifteen-diamond pin to hold his tie in place. He acquired the nickname "Diamond Ritchie" as a result.

Boiardo became an American citizen in 1929.

== Death ==
Boiardo died of natural causes on October 29, 1984, aged 93. He was interred at Holy Cross Cemetery in North Arlington, New Jersey.

== Popular culture ==
- David Chase, the creator of the HBO TV series The Sopranos, said the Soprano family was based on the Boiardo crime family, and their crews. The character Ercole/Eckley "The Boot" DiMeo is mentioned in the original series and portrayed by Chase in The Many Saints of Newark.
- Richard Linnett's biography of Boiardo, In the Godfather Garden: The Long Life and Times of Richie the Boot Boiardo (2013), is based on archival material, classified and unclassified FBI and police files, interviews with Boiardo's family and friends, and the personal recollections of the Boot's grandson Roger Hanos.

== Bibliography ==
- Bureau of Narcotics, U.S. Treasury Department (2007). Mafia: the Government's Secret File on Organized Crime. HarperCollins Publishers. ISBN 978-0-06-136385-6.
