= John DiGilio =

American mobster

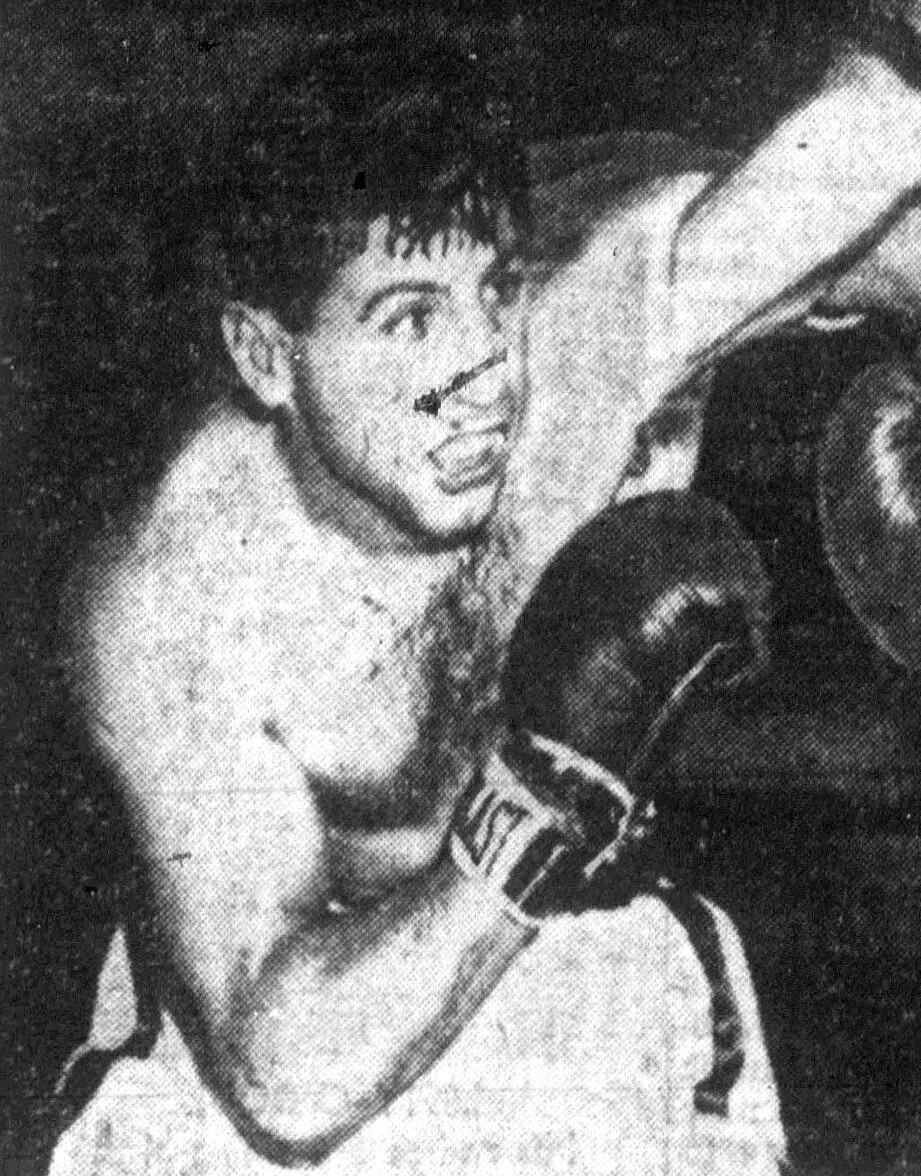
DiGilio in 1954

John Joseph DiGilio Sr., also known as "Johnny Dee", (December 5, 1932 – May 27, 1988), was a New Jersey mobster with the Genovese crime family who became a powerful organized crime leader in the New Jersey faction. He was born in Bayonne and died in Carlstadt.

== Biography ==
A former professional boxer and boatman on a tugboat, DiGilio had an athletic build with muscular shoulders. He was described as possessing an aura of self-confidence.

John DiGilio was born to first generation Italian-American immigrants and was the oldest of eight siblings; Theresa, Joseph, Judith, Frances, Anthony, Antoinette and Frank DiGilio.

To avoid confusion regarding Leonard (Lenny) DiGilio, public records show Leonard was never adopted by John DiGilio. Leonard changed his name from Leonard Brugnola to Leonard DiGilio when he was 25 years old. Public records regarding Leonard's name change can be found in the County of Sullivan signed by the Honorable Louis B. Scheinman.

== Boxing record ==
In 1950, DiGilio won the New York Daily News Golden Gloves 126 lb (57 kilos) Sub-Novice Championships by defeating Manuel Vinho of the New York City Department of Parks and Recreation. While a welterweight boxer, DiGilio trained at the Bayonne Police Department Police Athletic League in New Jersey. On October 16, 1950, DiGilio won his first professional boxing match against Tony Loti in Providence, Rhode Island. On April 8, 1954 in Newark, New Jersey, DiGilio defeated Felix Redondo for the New Jersey State Lightweight Title. On June 28, 1954 Cisco Andrade beat DiGilio by knockout at St. Nicholas Rink in New York City, New York in 2 minutes and 8 seconds. On November 18, 1955, while fighting Tommy Barto at Madison Square Garden in Manhattan, the referee stopped the fight and declared DiGilio the winner. On June 15, 1956, again at Madison Square Garden, DiGilio knocked down Johnny Busso in 1:39 minutes during the 4th round. However, the referee later stopped the fight due to cuts over DiGilio's eyes and gave the victory to Busso. On February 11, 1958 in Miami Beach, Florida, DiGilio lost, being knocked down in the 4th, 5th and 6th rounds. On March 29, 1958, DiGilio lost to Stefan Redl in Paterson, New Jersey for the New Jersey State Welterweight Championship.

In total, DiGilio boxed 231 rounds, won 28 matches, lost ten matches, and was knocked out in three matches. DiGilio stood at 5 foot 7 inches tall and, during his professional boxing career, he weighed in between 147 and 154 pounds (67 to 70 kilos).

== Involvement in organized crime ==
He lived in Bayonne, New Jersey. As a young man, DiGilio became involved in illegal gambling, loansharking, labor racketeering and extortion in the Genovese family. During the 1950s, under family boss Vito Genovese, DiGilio became a made man, or full family member. He later worked for boss Frank Tieri and Benny Malangone.

In 1968, DiGilio was indicted on extortion charges. DiGilio had made two $1,000 usurious loans in 1966 and 1967 to a New Jersey man who, after paying $7,400 interest, refused to pay anything else. The victim then receive a threatening call from DiGilio, which he recorded. DiGilio was able to prove that the voiceprint of the recording did not match his own voice, and was acquitted in 1970.

In the mid-1970s, DiGilio became secretary-treasurer of International Longshoremen's Association Local 1588 in Bayonne, New Jersey, a union local under Genovese control since the 1960s. DiGilio used his position to extort payments from shipping companies in exchange for smooth labor relations. In 1986, Fortune Magazine named DiGilio as number 39 on its list of the 50 most powerful Cosa Nostra bosses in the United States. As DiGilio's criminal activities attracted more law enforcement attention, he started displaying bizarre conduct. Law enforcement was unsure if the activities were genuine or just a ruse.

== Racketeering trials and death ==
In 1988, DiGilio and three other Genovese mobsters were indicted on federal racketeering charges. Defying his family bosses, DiGilio refused to retain a lawyer and instead mounted his own defense at the trial. During the trial, while arguing with the prosecuting attorney, DiGilio suffered a heart attack, but quickly recovered. While making his closing arguments, DiGilio dismissed Federal Bureau of Investigation (FBI) recordings of him as "locker room talk" and then dumped hundreds of cassette tapes into a garbage pail. On April 17, 1988, DiGilio was acquitted of racketeering, but the other defendants were convicted. The Genovese hierarchy was furious with DiGilio; they blamed him for the conviction of the other three men. What especially galled the leadership was that Donald Carson, one of the convicted defendants, was then forced to resign his position as secretary-treasurer of Local 1588. A Gambino crime family mobster replaced Carson at the local, effectively eliminating the Genovese family's major source of labor racketeering revenue.

Shortly after DiGilio's trial ended, his wife Ellen reported him missing to police. On May 26, 1988, DiGilio's body was discovered floating in a bag on the Hackensack River near Carlstadt, New Jersey. He had five bullet wounds to the head. In 1998, Genovese mobster Louis Auricchio, the brother-in-law of New Jersey senator John A. Lynch, Jr. confessed to shooting DiGilio while they were riding in a car. Louis Auricchio was released from prison on December 10, 2010, after serving his sentence.

Since DiGilio's death, his crew has passed to Auricchio, Angelo Prisco, Salvatore Lombardo, and Louis Manna.
