= Bonanza Gift Shop =

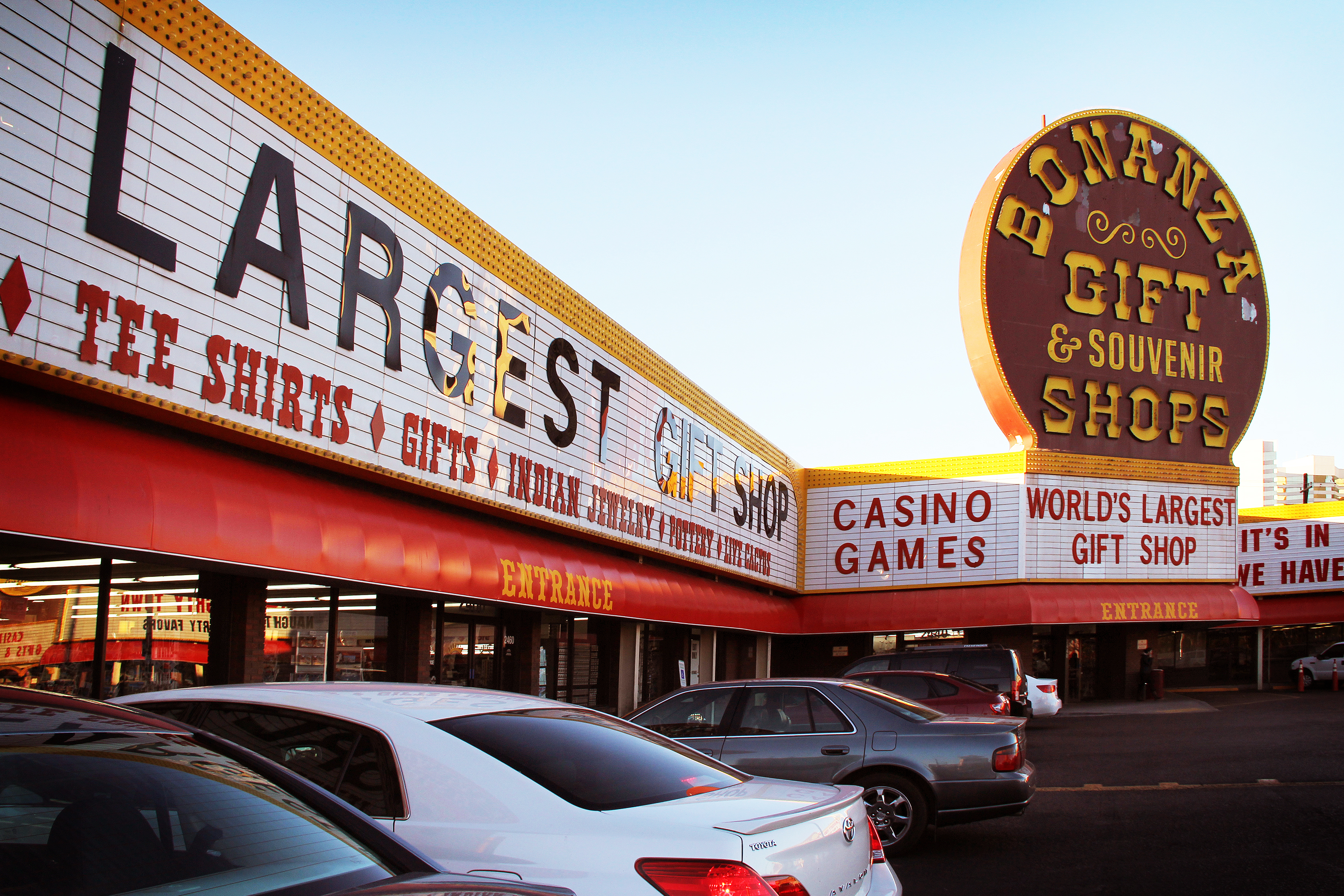
- Location: Paradise, Nevada, United States
- Coordinates: 36.1442°N 115.1579°W
- Address: 2440 South Las Vegas Boulevard
- Opened: 1980; 46 years ago
- Floor area: 40,000 square feet (3,700 m^{2})
- Floors: 1
- Website: bonanza-gift-shop.weeblyte.com

Bonanza Gift Shop is a landmark located on the Las Vegas Strip between the Sahara Las Vegas and the Stratosphere Las Vegas. It is billed as the World's Largest Gift Shop with over 40,000 square feet (3,700 m^{2}) of shopping space.

According to British Airways, the shop "won't let you down when looking for the perfect souvenir." However Fodor's says "Ok, so it may not, in fact, be the world's largest, but it's the city's largest—and for that matter, the city's best—souvenir store."

== History ==
Bonanza Gifts was established in 1980. Before Bonanza, the corner mall contained several smaller shops and casinos.

Former casino occupants at the location included: Honest John's (c. 1963-1981), Big Wheel Casino (c. 1971-1977, renamed Centerfold Casino in 1975), and Jolly Trolley (c. 1977-1981). Jolly Trolley was reportedly secretly owned by reputed mafia boss Anthony Russo. Bonanza's website also lists Jackpot Casino and Money Tree Casino as also previously occupying the site.

It was the Las Vegas Review-Journal's online readers pick for Best Gift Shop in 2006.

In 2016, the property was sold for $50 million to Haim Gabay, who had been operating the store as a tenant for a year.

=== Film history ===
The shop was featured on the PBS show Going Places. This store features in the 2016 Nicolas Cage movie The Trust.
