= Frank Costello =

Italian-American mobster (1891-1973)

- Costello testifying before the Kefauver Committee, 1951
- Born: Francesco Castiglia; January 26, 1891; Cassano allo Ionio, Calabria, Italy
- Died: February 18, 1973 (aged 82); New York City, U.S.
- Resting place: Saint Michael's Cemetery
- Occupations: Bootlegger; crime boss; mobster; racketeer
- Predecessor: Lucky Luciano
- Successor: Vito Genovese
- Spouse: Loretta Geigerman (m. 1914)
- Allegiance: Luciano crime family
- Convictions: Contempt (1951); Tax evasion (1952)
- Penalty: 18 months' imprisonment Five years' imprisonment

Frank Costello (Italian: [koˈstɛllo]; born Francesco Castiglia [franˈtʃesko kaˈstiʎʎa]; January 26, 1891 – February 18, 1973) was an Italian-American mafioso and boss of the Luciano crime family (later known as the Genovese crime family) in New York City from 1938 to 1957. Known as the “Prime Minister of the Underworld”, Costello was noted for his political connections and for a leadership style that emphasized diplomacy and business dealings. His televised testimony at the 1951 Kefauver Committee hearings caught nationwide attention and brought public awareness to the extent of organized crime in the United States.

Born in Calabria, Italy, he moved with his family to the United States as a child. As a youth he joined gangs in New York City. Working with Charlie “Lucky” Luciano, Costello was involved in bootlegging operations during Prohibition. In 1929 they joined the National Crime Syndicate. After Luciano was imprisoned in 1936, he continued to run the family from prison through acting boss Vito Genovese. In 1937, Genovese fled to Naples to avoid a murder indictment in New York. Following this, Luciano appointed Costello, who had risen to the rank of consigliere, as the new acting boss. After the United States Supreme Court refused to review Luciano’s case in October 1938, Costello became boss of the Luciano crime family, although Luciano continued to wield considerable power and influence within the American Mafia.

In the 1950s, Costello was convicted of tax evasion and served time in prison. In 1957, he survived an assassination attempt in which he was shot in the head outside his Manhattan apartment building by Vincent Gigante, acting on the orders of Genovese. However, the bullet only grazed his head. Costello subsequently retired, with Genovese succeeding him as boss of the family, which became known as the Genovese crime family. He remained largely out of the spotlight for the remainder of his life until his death from a heart attack in 1973 at the age of 82.

== Early life ==
Costello was born Francesco Castiglia on January 26, 1891, in Lauropoli, a frazione of the town of Cassano allo Ionio in the province of Cosenza in the Calabria region, Italy. In 1895, he boarded a ship to the United States with his mother and his brother Edward to join their father, who had moved to New York City's East Harlem several years earlier and opened a small neighborhood Italian grocery store.

While Costello was still a boy, his brother introduced him to gang activities. At 13, he had become a member of a local gang and started using the name Frankie. Costello committed petty crimes and went to jail for assault and robbery in 1908, 1912, and 1917.

On September 22, 1914, Costello married Loretta "Bobbie" Geigerman, a Jewish woman, whose parents had immigrated from the German Empire. That same year, Costello served ten months in jail for carrying a concealed weapon.

== Criminal career ==
=== Alliance with Luciano ===
Charles "Lucky" Luciano's mugshot

While working for the Morello gang, Costello met Charlie "Lucky" Luciano, the Sicilian leader of Manhattan's Lower East Side gang. The two Italians immediately became friends and partners. Several older members of Luciano's mob family disapproved of this growing partnership. They were mostly old-school mafiosi who were unwilling to work with anyone who was not Italian, and skeptical at best about working with non-Sicilians. To Luciano's shock, they warned him against working with Costello, whom they called "the dirty Calabrian."

Along with Italian American associates Vito Genovese and Tommy "Three-Finger Brown" Lucchese, and Jewish associates Meyer Lansky and Benjamin "Bugsy" Siegel, the gang became involved in robbery, theft, extortion, gambling, and narcotics. The Luciano-Costello-Lansky-Siegel alliance prospered even further with the passage of Prohibition in 1920. The gang went into bootlegging, backed by criminal financier Arnold "the Brain" Rothstein.

The young Italians' success let them make business deals with the leading Jewish and Irish criminals of the era, including Dutch Schultz, Owney "the Killer" Madden and William "Big Bill" Dwyer. Rothstein became a mentor to Costello, Luciano, Lansky and Siegel while they conducted bootlegging business with Bronx beer baron Schultz. In 1922, Costello, Luciano, and their closest Italian associates joined the Sicilian crime family led by Joe "the Boss" Masseria, a top Italian underworld crime boss. By 1924, Costello had become a close associate of Hell's Kitchen's Irish crime bosses Dwyer and Madden. He became involved in their rum-running operations, known as "The Combine"; this might have prompted him to change his last name to the Irish "Costello."

In 1925, Costello became a U.S. citizen.

On November 19, 1926, Costello and Dwyer were indicted on federal bootlegging charges. They were accused of bribing two U.S. Coast Guardsmen, presumably so that they would not disturb the unloading of liquor from boats in New York Harbor. The largest boat in the Combine fleet could carry 20,000 cases of liquor. In January 1927, the jury deadlocked on the bootlegging charges for Dwyer and Costello.

In 1926, Dwyer was convicted of bribing a Coast Guard official and sentenced to two years in jail. After Dwyer was imprisoned, Costello and Madden took over the Combine's operations. This caused friction between Madden and a top Dwyer lieutenant, Charles "Vannie" Higgins, who believed he should have been running the Combine instead of Costello. Thus, the "Manhattan Beer Wars" began between Higgins on one side, and Costello, Madden, and Schultz on the other. At this time, Schultz was also having problems with gangsters Jack "Legs" Diamond and Vincent "Mad Dog" Coll, who had begun to rival Schultz and his partners with Higgins's help. Eventually, the Costello-Madden-Schultz alliance was destroyed by New York's underworld.

In the late 1920s, Johnny Torrio helped to organize a loose cartel of East Coast bootleggers, the Big Seven, in which a number of prominent gangsters, including Costello, Luciano, Longy Zwillman, Joe Adonis, and Meyer Lansky played a part. Torrio also supported creation of a national body that would prevent the sort of all-out turf wars between gangs that had broken out in Chicago and New York. His idea was well received, and a conference was hosted in Atlantic City by Torrio, Lansky, Luciano and Costello in May 1929; the National Crime Syndicate was created.

==== Joe Kennedy and bootlegging ====
Costello claimed to have been involved in bootlegging with Joseph P. Kennedy Sr., the father of future president John F. Kennedy. He told a number of friends, including the columnist John Miller, that he had been in business with Kennedy. According to Costello, Kennedy approached him for assistance and an arrangement was reached whereby Kennedy brought the liquor to Rum Row and Costello took care of the rest. Costello biographer Leonard Katz interviewed a former New Orleans attorney for Costello who wished to remained anonymous; he told Katz that one day he arrived in Costello's apartment to find him having an angry telephone conversation, when Costello hung up he asked who he was speaking with, to which Costello allegedly responded "that Kennedy fella from Boston".

The Kennedy family has denied this, with Kennedy's son-in-law Stephen Edward Smith stating there was no evidence in Kennedy's business records that he was involved in bootlegging, stating "I can't say he never talked to Costello, but I never heard of it, and I'm sure it would come as news to anybody in the family". One of Costello's biographers George Wolf has also been critical of the claims. He points to Costello's testimony in a closed session of the State Liquour Commission in the late 1940s. When asked about his connection with the House of Lords Scotch distribution he listed a "Joe Kennedy" as a partner. When the committee inquired if this was the well-known Joe Kennedy, he replied "Hell, no" and clarified that he was speaking about "Joe Kennedy, the old bootlegger in Toronto. I known him twenty-five years". Wolf considered Costello's claims to be "yet another indication of Frank's long yearning for legitimacy, to be "associated with the right people"."

=== Castellammarese War ===
In early 1931, the Castellammarese War broke out between Masseria and Salvatore Maranzano. In a secret deal with Maranzano, Luciano agreed to engineer the death of his boss, Masseria, in return for receiving Masseria's rackets and becoming Maranzano's second-in-command. On April 15, 1931, Luciano had lured Masseria to a meeting where he was murdered at a restaurant called Nuova Villa Tammaro on Coney Island. While they played cards, Luciano allegedly excused himself to the bathroom, with the gunmen reportedly being Genovese, Albert Anastasia, Joe Adonis, and Benjamin "Bugsy" Siegel; Ciro "The Artichoke King" Terranova drove the getaway car, but legend has it that he was too shaken up to drive away and had to be shoved out of the driver's seat by Siegel. Luciano took over Masseria's family, with Genovese as his underboss.

In September 1931, Luciano and Genovese planned the murder of Maranzano. Luciano had received word that Maranzano was planning to kill him and Genovese, and prepared a hit team to kill Maranzano first. On September 10, 1931, when Maranzano summoned Luciano, Genovese, and Costello to a meeting at his office, they knew Maranzano would kill them there. Instead, Luciano sent to Maranzano's office four Jewish gangsters whose faces were unknown to Maranzano's people. They had been secured with the aid of Lansky and Siegel. After assassinating Maranzano, Luciano subsequently created The Commission to serve as the governing body for organized crime.

=== Years as consigliere ===
In 1931, after the Masseria and Maranzano murders, Luciano became the leader of the new Luciano crime family, with Genovese as underboss and Costello as consigliere. Costello quickly became one of the biggest earners for the Luciano family and began to carve his own niche in the underworld. He controlled the slot machine and bookmaking operations for the family with associate Philip "Dandy Phil" Kastel. Costello placed approximately 25,000 slot machines in bars, restaurants, cafes, drugstores, gas stations, and bus stops throughout New York. In 1934, Mayor Fiorello La Guardia confiscated thousands of Costello's slot machines, loaded them on a barge, and dumped them into the river.

Costello's next move was to accept Louisiana governor Huey Long's proposal to put slot machines throughout Louisiana for 10% of the take. Costello made Kastel overseer of the Louisiana slot operation. Kastel had the assistance of New Orleans mafioso Carlos "Little Man" Marcello. Costello brought in millions of dollars in profit from slot machines and bookmaking to the Luciano family.

=== "The Prime Minister" ===
Costello and Luciano established extensive connections with Tammany Hall leaders early on; Luciano and Costello each shared hotel rooms with Tammany delegates to the 1932 Democratic National Convention in Chicago. Costello continued to cultivate those relationships over the next two decades, intervening in Tammany's affairs and collecting favors and pledges of loyalty from those politicians and judges he had helped, including William O'Dwyer, the two-term Mayor of New York City in the 1940s. Costello was able, in turn, to use those political debts to his advantage when other New York City crime families came to him for help.

In the 1940s Costello developed a relationship with Carlos Marcello in Louisiana. He arranged a deal with Marcello whereby he would utilize Jefferson Music Company and Southern News Service, both companies Marcello owned, to control the pinballs, slot machines, and horse-playing handbooks in Louisiana. He also joined Marcello and Meyer Lansky as a partner in the New Southport and Beverly Club casinos of Jefferson Parish, Louisiana. In 1946 he attended the Havana Conference in Cuba.

Costello was acquainted with FBI director J. Edgar Hoover. The extent of the relationship is unclear, with Costello biographer Leonard Katz describing it as "hardly an intimate relationship". Costello personally disliked Hoover, who he considered a "professional blackmailer". They were both frequent patrons of the Stork Club and the Waldorf in New York were they would run into one another. Reportedly Hoover asked Costello to share a coffee with him at the Waldorf, when Costello joked "I got to be careful of my associates. They'll accuse me of consorting with questionable characters". Hoover biographer Curt Gentry, who is critical of some accounts of their meetings such as that they met in Central Park on a bench, notes that "Hoover was much too conscious of his reputation to be seen fraternizing with so notorious a gangster as Costello" but that nonetheless "there is no question they met or that they reached an accommodation, of sorts". Hoover is said to have told Costello that so long as he stayed out of his "bailiwick", he would stay out of Costello's, who generally stayed away from committing federal crimes.

The 1951 Kefauver Committee hearings on organized crime confirmed what observers of local politics already knew. Senator Kefauver concluded that Carmine DeSapio, leader of Tammany Hall, was assisting Costello and that Costello had become influential in decisions made by the Tammany Hall council. DeSapio admitted to having met Costello several times, but insisted that "politics was never discussed".

=== Conflicts with Genovese ===
In 1936, Luciano was convicted of running a prostitution ring and was sentenced to a term of up to 30 to 50 years in state prison. He attempted to run the crime family from prison with the help of Costello and Lansky, but found it too difficult. With Luciano's imprisonment, Genovese became acting boss of the Luciano crime family.

In 1937, Genovese fled to Italy to avoid prosecution for a 1934 murder. Luciano then appointed Costello as acting boss. Costello's underboss was his cousin Willie Moretti.

Genovese returned to the United States in 1945. After the 1934 murder charges were dismissed following the death of two witnesses, Genovese tried to convince Luciano to become a titular boss of bosses and let Genovese run everything. Luciano not only rejected Genovese's proposal, but kept Costello and Moretti as acting boss and underboss.

=== Investigation, prosecution and imprisonment ===
From May 1950 to May 1951, the U.S. Senate conducted a large-scale investigation of organized crime, commonly known as the Kefauver Hearings, chaired by Senator Estes Kefauver of Tennessee. Costello attempted to minimize the impact of these hearings on his reputation when he was called as a witness, refusing to allow his face to be filmed during his questioning.

His demands had the opposite effect, as the news cameras focused instead on his hands as Costello fidgeted throughout the hearings, broadcasting his evasive answers and nervous gestures live to a huge nationwide audience. After sparring with the lawyers for the Committee for hours on the first day, he walked out of the hearing on the second day, claiming that he had a sore throat. When he returned to be questioned several days later he refused to answer questions about his net worth. Costello was eventually convicted of contempt of the Senate and sentenced to 18 months in prison for his refusal to answer questions.

The Kefauver hearings also led to the murder of Willie Moretti on October 4, 1951, on the orders of the Mafia Commission. The members of the Commission were concerned with Moretti's erratic behavior before the Senate Committee and worried that Moretti's advancing syphilis was affecting his brain and might lead him to talk to the press. Costello appointed Genovese as the new underboss after Moretti's murder.

In 1952, the government began proceedings to strip Costello of his U.S. citizenship, and he was indicted for evasion of $73,417 in income taxes between 1946 and 1949 ($870,113 in 2024 dollars). He was sentenced to five years in prison and fined $20,000. In 1954, Costello appealed the conviction and was released on $50,000 bail; from 1952 to 1961 he was in and out of half a dozen federal and local prisons and jails, his confinement interrupted by periods when he was out on bail pending determination of appeals.

=== Assassination attempt and aftermath ===
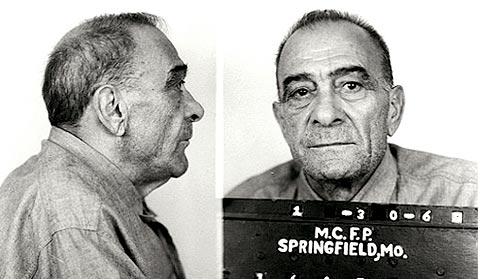
Vito Genovese's mugshot

In 1956, Adonis, a powerful Costello ally, chose deportation to Italy over a long prison sentence. His departure left Costello weakened, but Genovese still had to neutralize one more powerful Costello ally, Anastasia, who had taken over the Mangano crime family after the disappearance of boss Vincent Mangano and the murder of his brother Philip Mangano on April 14, 1951.

In early 1957, Genovese decided to move on Costello. Genovese ordered Vincent Gigante to murder Costello, and on May 2, 1957, Gigante shot and wounded Costello outside his apartment building. The altercation persuaded Costello to relinquish power to Genovese and retire. Genovese then controlled what is now called the Genovese crime family. A doorman identified Gigante as the gunman, but in 1958 Costello testified that he was unable to recognize his assailant; Gigante was acquitted of attempted murder.

On October 25, 1957, Anastasia was murdered at the barber shop of the Park Sheraton Hotel at 56th Street and 7th Avenue in Manhattan. Carlo Gambino was expected to be proclaimed boss of Anastasia's family at the November 14, 1957 Apalachin Meeting that Genovese called to discuss the future of Cosa Nostra in light of his takeover. When police raided the meeting, to the detriment of Genovese's reputation, Gambino's appointment was postponed to a later meeting in New York City.

In 1959, Genovese was convicted of selling a large quantity of heroin. On April 17, 1959, Genovese was sentenced to 15 years in the Atlanta Federal Penitentiary in Atlanta, Georgia.

== Retirement and death ==
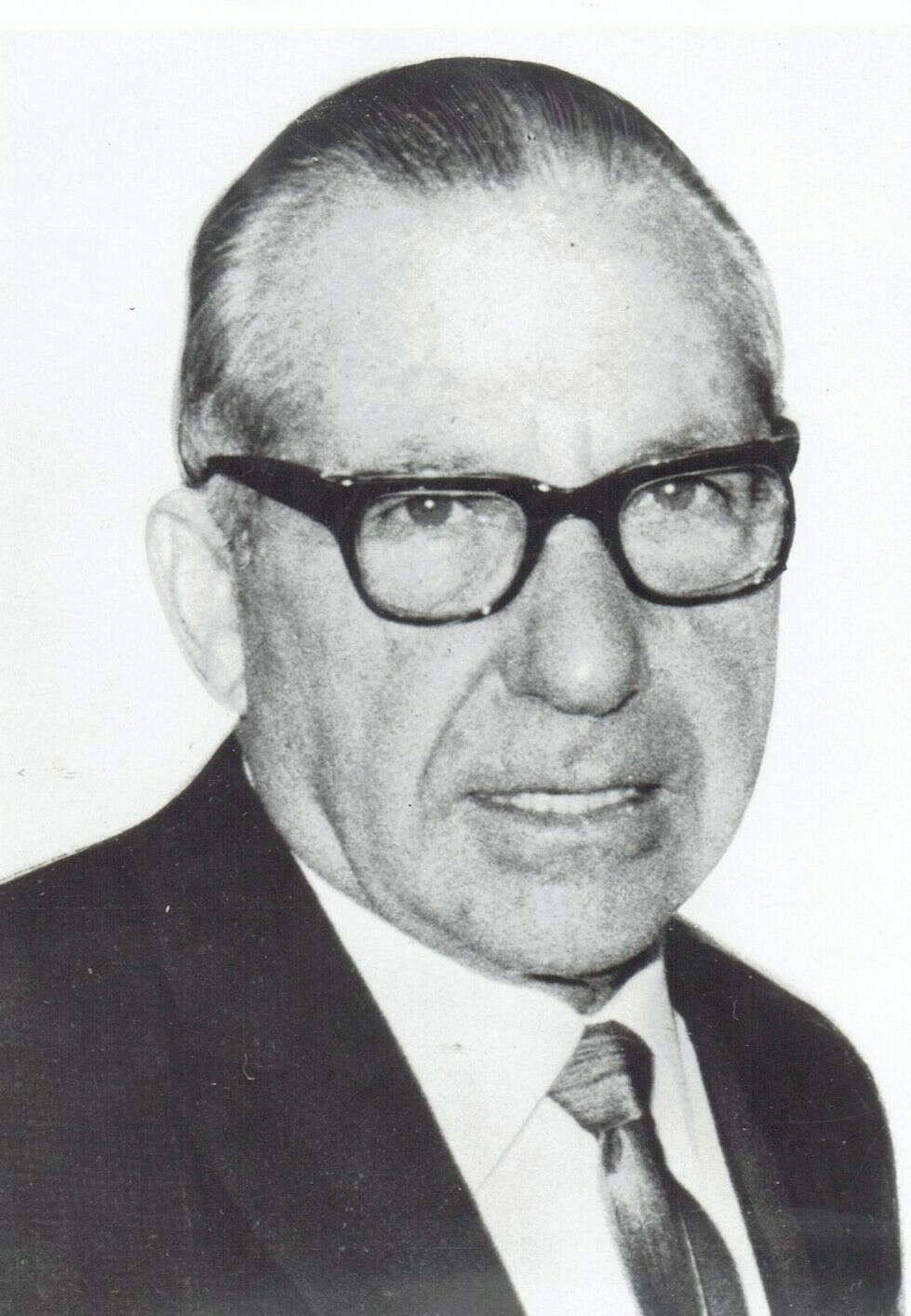
Costello in 1964

During his retirement, Costello was still known as "The Prime Minister of the Underworld". He still retained power and influence in New York's Mafia and remained busy throughout his final years. Cosa Nostra bosses and old associates such as Gambino and Lucchese still paid visits to Costello at his Waldorf Astoria penthouse, seeking advice on important Mafia affairs. Costello's old friend Meyer Lansky also kept in touch. Costello occupied himself with gardening and displayed some of his flowers at local horticultural shows.

On February 20, 1961, the United States Supreme Court upheld a lower court order that stripped Costello of his US citizenship. But on February 17, 1964, the same court set aside a deportation order for Costello, citing a legal technicality.

In early February 1973, Costello suffered a heart attack at his Manhattan home and was rushed to Doctors Hospital in Manhattan, where he died on February 18. Costello's sedate memorial service at a Manhattan funeral home was attended by 50 relatives, friends, and law enforcement agents. Costello is interred in a private mausoleum in St. Michael's Cemetery in East Elmhurst, Queens. In 1974, after his enemy Carmine Galante was released from prison, he allegedly ordered the bombing of the doors to Costello's mausoleum.

== In popular culture ==
Costello has been portrayed in several films, including by actors Feodor Chaliapin Jr. in My Brother Anastasia (1973), James Andronica in Gangster Wars (1981), Carmine Caridi in Bugsy (1991), Costas Mandylor in Mobsters (1991), and Robert De Niro in The Alto Knights (2025). He has also been portrayed in television series, including by actors Kirk Baltz in Kingfish: A Story of Huey P. Long (1995), Anthony DiCarlo in the docudrama The Making of the Mob: New York (2015), and Paul Sorvino in Godfather of Harlem (2019).

Costello was referenced in the Allen Ginsberg poem "Hadda Be Playing on the Jukebox". The lines are written: 'It had to be FBI chief J. Edgar Hoover / and Frank Costello syndicate mouthpiece / meeting in Central Park, New York weekends, / reported posthumously Time magazine'. The poem was later performed live (with music) by the band Rage Against the Machine on the album Live & Rare. Costello is mentioned in passing in the film Mikey and Nicky (1976), when Mikey (portrayed by Peter Falk), asks his friend Nicky (portrayed by John Cassavetes), a mobster in hiding with a contract on him, if Frank Costello was the one who tipped him off about the contract.

American Mafia
Unknown	Genovese crime family Consigliere; 1931–1937	Succeeded by "Sandino"
Preceded by Vito Genovese	Genovese crime family Acting boss 1937–1946	Succeeded by Himself as boss
Preceded by Lucky Luciano	Genovese crime family Boss; 1946–1957	Succeeded by Vito Genovese
Preceded by Vincent Mangano as boss of bosses	Capo di tutti capi Chairman of the Commission; 1951–1957	Succeeded by Vito Genovese as boss of bosses
