= Angelo Prisco =

American mobster

- New Jersey Casino Control Commission picture of Angelo Prisco
- Born: August 1, 1939; Harlem, New York, U.S.
- Died: June 21, 2017 (aged 77); Sumter County, Florida, U.S.
- Other name: The Horn
- Conviction: Murder (2009)
- Penalty: Life imprisonment

Angelo Prisco (August 1, 1939 – June 21, 2017) also known as "The Horn", was an American mobster in New Jersey who became a caporegime in the Genovese crime family.

Prisco was a relative of Genovese crime family soldier Rudolph "Rudy" Prisco who was identified along with hundreds as members of the crime family by Joe Valachi and convicted of crimes. Prisco was a member of the Purple Gang during the 1970s. He was later invited to join the Genovese family after the Purple Gang disbanded and later become a made man. With the 1988 murder of Genovese caporegime John DiGilio, Prisco assumed control of the Genovese family operations in New Jersey.

In 1992, Prisco ordered the murder of Genovese family associate Angelo Sanguiolo. After discovering that Sanguiolo had robbed four Genovese gambling operations in the Bronx, Prisco received permission from Genovese boss Vincent Gigante to kill Sanguiolo. In 1994, Prisco was charged with the 1988 DiGilio murder as part of a racketeering indictment. However, in 1998, Prisco was allowed to plead guilty only to arson and was sentenced to 12 years in New Jersey state prison.

In 2002, Prisco applied to the New Jersey State Parole Board for early release, but was denied. However, in May of that year, the parole board reversed their decision and in August Prisco was released from prison.

In 2003, a parole board member complained to the State Attorney General's office that the parole board chairman told him an aide to Governor James McGreevey had requested Prisco's release. The governor and his aide immediately denied the allegations. After an investigation by the Attorney General, no criminal charges were filed. However, $485,000 was paid as a result of a whistleblower suit based on retaliatory actions against him.

In 2006, Prisco was charged with extorting an electrician to not bid for a job so that a mob-related electrical company could win the business.

In December 2008, Prisco was indicted in New York for the 1992 Sanguiolo murder, along with extorting a Manhattan-based construction business, dealing in stolen property, and illegal gambling. On August 18, 2009, Prisco was sentenced to life in prison for the Sanguiolo murder.

Prisco died serving a life sentence at the United States Penitentiary, Coleman in Central Florida on June 21, 2017.
