= Anthony Russo (mobster) =

American mobster (1916–1979)

Anthony Russo (July 13, 1916 – April 26, 1979), also known as Little Pussy, was an Italian-American Genovese crime family figure who was a reputed Boss of Monmouth County, New Jersey. He is also the supposed inspiration behind the fictional character Gennaro "Little Pussy" Malanga from The Sopranos.

== Background ==
Russo and his brother John were a skilled cat burglar team during their youth, which is how he earned his nickname "Little Pussy", short for "Little Pussycat". He started his career as a personal chauffeur and bodyguard to Vito Genovese, and later worked as a loanshark. He lived in Long Branch, New Jersey, and was a made man in the Newark, New Jersey crew of the Genovese crime family which was run by veteran mobster Ruggiero "Richie the Boot" Boiardo.

From 1976 to 1978, Russo was a hidden owner in the Jolly Trolley Casino in Las Vegas (now the site of the Bonanza Gift Shop). During that time, he was involved in skimming the profits from the casino.

== Death ==
Russo was shot to death in Long Branch, New Jersey, on April 26, 1979, while on an Easter furlough from prison. His killers were identified in FBI reports as Thomas "Pee Wee" DePhillips, a capo in the Genovese family, Anthony DeVingo, a soldier and enforcer in the Genovese family who controlled gambling and loansharking in parts of Essex County, and Joseph "Joe Z" Zarro, an alleged Genovese associate whose operation spread into Passaic County. "It was a typical mob contract", said one investigator familiar with the case. "It was obvious from the start it was someone he knew, someone he trusted." Federal authorities indicated they always suspected DeVingo, but couldn't produce enough evidence to charge him. No weapons were ever recovered.
