= Wire room =

Wire room may refer to:

- Wire Room, a 2022 American action thriller film
- Wiring closet, a set location where computer wiring for a facility is centralized

== See also ==
- Wire (disambiguation)
- Room (disambiguation)
