= Irwin Schiff (contractor) =

American businessman and mob associate (1937–1987)

Irwin "The Fat Man" Schiff (January 5, 1937 – August 8, 1987) was a New York City businessman and mob associate. On paper, he was the head of Construction Coordinators Corp. of Queens that had neither a phone number nor office. He has been said to be a loanshark linked to the Mafia and seen dining with Lucchese crime family boss Anthony Corallo. Schiff identified himself as a financial consultant.

== Biography ==
Schiff was born in The Bronx on January 5, 1937, and attended William Howard Taft High School (New York City).

He lived in a five bedroom penthouse on the Upper East Side that cost $13000 a month and drove an antique Stutz Bearcat valued at $185,000.

Schiff told friends he owned the Georgian Hotel in Lake George (town), New York and the Upper West Side nightclub China Grove, though those claims have been disputed.

His role as an informant for the FBI, since 1978, included giving them information on Donald Manes and his taking bribes, according to court records in Newark, New Jersey. He also gave them information about the Jacob Javits Center concerning theft and corruption by contractors. Court records show Schiff had a controlling interest in Luis Electric Contracting Corporation, a Long Island City based firm that worked on the Javits Center.

=== Criminal history ===
In 1962, Schiff was convicted of writing fraudulent checks and pleaded guilty to tax evasion in 1977. He was given a five-year suspended sentence and fined $5000. At the time of his death, he was under investigation by the Internal Revenue Service and facing court judgments of approximately $1 million.

He successfully dodged an American Express bill of $127,230 and a judgment of $1 million won by an ex-partner.

== Death ==
Schiff was murdered on August 8, 1987, while eating dinner at the Bravo Sergio restaurant on the Upper East Side of Manhattan. Louis "Bobby" Manna was convicted two years later of ordering the hit on Schiff. He was sentenced to 80 years. Richard DeSciscio was convicted as well, as the shooter. Recordings in a Hoboken, New Jersey restaurant, made three days earlier, where Manna, DeSciscio and restaurant owner Martin "Motts" Casella were identified as discussing the hit on Schiff.

Schiff's estate was "a $6 million empire, including a $1.5 million East Side penthouse, two Rolls Royces and a Lincoln Town Car, plus investments in a singing-sister act and an aborted movie project about mobster Lucky Luciano."
