= Gerardo Catena =

Italian-American mob boss (1902–2000)

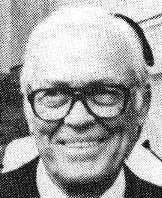
- Born: Gerardo Vito Catena; January 8, 1902; South Orange, New Jersey, U.S.
- Died: April 23, 2000 (aged 98); Boca Raton, Florida, U.S.
- Other name: Jerry
- Occupation: Mobster
- Allegiance: Genovese crime family

Gerardo Vito "Jerry" Catena (January 8, 1902 – April 23, 2000) was an American mobster and a top member of the Genovese crime family during the 1950s and 1960s, along with Thomas "Tommy Ryan" Eboli, Philip "Benny Squint" Lombardo and Michael "Big Mike" Miranda. He was ranked as the fourth richest mobster in the United States by Fortune magazine in 1986.

== Early life in Jersey ==
Catena was born on January 8, 1902, in South Orange, New Jersey to Francesco and Donata Speziale. He had one older brother, Leonard; three younger brothers, Eugene, Frank, and Anthony; and two sisters, Mary and Sadie.

He grew up in Newark's Fifth Ward and dropped out of school at age 14 to go to work. By the mid-1920s he was making a living as a bookie and bootlegger. His younger brothers followed him into the underworld.

Around that time Abner "Longy" Zwillman hired him to guard his liquor trucks and to serve as a bodyguard and driver. Catena was one of Zwillman's gunmen in his turf war with Richie "the Boot" Boiardo and was Zwillman's representative in the peace talks organized by Charles "Lucky" Luciano in 1930 to resolve that conflict.

== Post-Prohibition activities ==
Catena remained closely associated with Zwillman, particularly in connection with gambling, bootlegging, and other rackets in the Fifth Ward. Catena also worked for Guarino "Willie" Moretti, another ally of Zwillman's, who ran gambling operations in Bergen County, New Jersey and who rose to prominence in organized crime in the Genovese crime family. Catena became a made man, or full member of the Luciano crime family, in 1946, according to conversations between other New Jersey mobsters recorded many years later by the FBI.

Catena owned a number of businesses, including trucking and vending machine companies such as the Public Service Tobacco Company in Hillside, New Jersey, a cigarette vending-machine company that Catena co-owned with Zwillman, "Doc" Stacher, a major underworld figure, and Michael Lascari, a close friend of Luciano. Many of these ostensibly legitimate businesses were successful because of illegitimate practices: in the case of Public Service Tobacco Co., the company’s cigarette vending machines were forced on restaurants and stores that were threatened with violence if they refused. Catena also owned oil exploration assets in Oklahoma, real estate holdings in New Jersey, secret ownership of several Holiday Inns in northern New Jersey, and a significant share in Bally Manufacturing until corporate management discovered his underworld history.

In the 1950s Catena invested in the Riviera Casino in Havana along with Meyer Lansky, Florida crime boss Santo Trafficante Jr., and other organized crime and Las Vegas associates. Catena also took in over a million dollars a year from skimming profits from the Sands Hotel, Fremont Hotel, Horseshoe Casino, and the Flamingo.

Catena also took in more than $100,000 a year from labor racketeering activities involving those unions under the Genovese crime family's control, including the International Longshoremen’s Association, a number of Teamsters locals, and locals within the Retail Clerks International Association.

Catena had, by the FBI's estimate in 1961, accumulated more than $50,000,000 in personal wealth from these legal and illegal activities. As another New Jersey mobster was heard saying on the FBI's tape recordings around that time, "Jerry Catena has more fucking money than God."

== Rise within the Genovese crime family ==
Lucky Luciano was sentenced to 30 to 50 years in prison for pandering in 1936. Frank Costello, the Luciano crime family's consigliere, rather than Genovese, the underboss at the time, became acting boss of the family at that point, then de facto boss when Luciano's appeal of his conviction was denied in 1937.

Genovese fled to Italy in 1937 to avoid prosecution for a 1934 murder. He returned to the United States in 1945, at which point he still faced trial for murder. That case was dismissed in 1946, however, after the two corroborating witnesses against him were murdered, one while in jail in protective custody.

Genovese believed that he, not Costello, should be Luciano's replacement; however neither Costello nor Willie Moretti, the underboss at the time, were willing to step aside. Costello later chose Genovese to serve as underboss after Moretti's murder in 1951. Costello also, by some accounts, appointed Catena to serve as the underboss for the family's interests in New Jersey.

Genovese was not, however, satisfied with being Costello's subordinate and made plans to eliminate him. While Catena was friends with Costello, he stayed out of the fray when he saw signs of disaffection with Costello within the family. When Costello retired from leadership in 1957 after Vincent Gigante's failed assassination attempt against him, Catena not only remained in place, but accompanied Genovese to the Apalachin Meeting later in 1957.

Genovese was indicted on federal drug trafficking charges in 1958 and sentenced to fifteen years in prison in 1959. At this point, as Genovese continued to attempt to run his family's business from prison, Catena formed a "Committee/Ruling Panel" with longtime captains Michele "Big Mike" Miranda and Thomas "Tommy Ryan" Eboli, to run the family on a day-to-day basis. Leadership of the family ultimately passed to Vincent Gigante.

== Political influence ==
Catena cultivated close relations with Newark City officials and with members of the State Legislature. Catena's ties to New Jersey politicians prompted investigations by law enforcement that ultimately led to his imprisonment for his refusal to testify before the New Jersey State Commission of Investigation.

In 1967 Governor Richard J. Hughes proposed creation of a State Commission of Investigation, to legalize wiretapping, and to permit certain witnesses in organized crime cases to receive immunity from prosecution. These bills provoked an immediate response from one legislator. Assemblyman C. Richard Fiore, who represented the North Ward of Newark and was chairman of the Assembly Committee on Law and Public Safety. Asked by an aide to the Senator sponsoring the bills to assist in joint consideration of them, Fiore allegedly complained that the grand jury and the Senate investigations were putting “too much pressure” on the mob and "Jerry is unhappy about it." When asked whether he was referring to Jerry Catena, he affirmed that he was. He went on to say that he had become chairman of the Assembly crime committee to relieve the pressure. "I’ve got to stop these kinds of things."

At a hearing on these bills in September 1968 two former special United States Attorneys from the Justice Department's organized crime division testified that "official corruption in New Jersey is so bad that organized crime can get almost anything it desires" and that "there is official corruption at all levels in New Jersey." Those remarks were echoed by Assistant Attorney General William J. Brennan 3d, who stated that some legislators, whom he declined to identify, were "entirely too comfortable with members of organized crime" and that the state has been portrayed as a playground for Mafia racketeers.

== Imprisonment for contempt ==
The Legislature established the State Commission of Investigation in 1969. That same year, when Catena was subpoenaed to testify before it, the Commission offered him use immunity in order to deny him the right to invoke the Fifth Amendment protection against self-incrimination. Catena nonetheless invoked the Fifth Amendment approximately eighty times.

Catena and another recalcitrant witness, Angelo Bruno, the boss of the Philadelphia crime family, were sentenced to indefinite terms of imprisonment until they withdrew their Fifth Amendment objections and answered the Commission's questions. Catena petitioned for a writ of habeas corpus, arguing that an offer of "use," rather than "transactional," immunity was not enough to strip him of his Fifth Amendment right to refuse to answer questions that might tend to incriminate him. The District Court denied the petition but the Third Circuit reversed and ordered that the writ of habeas corpus be granted.

Before he could be released the United States Supreme Court intervened by granting the government's petition for stay of the Third Circuit's decision on Catena's appeal and denying both Catena's and Bruno's applications for release on bail pending further appellate review. Both prisoners remained incarcerated.

In the meantime, two other witnesses who had also refused to answer the Commission's questions were making these same Fifth Amendment arguments to the Supreme Court on appeal from an adverse decision by the New Jersey Supreme Court. The Supreme Court likewise rejected their claims, holding that an offer of use immunity was enough to force those witnesses to answer questions about their criminal activities. The Supreme Court rejected Catena's Fifth Amendment claims shortly thereafter.

Even after he lost his Fifth Amendment challenge Catena continued to argue on remand to the Third Circuit that the statute establishing the Commission was unconstitutional on the further ground that it denied him the right to cross-examine other witnesses or call witnesses of his own. The Third Circuit rejected that argument as well.

Catena continued to refuse to answer the Commission's questions after exhausting these constitutional challenges. He stated instead that he would "stay in jail for the rest of my life" and they would have to carry him out "feet first" before he informed on anyone.

Catena was not, however, resigned to remaining in prison for the rest of his life; instead he demanded release on the ground that his imprisonment had lost any usefulness as a means of coercing him to answer questions and therefore served only as an unlawful form of punishment without trial. The trial court agreed and ordered him released.

The New Jersey Supreme Court, however, disagreed, holding that Catena had not carried his burden of proof that his imprisonment had lost its coercive impact and had become punitive. It remanded the case to the trial court to allow Catena to present evidence in support of his other claims (1) that the subpoena compelling him to appear before the Committee was based on illegally obtained information and (2) that the questions he refused to answer were derived from unlawful electronic surveillance.

When Catena's case came up for hearing before the trial court the court chose to also reconsider whether continued imprisonment of Catena would serve any coercive purpose. The court ruled, based on Catena's age and health, affidavits from Catena and his attorneys, testimony from Catena's wife and daughters, and Catena's steadfast refusal to testify, that Catena's continued imprisonment had become punitive and that he should be released. The New Jersey Supreme Court again reversed the trial court, ruling that the record evidence was still inadequate, mainly because Catena had not presented live testimony from witnesses who could be cross-examined, and remanded the case once again for further proceedings.

When Catena's request for release came before the trial court for the third time, Catena, his doctor, and his attorneys testified. The trial court reached the same conclusions as before for the same reasons. The New Jersey Supreme Court, making its own factual findings based on the trial court's evidentiary record, agreed and ordered Catena released.

== Retirement and death ==
Catena was the underboss in charge of the Genovese crime family's New Jersey rackets at the time he was sent to prison in 1970 for refusing to testify before the New Jersey State Commission of Investigation. Much had changed, however, during the five years that he spent in Yardville State Prison). Other New York crime families, in particular the Gambino crime family, increased their presence in New Jersey, which had formerly been dominated by the Genovese crime family. While Catena had been consulted on Genovese family business while imprisoned, others, including Richie Boiardo, took over day-to-day operations.

Some observers believed at the time that Catena was not keen on resuming his old role as underboss when he was released from prison. His health had, in fact, suffered during his years in prison; he was also quite wealthy from his legitimate businesses, his earnings as a highly-placed member of the Genovese crime family, and the skim from Las Vegas. In addition, one of the other leaders of the Genovese family, Thomas Eboli, had been murdered in 1972, possibly by killers dispatched by Carlo Gambino, then the most powerful of all of the bosses of the Five Families in New York.

Catena did, in fact, retire to Boca Raton, Florida, and later Punta Gorda, Florida, where he lived until his death of natural causes on April 23, 2000, at the age of 98. Fortune Magazine ranked him as the fourth richest member of organized crime in 1986.

== Personal life ==
He was married to Catherine McNally and was the father to Patricia, Geraldine, Donna, Vicki and Richard.

American Mafia
Preceded by Vito Genovese	Genovese crime family Underboss; 1957-1972	Succeeded by Carmine "Little Eli" Zeccardi
