= Lawrence Ricci =

Alleged American mobster (1945-2005)

Lawrence A. Ricci (June 17, 1945 – October 2005) was a reputed Genovese crime family acting capo.

Officially a dairy products salesman, Ricci was allegedly a major mob figure. In 1979, Ricci was sentenced to prison for attempting to extort $4,800 from a Parsippany, New Jersey restaurant owner.

In February 2005, Ricci was charged with wire fraud and extortion. Using his alleged control of an International Longshoremen’s Association Newark, New Jersey Local 1235, Ricci was accused of diverting hundreds of thousands of dollars to the Cosa Nostra from a medical fund for longshoremen. Ricci allegedly embezzled the money by steering a union pharmaceutical contract to a company with known Mafia ties. The Genovese and Gambino crime families netted over $400,000 and Ricci received $70,000. The trial began in mid-September. On October 7, 2005, Ricci failed to show up in court. The judge issued an arrest warrant for Ricci and the trial continued. On November 7, 2005, the absent Ricci and his two co-defendants—union Vice President Arthur Coffey and union assistant general organizer Harold Daggett—were acquitted on all counts.

On November 30, 2005, a patron complained about a foul odor and flies around a car at the Huck Finn Diner in Union, New Jersey. The car had been parked at the diner for the last six weeks. The restaurant manager called the police, who discovered the decomposing body of Lawrence Ricci in the trunk; he had been shot. There was speculation that the Genovese family killed Ricci during his trial because he had refused to accept a plea bargain and a prison sentence. A law enforcement official was also quoted as saying the slaying resulted from an unrelated power struggle in Ricci's mob crew.

In March 2007, federal authorities linked Genovese member Michael Coppola to the Ricci murder. However, no charges have been filed against Coppola.
