= Louis Manna =

American mobster (born 1929)

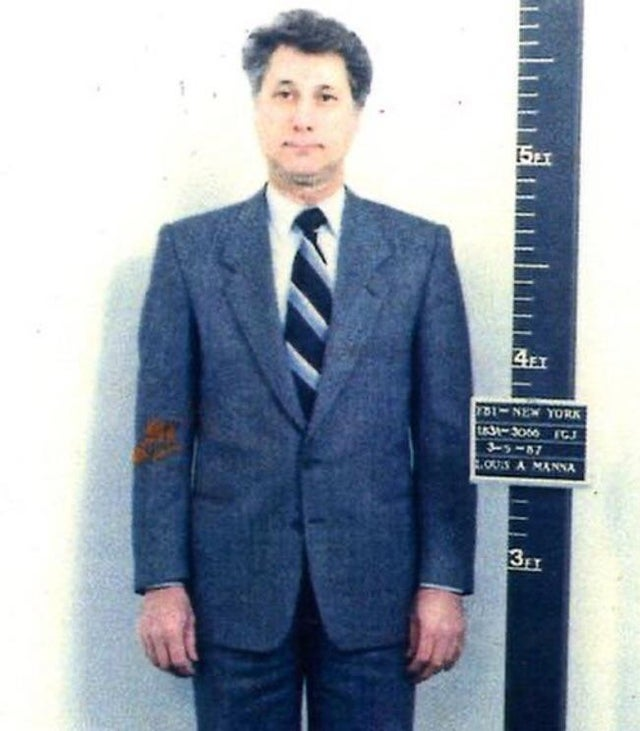
- Manna's mugshot, 1987
- Born: Louis Anthony Manna; December 2, 1929 (age 96); Hoboken, New Jersey, U.S.
- Other name: "Bobby"
- Occupation: Mobster
- Allegiance: Genovese crime family
- Convictions: Racketeering (1989) conspiring to murder (1989)
- Penalty: 80 years' imprisonment

Louis Anthony "Bobby" Manna (born December 2, 1929) is an American mobster who served as consigliere of the Genovese crime family under the regime of Vincent “Chin” Gigante, operating primarily out of Hoboken, New Jersey, Manna served his tenure as the consigliere from between 1981 until 1989. In June 1989, Manna was convicted of conspiring to murder 3 people and racketeering, in April 2025, Manna was released from prison after serving over 35 years in prison, after serving stints in Kansas City Federal Penitentiary and Rochester Federal Medical Center.

== Genovese family ==
Manna was born and raised in Hoboken, New Jersey. He became a close associate of family boss Vincent "the Chin" Gigante; he rented an apartment in Greenwich Village, New York to be close to Gigante's headquarters at the Triangle Social Club. It is noted that he would also report to Tony Salerno beside Gigante. However, Manna's power base was in New Jersey. He is the brother-in-law of Genovese crime family mob associate Gerald Dirazzo. According to the New Jersey district court, Manna's crimes date back to 1952 when he and others assaulted a man for attempting to recruit members to a rival union. He supervised four caporegimes while also serving as consigliere. He ran his personal criminal operations out of an Italian eatery called Casella's at 615 First Street in Hoboken, New Jersey. Manna became the lead man for the Genovese family in discussions with the Gambino crime family on how to equitably divide up that area.

In July 1972, Manna was convicted of contempt, after he had refused to testify before a public commission hearing, and he served a 5-year sentence, being released in 1977.

== Gambino family ==
In 1986, Manna began pushing the Genovese family to murder John Gotti, the new boss of the Gambino family. A Gambino capo, Gotti had arranged the murder of Gambino boss, Paul Castellano, on December 16, 1985, and took control of the Gambino family without the approval of The Commission. Manna was especially unhappy about Gotti's unsanctioned coup against Castellano. In addition, Gotti wanted to take the lucrative South Jersey holdings that used to belong to the Philadelphia crime family and leave the less desirable North Jersey territory to the Genovese family.

== Conviction ==
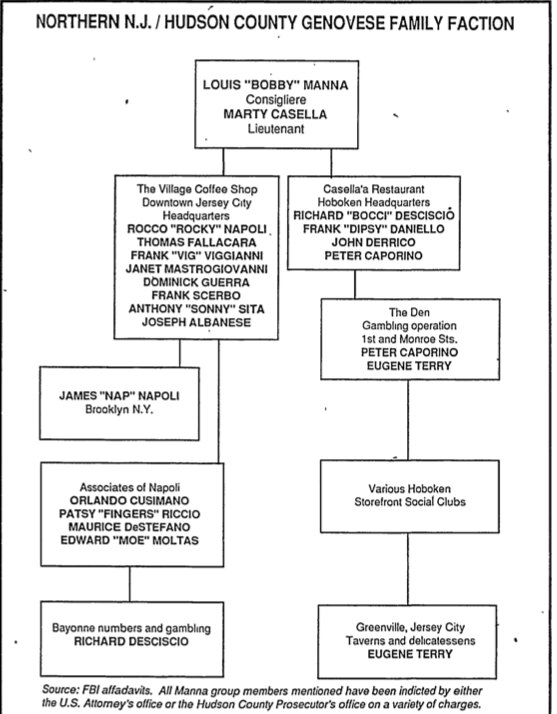
FBI chart of the Northern N.J./Hudson County Genovese family faction

Between August 1987 and January 1988, the Federal Bureau of Investigation recorded 12 conversations in which Manna and other Genovese mobsters discussed murdering John Gotti, Gene Gotti, and New York contractor Irwin Schiff. While discussing the John Gotti murder, Manna advised the hitman to wear a disguise as the target area was fairly open. On August 8, 1987, Schiff was shot in the head while dining in a Manhattan restaurant. Manna was later indicted and on June 26, 1989, Manna was convicted of conspiring to murder John Gotti, Gene Gotti, and Irwin Schiff in aid of racketeering. On September 26, 1989, Judge Maryanne Trump-Barry sentenced Manna to 80 years in federal prison.

It was revealed by the FBI in 2004 that prior to Manna's sentencing, he was involved in a murder plot of Judge Maryanne Trump-Barry, United States Attorney Samuel A. Alito, and Chief Prosecutor Michael Chertoff.

In December 2020, the 91-year old Manna requested compassionate release, but was denied. He was denied release again in November 2021.

As of December 2021, Manna is incarcerated at the Federal Medical Center (FMC) in Rochester, Minnesota. His projected release date is November 7, 2054.

In April 2025, Manna was released on compassionate release at the age of 95. He was suffering from several ailments including lung cancer, Parkinson's disease, low blood pressure, and a stroke.

American Mafia
| Preceded by Louis "Bobby" Manna | Genovese crime family Consigliere; 1981–1990 | Succeeded by James Ida |
