= 1986 in organized crime =

In 1986, a number of events took place in organized crime.

== Events ==
- According to the government reports, it is estimated there are 2,500 members of the "La Cosa Nostra" and thousands of associate members. Reports also are said to include the Italian-American Mafia as the largest organized crime group in the United States and continues to hold dominance over the National Crime Syndicate, despite the increasing numbers of street gangs and other organizations of non-Italian or Sicilian ethnicity.
- Robert "DiB" DiBernardo, Gambino crime family caporegime involved in pornography operations, is murdered.
- Frank DeCicco, capo and associate of Gambino crime family leader Paul Castellano, who eventually betrayed Castellano to John Gotti, is murdered (carbomb).
- Peter "Little Pete" Tambone, a drug trafficker and former member of the Gambino crime family, is reinstated by John Gotti. Tambone had been previously banished from the crime family by former leader Paul Castellano after his participation in the (Angelo)Ruggerio-(Gene)Gotti heroin operation.
- January 21 – Resulting in an extensive five-year Federal Bureau of Investigation (FBI) investigation, Chicago Outfit members, boss Joseph "Joey Doves" Aiuppa, underboss John "Jackie the Lackey" Cerone, and capos Angelo J. "The Hook" LaPietra and Joseph "Joey The Clown" Lombardo are convicted by a U.S. District Court in Kansas City, Missouri for conspiring along with the Cleveland, Milwaukee, and Kansas City crime families to embezzle loans from the International Brotherhood of Teamsters' Central States Pension Fund.
- February 10 – Diamond merchant Israel Greenwald disappears. His body is later discovered in April 2005 by the FBI in a makeshift grave with two bullets lodged in his skull. He was killed by Louis Eppolito and Stephen Caracappa, on the orders of Lucchese crime family underboss Anthony "Gaspipe" Casso.
- February 10 – Start of the Maxi Trial against Cosa Nostra in Palermo. The trial took place next to the Ucciardone (the Palermo prison) in a bunker specially built to try the defendants. A total of 474 defendants were facing charges, although 119 of them were to be tried in absentia as they were fugitives. (Salvatore Riina and Michele Greco were among these absent defendants.) Amongst those present were Luciano Leggio, Riina's predecessor, who acted as his own lawyer, and also Giuseppe "Pippo" Calò. Most of the crucial evidence came from Tommaso Buscetta a mafioso captured in 1982 in Brazil. He had lost many relatives during the Mafia war, including two sons, as well as many allies such as Stefano Bontade and Salvatore Inzerillo. He decided to cooperate with the Sicilian magistrates. The Corleonesi continued its vendetta against Buscetta by killing several more of his relatives. Testifying against the Corleonesi was the only way to avenge his murdered family and friends. The information that Buscetta had given the investigative judges Giovanni Falcone and Paolo Borsellino allowed a new understanding to how the Mafia functioned and how the clandestine groups of hierarchy in the Sicilian Cupola (the Sicilian Mafia Commission) actually agreed on policy and business. For the first time the Mafia had been prosecuted as an entity rather than a collection of individual crimes. Known as the Buscetta theorem it showed that Cosa Nostra was a single hierarchical organisation ruled by a commission and that its leaders could be held responsible for criminal acts that were committed to benefit the organisation.
- February 20 – Michele Greco, the boss of the Ciaculli Mafia family and "chairman" of the Sicilian Mafia Commission, arrested and charged in the 1986 Maxi Trial for the murder of Italian anti-Mafia magistrate Rocco Chinnici.
- March 19 – Michele Sindona is convicted of murder. The following day he dies in his prison cell after drinking a cup of poisoned coffee.
- March 20 – Anthony "Fat Tony" Salerno, "front boss" of the Genovese crime family, along with 14 other Genovese members, are indicted on several charges including conspiracy, racketeering and extortion. Former Salerno soldier Vincent Cafaro would turn informant and explained that after Salerno suffered a stroke in 1981, he was delegated to functioning as a figurehead boss to keep the pressure off the official boss Vincent Gigante. Cafaro also explained that caporegimes Vincent DiNapoli and Liborio Bellomo removed caporegime Peter DeFeo and soldier Alexander Morelli from the District Council of Carpenters rackets, and DiNapoli and Bellomo went on to control hiring at the Jacob Javits Center as well as the drywall cartel. Cafaro would go on to testify at the trials of Gambino boss John Gotti.
- April 2 – Tommaso Buscetta and Salvatore Contorno arrive from the United States to testify in the Maxi Trial in Palermo
- June 13 – The entire leadership of the Colombo crime family, boss Carmine "Junior" Persico, underboss Gennaro "Jerry Lang" Langella, former acting boss/capo Anthony "Scappy" Scarpati, capos Alphonse "Little Allie Boy" Persico, Andrew "Andy Mush" Russo, Dominic "Little Dom" Cataldo, John "Jackie" DeRoss, soldier Frank "The Beast" Falanga and associate Hugh "Apples" McIntosh are convicted under the Racketeer Influenced and Corrupt Organizations Act (RICO) of conspiracy, extortion, and bribery in the "Colombo Case". The U.S. Attorney's Office filed a civil RICO complaint against family members soon after the trial, marking the first civil RICO complaint filed against a crime family as an enterprise, including labor unions under their control.
- June 14 – Anthony "Tony," "The Ant" Spilotro and his brother Michael Spilotro are beaten to death and buried in a cornfield in Morocco, Indiana, their bodies being found on June 23. Spilotro had been sent to Las Vegas by the Chicago Outfit as its "Representato," or, "Outside Man," to protect its casino skimming operations and, "Inside Man." But, after gaining much too media attention and being blacklisted by the casinos, as well as allegedly having an affair with the wife of Outfit associate and "Inside Man" Frank "Lefty" Rosenthal, it was decided that Anthony was a liability, and is murdered on the orders of the new Chicago Outfit boss, Joseph "Joe Negal" Ferriola.
- June 23 – After being largely controlled by the Genovese crime family for almost three decades under Anthony "Tony Pro" Provenzano, U.S. District Court Judge Harold A. Ackerman is named as a trustee to oversee Teamsters Local 560.
- July 24 – Genovese crime family soldier Joseph "Joe Glitz" Galizia and Russian mobsters Igor Roizman, Igor Porotsky, and Sheldon Levine are indicted after a six-month investigation by the Federal Organized Crime Strike Force for the Eastern District of New York. The men were charged with operating a scam that evaded over $5 million in Federal gasoline excise taxes.
- September – The Commission Case goes to trial in Manhattan. The heads of the five New York Families called the Commission are all charged and brought to trial for the first time. There were 11 defendants indicted, but only eight make it to trial. The defendants are Genovese crime family boss (front boss) Anthony "Fat Tony" Salerno, Lucchese crime family boss Antonio "Tony Ducks" Corallo, Lucchese underboss Salvatore "Tom Mix" Santoro, Lucchese consigliere Christopher "Christie Tick" Furnari, Colombo crime family boss Carmine "Junior" Persico, Colombo acting boss/underboss Gennaro "Jerry Lang" Langella, Colombo soldier Ralph Scopo and Bonanno crime family soldier Anthony "Bruno" Indelicato. Defendant Philip "Rusty" Rastelli, Bonanno crime family boss was severed from the trial, as he was subsequently indicted in another RICO case along with his underboss Joseph "Big Joey" Massino. Gambino crime family underboss Aniello "Mr. Neil" Dellacroce died of brain cancer Dec 2, 1985. Gambino crime Family boss Paul "Big Pauly" Castellano and his new underboss Tommy Bilotti were assassinated in front of Sparks Steak House in Manhattan Dec. 16, 1985.
- September 25 – Gambino crime family leader John "Johnny Boy" Gotti is brought to trial for the first time and charged with crimes over an 18-year period including illegal gambling, loan-sharking, armed robbery, and murder.
- October 24 – Members of the Colombo crime family including Colombo Family boss Carmine "Junior" Persico, two former leaders, four capos, four other members and two associates are charged with involvement in widespread racketeering and other criminal activities.
- October 31 – Philadelphia mobster Nicodemo Scarfo is indicted with several others by a New Jersey grand jury for racketeering, loansharking, illegal gambling, and extortion.
- November 5 – Harry Davidoff, Vice President of the Lucchese crime family-controlled IBT Local 851, is convicted under the RICO Act for conspiracy (as well as being charged with conspiracy and extortion under the Hobbs Act) at a jury trial in the Eastern District of New York (EDNY). This would be the first in a series of trials, in which a federal investigation focused on the control of the air freight industry at JFK International Airport by New York's Five Families, using its influence within the Teamsters Union.
- October 10 – During the Davidoff trial, Lucchese capo Paul Vario, with soldiers Frank Manzo and Pasquale Raucci plead guilty of conspiracy and convicted under the RICO Act.
- November 18 – Among various members and associates of the Colombo Crime family, Colombo boss Carmine "Junior" Persico is sentenced to 39 years' imprisonment for racketeering along with underboss Gennaro "Jerry Lang" Langella who receives a 65-year prison sentence.
- November 19 – All 8 defendants are found guilty on all RICO counts-151 of them. They will be sentenced soon.
- November 24 – Genovese crime family "front boss" Anthony "Fat Tony" Salerno, with three other Genovese members are indicted for labor racketeering charges concerning "exerting influence and control over Jackie Presser's selection as General President for the scandal-plagued 1.7 million member union (IBT) in 1983 and then influencing his decisions and acts to benefit the mob."
- December 1 – Sicilian mafioso Gaetano "Tommy" Mazzara, a Union Township, Union County, New Jersey pizzeria owner recently arrested for drug trafficking in connection to the Pizza Connection, is murdered in Brooklyn. His body, stuffed in a garbage bag, is found on a street corner the following day.

== Arts and literature ==
- John Woo's A Better Tomorrow (film) starring Lung Ti, Yun-Fat Chow and Emily Chu is released.
- Mafia Princess (television movie) starring Susan Lucci, Kathleen Widdoes and Tony Curtis.

== Deaths ==
- April 13 – Frank DeCicco, associate of Paul Castellano
- June 14 – Anthony Spilotro "The Ant", Las Vegas mobster and Chicago Outfit member
- June 14 – Michael Spilotro, Chicago Outfit associate and brother of Anthony Spilotro
- December 1 – Gaetano Mazzara "Tommy", New York businessman and cousin of Frank Castronovo involved in the Pizza Connection
