= 116th Street Crew =

Faction of the Genovese crime family

- Founded: c. 1890s; 135 years ago
- Founders: Morello crime family
- Founding location: New York City, New York, United States
- Years active: c. 1890s–present
- Territory: Upper Manhattan and the Bronx
- Ethnicity: Italians as "made men" and other ethnicities as associates
- Activities: Racketeering, murder, extortion, illegal gambling, loansharking, and bookmaking
- Allies: Bonanno; Colombo; Gambino; Lucchese; Purple Gang
- Rivals: Various gangs in Manhattan and the Bronx, including their allies

The 116th Street Crew, also known as the Uptown Crew, is a faction of the Genovese crime family. In the early 1960s, Anthony Salerno became the caporegime of the 116th Street Crew and one of the most powerful captains in the Genovese family. Salerno based the crew in the Palma Boys Social Club located at 416 East 115th Street in East Harlem, Manhattan. By the late 1970s and early 1980s, the 116th Street Crew had absorbed and initiated many former members of the vicious East Harlem Purple Gang, an Italian-American murder for hire and drug trafficking gang operating in 1970s Italian Harlem and acting generally independently of the Mafia.

== History ==
=== The 116th Street Mob ===
In the early 1890s, a group of four brothers (Giuseppe Morello, and his half-brothers Nicholo, Vincenzo and Ciro Terranova) arrived in New York City from Corleone, Sicily. The Morello-Terranova brothers soon started taking over the growing Little Italy in East Harlem, by using the black hand technique of extorting small business and running illegal gambling operations. The group became known as the 116th Street Mob (or Morello gang). With their increasing power the Morello's sought to control Lower Manhattan's Little Italy. The Little Italy in lower Manhattan was under the control of Ignazio "Lupo the Wolf" Saietta, Before a gang war erupted, the two sides decided on joining forces. Giuseppe Morello became the Capo di tutti capi (or boss of bosses), but before long he and Ignazio Saietta were arrested and charged with counterfeiting in 1910.

In February 1912, Fortunato "Charles" Lo Monte was promoted to lead the Morello group in East Harlem after Giuseppe Morello was imprisoned. The Lo Monte brothers, along with the Terranova brothers and Morello brothers held meetings at a saloon at 227 E107th Street, run by Angelo Gagliano and Ippolito Greco. In 1914, Fortunato "Charles" Lo Monte was murdered on E108th Street, by three gunman Umberto Valente, Accursio Di Mino and Joseph Biondo, who were working for Toto D'Aquila. In May 1915, the Camorra leader in Harlem Giosue Gallucci was murdered this started the Mafia–Camorra War as both the Camorra and the Morrello gangs fought for control. Gaetano "Tommaso/Thomas" Lo Monte took control of the policy game in Harlem but murdered on October 13, 1915.

Nicholo Morello took over and became embroiled in the Mafia-Camorra War. This conflict was between the Sicilian Morello-Terranova family and Brooklyn Camorra gangs led by Pellegrino Morano. Each side wanted to completely control all the Italian gangs in New York City and across the United States. On September 7, 1916 Nicholas Terranova was murdered, giving the Camorra gangs the advantage. The next leaders of the Morello family were brothers Vincenzo and Ciro. They continued the war and within months police began arresting top members of the Camorra gangs. This allowed the Sicilians to maintain dominance and control over New York City and the remaining Camorra gangs joined forces with Sicilian gangs. Vincent continued operating from Brooklyn, and Ciro continued expanding his operations in East Harlem and The Bronx.

=== The Artichoke King ===
Ciro "The Artichoke King" Terranova controlled the 116th Street Crew during the prohibition era. In his later years, after being "encouraged" by younger gangsters to retire in 1935 and subsequently declaring bankruptcy and losing his Pelham Manor home to foreclosure, Terranova and his wife moved into the building long owned by the Morello-Terranova family at 338 East 116th Street (the headquarters of the Ignatz Florio Co-operative Association).

=== Coppola's policy racket ===
Michael "Trigger Mike" Coppola was a top lieutenant in the 116th Street Crew of Ciro Terranova. He took over the crew sometime between 1932 and 1936, after Terranova was "put on the shelf" (i.e. forced into retirement) by the new Luciano-Genovese-Costello regime of the Luciano crime family. Coppola was also supervising the illegal numbers racket that was once controlled by Dutch Schultz before his murder. The numbers racket controlled bookmaking and illegal gambling throughout Harlem and The South Bronx, making thousands of dollars a year.

When boss Vito Genovese was imprisoned in the late 1950s, various influential members began running the crime family through a ruling panel/committee. The panel consisted of acting/front boss Thomas "Tommy Ryan" Eboli, underboss Gerardo "Gerry" Catena and consigliere Michele "Big Mike" Miranda, while others served in the advisory capacity. Mike Coppola, an influential capo, also helped the panel. In the early 1960s, Mike Coppola was imprisoned on tax evasion charges and followed in the footsteps of his predecessor Ciro Terranova, being put on the shelf after his release from prison in 1963. Coppola later moved to South Florida and effectively retired. His crew, with his vast illegal interests went to Anthony Salerno.

=== Palma Boys crew ===
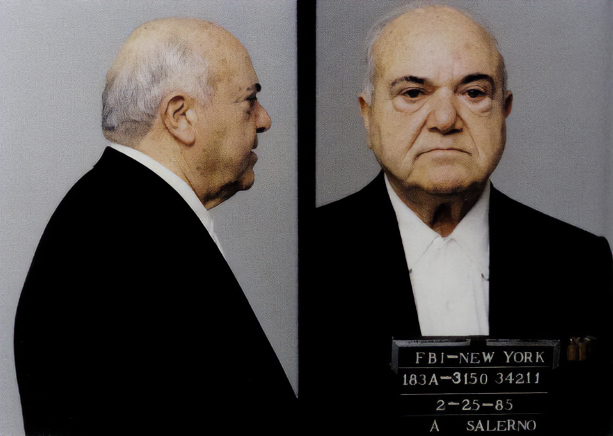
Anthony Salerno

Anthony "Fat Tony" Salerno started as a soldier in the 1930s under capo "Trigger Mike" Coppola. As the years went by, Salerno worked his way up the ranks of the crew and the crime family, controlling his own lucrative gambling and loansharking operations. In the early 1960s, his capo Coppola was imprisoned on tax evasion charges and demoted in rank. The crew then split, allowing Coppola's top lieutenants to break up his vast illegal interests that included his numbers empire. Salerno based the 116th Street Crew from the Palma Boys Social Club located at 416 East 115th Street in East Harlem.

Salerno, and his brother Cirino (known as "Charles" or "Charlie Speed") led the crew, operating in Italian Harlem and the Bronx. The Salerno brothers oversaw a multimillion-dollar gambling racket based in East Harlem that expanded into the South Bronx. Salerno's gambling empire included numbers, bookmaking and floating dice games. Even when the East Harlem neighborhood went from a predominantly Italian to a predominantly black neighborhood, Salerno managed to hold onto their interests and employ over 200 people in their street rackets.

FBI surveillance photo in the 1980s of the Palma Boys Social Club

Salerno was a highly respected and feared gangster, and a well-known New York Mafia powerhouse who continued to rise through the ranks of the Genovese crime family becoming consigliere from 1972–75, underboss in 1975, and eventually the acting–front boss from 1981-86. In the late 1970s, the FBI managed to place a listening device in his East Harlem headquarters, the Palma Boys Social Club. By the early 1980s, Salerno had been caught on the bug discussing crime family affairs and business with various members, including top underlings such as capo Matthew "Matty the Horse" Ianniello, Salerno driver and right-hand-man Vincent "Fish" Cafaro, and even Lucchese crime family boss Anthony "Tony Ducks" Corallo, whose own Jaguar, where Corallo conducted much of his affairs, had also been bugged. In February 1985, the information obtained through the FBI bug was used to eventually indict Salerno and the bosses of New York's Five Families, who sat on The Commission. The Mafia Commission Trial began in September 1986 and ended in November. Tony Salerno, along with five other New York bosses were convicted under the RICO statute and sentenced to 100 years in prison in January 1987.

=== Bellomo era ===
Liborio "Barney" Bellomo took over the crew in the early 1980s, operating in Harlem and the Bronx. In the early 1990s, Bellomo was promoted to street boss for imprisoned boss Vincent "The Chin" Gigante. On July 27, 1992, former capo Anthony Salerno died in prison. Bellomo was imprisoned, and various acting leaders such as Frank "Farby" Serpico and Ernest "Ernie" Muscarella controlled the crew.

== Historical leadership ==
=== Caporegimes ===
- c. 1893–1909 – Giuseppe "the Clutch Hand" Morello – also served as "Capo di tutti capi" from 1898–1909 until he was imprisoned.
- 1910–1916 – Nicholas "Nick Morello" Terranova – murdered on September 7, 1916.
- 1916–1932 – Ciro "The Artichoke King" Terranova – controlled the artichoke racket; retires in 1932, died in 1938.
- 1932–1965 – Michael "Trigger Mike" Coppola – controlled "numbers racket", imprisoned in 1962, and died in 1966.
  - Acting 1960 – Benjamin "Benny the Bum" DeMartino
  - Acting 1960–1965 – Philip "Benny Squint" Lombardo – when Coppola began staying in Florida for longer vacations. Became official caporegime.
- 1965–1969 – Philip "Benny Squint" Lombardo – also served as family "Acting Boss" during 1965–1969, before becoming official boss
  - Acting 1965–1969 – Anthony "Fat Tony" Salerno – became official caporegime.
- 1969–1972 – Anthony "Fat Tony" Salerno – became Consigliere 1972-1975, then Underboss 1975-1980 and Street Boss 1981-1987. Imprisoned in 1987, during the Mafia Commission Trial and died on July 27, 1992.
  - Acting 1969–1972 – Cirino "Charlie Speed" Salerno – brother to Anthony Salerno
- 1972–1975 – Antonio "Buckaloo" Ferro – became Consigliere 1975–1978, then retires.
- 1975–1981 – Saverio "Sammy" Santora – promoted to Underboss in 1981-1986, died in 1987.
  - Acting 1977–1979 – Joseph "Joe Stretch" Stracci
  - Acting 1980–1981 –Ralph "Farby" Serpico
- 1982–1998 – Liborio "Barney" Bellomo – based the crew from East Harlem and East Bronx. Became "Acting Boss" 1990-1992, imprisoned 1996-2008, became official Boss.
  - Acting 1990–1998 – Ralph Coppola – murdered in 1998.
  - Acting 1998 – Frank "Farby" Serpico – became Street boss 1998-2002, died in 2002 of natural causes.
- 1998–2003 – Ernest "Ernie" Muscarella – became Street boss 2002-2003, then imprisoned 2003-2008.
  - Acting 2002 – Pasquale DeLuca – demoted
  - Acting 2002–2003 – Louis Moscatiello – imprisoned and died.
  - Acting 2003 – Arthur "Artie" Nigro – became Street boss in 2003-2006, imprisoned 2006-2010, sentenced to life in prison in 2015.
- 2003–present – Pasquale "Uncle Patty" Falcetti – imprisoned 2014-2017
  - Acting 2015–present – Michael "Hippy" Zanfardino

== Former members ==
- Saverio "Sammy Black" Santora (June 6, 1935 – May 28, 1987) former capo of 116th Street crew and underboss of the family. In the late 1970s, Santora became caporegime of Antonio "Buckaloo" Ferro's 116th Street crew operating from the East Harlem section of Manhattan. In early 1980s, Santora became Underboss of the family and his protégé Liborio Bellomo became capo of his crew. Santora served as Underboss until his death on May 28, 1987.

== Government informants and witnesses ==
- Vincent "Fish" Cafaro – was Tony Salerno's right-hand man, became a co-operating witness in 1986.
