= Peter DeFeo =

American mobster (1902–1993)

Peter DeFeo (March 4, 1902 – April 6, 1993), also known as "Philie Aquilino", was a New York mobster who became a caporegime with the Genovese crime family.

== Rise to power ==
He was born to Giovanni "John" DeFeo and Maria Giovanna "Jennie" Coluzzi, one of 10 children. Growing up in New York's Little Italy neighborhood, DeFeo joined the Luciano crime family under boss Frank Costello. When DeFeo became a made man, he entered a crew belonging to mobster Mike Miranda that operated in Lower Manhattan and Brooklyn. DeFeo soon aligned himself with capo Vito Genovese, who would depose Costello as boss in the late 1950s. When Genovese went to prison in 1959, DeFeo served under acting boss Thomas "Tommy Ryan" Eboli.

DeFeo was a member of Patty Ryan Eboli's crew, and would eventually become the crew's captain. DeFeo operated most of his businesses from the Alto Knights Social Club in Little Italy. However, he also conducted business from other social clubs and the Cuomo Cheese Corporation in Little Italy. DeFeo's top button men were Alexander "Black Alex" Morelli and Lorenzo "Larry Chappie" Brescio. DeFeo was one of the main bosses of the Lower East Side Italian lottery, and controlled bookmaking in the area.

== Carpenters' union rackets and extortion activities ==
DeFeo's crew was involved in the N.Y.C. District Council of Carpenters during the 1970s. Mobster Vincent Cafaro testified that DeFeo's interests in the Carpenters Union were represented by Morelli and Genovese associate Marcello Svedese, a union official with Local 17.

DeFeo's crew also extorted money from construction and construction-related trucking companies. As an example, DeFeo was receiving between $8,000 to $10,000 per year from P. Chimento Trucking during the 1980s. DeFeo also received payments from Ross Trucking, and controlled Pier 13 in Manhattan, which was known as "the Banana Pier".

== Later years ==
In 1974, DeFeo came into the news after the Ronald DeFeo Jr. murders in Amityville, New York — as it so happened, Ronald DeFeo, who had murdered his father, mother, two brothers and two sisters in their suburban home, was Peter DeFeo's grandnephew.

DeFeo's influence within the family began to wane when Greenwich Village-based mobster Vincent Gigante became the family's boss in 1981, succeeding Phillip "Benny Squint" Lombardo. DeFeo's crew was based in Little Italy, and the Genovese family's historic power bases were the Greenwich Village and East Harlem factions. East Harlem/Bronx-based capos Liborio Bellomo and Vincent DiNapoli whittled away much of DeFeo's power, especially in the family's construction and labor rackets, which at the time were the family's biggest moneymakers. In 1987, DeFeo and Bellomo got into a dispute over control over Carpenters Local 17 in the Bronx. To settle the dispute, consigliere Louis Manna gave the local to Bellomo.

Soon after the dispute with Bellomo, DeFeo retired from the family. On April 6, 1993, DeFeo died of natural causes at the age of 91.
