= Philip Lombardo =

American mobster (1908–1987)

- Born: October 6, 1908; New York City, U.S.
- Died: April 29, 1987 (aged 78); Hollywood, Florida, U.S.
- Other names: Benny Squint, Cockeyed Phil
- Occupation: Crime boss
- Predecessor: Vito Genovese
- Successor: Vincent Gigante
- Allegiance: Genovese crime family

Philip Lombardo (October 6, 1908 – April 29, 1987) also known as "Benny Squint" and "Cockeyed Phil", was an American mobster who served as the boss of the Genovese crime family from the late 1960s until the beginning of the 1980s. He succeeded Vito Genovese as Boss in 1969 and was succeeded by Vincent Gigante in 1981.

Lombardo began his career as a soldier on Michael "Trigger Mike" Coppola's powerful 116th Street Crew in the East Harlem section of New York. During the 1940s, Lombardo served a brief prison stretch for narcotics trafficking, his only imprisonment. Due to his thick eyeglasses, Lombardo earned the nickname "Benny Squint."

In 1959, family boss Vito Genovese was sent to prison. However, Genovese used a series of acting bosses to maintain control of the family from prison. His three acting bosses, or Ruling Panel, were Capo Michele Miranda, underboss Gerardo "Jerry" Catena, and acting boss Thomas "Tommy Ryan" Eboli. The trio panel was known to authorities but in 1962 former mobster turned government witness Joseph Valachi stated before a U.S. Senate subcommittee that Lombardo was also a part of this same panel. In that same year, Anthony Strollo disappeared and was presumed murdered. Strollo's role as a front or acting boss was given to Thomas Eboli. Eboli himself was later gunned down in 1972. It had been theorized that Commission chairman Carlo Gambino had orchestrated Eboli's murder in order to install his own candidate for Genovese boss in the form of Alphonse Frank "Funzi" Tieri who would replace Eboli as front boss shortly after Eboli's murder. However, according to FBI informant Vincent Cafaro, Lombardo had been boss since 1969 and had been using Eboli and Tieri as decoys to insulate himself from the FBI. In 1981, Tieri died and Lombardo stepped down as boss due to poor health, naming Vincent Gigante as his successor, while at the same time making Anthony "Fat Tony" Salerno the new front boss in order to disguise Gigante's transition into the new boss. This way the FBI would still not know who was really in charge and would continue to go after the wrong people, which they did, sentencing Salerno to 100 years in prison in 1986 in the Mafia Commission Trial.

Although Lombardo resided in Englewood, New Jersey, he spent his remaining winters in Hollywood, Florida. He made it clear that Gigante was to become the new boss, and Salerno would continue as the front boss. He was 78 years old and living in Florida when he died on April 29, 1987.

American Mafia
Preceded by Thomas Eboli as acting boss	Genovese crime family Effective boss 1965–1969	Succeeded by Himself as boss
Preceded by Vito "Don Vito" Genovese	Genovese crime family Boss; 1969–1980	Succeeded by Vincent "Chin" Gigante
