= Dominick Canterino =

American mobster

Dominick "Baldy Dom" Canterino (Born January 4, 1929 – June, 1990) was a caporegime in the Genovese crime family.

He was born to first-generation Italian immigrants from Perugia, Italy. A Genovese captain from Bensonhurst who ran the family's Greenwich Village Crew, Canterino was a regular at Sullivan Street's Triangle Social Club, the de facto headquarters of the Genovese family. Federal Bureau of Investigation (FBI) surveillance regularly spotted Canterino at 3:00 am, driving Genovese boss Vincent Gigante to a friend's townhouse in Manhattan. Canterino once told the FBI that he worked as a dockworker and foreman, and once "did time as a thief". An FBI report also notes, "Canterino discussed the problems of being married and having a girlfriend on the side, which included having to split time between the two on holidays."

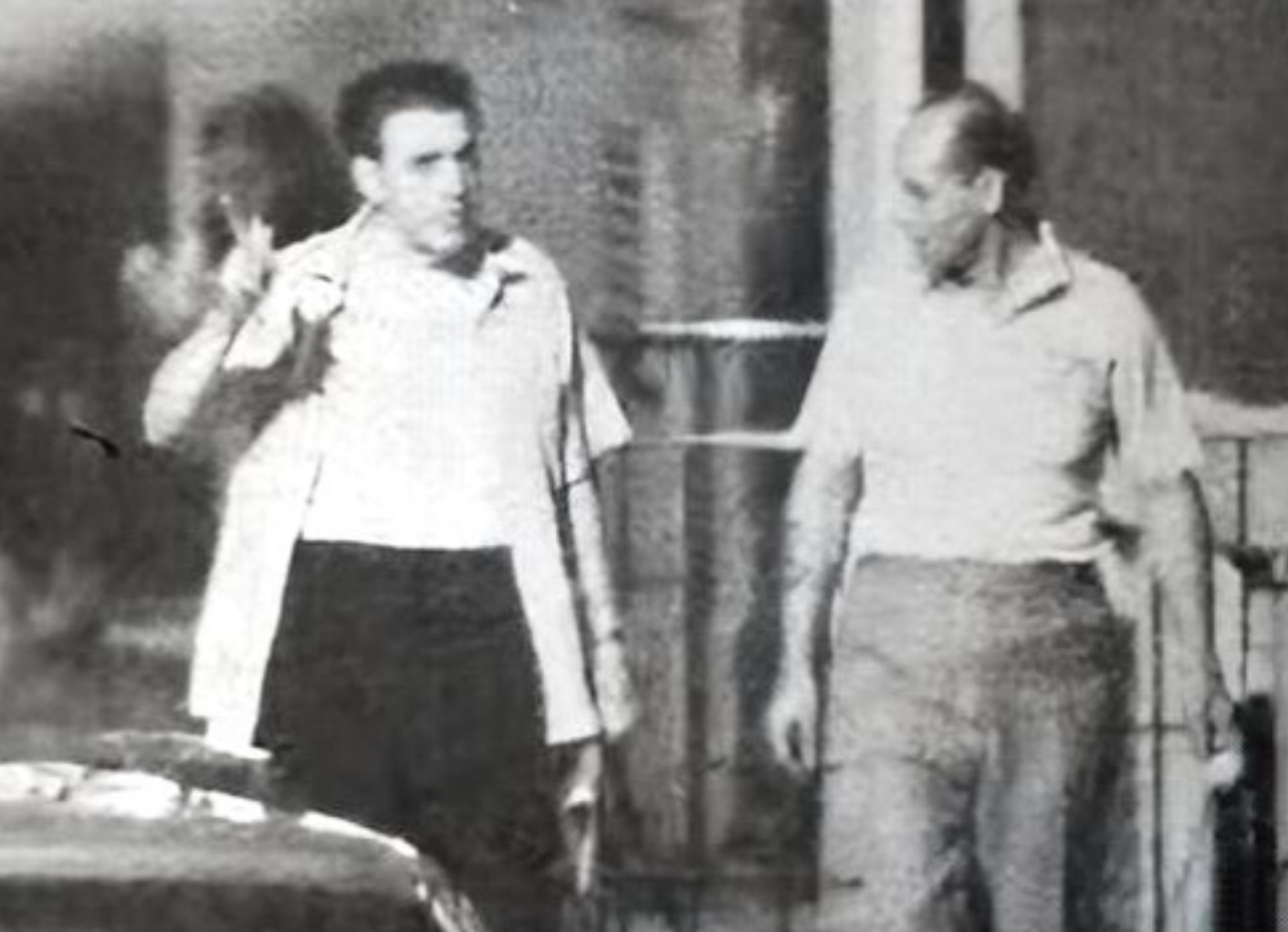
FBI surveillance photo of Vincent Gigante (left) and Dominick Canterino

In May 1988, Canterino, Morris Levy, president of Roulette Records, and Howard Fisher were convicted of conspiring to extort $1.25 million from Pennsylvania record producer Frank LaMonte in Camden, New Jersey. Canterino and Levy faced up to 40 years in jail. Canterino was sentenced to 12 years in prison and Levy to 10. Fisher's conviction was overturned.

On May 31, 1990, Canterino was indicted for racketeering in the Windows Case. Through their control of a local construction union, the Genoveses and three other New York crime families were fixing prices (and allocating work) that contractors offered the New York City Housing Authority for installing new thermal pane windows in city housing projects. The mob families grossed tens of millions of dollars from these contracts.

After the trial had begun, Canterino suffered a heart attack and was dropped from the case. Canterino retired and became inactive. He died June, 1990.
