= Mario Gigante =

American mobster (1923–2022)

- Born: November 4, 1923; New York City, New York, U.S.
- Died: March 10, 2022 (aged 98); Manhattan, New York, U.S.
- Other name: "The Shadow"
- Occupation: Mobster
- Children: 2
- Parent(s): Salvatore Gigante; Yolonda Gigante
- Relatives: Vincent, Louis, Pasquale and Ralph Gigante (brothers)
- Allegiance: Genovese crime family
- Convictions: Loan sharking (1983); Racketeering and extortion (1997)
- Penalty: Eight years' imprisonment (1983); later reduced to six years in 1989; Three years' imprisonment and fined $40,000 (1998)

Mario "The Shadow" Gigante (November 4, 1923 – March 10, 2022) was an American mobster in New York City who served as a caporegime for the Genovese crime family. He was the elder brother of late family boss Vincent "The Chin" Gigante.

== Biography ==
Gigante was born in Greenwich Village, Manhattan, to Salvatore Esposito Vulgo Gigante (April 26, 1900 – April 1979), a jewel engraver, and Yolonda Santasilia-Gigante (1902 – May 10, 1997), a seamstress and maternal niece of Dolores Santasilia. His parents and aunt were first-generation immigrants from Naples, Italy, and never learned the English language. Vincent and his extended family relatives settled in New York City and Westchester County including Connecticut and Massachusetts. He had four brothers, Vincent, Pasquale A. Gigante (October 18, 1921 – January 7, 1983) and Ralph Gigante (March 14, 1930 – 1994), who followed his brother Vincent into a life of organized crime. His last brother Louis Gigante became an ordained Roman Catholic priest at St. Athanasius Church in the South Bronx and city councilman. Gigante had two sons, Salvatore and Louis. His son Salvatore would follow him into a life of organized crime.

== Criminal career ==
Mario began his criminal life as a "made man", or full family member, in caporegime Vito Genovese's Greenwich Village crew. At that time, his brother Vincent was Genovese's chauffeur. During the power struggle between Genovese and then boss Frank Costello, the Gigante brothers were reportedly involved in several significant hits for Genovese. On August 12, 1957, the day after the attempted assassination of Costello, New York Police Department (NYPD) detectives were watching Vincent's house in Greenwich Village. When Mario drove up, detectives took him out of the car, and one tried to search him. Mario punched the detective and was arrested for assault. In court, the charge was reduced, and Mario paid a $25 fine.

By the 1970s, both Mario and Vincent were capos of their own crews. Neither brother had served significant prison time as they both kept low profiles. In the early 1980s, Vincent became the boss of the Genovese family. Mario rose to become one of the family's highest earners, involved in illegal gambling, loansharking, and other rackets. On January 25, 1975, Mario was indicted on charges of illegal gambling.

On June 16, 1983, Mario was convicted of loansharking and received an eight-year prison sentence. However, former New York Senator Alfonse D'Amato allegedly lobbied U.S. Attorney Rudolph Giuliani to reduce Mario's sentence. In 1989, Mario's sentence was reduced to six years in prison. Mob turncoat Vincent "Fish" Cafaro later alleged that he had approached power broker and attorney Roy Cohn to bribe a judge to lower Mario's sentence. Cafaro said he delivered a $175,000 "payoff" to Cohn in three installments, dropping off the final $50,000 with Cohn's law partner, Thomas Bolan. These allegations were investigated, but no charges were ever filed.

In June 1996, Gigante was indicted along with his son Salvatore and five others on charges of using threats and violence to keep potential competitors from entering the garbage collection business in Westchester, Orange, Rockland, Ulster and Dutchess Counties in New York, southwestern Connecticut and Mahwah and Edison in New Jersey. After Vincent was sent to prison in the summer of 1997, the family switched to a collective decision-making system. On October 1, 1997, Mario and other Genovese mobsters pleaded guilty to racketeering charges involving the trash hauling industry in Westchester, Rockland, and Orange counties in New York. According to prosecutors, the Genovese family maintained a "property rights" system in which they took control of local hauling firms and then insisted each firm had a "permanent right" to every customer. On one occasion, Mario enforced those rights by ordering the baseball bat beating of an uncooperative hauler.

Mario was released from prison in June 2001 after serving five years for extortion and racketeering in the solid waste hauling industry.

He died on March 10, 2022, at the age of 98.
