= Greenwich Village Crew =

Faction of the Genovese crime family

- Founded: 1920s
- Founder: Vito Genovese
- Founding location: Greenwich Village, Manhattan, New York City, New York, United States
- Years active: 1920s–present
- Territory: West Side, Lower Manhattan, the Bronx and Yonkers
- Ethnicity: Italians as "made men" and other ethnicities as associates
- Membership (est.): 30
- Activities: Racketeering, bookmaking, loansharking, extortion, gambling, conspiracy and labor racketeering
- Allies: The Bonanno, Colombo, Gambino and Lucchese crime families
- Rivals: Various gangs

The Greenwich Village Crew is a crew within the Genovese crime family, active in the Greenwich Village area of Manhattan. It was originally controlled by Don Vito Genovese from the early 1920s until his arrest in the late 1950s. In the early 1980s capo Vincent Gigante, was made the new boss of the Genovese crime family. He continued to operate from and with the Greenwich Village Crew members. Today the crew is still active, but after the death of Dominick Canterino, it is uncertain who is controlling the crew.

== Locations and activities ==
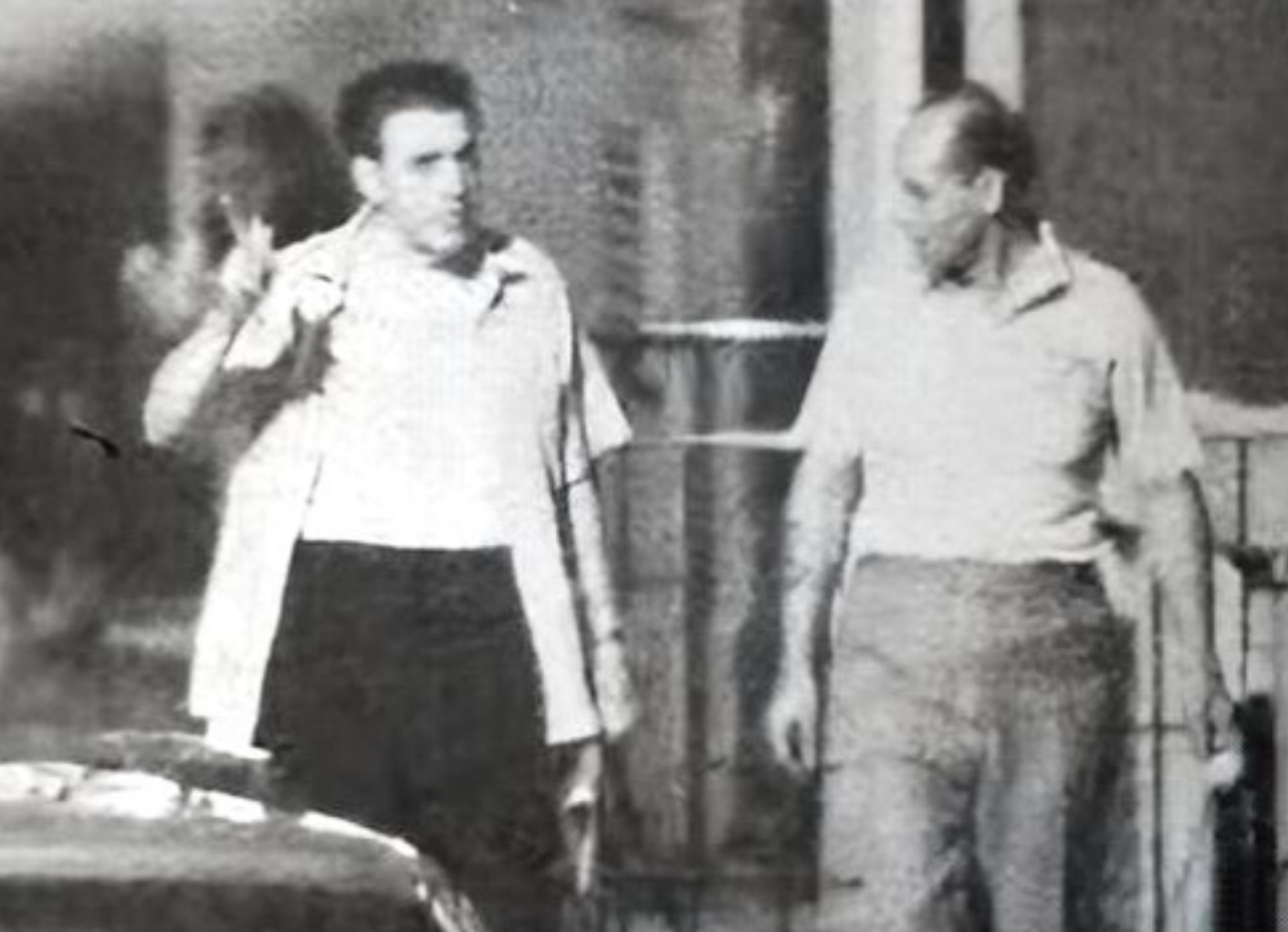
FBI surveillance photo of Vincent Gigante (left) and Dominick Canterino

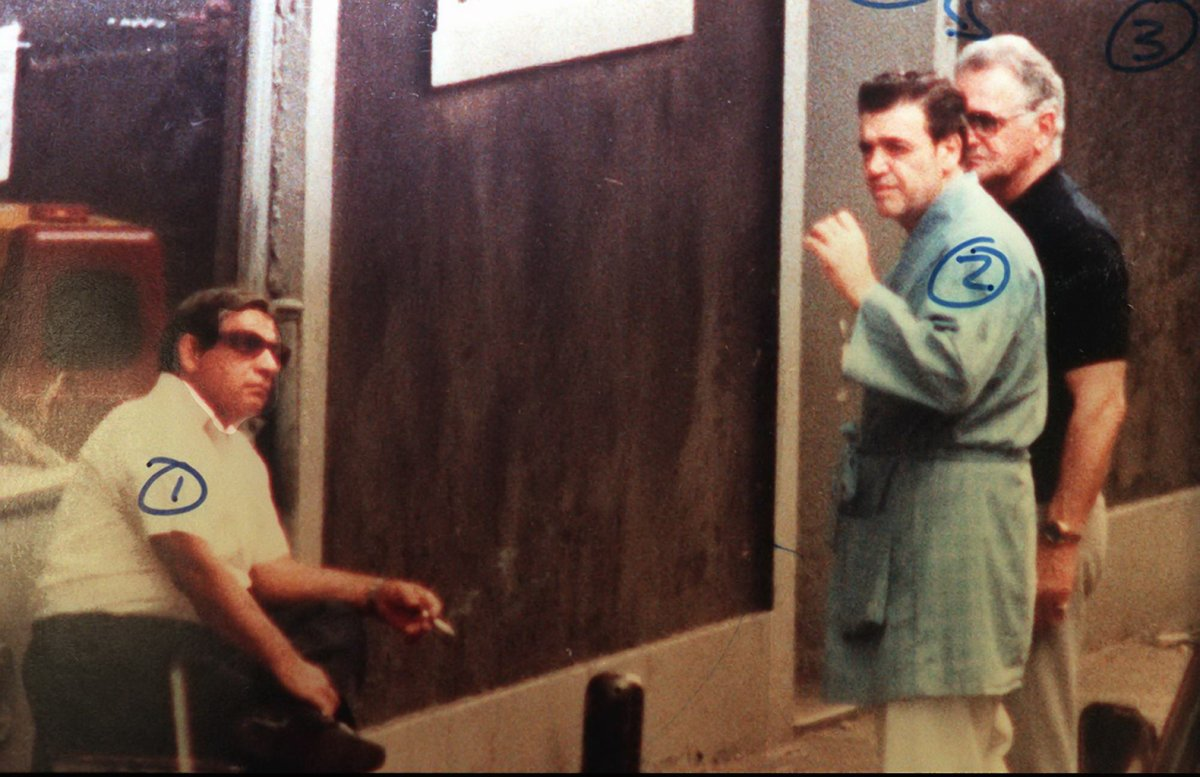
An FBI surveillance photo of Frank Condo (right) and Vincent Gigante (center)

The crew controlled many of the organized crime activities throughout downtown Manhattan, and some of the rackets included labor racketeering, gambling, loan sharking, hijackings, and extortion of businesses. The main hangout for Gigante and his crew was the Triangle Social Club, located at 208 Sullivan Street.

== Leaders ==
=== Caporegimes ===
- 1920s–1931 — Vito Genovese – promoted to underboss in 1931; promoted to boss of the Genovese crime family in 1957
- 1931–1959 — Anthony "Tony Bender" Strollo – promoted to acting boss in 1959; killed in 1962
- 1959–1965 — Thomas "Tommy Ryan" Eboli – front boss 1965–1972; killed in 1972
- 1965–1972 — Pasquale "Patsy Ryan" Eboli – younger brother of Thomas Eboli
  - Acting 1965–1972 — Dominick "Dom The Sailor" DiQuarto
- 1972–1981 — Vincent "The Chin" Gigante – promoted to boss in 1981
  - Acting 1978–1981 — Dominick "Fat Dom" Alongi – retired to Florida
- 1981–1993 — Dominick "Baldy Dom" Canterino – retired, died in 2008
- 1993–present – Unknown – it is not known who took over this crew after the retirement of Dominick Canterino.

== Former and current members ==
- Mario Gigante
- Dominick Cirillo
- Frank Condo
- Venero Mangano
- Louis Manna
- Andrew Gigante
- Vincent Esposito
- Ronald Belliveau
- Frank Caggiano
- Giuseppe Dellacroe
- Joseph Denti
- Ciro Perrotta
