= St. Athanasius Church (Bronx) =

Roman Catholic church in New York City, New York

Coordinates: 40°49′8.19″N 73°53′40.25″W

The Church of St. Athanasius
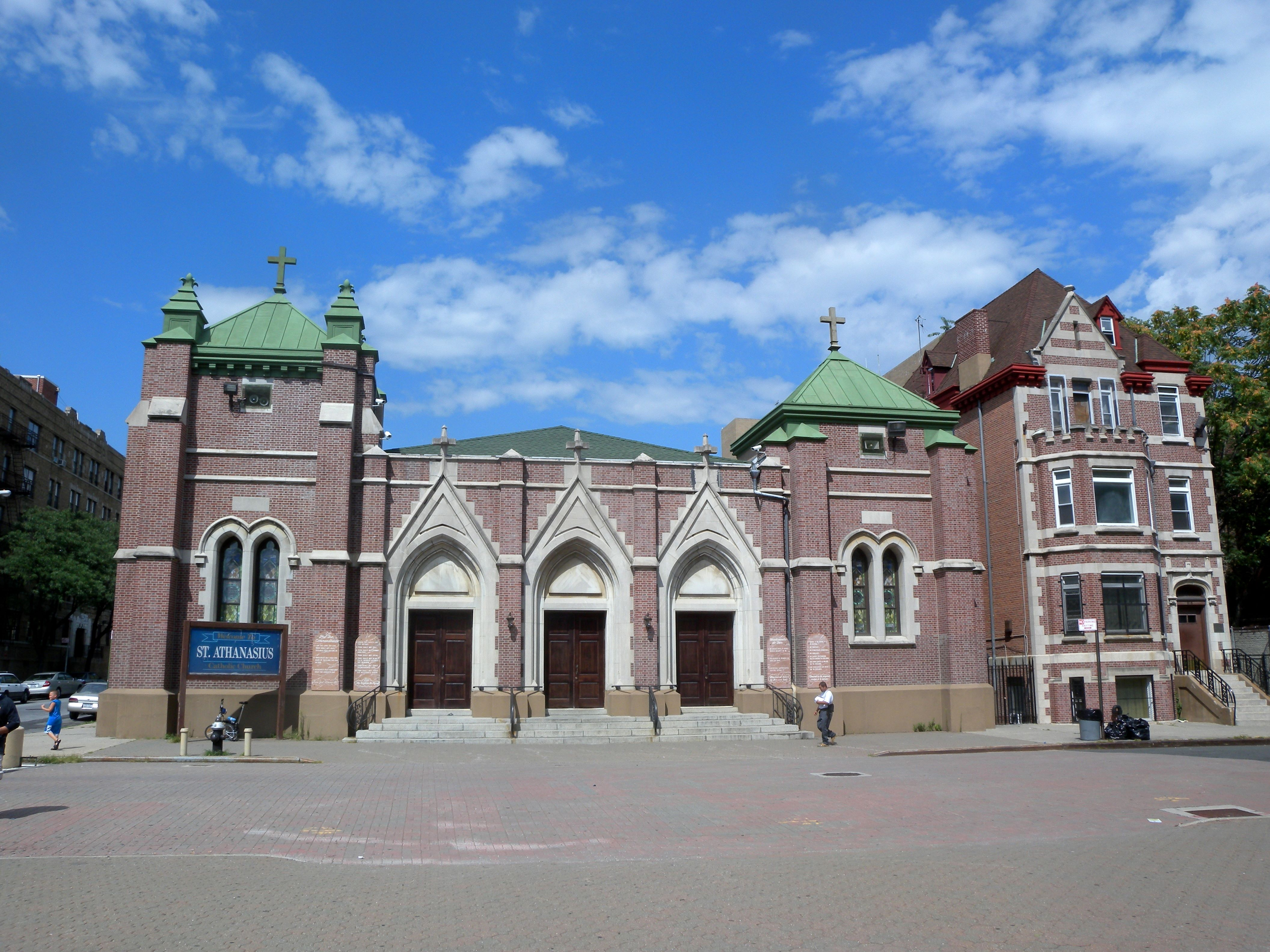
- Photographed in 2010
- Interactive map of the The Church of St. Athanasius area

General information
- Location: Bronx, New York City, United States
- Completed: 1908
- Client: Roman Catholic Archdiocese of New York

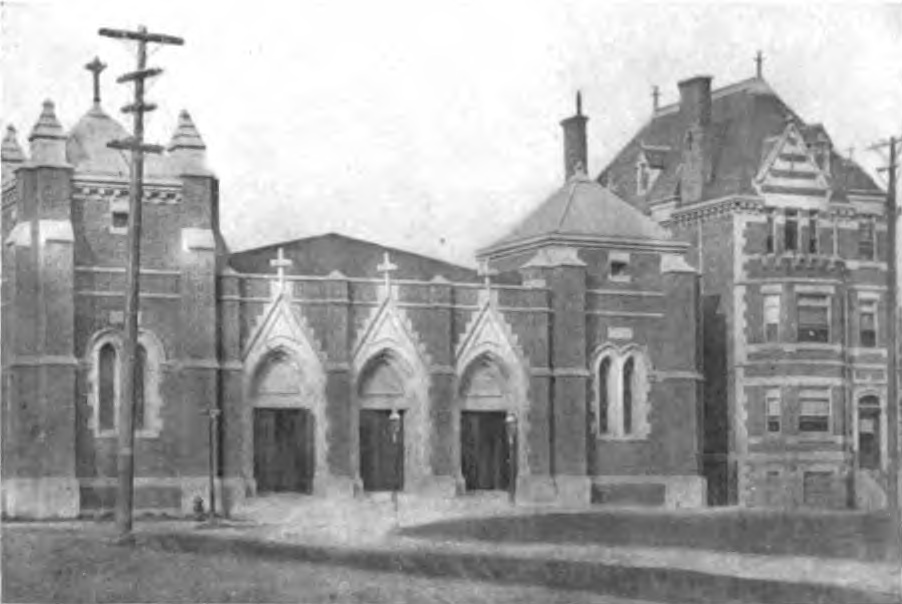
The church in 1914

The Church of St. Athanasius is a Roman Catholic parish church under the authority of the Roman Catholic Archdiocese of New York, located at Tiffany Street between Fox Street and Southern Boulevard, Longwood, Bronx, New York City. It is dedicated to Saint Athanasius of Alexandria, a Doctor of the Church.

== History ==
The Archbishop of New York, John Farley, commissioned the parish in 1907, purchasing the entire city block for $58,000. The cornerstone was laid on May 31, 1908, by Cardinal Michael Logue, Archbishop of Armagh, who was visiting the United States on the occasion of the centenary of the Archdiocese of New York. The building was solemnly dedicated on February 21, 1909. Terence James Cooke (later Archbishop of New York) served there as a curate in the 1950s.

The parish has long been prominent in serving its low-income neighborhood, in partnership with St. Anthony of Padua. Of note are longtime pastor Louis R. Gigante— brother of notorious gangster Vincent "the Chin" Gigante— who was assigned to the parish as a curate in 1958 and went on to found the Simpson Street Development Association in 1967, and Sister Miriam Thomas Collins, S.C.. Collins, a Sister of Charity (commonly known as Sister Thomas) who came to the parish in 1962 as a teacher, joined with Gigante to found the South East Bronx Community Organization (SEBCO) in 1968. SEBCO collects federal Section 8 funds to convert abandoned buildings into affordable housing. Another neighborhood activist group, the Mid-Bronx Desperadoes, was co-founded with St. Athanasius pastor William Smith in 1974. In 1985 Collins organized the first South Bronx Halloween parade.

A 105-unit affordable housing development which SEBCO built on the last parcel of city-owned land in the South Bronx was the Sister Thomas Apartments in 2008. At the dedication, the New York State Housing Finance Agency stated that "In the '60s and '70s the Hunts Point section of the South Bronx was a desolate place lined with the carcasses of buildings still smoldering from the latest fire…. The only refuge was St. Athanasius and its priests and nuns, who became beacons of hope and leaders in the tenants' rights movement…."

Nevertheless, Sister Thomas and the flea market she long organized were expelled from the parish unceremoniously in 2010, dividing the community, shortly after the arrival of a new pastor. Many parishioners participated in protests against the move, while others defended the new pastor.

== School ==
The Sisters of Charity of New York opened St. Athanasius School on September 8, 1913. The original school was situated adjacent to the church on Fox Street, but was outgrown. The parish constructed the current school building at 830 Southern Boulevard, which opened in September 1965.
