= Louis Gigante =

American priest (1932–2022)

- Church: Catholic Church

Orders
- Ordination: 1959

Personal details
- Born: Louis Robert Gigante; March 19, 1932 Manhattan, New York City, U.S.
- Died: October 19, 2022 (aged 90)
- Denomination: Roman Catholic
- Parents: Salvatore Gigante; Yolanda Gigante
- Children: 1
- Education: Georgetown University; St. Joseph's Seminary and College

Louis Robert Gigante (March 19, 1932 – October 19, 2022) was an American priest of the Catholic Church and a Bronx community activist, serving as one of the borough's New York City Council members. He founded the South East Bronx Community Organization (SEBCO). He also served as chaplain of the Italian-American Civil Rights League.

== Early life ==
Gigante was born in Manhattan on March 19, 1932. His father, Salvatore, was a watchmaker. His mother, Yolanda (Santasilia), worked as a seamstress. Both immigrated to the United States from Naples and did not speak English. He was the brother of two Genovese crime family members, family boss Vincent "The Chin" Gigante and top capo/acting boss Mario Gigante.

Gigante was raised in Greenwich Village and attended Cardinal Hayes High School in the Bronx. He played for its basketball team that won the Catholic schools city championship in 1949, before graduating in 1950. He was awarded an athletic scholarship by Georgetown University, where he was a guard and co-captain of the Georgetown Hoyas. After graduating in 1954, he attended St. Joseph's Seminary and College and was ordained to the Catholic priesthood in 1959.

== Presbyteral ministry ==
As a Catholic priest at St. Athanasius Church in the South Bronx neighborhood of Longwood, Gigante was one of the leading proponents of tenant rights reform in the late 1960s. As the parish priest, members of his congregation included future Supreme Court Associate Justice Sonia Sotomayor when she was a teenager.

In the fall of 1968, he founded the South East Bronx Community Organization (SEBCO), with funds from the federal Section 8 housing program, through which tenants pay 30 percent of their income in rent and the federal government pays the difference. SEBCO was generally considered to be one of the organizations most responsible for the economic and civic rehabilitation of the depressed South Bronx area. Gigante ran unsuccessfully for Congress in 1970.

By 1981, he had orchestrated the construction and rehabilitation of 1,100 federally subsidized apartments in the Hunts Point section of the South Bronx. He claimed credit for the rejuvenation of the Bronx, saying "I brought the neighborhood up from ashes to help the people in the South Bronx. There isn't one other organization that can take credit."

Later investigation revealed that SEBCO and other construction projects in the Bronx enriched both Gigante – who died with at least three homes and a $7 million fortune – and members of the Genovese crime syndicate, including Gigante's brothers. Other accusations range from Gigante being a slumlord to him being too old to manage such a large project.

== Political career ==
In November 1973, Gigante was elected to the New York City Council and represented the 8th City Council district until 1977, when he opted not to run for re-election.

== Later life ==
On July 30, 2021, it was reported that Gigante sexually abused a nine-year-old boy on multiple occasions during the mid-1970s while working at St. Athanasius Church. Another lawsuit filed the same year alleged that he sexually assaulted a girl in the early 1960s. Both cases were at the New York Supreme Court (the state's trial court) and not yet decided at the time of his death.

Gigante died on October 19, 2022, at age 90.

== Personal life ==
After he died, his will revealed he was a multimillionaire with a fortune of $7 million and he left nearly all his fortune to a single beneficiary, to the son he had while he was a priest, Gino Gigante.
