= Gambugliano =

- Comune
- Comune di Gambugliano
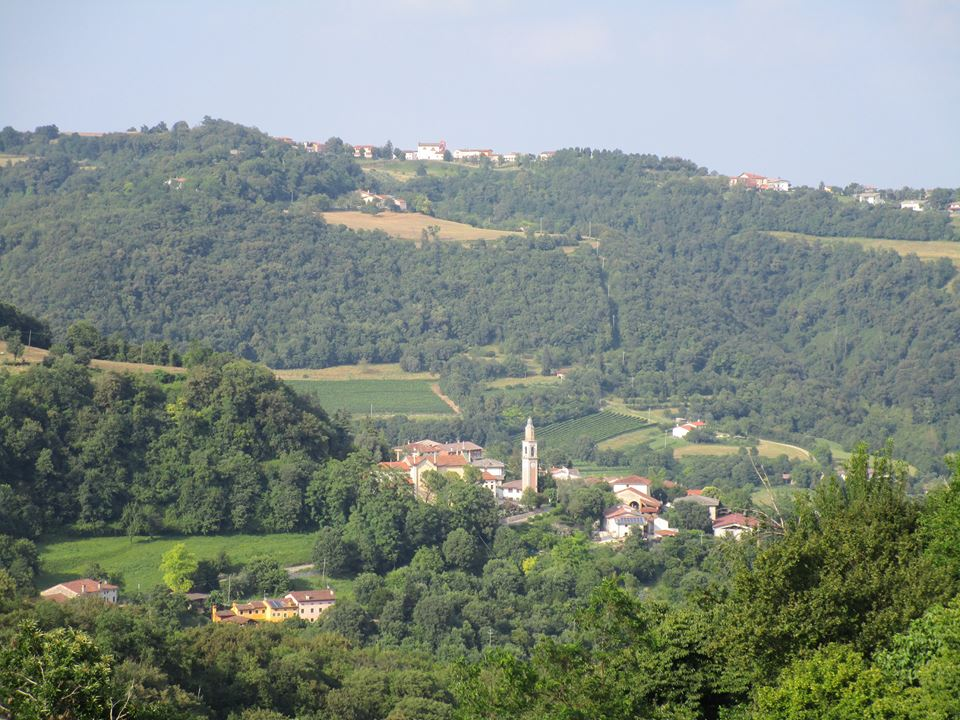
- View of Gambugliano

- Coat of arms

- Location within Italy Location within Veneto
- Coordinates: 45°35′N 11°26′E
- Country: Italy
- Region: Veneto
- Province: Vicenza (VI)
- Frazioni: Monte San Lorenzo

Government
  - Mayor: Lino Zenere

Area
  - Total: 7.95 km^{2} (3.07 sq mi)
- Elevation: 133 m (436 ft)

Population (31 August 2017)
  - Total: 834
  - Density: 105/km^{2} (272/sq mi)
- Time zone: UTC+1 (CET)
  - Summer (DST): UTC+2 (CEST)
- Postal code: 36050
- Dialing code: 0444
- Website: Official website

Gambugliano is a town and from 22 January 2024 part of (Italian, frazione) in the comune Sovizzo in the province of Vicenza, Veneto, Italy. It is southwest of SP46.

== See also ==
it:Fusione di comuni italiani Merger of Italian municipalities. Italian language Wikipedia.

== Sources ==
- (Google Maps)
