= Anthony Salerno =

American mobster (1911–1992)

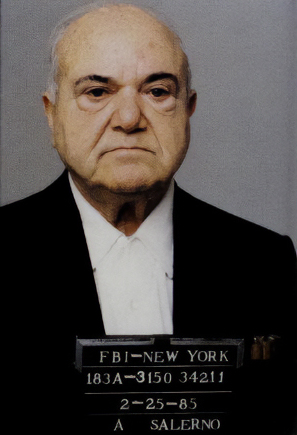
- Salerno's 1985 FBI mugshot
- Born: August 15, 1911; New York City, U.S.
- Died: July 27, 1992 (aged 80); Springfield, Missouri, U.S.
- Resting place: Saint Raymond's Cemetery, The Bronx
- Other name: Fat Tony
- Allegiance: Genovese crime family
- Convictions: Racketeering (1986); Racketeering (1988)
- Penalty: 100 years' imprisonment and fined $240,000 (1987); 70 years' imprisonment, fined $376,000 and ordered to forfeit half of the racketeering proceeds (1988)

Anthony "Fat Tony" Salerno (August 15, 1911 – July 27, 1992) was an American mobster who served as underboss and front boss of the Genovese crime family in New York City from 1981 until his conviction in 1986.

== Early life ==
Salerno was born at 115 East 116th Street and raised in East Harlem, Manhattan, New York to Alfio Salerno and Maria Carroccio, immigrants from San Fratello, Messina, Sicilia. In his youth, he became involved in gambling, numbers, loansharking, and protection rackets for the Luciano family, which later came to be known as the Genovese family. Salerno was a member of the 116th Street Crew, headed by Michael "Trigger Mike" Coppola.

== Criminal career ==
Salerno climbed the Genovese family ranks by controlling a numbers racket operation of possibly one-million-dollar-a-year revenue in Harlem as well as a major loansharking operation. In 1948, Coppola fled to Florida to escape murder charges, and Salerno took over the 116th Street crew.

In 1959, Salerno was a secret financial backer of a heavyweight professional boxing title fight at New York's Yankee Stadium between American boxer Floyd Patterson and Swedish boxer Ingemar Johansson. No charges were filed against Salerno. Salerno divided his time between a home in Miami Beach, Florida, a 100-acre (0.40 km^{2}) estate and horse farm in upstate Rhinebeck, New York, the Palma Boys Club in East Harlem, and his apartment in the upscale Gramercy Park section of Manhattan. Salerno served as consigliere, underboss, and acting boss of the Genovese family.

By the 1960s, Salerno controlled the largest numbers-racket operation in New York, which was grossing up to $50 million per year. He kept his headquarters at the Palma Boys Social Club in East Harlem and continued to work in these areas. The FBI filed an indictment against Salerno for heading a bookie and loan shark network that grossed $1 million annually. He hired Roy Cohn as his attorney. On April 20, 1978, Salerno was sentenced to six months in federal prison on illegal gambling and tax evasion charges. In early 1981, after his release from prison, Salerno suffered a mild stroke and retreated to his Rhinebeck estate to recuperate. At the time of his stroke, Salerno was Genovese underboss.

With Salerno's approval the Cuban-American mafia organization known as The Corporation headed by Jose Miguel Battle Sr. ran bolita in the New York City area, in exchange Salerno received a cut of the profits. He was introduced to Battle via Florida boss Santo Trafficante Jr.

== Genovese front boss and prison ==
After Salerno's recovery from the stroke and the March 31, 1981, death of Genovese front-boss Frank Tieri, Salerno succeeded Tieri. He would go on to suffer numerous more strokes, small or more severe, over the years.

Although law enforcement at the time believed that Salerno was the actual boss of the Genovese family, it was an open secret in New York Mafia circles that Salerno was merely a front man for the real boss, Vincent "Chin" Gigante. For instance, Alphonse "Little Al" D'Arco, who later became acting boss of the Lucchese crime family before turning informer, told investigators that when he became a Lucchese made man in 1982, he was told that Gigante was the boss of the Genovese family. Ever since the death of boss Vito Genovese in 1969, the real family leader had been Philip "Benny Squint" Lombardo. Over the years, Lombardo had used several front bosses to hide his real status from law enforcement, a practice continued when Gigante took over the family reins after Lombardo's 1981 retirement.

On February 25, 1985, Salerno and eight other New York bosses on the "Mafia Commission" were indicted in the Mafia Commission Trial. In October 1986, Fortune magazine named the 75-year-old Salerno as America's top gangster in power, wealth, and influence. For that reason, he was nominally the lead defendant in the trial. Many observers disputed Salerno's top ranking, claiming that law enforcement greatly exaggerated Salerno's importance to bring attention to their legal case against him. After Salerno's bail request was denied, his attorneys appealed the decision all the way to the United States Supreme Court, which, in United States v. Salerno, ruled that he could be held without bail because of his potential danger to the community. Along with the other defendants in the trial, whose prosecution was led by U.S. Attorney for the Southern District of New York Rudy Giuliani, Salerno pleaded not guilty on July 1, 1985.

On November 19, 1986, Salerno was convicted on RICO charges, and, on January 13, 1987, he was sentenced, along with six other defendants, to 100 years in prison without parole and fined $240,000.

While awaiting the Mafia Commission trial, Salerno was indicted in a separate trial on March 21, 1986, in a second federal racketeering indictment, which accused Salerno of having hidden controlling interests in the S & A Concrete Company and the Transit-Mix Concrete Corporation involved in the construction of Mount Sinai School of Medicine, Memorial Sloan-Kettering Cancer Center, and the Trump Tower. Salerno was also accused of illegally aiding the election of Roy Lee Williams to the national presidency of the Teamsters Union. Salerno pleaded not guilty on all charges. In October 1988, he was convicted on all charges and sentenced to 70 years in prison, penalized with a $376,000 fine, and ordered to forfeit half of the racketeering proceeds (estimated to be $30 million).

In 1986, shortly after Salerno's conviction in the Commission Trial, Salerno's longtime right-hand man, Vincent "The Fish" Cafaro, turned informant, and told the FBI that Salerno had never been the real boss of the Genoveses, but merely a front for Gigante. Cafaro also revealed that the Genovese family had been keeping up this ruse since 1969. An FBI bug had captured a conversation in which Salerno and capo Matthew "Matty the Horse" Ianniello were reviewing a list of prospective candidates to be made in another family. Frustrated that the nicknames of the wannabes hadn't been included, Salerno said, "I'll leave this up to the boss", a clear sign that he was not the real leader of the family. In any case, according to Selwyn Raab, organized-crime reporter for The New York Times, even though prosecutors erred in billing Salerno as the Genovese family's real boss, this mistaken assumption would not have affected Salerno's conviction at the Commission trial nor his 100-year sentence. In his book Five Families, Raab pointed out that Salerno was tried and convicted for specific criminal acts; not for being a boss.

== Death ==
After his imprisonment, Salerno's health deteriorated due to his diabetes and suspected prostate cancer. On July 27, 1992, Anthony Salerno died at the US Medical Center for Federal Prisoners in Springfield, Missouri from complications arising from a stroke.

Salerno was buried at Saint Raymond's Cemetery in the Throggs Neck section of the Bronx in New York City.

== In popular culture ==
Salerno is portrayed by Paul Sorvino in the film Kill the Irishman (2011), Domenick Lombardozzi in Martin Scorsese's The Irishman (2019), and by Joe Pingue in the film The Apprentice (2024).

American Mafia
Preceded by Michael "Trigger Mike" Coppola	Policy racket in New York City; 1948–1986	Succeeded by ?
Preceded by Michael "Mike" Miranda	Genovese crime family Consigliere; 1972–1975	Succeeded by Antonio "Buckaloo" Ferro
Preceded by Carmine "Little Eli" Zeccardi	Genovese crime family Underboss; 1975–1980	Succeeded by Vincent "The Chin" Gigante
