= Mike Coppola (mobster) =

American mobster (1900–1966)

Michael Coppola
- Born: July 2, 1900; New York, New York, U.S. (Note: Some sources state that Coppola was born in Italy.)
- Died: October 1, 1966 (aged 66); Boston, Massachusetts, U.S.
- Resting place: Ferncliff Cemetery, Westchester County, New York
- Other name: Trigger Mike
- Known for: Mob activity
- Spouse(s): Doris Lehman (died 1948); Ann Drahmann (died 1962)

Michael "Trigger Mike" Coppola (July 2, 1900 – October 1, 1966) was a New York City mobster who became a caporegime of the 116th Street Crew of the Luciano family, which later came to be known as the Genovese family. Coppola headed many Genovese family criminal operations from the late 1930s until the early 1960s. He should not be confused with Michael "Mikey Cigars" Coppola (born 1946), a later member of the Genovese crime family.

== Biography ==
Coppola's parents were Giuseppe and Angelina.

In 1927, Coppola and Joseph Rao were arrested on suspicion of murdering a bootlegging rival named Salvatore Barbera. Coppola was arrested in 1941 for burglary, then later assault, murder and drug dealing. Coppola entered the ranks of the New York mafiosi with a reputation as a sadistic and violent gunman during Prohibition. Following the end of the Castellammarese War gang war in New York, Coppola became a high-ranking member of Charles "Lucky" Luciano's family. In 1936, following the conviction of Luciano on prostitution charges and later underboss Vito Genovese's fleeing the country on a murder charge, Coppola was left in charge of the Luciano crime family criminal operations including a monopoly on New York's artichoke supply and Harlem's numbers racket, worth over $1,000,000 a year. He controlled Mason Tenders Locals 47 and 13 of the Laborers Union. Local 13 secretary-treasurer George Cervone was murdered in 1961 during a bitter struggle for control of the local. Shortly thereafter, his brother, Basil Cervone, assumed control, and eventually Basil's sons, Joseph and Basil Jr.

Despite the former Luciano gunman's rise to power, Coppola's trouble in his personal life became a source of ongoing problems throughout his life. Coppola was first married in 1943, to Doris Lehman, (Note: Some sources spell her maiden name as Lehmann.) a former showgirl. Her death was claimed to have been the result of overhearing Coppola's plans to assassinate New York Republican Party political activist Joseph Scottoriggio, who was murdered in 1946, in response to his opposition to Vito Marcantonio. Doris Coppola died in March 1948, a day after giving birth, reportedly murdered by her husband to prevent her from testifying against him after she had been charged with perjury (her scheduled testimony had been postponed due to her pregnancy). Coppola later remarried, to Ann Drahmann in December 1955. (Note: Drahmann's first name appears as Anne or Anna in some sources. Her maiden name was Augustine; Drahmann was the surname of her prior husband who died in a plane crash in 1952.)

In the 1940s he ran the Multiple Sports News Service with David Yaras of Chicago. In 1960, Coppola was one of 11 men officially listed in the Black Book by Nevada state officials, barring his entry into Nevada casinos. In February of that year, he sued his wife for divorce, claiming she threatened to kill him. A divorce was granted the following month to his wife, who apparently counter-sued. She later agreed to testify against Coppola in an income tax investigation, causing Coppola to order several gunmen to kidnap and assault her. Found severely beaten on an isolated beach in October 1960, Ann Drahmann (she reverted to her former name after divorcing) continued to aid the investigation. In April 1961, Coppola was indicted on four counts of income tax evasion. Following a mistrial, Coppola pleaded guilty in February 1962 and was fined $40,000 and sentenced to a year-and-a-day in federal prison.

Drahmann, who claimed she also suffered mental and physical abuse from Coppola, fled to Europe with $250,000 of the crime families’ money following Coppola's imprisonment for tax evasion in 1962. While staying in Rome, she sent a letter to the Internal Revenue Service (with certain portions addressed to then-U.S. Attorney General Robert F. Kennedy) detailing the criminal activities of the Luciano crime family as well as a letter to the incarcerated Coppola. She died by suicide from an overdose of sleeping pills while in Rome.

Following his release from prison, Coppola was unable to regain his previous power and lived in obscurity until his death in 1966 from nephritis at New England Baptist Hospital in Boston.

== Notes ==
Preceded by Dutch Schultz	Policy racket in New York City circa 1935–1948	Succeeded by Anthony "Fat Tony" Salerno
