= Vincent Gigante =

American boxer and mobster (1928–2005)

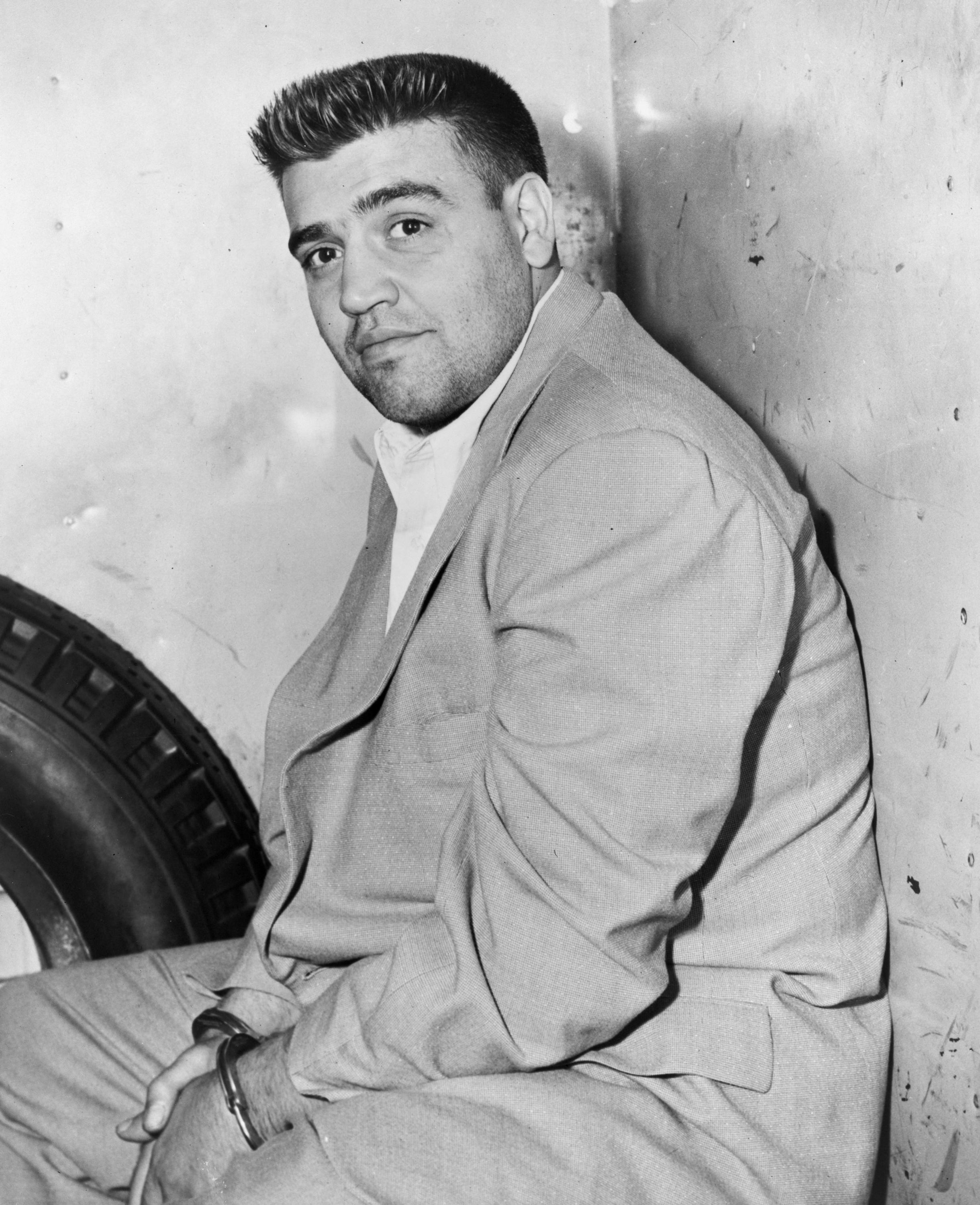
- Gigante in 1957
- Born: Vincent Louis Gigante; March 29, 1928; New York City, New York, U.S.
- Died: December 19, 2005 (aged 77); Springfield, Missouri, U.S.
- Other names: "Chin", "The Oddfather", "The Enigma in the Bathrobe", "The Robe", "The Real Boss of New York" and Vinny Gigante
- Occupation: Crime boss
- Predecessor: Philip Lombardo
- Successor: Liborio Bellomo
- Spouse: Olympia Grippa (m. 1950)
- Children: 8
- Parent(s): Salvatore Gigante; Yolonda Gigante
- Relatives: Mario, Louis, Pasquale and Ralph Gigante (brothers)
- Allegiance: Genovese crime family
- Convictions: Drug trafficking (1959); Racketeering and conspiracy (1997); Obstruction of justice (2003)
- Penalty: Seven years' imprisonment; 12 years' imprisonment and fined $1.25 million; Three years' imprisonment
- Accomplice: Olympia Esposito
- Boxing career
- Nickname: "Chin" (not "The Chin") Gigante
- Weight: Light heavyweight

Boxing record
- Total fights: 25
- Wins: 21
- Win by KO: 1
- Losses: 4

Vincent Louis Gigante (/dʒɪˈɡænti/ jig-AN-tee, Italian: [dʒiˈɡante]; March 29, 1928 – December 19, 2005), also known as "Chin", was an American mobster who was boss of the Genovese crime family of New York City between 1981 and 2005.

Gigante started out as a professional boxer who fought in twenty-five matches between 1944 and 1947. He then started working as a Mafia enforcer for what was known at that time as the Luciano crime family, forerunner of the Genovese family. Three of Gigante's four brothers – Mario, Pasquale and Ralph – followed him into the Mafia. Only one brother, Louis, stayed out of organized crime, instead becoming a Catholic priest. In 1957, Gigante was the gunman in the failed assassination of longtime Luciano boss Frank Costello. Two years later he was sentenced to seven years in prison for drug trafficking, and after sharing a prison cell with Costello's rival, Vito Genovese, Gigante became a caporegime (captain) overseeing his own crew of Genovese soldiers and associates based in Greenwich Village.

Gigante quickly rose to power during the 1960s and 1970s, becoming the family's de facto boss while Anthony "Fat Tony" Salerno served as front boss during the first half of the 1980s. He also ordered the failed murder attempt of Gambino family boss John Gotti in 1986. With the arrest and conviction of Gotti and various Gambino family members in 1992, Gigante was recognized as the most powerful crime boss in the United States.

For almost thirty years, Gigante feigned insanity in an effort to thwart law enforcement. Dubbed "the Oddfather" and "the Enigma in the Bathrobe" by the media, he often wandered the streets of Greenwich Village in his bathrobe and slippers, mumbling incoherently to himself. Gigante was indicted on federal racketeering charges in 1990 but was determined to be mentally unfit to stand trial. In 1997 he was tried and convicted of racketeering and conspiracy and was sentenced to twelve years in prison. Facing obstruction of justice charges in 2003, Gigante pleaded guilty and admitted that his supposed insanity was an elaborate effort to avoid prosecution, as he was sentenced to an additional three years in prison. Gigante died in the United States Medical Center for Federal Prisoners on December 19, 2005.

== Early life and boxing career ==
Vincent Gigante was born in New York City on March 29, 1928. His parents were Salvatore Gigante, a watchmaker, and Yolanda Gigante (née Scotto), a seamstress, both Italian immigrants from Naples. He had four brothers: Mario, Pasquale and Ralph, who followed him into organized crime; and Louis, who became a Catholic priest at St. Athanasius Church in the South Bronx and, later, a member of the New York City Council. According to Louis, Gigante's nickname, "Chin”, stemmed from their mother affectionately calling him Chinzeeno as a boy, derived from the name Vincenzo, the Italian form of Vincent. Gigante graduated from Public School 3 in Manhattan's West Village, and later attended Textile High School before dropping out.

Gigante was a professional light heavyweight boxer between 1944 and 1947, fighting under the moniker "Chin" Gigante. He fought twenty-five matches and lost four, boxing 117 rounds. His first professional boxing match was against Vic Chambers on July 18, 1944, in Union City, New Jersey, which he lost. Gigante fought Chambers a second time at the St. Nicholas Arena on October 6, 1944, and defeated him. He defeated Chambers again on June 29, 1945, at Madison Square Garden. His last match was against Jimmy Slade on May 17, 1947, at Ridgewood Grove Arena, Brooklyn, which he lost by technical knockout.

Gigante lived in Old Tappan, New Jersey, with his wife Olympia Grippa, whom he married in 1950, and their five children: Andrew, Salvatore, Yolanda, Roseanne and Rita. He had a second family at a townhouse on the Upper East Side of Manhattan with his longtime mistress and common-law wife, Olympia Esposito, and their three children: Vincent, Lucia and Carmella. Gigante often stayed at his mother's apartment in Greenwich Village.

== Criminal career ==
=== Costello murder attempt and caporegime ===
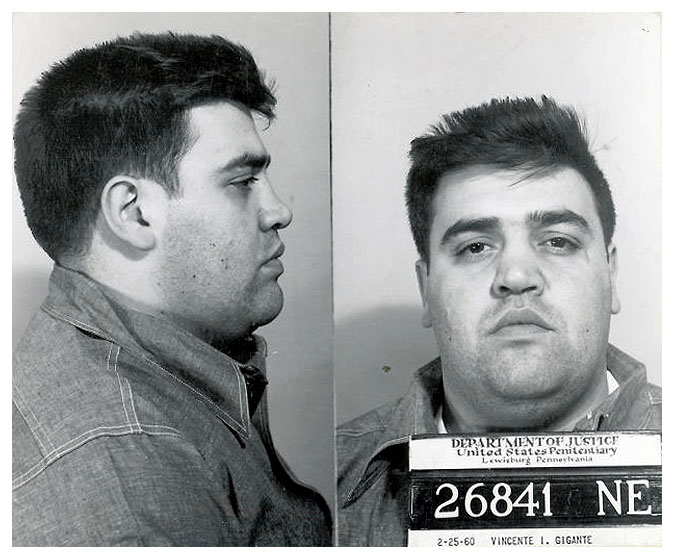
Mugshot of Gigante, 1960

As a teenager, Gigante became the protégé of Vito Genovese, then a caporegime (captain, or head of a "crew") in the Luciano crime family, who had helped pay for Gigante's mother's surgery. Between the ages of 17 and 25, he was arrested seven times on charges ranging from receiving stolen goods, possession of an unlicensed handgun and illegal gambling and bookmaking. Most of these charges were dismissed or resolved by fines, except for a sixty-day jail sentence for a gambling conviction. During this time, Gigante listed his occupation as a tailor.

In early 1957, Genovese decided to move against Luciano family boss Frank Costello, using Gigante as his assassin. On May 2, 1957, Gigante shot and wounded Costello outside his apartment building. Although the wound was superficial, it persuaded Costello to relinquish power to Genovese and retire. Genovese then controlled what is now called the Genovese crime family. A doorman identified Gigante as the gunman. In 1958, Costello testified that he was unable to recognize his assailant. Gigante was acquitted on charges of attempted murder.

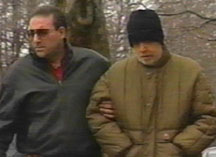
An FBI surveillance photo of Gigante (right) strolling through Greenwich Village, being led by his son Andrew

In 1959, Gigante was convicted, with Genovese, of heroin trafficking and sentenced to seven years in prison. Gigante was paroled after five years. Not long afterward, he was promoted from soldier to captain, running the Greenwich Village Crew, and headquartered at the Triangle Civic Improvement Association. Gigante developed a reputation as a formidable, intelligent and powerful captain.

Beginning in the 1960s, Gigante took to walking around his neighborhood in a bathrobe, pajamas and slippers while mumbling to himself, which law enforcement agents, prosecutors and Mafia defectors later said was a performance intended to allow Gigante to avoid prosecution for his criminal activities. This came to be known as the "Bathrobe Defense," in which those accused of criminal wrongdoing feign mental incompetence to avoid the legal consequence of such behavior.

In 1969, Gigante was indicted in New Jersey for conspiracy to bribe the five-member Old Tappan police force. The charge was dropped after Gigante's lawyers presented reports from psychiatrists that he was mentally unfit to stand trial. From that point forward, Gigante was treated twenty times for psychiatric disorders. Gigante's "primary treating psychiatrist", Eugene D'Adamo, noted:

Vincent Gigante has been diagnosed since 1969 as suffering from schizophrenia, paranoid type with [periodic] acute exacerbations which result in hospitalization.

Gigante's lawyers and relatives said that Gigante had been mentally disabled since the late 1960s, with a below-normal IQ of 69 to 72.

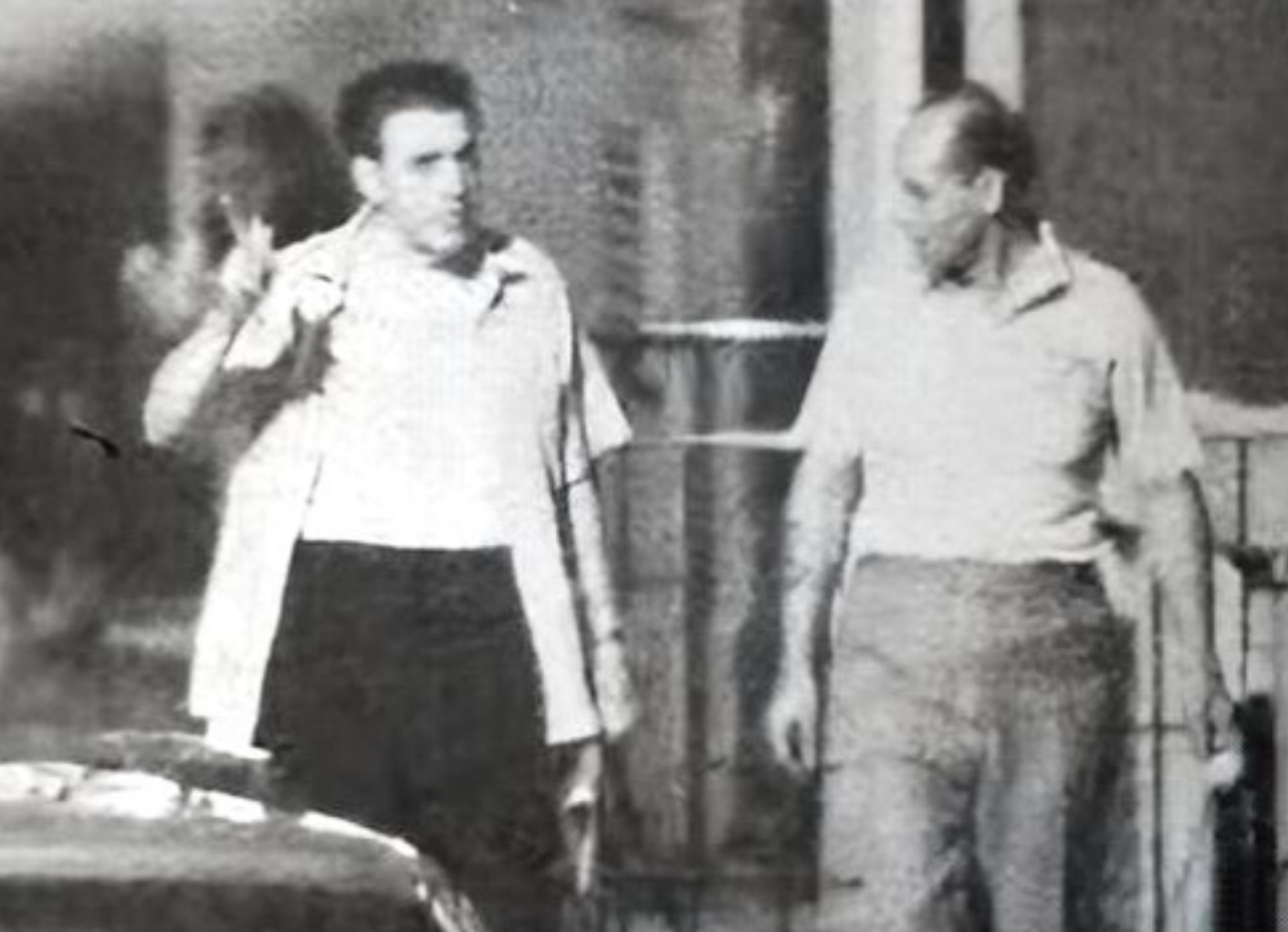
FBI surveillance photo of Vincent Gigante (left) and Dominick Canterino

=== Genovese crime boss ===
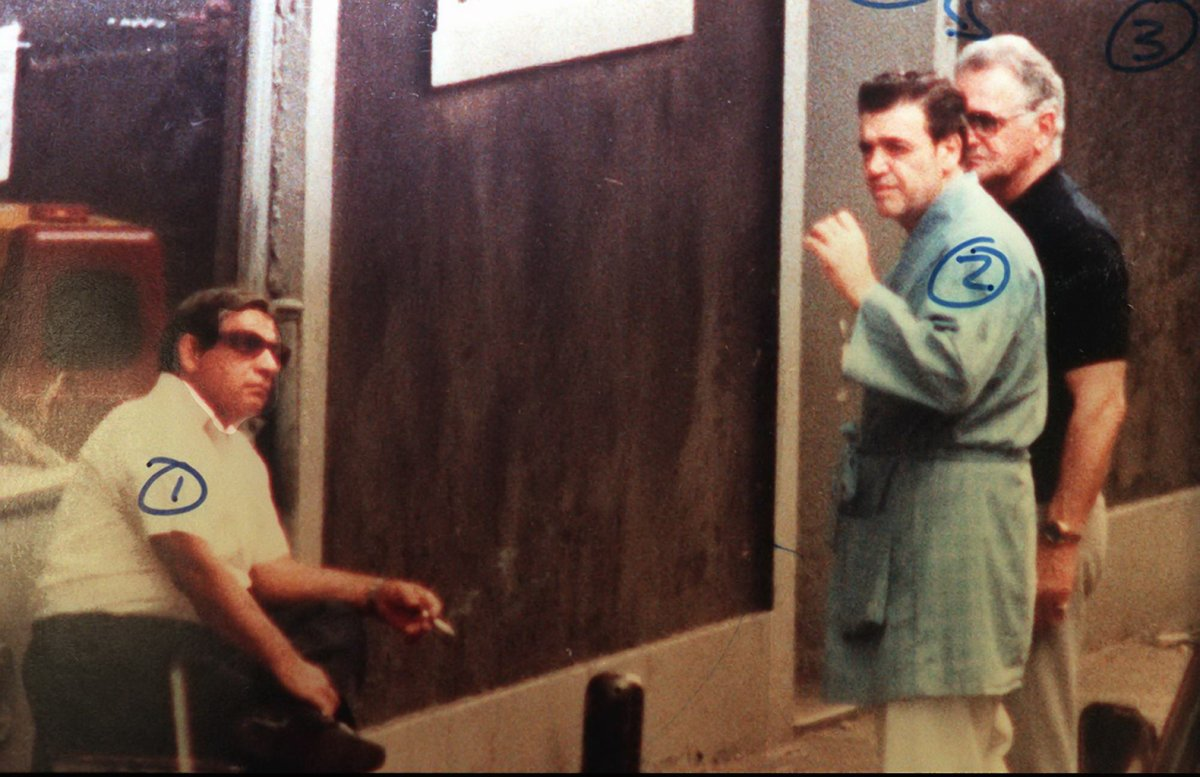
An FBI surveillance photo of Frank Condo (right) and Vincent Gigante (center)

By 1980, Gigante was promoted to consigliere of the Genovese family. In 1981, Genovese's successor, Philip "Benny Squint" Lombardo, stepped down as boss due to poor health. With Lombardo's support, Gigante became boss of the Genovese family. Anthony "Fat Tony" Salerno was made front boss of the family to fool law enforcement.

Gigante built a vast network of bookmaking and loansharking rings, profiting from the extortion of garbage, shipping, trucking and construction companies seeking labor peace or contracts from carpenters', Teamsters and laborers' unions, including those at the Javits Center, as well as protection payoffs from merchants at the Fulton Fish Market. Gigante also had influence in the Feast of San Gennaro in Little Italy, operating gambling games, extorting payoffs from vendors and pocketing thousands of dollars donated to a neighborhood church until a 1995 crackdown by New York City officials.

On April 13, 1986, Gambino crime family underboss Frank DeCicco was murdered when his car was bombed following a visit to James Failla, a loyalist to murdered Gambino boss Paul Castellano. The bombing was carried out by Victor Amuso and Anthony Casso of the Lucchese crime family, under orders of Gigante and Lucchese boss Anthony Corallo, to avenge Castellano and Thomas Bilotti by killing their successors. John Gotti planned to visit Failla that day but canceled, and the bomb was detonated after a Gambino soldier accompanying DeCicco was mistaken for Gotti.

In January 1987, Salerno was sentenced to 100 years in prison for racketeering, along with top members of the other Five Families of New York, as part of the Mafia Commission Trial. Salerno had initially been billed as the boss of the Genovese family, but shortly after the trial, his longtime right-hand man, Vincent "The Fish" Cafaro, turned informant and told the FBI that Salerno had been acting as a front for Lombardo and Gigante since 1969. FBI bugs captured a conversation in which Salerno and captain Matthew "Matty the Horse" Ianniello reviewed a list of prospective candidates to become made members in another family; frustrated that the nicknames of the potential inductees had not been included, Salerno shrugged and said, "I'll leave this up to the boss." It was well known in the New York Mafia long before then that Salerno was a front. For example, newly inducted soldiers were told that Gigante, not Salerno, headed the Genovese family.

Gigante was reclusive, and almost impossible to capture on wiretaps, speaking softly, avoiding telephones and even at times whistling into the receiver. He almost never left his home unoccupied because he knew federal agents would sneak in and plant a bug. Genovese members were not allowed to mention Gigante's name in conversations or during phone calls. When they had to mention him, members pointed to their chins or made the letter "C" with their fingers.

Following Gotti's imprisonment in 1992, Gigante came to be known as the figurehead capo di tutti capi, the "boss of all bosses", despite the position being abolished in 1931 with the murder of Salvatore Maranzano.

=== Trials and conviction ===
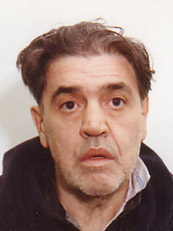
FBI mugshot of Gigante

From 1978 to 1990, four of the five crime families of New York, including the Genovese family, rigged bids for 75% of $191 million, or about $142 million, of the window contracts awarded by the New York City Housing Authority. Installation companies were required to make union payoffs between $1 and $2 for each window installed.

In 1988, Gigante had open-heart surgery. On May 30, 1990, Gigante was indicted along with other members of four of the Five Families in the window installation scheme. Gigante attended his arraignment in pajamas and bathrobe. Due to his defense that he was mentally and physically impaired, legal battles ensued for seven years over his competence to stand trial.

In June 1993, Gigante was under indictment again, charged with sanctioning the murders of six mobsters and conspiring to kill three others, including Gambino boss John Gotti. At sanity hearings in March 1996, Sammy "The Bull" Gravano, former underboss of the Gambino crime family, who became a cooperating witness in 1991, and Alphonse "Little Al" D'Arco, former acting boss of the Lucchese family, testified that Gigante was lucid at top-level Mafia meetings and that he had told other gangsters that his eccentric behavior was a pretense. Gigante's lawyers got testimony and reports from psychiatrists that from 1969 to 1995 Gigante had been confined 28 times in hospitals for treatment of hallucinations and that he suffered from "dementia rooted in organic brain damage".

In August 1996, senior judge of the United States District Court for the Eastern District of New York Eugene Nickerson ruled that Gigante was mentally competent to stand trial. He pleaded not guilty and had been free for years on $1 million bail. Gigante had another cardiac operation in December 1996. On June 25, 1997, Gigante's trial started. Gigante stood trial in a wheelchair. On July 25, 1997, after almost three days of deliberations, the jury convicted Gigante of conspiring in plots to kill other mobsters and of running rackets as head of the Genovese family. Prosecutors said the verdict finally established that Gigante was not mentally ill, as his lawyers and relatives had long maintained.

On December 18, 1997, Gigante was sentenced to 12 years in prison and fined $1.25 million by judge Jack B. Weinstein, a lenient sentence due to Gigante's "age and frailty". Weinstein declared that Gigante had been "finally brought to bay in his declining years after decades of vicious criminal tyranny". While in prison, he maintained his role as boss of the Genovese family, while other mobsters were entrusted to run the family's day-to-day activities. Gigante relayed orders to the crime family through his son, Andrew, who visited him in prison.

On January 23, 2002, Gigante was indicted with several other mobsters, including his son Andrew, on racketeering and obstruction of justice charges. Prosecutors accused him of continuing to rule his family from prison and using Andrew to funnel messages to the family. They also wanted him held responsible for causing a seven-year delay in his previous trial by feigning insanity. Several days later, Andrew was released on $2.5 million bail. Federal prosecutor Roslynn R. Mauskopf had planned to play tapes showing him "fully coherent, careful and intelligent," running crime operations from prison. Faced with this evidence, Gigante pleaded guilty to obstruction of justice on April 7, 2003, just hours before the trial was to start. Judge I. Leo Glasser sentenced him to an additional three years in prison. Mauskopf said, "The jig is up ... Vincent Gigante was a cunning faker, and those of us in law enforcement always knew that this was an act ... The act ran for decades, but today it's over."

On July 25, 2003, Andrew Gigante was sentenced to two years in prison and fined $2.5 million for racketeering and extortion. The New York Times organized-crime reporter and mob historian Selwyn Raab described Gigante's plea deal as an "unprecedented capitulation" for a Mafia boss. It was almost unheard of for a boss to even consider pleading guilty. Gigante agreed to the deal to ease the burden on his relatives. For instance, Andrew faced up to 20 years in prison had he gone to trial. Another provision of the plea agreement stipulated that any relatives who helped in his deception, including his wife, mistress, and Father Louis, would not be charged with obstruction of justice.

== Death ==
Gigante died on December 19, 2005, at the Medical Center for Federal Prisoners in Springfield, Missouri. His funeral and burial were held four days later, on December 23, at Saint Anthony of Padua Church in Greenwich Village, largely in anonymity.

Since Gigante's death, his family has continued to live well. According to a 2011 report by Jerry Capeci, Gigante's relatives earn nearly $2 million a year as employees of companies on the New Jersey waterfront.

== In popular culture ==
=== Films and television ===
- He is portrayed by Nicholas Kepros in the 1998 TV film Witness to the Mob
- The Law & Order episode "Faccia e Faccia", first aired February 28, 1998, featured an aging mafia don claiming mental impairment, inspired by Gigante
- He is portrayed by Garth Burton in the 2015 AMC series The Making of the Mob
- He is portrayed by John Dinello on the 2017 TV series The Deuce
- In the 2018 film Gotti, Gigante is portrayed by Sal Rendino
- Gigante is portrayed in the 2019 film Mob Town by Nick Cordero. This would be Nick Cordero's final movie role before his death on July 5, 2020
- He is portrayed by Vincent D'Onofrio in the 2019 TV series Godfather of Harlem
- Gigante is portrayed by Tony Amendola in the 2022 TV miniseries Black Bird
- Gigante is portrayed by Cosmo Jarvis in the 2025 film The Alto Knights

=== Documentaries ===
- The story of the FBI investigation into Gigante was depicted in season 1, episode 2 of The FBI Files documentary show, titled "The Crazy Don" (which first aired on December 8, 1998).
- National Geographic aired a six-part documentary series, Inside the American Mob, where Gigante features prominently in episode 5, "The Rise and Fall of Gotti", while actions attributed to him are discussed in episode 3, "New York–Philly War".

American Mafia
Preceded by Anthony "Fat Tony" Salerno	Genovese crime family Underboss; 1980–1981	Succeeded by Saverio "Sammy" Santora
Preceded by Philip "Benny Squint" Lombardo	Genovese crime family Boss; 1981–2005	Succeeded by Liborio "Barney" Bellomo
