= Liborio Bellomo =

American mobster

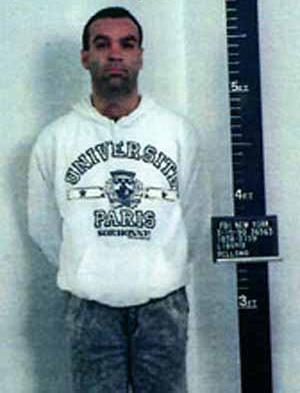
- A mugshot of Bellomo from 1996
- Born: Liborio Salvatore Bellomo; January 8, 1957 (age 69)
- Other name: Barney
- Occupation: Crime boss
- Predecessor: Vincent Gigante
- Children: 4
- Allegiance: Genovese crime family
- Convictions: Extortion (1997); Mail fraud (2007)
- Penalty: 10 years' imprisonment; One year imprisonment

Liborio Salvatore “Barney” Bellomo (born January 8, 1957) is an American mobster and boss of the Genovese crime family of New York City. Bellomo was a member of the 116th Street Crew of Saverio "Sammy Black" Santora.

== Early life ==
Bellomo is the son of Salvatore Bellomo, who was a Genovese soldier and close associate of Anthony "Fat Tony" Salerno. He is the double cousin of Genovese associate Liborio Thomas Bellomo; their fathers are brothers and their mothers are sisters. This has led law enforcement to confuse their identities on several occasions. In 1997, Liborio Thomas Bellomo swore in an affidavit that he was guilty of federal charges instead of Bellomo. Bellomo graduated from Monsignor Scanlan High School in the Bronx and spent a year at college majoring in mortuary science.

== Criminal career ==
Bellomo was inducted into the Genovese crime family in 1977, aged 20, in an induction ceremony held above a pizzeria in East Harlem.

=== Acting boss and indictment ===
In 1990, Kenneth McCabe, then-organized crime investigator for the United States attorney's office in Manhattan, identified Bellomo as "acting boss" of the crime family following the indictment of Vincent Gigante in the "Windows Case". On June 11, 1996, Bellomo was indicted on Racketeer Influenced and Corrupt Organizations Act (RICO) charges, including the murders of mobster Ralph DeSimone and Antonio DiLorenzo, extortion, and labor racketeering.

DiLorenzo was found shot to death in the backyard of his home in West New York, New Jersey. DeSimone was found in the trunk of his car at LaGuardia Airport in Queens, shot five times. Both DeSimone and DiLorenzo were allegedly murdered because the Genovese leadership thought they were government informants.

Bellomo's lawyers stated that their client passed two polygraph tests in which he denied killing anyone. FBI agents shaved Bellomo's head, looking for evidence that Bellomo had used lithium to beat the polygraph machines.

In February 1997, prosecutors dropped the DeSimone and DiLorenzo murder charges and offered Bellomo a chance to plead guilty to extorting payoffs from a construction union and a garbage hauling company. Bellomo accepted the deal and was sentenced to 10 years in prison.

=== Prison and release ===
On July 13, 2001, the imprisoned Bellomo was indicted on money laundering charges related to the Genovese family's involvement in the waterfront rackets and control of the ILA. Bellomo was accused of hiding money stolen from the ILA's members pension fund account between 1996 and 1997. Bellomo again pleaded guilty to lesser charges, pushing back his scheduled release date in 2004.

On February 23, 2006, Bellomo and over 30 Genovese family members were indicted on more racketeering charges. Bellomo was specifically charged with ordering the 1998 murder of Ralph Coppola, the acting captain of Bellomo's crew and Bellomo's good friend. On September 16, 1998, Coppola disappeared a few weeks before his sentencing on fraud charges and was never found. Government witness Peter Peluso, a former lawyer for the Genovese family, stated that he had transported a message from Bellomo in prison ordering Coppola's murder. Some accounts state that Coppola was disrespectful; others say that he was stealing family profits.

According to the Bellomo indictment:

LIBORIO S. BELLOMO, a/k/a "Barney Bellomo," the defendant, was, at various times relevant to this Indictment, a Soldier, Capo, and Acting Boss of the Genovese Organized Crime Family. Prior to becoming Acting Boss of the Genovese Organized Crime Family in or about 1992, BELLOMO was first a Soldier in the Genovese Family, and then a powerful Capo, who controlled a crew of Soldiers and associates based in the Bronx, New York. BELLOMO was responsible for, amongst other things, control over labor unions associated with the Jacob Javits Convention Center in Manhattan. BELLOMO became the Acting Boss of the Genovese Organized Crime Family in or about 1992, following the incarceration of Genovese Family Boss Vincent Gigante. In or about 1996, BELLOMO was himself incarcerated after being arrested on Federal criminal charges filed in the United States District Court for the Southern District of New York. Following his incarceration and even after being replaced as Acting Boss, BELLOMO retained significant power and authority within the Genovese Organized Crime Family, and he continued to be consulted on, and make decisions with respect to, the Genovese Family's criminal activities. In or about 1997, following his conviction on Federal extortion charges, BELLOMO was sentenced to a term of 10 years' imprisonment. BELLOMO's criminal activities included the 1998 murder of Ralph Coppola, a Genovese Family Soldier and Acting Capo, as well as his participation in two schemes to obstruct justice, one by conspiring to tamper with a potential witness, and the other by giving false and misleading testimony in a grand jury proceeding.

Peluso pleaded guilty to his role in the murder. However, the government had no proof that Peluso had met with Bellomo. With insufficient evidence to press the murder charge against Bellomo, the government offered him a plea bargain for mail fraud in 2007. Bellomo accepted and received one additional year in prison instead of four, as his daughter Sabrina gave a tearful plea to judge Lewis A. Kaplan alongside her three brothers.

On December 1, 2008, Bellomo was released from prison. Since his release, Bellomo has been the alleged boss of the Genovese family. He has maintained a low key presence, with some considering him the modern day 'Boss of Bosses'.

American Mafia
Preceded by Saverio "Sammy" Santora as Capo	Genovese crime family Capo of 116th Street Crew; 1982 - 1998	Succeeded by Ernest "Ernie" Muscarella
Preceded by Vincent "Chin" Gigante as boss	Genovese crime family Acting boss 1989 - 1996	Succeeded by Dominick Cirillo
Preceded by Anthony "Fat Tony" Salerno as front boss	Genovese crime family Street boss 1992 - 1996	Frank Serpico
Preceded by Vincent Gigante	Genovese crime family Boss; 2006−present	Incumbent
