= Little Italy, Manhattan =

Neighborhood in New York City

Little Italy La piccola Italia (Italian)
- Neighborhood in Manhattan
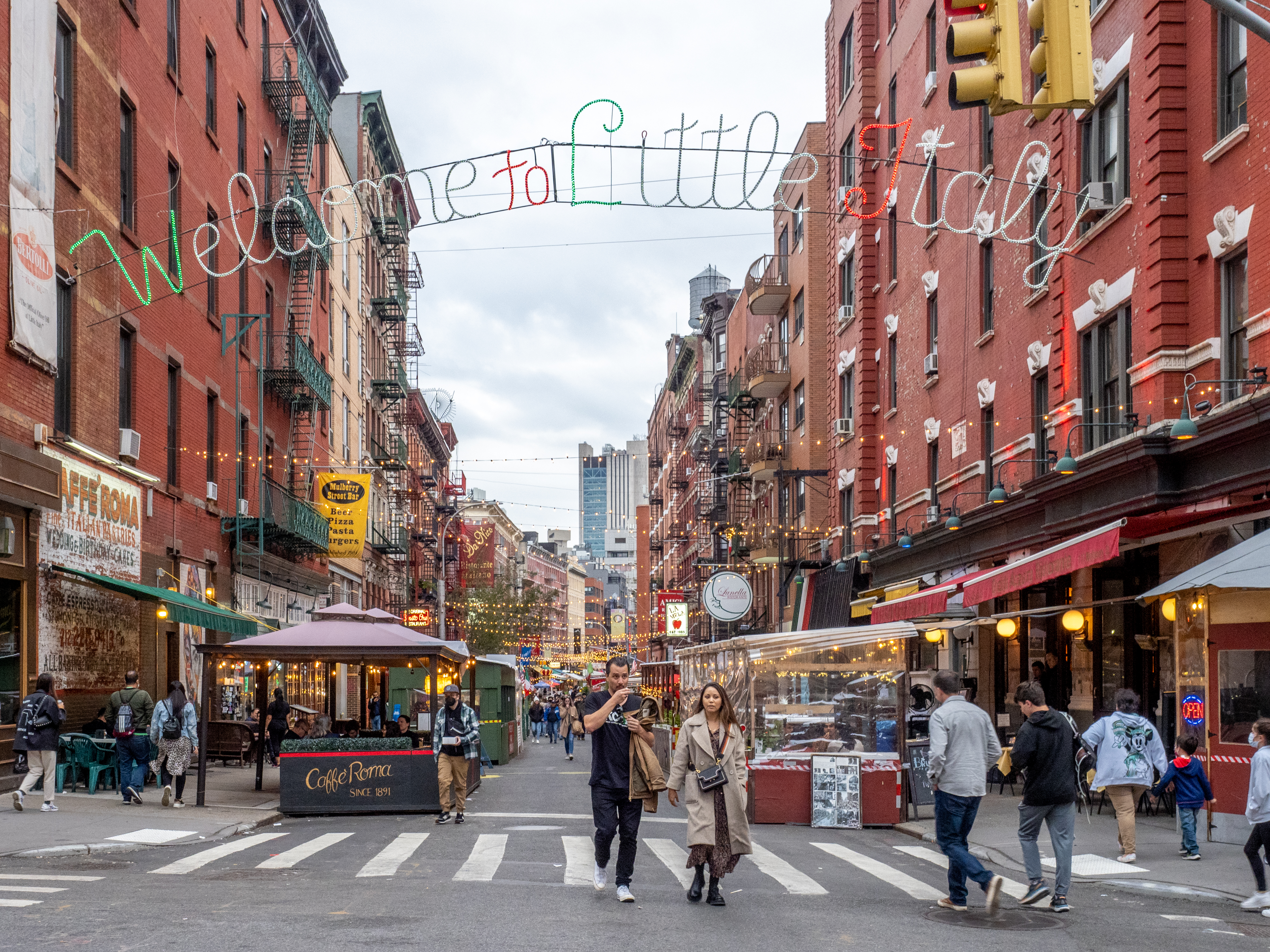
- Sign above Mulberry Street at Broome Street
- Interactive map of Little Italy
- Coordinates: 40.719°N 73.997°W
- Country: United States
- State: New York
- City: New York City
- Borough: Manhattan
- Community District: Manhattan 3
- ZIP Code: 10013
- Area codes: 212, 332, 646, and 917
- Chinatown and Little Italy Historic District
- U.S. National Register of Historic Places
- U.S. Historic district
- NRHP reference No.: 10000012
- Added to NRHP: February 12, 2010

Little Italy is a neighborhood in Lower Manhattan in New York City, known for its Italian American population. It is bounded on the west by Tribeca and Soho, on the south by Chinatown, on the east by the Bowery and Lower East Side, and on the north by Nolita.

== History ==
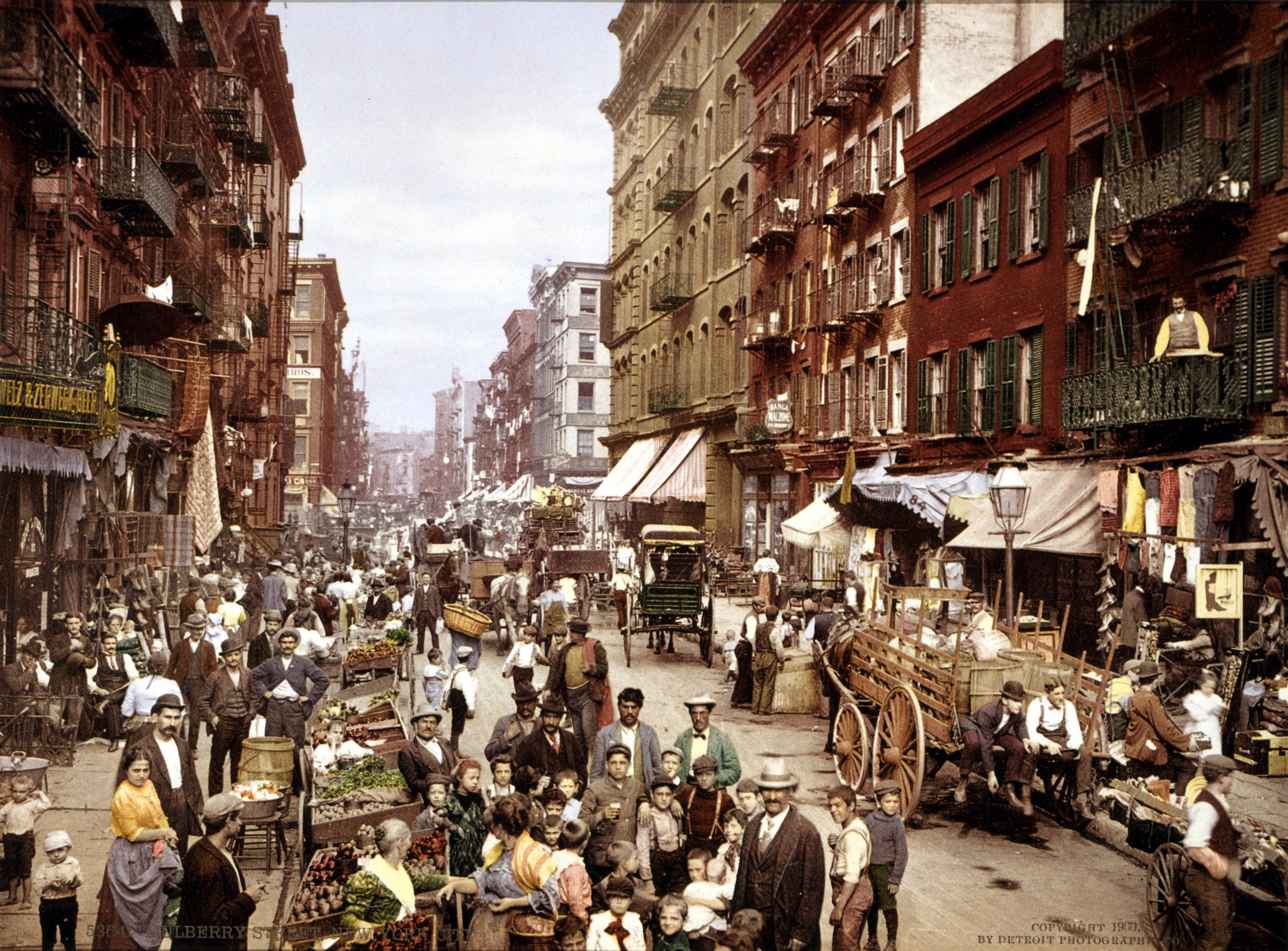
Little Italy, Lower East Side, c. 1900

At its largest, Little Italy used to occupy a space in lower Manhattan bound by Lafayette Street to the west and Bowery to the east, Kenmare Street to the north and Worth Street to the south. It is now only five blocks on Mulberry Street north of Canal St. Little Italy originated at Mulberry Bend south of Canal, in what had formerly been the Five Points area but is now the heart of Chinatown. Jacob Riis described Mulberry Bend as "the foul core of New York's slums". During this time period "Immigrants of the late 19th century usually settled in ethnic neighborhoods". Therefore, the "mass immigration from Italy during the 1880s" led to the large settlement of Italian immigrants in lower Manhattan. The results of such migration had created an "influx of Italian immigrants" which had "led to the commercial gathering of their dwelling and business".

Bill Tonelli from New York magazine said, "Once, Little Italy was like an insular Neapolitan village re-created on these shores, with its own language, customs, and financial and cultural institutions." Little Italy was not the largest Italian neighborhood in New York City, as East Harlem (or Italian Harlem) had a larger Italian population. Tonelli said that Little Italy "was perhaps the city's poorest Italian neighborhood".

In 1910 Little Italy had almost 10,000 Italians; that was the peak of the community's Italian population. At the turn of the 20th century, over 90% of the residents of the Fourteenth Ward were of Italian birth or origins. Tonelli said that it meant "that residents began moving out to more spacious digs almost as soon as they arrived". Such a vastly growing community impacted the "U.S. labor movement in the 20th century" by making up much of the labor population in the garment industry.

After World War II, many residents of the Lower East Side began moving to Brooklyn, Staten Island, eastern Long Island, Westchester and New Jersey. Chinese immigrants became an increased presence after the U.S. Immigration Act of 1965 removed immigration restrictions, and the Manhattan Chinatown to Little Italy's south expanded. In 2004, Tonelli said, "You can go back 30 years and find newspaper clips chronicling the expansion of Chinatown and mourning the loss of Little Italy."

Before 2004, several upscale businesses entered the northern portion of the area between Houston and Kenmare Street. Tonelli said, "Real-estate prices zoomed, making it even tougher for the old-timers—residents and businesspeople alike—to hang on." After the September 11 attacks in 2001, areas below Houston Street were cut off for the rest of the fall of 2001. The San Gennaro feast, scheduled for September 13, was postponed. Business from the Financial District dropped severely, due to the closure of Park Row, which connected Chinatown and the Civic Center; as a result, residents in Little Italy and Chinatown suffered. Tonelli said the post-9/11 events "strangely enough, ended up motivating all these newfangled efforts to save what's left of the old neighborhood".

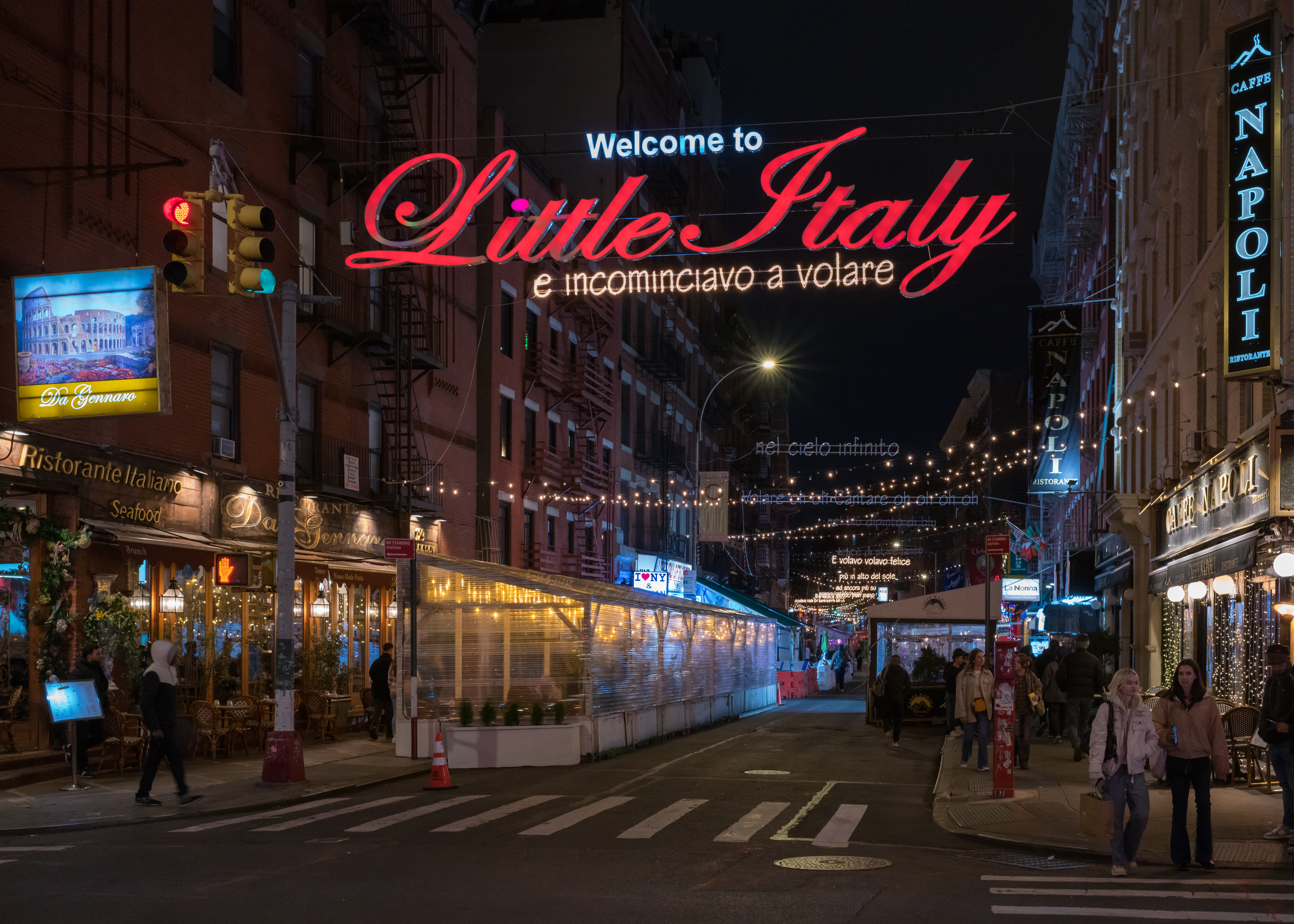
Mulberry Street, Little Italy, in 2023

In 2004 Tonelli said, "Today, Little Italy is a veneer—50 or so restaurants and cafés catering to tourists, covering a dense neighborhood of tenements shared by recent Chinese immigrants, young Americans who can't afford Soho, and a few remaining real live Italians." This sentiment has also been echoed by Italian culture and heritage website ItalianAware. The site has called the dominance of Italians in the area "relatively short-lived". It attributes this to the quick financial prosperity many Italians achieved, which allowed them to leave the cramped neighborhood for areas in Brooklyn and Queens. The site also goes on to state that the area is currently referred to as Little Italy more out of nostalgia than as a reflection of a true ethnic population.

In 2010, Little Italy and Chinatown were listed in a single historic district on the National Register of Historic Places. Little Italy, by this point, was shrinking rapidly.

== Demographic changes ==
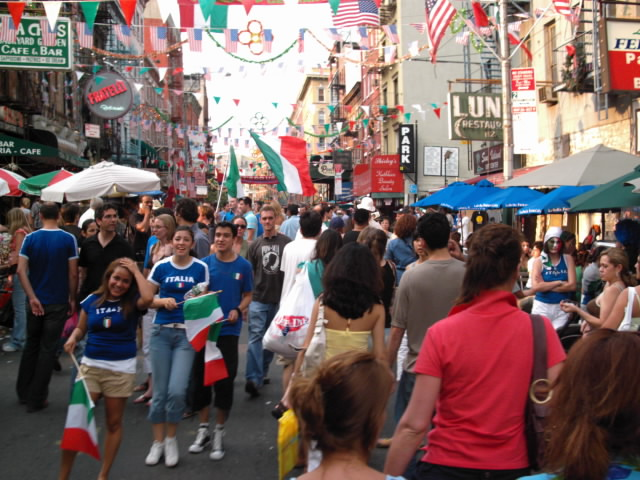
People in Little Italy celebrating after the Italian football team won the 2006 FIFA World Cup

The New York Times sent its reporters to characterize the Little Italy/Mulberry neighborhood in May 1896:

They are laborers; toilers in all grades of manual work; they are artisans, they are junkman, and here, too, dwell the rag pickers. ... There is a monster colony of Italians who might be termed the commercial or shop keeping community of the Latins. Here are all sorts of stores, pensions, groceries, fruit emporiums, tailors, shoemakers, wine merchants, importers, musical instrument makers. ... There are notaries, lawyers, doctors, apothecaries, undertakers. ... There are more bankers among the Italians than among any other foreigners except the Germans in the city.

Since the late 1960s, when the United States allowed immigration from China, Chinatown's traditional boundary at Canal Street has inched northward into Little Italy. By the 1990s, while many Italian business remained, the blocks between Canal and Kenmare Streets had taken on a feel of Chinatown, though locals continue to refer to the area (including Nolita) as Little Italy.

As of the 2000 census, 1,211 residents claiming Italian ancestry lived in the three census tracts that make up Little Italy. Those residents comprised 8.25% of the population in the community, which is similar to the proportion of those of Italian ancestry throughout New York City as a whole. Bill Tonelli of New York magazine contrasted Little Italy with the Manhattan Chinatown; in 2000, of the residents of the portions of Chinatown south of Grand Street, 81% were of Chinese origins.

In 2004, Tonelli revisited the issue, saying, "Little Italy may always endure as an open-air theme park of nineteenth- and twentieth-century European immigration to the Lower East Side ... But you'll spend a long time in the neighborhood before you hear anyone speak Italian, and then the speaker will be a tourist from Milan." Tonelli added, "You have to slow your gaze to find the neighbors in this neighborhood, because they're so overwhelmed and outnumbered by the tourists. But once you focus, you can see them, standing (or sitting) in the interstices, taking in the scene, like the group of men, mostly senior citizens, loitering contentedly under an awning on Mulberry Street."

By 2010 the U.S. Community Survey found that none of the people living in Little Italy were born in Italy, and 5% of residents identified as Italian American.

== Events ==
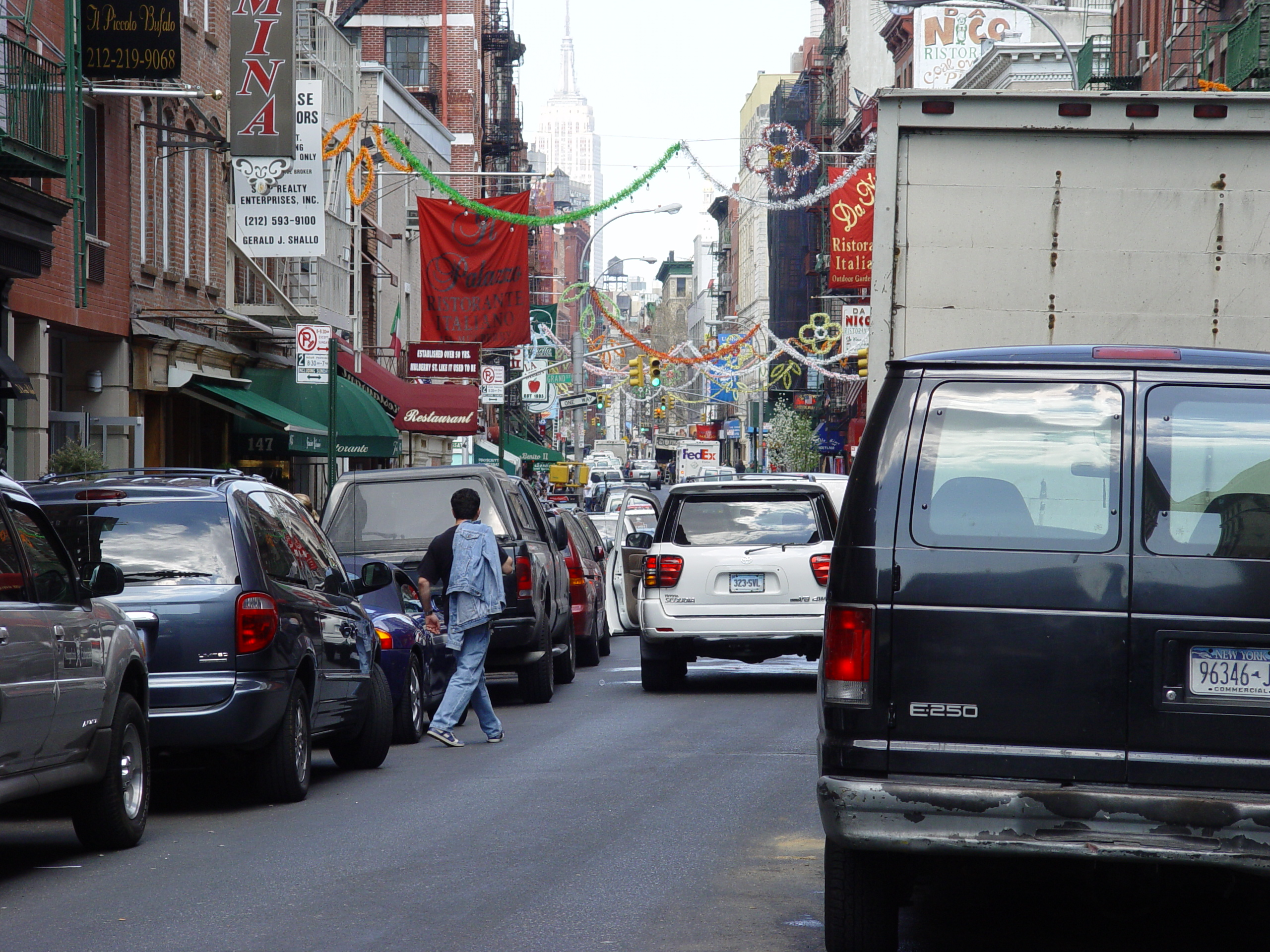
Mulberry Street in Little Italy in April 2005

The Feast of San Gennaro is an annual celebration of Italian culture and the Italian-American community. The feast began in 1926 as a one-day religious commemoration established by Italian immigrants from Naples to celebrate their patron saint, San Gennaro. The modern feast is celebrated as a large street fair, lasting 11 days, that takes place along Mulberry Street.

The Feast of the Seven Fishes, an Italian-American Christmas Eve tradition, is thought to have originated in Little Italy in the late 1800s.

== Organized crime and the Mafia ==
- Ignazio "The Wolf" Lupo (a Morello crime family boss operated in Little Italy from late 1890s-1920s)
- Paolo Antonio "Paul Kelly" Vaccarelli (founder of the Five Points Gang, who operated in Little Italy in the early twentieth century)
- Michele "Big Mike" Miranda (a Capo in the Genovese crime family operated in the neighborhood from the 1950s into the late 1960s)
- Peter DeFeo (a Genovese crime family capo who operated an illegal Italian lottery in the 1960s into the 1970s)
- Matthew "Matty the Horse" Ianniello, a Genovese crime family capo operated from his restaurant Umberto's Clam House in the 1970s
- John Gotti, boss of the Gambino crime family operated from the Ravenite Social Club in the late 1980s into the early 1990s

== Notable people ==
- Robert De Niro, actor and film producer
- Gianni Russo, actor and singer
- Catherine Scorsese, actress
- Charles Scorsese, actor
- Martin Scorsese, filmmaker

== In popular culture ==
Little Italy is the locale of the fictional Corleone family depicted in the novel The Godfather and the film trilogy based on it. It is also the setting for the Martin Scorsese film Mean Streets (1973), starring Harvey Keitel and Robert De Niro, the latter of whom also grew up in the neighborhood, and the Luc Besson film Léon: The Professional (1994), starring Jean Reno, Gary Oldman, and Natalie Portman. It is also depicted in the series finale of The Sopranos, titled "Made in America", where a character walks down a block and finds himself in Chinatown, demonstrating how Little Italy has shrunk.

== See also ==
- Feast of San Gennaro, a religious commemoration
- List of Italian-American neighborhoods
- List of Little Italy neighborhoods around the world
- Little Australia

Other Italian American neighborhoods in New York City:

- In Manhattan - East Harlem (Italian Harlem, Pleasant Avenue), Greenwich Village, and Nolita
- In the Bronx - Fordham (Arthur Avenue), Belmont, Morris Park, Country Club, and Pelham Bay
- In Brooklyn - Bensonhurst, Bay Ridge, Dyker Heights, Bath Beach, Gravesend, South Brooklyn (especially Carroll Gardens), East Williamsburg and other neighborhoods
- In Queens - Howard Beach, Ozone Park, Middle Village, Astoria, and other neighborhoods
- In Staten Island - Rosebank and other neighborhoods
