= Matthew Ianniello =

American mobster (1920–2012)

- Born: June 18, 1920; New York City, U.S.
- Died: August 15, 2012 (aged 92); Old Westbury, New York, U.S.
- Resting place: Cemetery of the Holy Rood, Westbury, New York, U.S.
- Occupation: Mobster
- Spouse: Beatrice May
- Children: 4
- Allegiance: Genovese crime family
- Convictions: Racketeering (1988); Racketeering (2006)
- Penalty: Sentenced to 13 years imprisonment Concurrently sentenced to 18 months imprisonment (state) and two years imprisonment (federal)

Matthew Joseph "Matty the Horse" Ianniello (June 18, 1920 – August 15, 2012) was an American mobster with the Genovese crime family of New York City, of which he was once the acting boss. During the 1970s and 1980s, Ianniello controlled the lucrative sex industry centered near Times Square. He was convicted of bid rigging in construction, skimming union dues, and extorting protection money from bar owners, pornography peddlers, and topless dancers as Times Square became filled with peep shows.

== Early life ==
Ianniello was born in 1920 in Little Italy, Manhattan and was one of eight children of his Italian immigrant parents.

Ianniello allegedly got his nickname "Matty The Horse" in a youth baseball game. During one game, the opposing pitcher threw a hard pitch into the face of the batter. A fight erupted in which Ianniello knocked down the pitcher, who was older and taller than he. After this episode, someone remarked about Ianniello: "That boy is as strong as a horse."

He worked as a waiter in a restaurant owned by his uncle in the Brooklyn dockyards, and then as a longshoreman in the Brooklyn Navy Yard, then joined the United States Army in 1943. He received a Purple Heart and a bronze star for valor in combat in the Asiatic-Pacific Theater. After World War II, he and an uncle became partners in a second restaurant, Matty's Towncrest Restaurant.

Ianniello was married to Beatrice May and the couple had four children.

In 1951, Ianniello was arrested on charges of possessing heroin, but the charges were dropped.

In 1960, Ianniello became partners with Edward L. DeCurtis, a longtime associate, in running private after-hours drinking clubs for gay men. Ianniello eventually owned a string of clubs and nightclubs for gay men, including the Gilded Grape and the Haymarket.

== Career ==
In the 1960s, Ianniello joined the Genovese crime family, then run by imprisoned boss Vito Genovese. Ianniello's sponsor was mobster and future acting boss Frank "Funzi" Tieri.

Ianniello eventually controlled Amalgamated Transit Union, bus drivers Local 1181, giving him the power to extort payments from school bus companies in New York City as well as the union drivers.

On February 2, 1965, Ianniello was indicted on contempt of grand jury charges for refusal to testify. However, the charges were dismissed in 1966.

In the early 1970s, Ianniello was promoted to caporegime. Ianniello then controlled over 80 restaurants and sex-oriented clubs in New York City, including most of those located in the Times Square area of Manhattan. Officially, he still had a respectable job with the union.

In 1972, Colombo crime family rebel Joe Gallo was murdered at the restaurant Umberto's Clam House in Little Italy, Manhattan, owned by Matthew's father, Umberto Ianniello. On April 7, 1972, early in the morning, Gallo, who was celebrating his birthday with family and friends, arrived at Umberto's. When he arrived, Gallo greeted Matthew. A Colombo associate sitting at the bar saw Gallo and immediately left to notify his superiors.

Soon afterward, several armed Colombo associates stormed into the restaurant and shot and killed Gallo. Matthew was in the kitchen at the time and missed the entire attack. Matthew later claimed no prior knowledge of the attack and was not charged. The Nevada Daily Mail reported Matthew was at the cash register that night but "the proprietor dove into the kitchen and lay on the tile floor with his hands over his eyes as soon as Sonny Pinto (Carmine Dibiasi) and two out-of-town torpedoes known only as Cisco and Benny came in the side door blasting. The next thing he knew, Pete "The Greek" Diopoulis, a Gallo bodyguard, was pushing a gun in his face and pulling the trigger but only clicks came out because it had been emptied trying to save Joey."

In 1985, along with Vincent Asaro, he was alleged to have demanded up to $1 million when seedy properties owned by gangster Michael Zaffarano were sold to legitimate real estate developers.

=== Indictments ===
On February 28, 1985, Ianniello was indicted in federal court in New York on charges of racketeering involving the operation of several restaurants, bars and carting companies. Using telephone tapping on Ianniello's office, agents assembled proof that he was skimming over $2 million from bars and restaurants and a topless bar in which he owned interests. On December 30, 1985, Ianniello was convicted on numerous counts and on February 16, 1986, Judge Edward Weinfeld sentenced Ianniello to six years in federal prison.

On May 13, 1986, Ianniello was acquitted on all charges in the 1986 indictment on racketeering in the garbage industry. On May 17, 1986, Ianniello was indicted in federal court in New York on new charges of labor racketeering, construction bid rigging, extortion, gambling, and murder conspiracies.

On May 18, 1988, Ianniello was indicted again in Newark, New Jersey on racketeering charges involving the 1984 Genovese takeover of a gravel company in Edgewater, New Jersey. On October 13, 1988, Ianniello was sentenced to 13 years in federal prison after being convicted of the 1986 bid rigging racketeering charges.

=== Acting boss ===
In 1995, Ianniello was released from prison. When Genovese boss Vincent "the Chin" Gigante went to prison in 1997, Ianniello became acting boss. By 1998, Ianniello was deeply involved in Amalgamated Transit Union Local 1181, a bus drivers union. Through the union, Ianniello forced a medical center to pay $100,000 to renew their lease and then make regular cash payments in order to keep it.

=== Waste management industry ===
Between 2001 and 2005, Ianniello received protection fees of more than $800,000 from Connecticut waste management businesses owned by James Galante. On July 27, 2005, Ianniello was indicted on racketeering charges in New York involving extortion and loansharking. The agents that arrested Ianniello at his home reported that he was watching the film The Godfather Part III at the time. On June 10, 2006, Ianniello was indicted in federal court in New Haven on charges of racketeering involving trash hauling in Southwestern Connecticut. He pleaded guilty to the New York racketeering charges and received an 18-month prison sentence and he pleaded guilty in Connecticut and was sentenced to two years in federal prison to run concurrent with the 18 month New York sentence. Ianniello's attorney had asked for leniency, saying Ianniello had cancer and was in generally poor health. On April 3, 2009, after serving 2 years, Ianniello was released from the Federal Medical Center, Butner.

== Death ==
On August 15, 2012, Ianniello died at age 92 at his home in Old Westbury, New York of health problems related to heart ailments and other illnesses, including prostate cancer.

== In popular culture ==
Matthew Ianniello is portrayed by actor Garry Pastore in the 2017 HBO series The Deuce.

American Mafia
Preceded by Dominick "Quiet Dom" Cirillo	Genovese crime family Acting boss 1998–2005	Succeeded by Daniel "Danny the Lion" Leo as acting boss
