= Vincent Cafaro =

Italian-American mobster (1933–2004)

- Born: August 27, 1933; Gambugliano, Kingdom of Italy
- Died: December 2004 (aged 71); Greensboro, North Carolina, U.S.
- Other name: The Fish
- Occupation: Mafia Soldier
- Allegiance: Genovese crime family

Vincent Cafaro (August 27, 1933 – December 2004) was an Italian-American mobster who was a soldier in the Genovese crime family of New York City under the tutelage of acting boss Anthony "Fat Tony" Salerno, until becoming a government confidential informant and cooperating witness in 1986.

== Labor racketeer ==
Cafaro was born in the small town of Gambugliano near Vicenza, Italy, but grew up in the East Harlem section of New York, United States. In 1974, Cafaro became a "made man", or full member, in the Genovese crime family and was assigned to Anthony "Fat Tony" Salerno's crew, based out of the Palma Boys Social Club in East Harlem.

From 1974 to 1986, Cafaro was influential in the N.Y.C. District Council of Carpenters rackets. Cafaro received payoff money from fellow East Harlem native and Genovese captain Vincent DiNapoli. DiNapoli's top associate, Teddy Maritas, was President of the District Council. Cafaro's representative in the Carpenters Union was Onofrio "Frankie Zip" Acramone. Cafaro would have Acramone set up meetings with other union officers to gain further influence in the union. Cafaro and Acramone worked with DiNapoli's representatives Attilio Bitondo, Anthony Fiorino, and Gambino crime family representative Carmine Fiore on labor rackets during the construction of the Javits Convention Center in Hell's Kitchen.

DiNapoli eventually went to prison for labor racketeering; Maritas disappeared after being indicted. While DiNapoli was in prison, he learned that Cafaro was gaining influence in the District Council. Worried about his turf, DiNapoli took the problem to boss Salerno. Salerno sided with DiNapoli and forced Cafaro to return the union rackets to DiNapoli.

== Government informant ==
On March 21, 1986, Cafaro and 14 other mobsters were indicted on federal racketeering charges involving concrete supply companies. In September 1986, while in jail awaiting trial, Cafaro contacted the government about becoming a government informant and witness. In October 1986, the government released Cafaro on bail. From October 1986 to March 1987, Cafaro attended family meetings wearing a recording device. On March 20, 1987, the government revealed in court that Cafaro was now working for them. Cafaro's son Thomas was indicted in the same case, and the government offered him a plea agreement also. However, Thomas decided to plead guilty and go to prison to assure the Genovese family that he was still loyal.

Cafaro later testified about the Genovese family involvement in large-scale labor racketeering; their control over the New York District Council of Carpenters; and the family's organizational structure. Cafaro also exposed the Genovese family's control over the New York Coliseum and the Javits Center. He also described how Salerno, after suffering a stroke, became a figurehead for new boss Vincent "the Chin" Gigante. This maneuver helped deflect law enforcement scrutiny of Gigante's affairs. When Salerno was eventually convicted and sentenced to 100 years in prison in the Commission case, the real family boss, Gigante, was still free.

In October 1987, Cafaro told prosecutors that he was breaking his cooperation deal because of fear for his immediate family. On February 20, 1988, Cafaro refused to answer some questions in court during a drug trial for Liborio "Barney" Bellomo and three other defendants. In 1989 and 1990, Cafaro testified against Gambino boss John Gotti and then disappeared into the Federal Witness Protection Program.

== Death ==
Cafaro later lived in Greensboro, North Carolina, under the Federal Witness Protection Program. He died there in late December 2004, at the age of 71. His body was later returned to Staten Island in New York City, where he was buried.
