= Valachi hearings =

1963 congressional hearings investigating organized crime and the Mafia

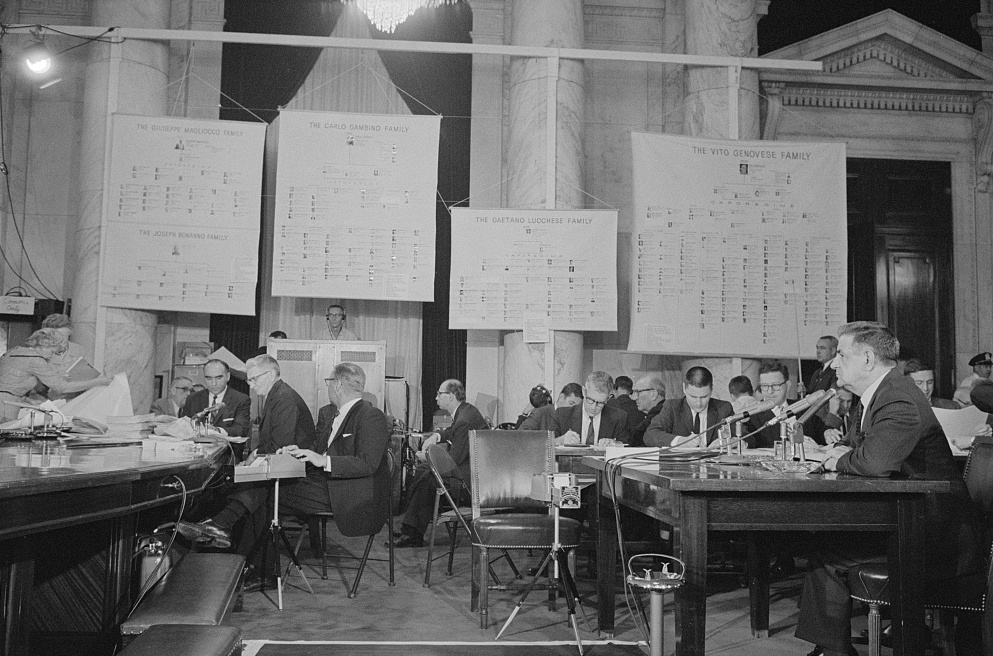
Joseph Valachi testifying at the hearings with mafia organizational charts behind him

The Valachi hearings, also known as the McClellan hearings, investigated organized crime activities across the United States. The hearings were initiated by Arkansas Senator John L. McClellan in 1963. Named after the major government witness against the American Mafia, foot soldier and made man Joseph Valachi, the trial exposed American organized crime to the world through Valachi's televised testimony. At the hearings, Valachi was the first member of the Italian-American Mafia to acknowledge its existence publicly, and is credited with popularization of the term cosa nostra. The trial also exposed the hierarchy of the American Mafia, including the Five Families and The Commission.

== Overview ==
In October 1963, Valachi testified before Senator John L. McClellan's congressional committee on organized crime, the Permanent Subcommittee on Investigations of the U.S. Senate Committee on Government Operations. He gave the American public a firsthand account of Mafia activities in the United States.

Valachi had agreed to testify against the mafia and expose its dark past after landing in prison for a heroin charge alongside his boss, Don Vito Genovese. Fueled by anger at his former organization and a fear for his life after receiving the kiss of death from Genovese, Valachi reached out to testify, knowing the only other likely option was death.

A low-ranking member of the New York–based Genovese crime family, Valachi was the first ever government witness to come forward from the American Mafia itself. Before Valachi, federal authorities had no concrete evidence that the American Mafia even existed. His disclosures did not lead directly to the prosecution of many high-ranking Mafia leaders, but he was able to provide many details of its history, structure, operations and rituals, as well as naming many active and former members of the major crime families.

Valachi testified on the details of his day-to-day life in organized crime in a first-time-ever public account of life as a soldier of La Cosa Nostra, including its rites of initiation. These televised hearings brought home to average Americans the violence and intimidation routinely used by the Mafia to further and protect its criminal enterprises.

== Disclosures ==
Much of the knowledge accessible to the public today about the American Mafia was first disclosed in Joseph Valachi's televised testimony.

The organizational structure of Cosa Nostra in accordance with Valachi's testimony.

Valachi disclosed that the Mafia was called Cosa Nostra ("our thing" or "this thing of ours" in Italian) among the members of the organization and that the term "Mafia" was an outsider term. At the time, Cosa Nostra was understood as a proper name, fostered by the FBI and disseminated by the media. The designation gained wide popularity and almost replaced the term Mafia. (in Italy, the article la precedes the general "mafia" term but is not used before "Cosa Nostra").The term was often prefixed with "La" (La Cosa Nostra), in the media and even in the FBI, but this is inconsistent with the Italian language as well as Valachi's testimony.

He also revealed the organizational structure of the Mafia. Valachi revealed that "soldiers" are organized into "regimes" and led by a "caporegime" ("lieutenant"). The regimes, in turn, are organized into "families" and bossed by "capos" (bosses), each representing a geographic area, who make up Cosa Nostra's Commission, the final arbiter of the syndicate's affairs, and who act as a sort of Cosa Nostra Executive Board.

While revealing the existence of these syndicates and that they were referred to as "families", he also disclosed the names of New York City's Five Families. According to Valachi, the original bosses of the Five Families were Charles Luciano, Tommaso Gagliano, Joseph Profaci, Salvatore Maranzano and Vincent Mangano. At the time of his testimony in 1963, Valachi revealed that the current bosses of the Five Families were Tommy Lucchese, Vito Genovese, Joseph Colombo, Carlo Gambino, and Joe Bonanno. These have since been the names most commonly used to refer to the New York Five Families, despite years of overturn and changing bosses in each.

== Aftermath ==
The assassination of President Kennedy one month after the hearings took a lot of steam out of Robert Kennedy's war on the mafia. However, later, due in part to Valachi's disclosures, the United States Congress eventually passed two new laws to strengthen federal racketeering and gambling statutes to aid the Federal Bureau of Investigation's fight against mob influence. The Omnibus Crime Control and Safe Streets Act of 1968 provided for the use of court-ordered electronic surveillance in the investigation of certain specified violations.

The Racketeer Influenced and Corrupt Organizations (RICO) Statute of 1970 allowed organized groups to be prosecuted for all of their diverse criminal activities, without the crimes being linked by a perpetrator or all-encompassing conspiracy. Along with greater use of agents for undercover work by the late 1970s, these provisions helped the FBI develop cases that, in the 1980s, put almost all the major traditional crime family heads in prison.

== The Valachi Papers ==
In 1964, the US Department of Justice urged Valachi to write down his personal history of his underworld career. Although Valachi was only expected to fill in the gaps in his formal questioning, the resulting account of his thirty-year criminal career was a rambling 1,180-page manuscript titled The Real Thing.

Attorney General Nicholas Katzenbach authorized the public release of Valachi's manuscript. He hoped that publication of Valachi's story would aid law enforcement and possibly encourage other criminal informers to step forward. Author Peter Maas, who broke Valachi's story in The Saturday Evening Post, was assigned the job of editing the manuscript and permitted to interview Valachi in his Washington, D.C., jail cell.

The American Italian Anti-Defamation League promoted a national campaign against the book on the grounds that it would reinforce negative ethnic stereotypes. If the book's publication was not stopped they would appeal directly to the White House. Katzenbach reversed his decision to publish the book after a meeting with President Lyndon B. Johnson, an action that embarrassed the Justice Department.

In May 1966, Katzenbach asked a district court to stop Maas from publishing the book—the first time that a U.S. attorney general had ever tried to prevent publication of a book. Maas never published his edition of Valachi's original memoirs, but he did publish a third-person account based upon interviews he himself had conducted with Valachi. These formed the basis of the book The Valachi Papers, which was published in 1968. The book was made into the 1972 film The Valachi Papers starring Charles Bronson as Valachi.

Francis Ford Coppola, in his director's commentary on The Godfather Part II (1974), mentioned that the scenes depicting the Senate committee interrogation of Michael Corleone and Frank Pentangeli are based on Valachi's federal hearings and that Pentangeli is like a Valachi figure.
