= Initiation ritual (mafia) =

Ceremony to become a full member of the Mafia

To become a member of the Mafia or Cosa Nostra (both the original Sicilian Mafia or the Italian-American offshoot often known as the "American Mafia")—to become a "man of honor" or a "made man"—an aspiring member must take part in an initiation ritual or initiation ceremony. The ceremony involves significant ritual, oaths, blood, and an agreement to follow the rules of the Mafia. The first known account of the ceremony dates back to 1877 in Sicily.

The typical sequence of the ceremony, according to several distinct descriptions, has common features. First, the new recruit is led into the presence of other members and presented by a member. The association is explained, including its basic rules, then the recruit's finger is pricked with a needle by the officiating member. A few drops of blood are spilled on a card bearing the likeness of a saint, the card is set on fire, and finally, while the card is passed rapidly from hand to hand to avoid burns, the novice takes an oath of loyalty to the Mafia family. This ceremony may have been inspired by the oral legends of initiation rituals of the Sicilian sect Beati Paoli, popularized in 1909 by the William Galt serialized novel I Beati Paoli.

== In Sicily ==
The first known account of the ceremony dates back to 1877 in Monreale in an article in the Giornale di Sicilia in an account about the Stuppagghiari, an early Mafia-type organisation. Other early accounts were during a trial against the Fratellanza (Brotherhood) in Agrigento (1884) and the Fratuzzi (Little Brothers) in Bagheria (1889).

One of the first life accounts of an initiation ceremony was given by Bernardino Verro, a leader of the Fasci Siciliani, a popular social movement of democratic and socialist inspiration, which arose in Sicily in the early 1890s. To give the movement teeth and protect himself from harm, Verro joined the Fratuzzi in Corleone. In a memoir written many years later, he describes the initiation ritual he underwent in the spring of 1893:

[I] was invited to take part in a secret meeting of the Fratuzzi. I entered a mysterious room where there were many men armed with guns sitting around a table. In the center of the table there was a skull drawn on a piece of paper and a knife. To be admitted to the Fratuzzi, [I] had to undergo an initiation consisting of some trials of loyalty and the pricking of the lower lip with the tip of the knife: the blood from the wound soaked the skull.

Soon after Verro broke with the Mafia and, according to police reports, became their most bitter enemy. He was killed by the Mafia in 1915 when he was the mayor of Corleone.

== In the United States ==
As a result of the Apalachin meeting, the membership books to become a made man in the mob were closed in 1957 and were not reopened until 1976. The first known account of the ritual in the United States was provided in 1963 by Joe Valachi, who was initiated in 1930, in his testimony at the McClellan hearings. Valachi's was a high-profile case, and helped convince the country of the existence of the organization in the United States called the Cosa Nostra, also known as the Mafia. He provided the FBI with firsthand information about the inside of the Mafia, including one of the first ever descriptions of the induction ceremony.

=== Ceremony ===
==== Choosing new members ====
The Mafia solicits specific people for membership—one cannot just choose to join up. In Tommaso Buscetta's testimony for the Pizza Connection Trial, he was asked what he did to get into the Cosa Nostra. He answered, "I didn't make out any application to become a member—I was called, I was invited." Joe Valachi had an extended courtship before he finally consented to join. He was eventually swayed by the argument of Mafioso Bobby Doyle, who said that a solo career of crime was much more dangerous. Doyle said to Valachi, "Join us and you will be made. You will earn money and you are not to steal anymore." Things had been getting difficult for Valachi in terms of frequent arrests and other consequences of his lifestyle, and he acknowledged the logic of Doyle's argument.

==== Descriptions ====
The ceremony is a dinner or a meeting. Several people may be inducted at once. When inducted, "... they are 'made' or 'baptized' or 'get their badges.'" Other terms used are wiseguys, a friend of ours, good fellow, one of us, and straightened out.

Valachi gave the most well-known description of the ceremony:

I sit down at the table. There is wine. Someone put a gun and a knife in front of me. The gun was a .38 and the knife was what we call a dagger. Maranzano [the boss] motions us up and we say some words in Italian. Then Joe Bonanno pricks my finger with a pin and squeezes until the blood comes out. What then happens, Mr. Maranzano says, 'This blood means that we are now one Family. You live by the gun and the knife and you die by the gun and the knife.'

Valachi was inducted with three others. There were about 40 members present, so the new initiates could "meet the family."

During the Patriarca crime family's induction of 1989 that was taped by the FBI, several other details were discovered. Before the inductee Tortora took the oath, he was told that he would be baptized. "You were baptized when you were a baby, your parents did it. But now, this time, we gonna baptize you." The baptism seems to represent the new stage of life that is beginning. This is one example of the family mentality of the Mafia. It is implied that the Mafia is taking the place of the member's family, of his parents. Further evidence of this mentality can be seen when Tortora is asked if he would kill his brother for the Mafia. This mentality most likely comes about because members are giving their entire lives to the organization. The oaths themselves talk about the family bond, suggesting that the rules of secrecy represent the family loyalty as well as a sense of self-preservation. Despite rivalries, all mafia families are considered related. Even between groups in Sicily and New York City, there is a sense of brotherhood.

In another variation in Valachi's description in the 1989 induction recording, inductee Flamaro specifically had his trigger finger pricked—which affirms that there is symbolism in the gesture. After this, a compadre/buddy was chosen for him, and, unlike other ceremonies described, no mention was made of burning a picture of a saint. In Buscetta's testimony, he said that when his finger was pricked, the blood was transferred to a picture of a saint, which was then burned. Buscetta then swore that if he disobeyed the rules, "my flesh would burn like this saint." A variation on this oath is "As burns this saint, so will burn my soul. I enter alive and I will have to get out dead." Jimmy Fratianno, inducted in 1947, described the Capo pricking his finger and saying, "This drop of blood symbolizes your birth into our family, we are one until death." The ceremony is finished with a kiss administered to both cheeks of the new mafiosi.

In the past, it was said that to complete the induction process, the potential member was to kill someone, though the practice seems to have died out for the most part.

After becoming boss of the DeCavalcante crime family in New Jersey in 1962, Sam DeCavalcante altered longstanding parts in the induction ritual, abolishing the use of a gun, a knife and a burning holy card when "making" new members of his family as "he did not feel it was necessary", according to Vincent "Vinny Ocean" Palermo, a onetime de facto boss of the family who cooperated with the government. As per testimony from another DeCavalcante mobster-turned-government witness, Anthony Rotondo, when the DeCavalcante family later came under the control of the Gambino crime family, Gambino boss John Gotti ordered the DeCavalcante family to repeat their inductions of "made" members because they had failed to follow the rules during the original ceremonies and thus he considered them invalid.

=== Rules ===
The Mafia Code is remarkably similar to that of not only other crime organizations and societies, but also to that present in American prisons. Donald Cressey notes that it is basically the same as the thieves code, which he outlines as having five basic parts:

1. Be loyal to members of the organization. Do not interfere with each other's interest. Do not be an informer. ...

2. Be rational. Be a member of the team. Don't engage in battle if you can't win. ... The directive extends to personal life.

3. Be a man of honor. Respect womanhood and your elders. Don't rock the boat. ...

4. Be a stand-up guy. Keep your eyes and ears open and your mouth shut. Don't sell out. ... The 'stand-up guy' shows courage and 'heart.' He does not whine or complain in the face of adversity, including punishment, because 'If you can't pay, don't play.'

5. Have class. Be independent. Know your way around the world.

==== Women ====
Jimmy Fratianno was inducted to the mafia in 1947, and swore an oath similar to Valachi. Three rules were given to him: "You must never betray any of the secrets of this Cosa Nostra. You must never violate the wife or children of another member. You must never become involved with narcotics."

In the Patriarca ceremony, Joseph Russo also explained that you do not mess around with sisters, wives, or girlfriends, unless you have "honorable" intentions.

Buscetta also related how he was instructed about the "appropriate manner" to act. He said he was told to "be silent, not to look at other men's wives or women, not to steal and especially, at all times when I was called, I had to rush, leaving whatever I was doing." The penalty for breaking these laws was death.

==== Omertà ====
The most important rule is the Omertà, the oath of silence. It is a frequently broken rule, as seen by FBI informants, but also punishable by death. Biagio DiGiacomo emphasized the severity of Omertà when he said, "It's no hope, no Jesus, no Madonna, nobody can help us if we ever give up this secret to anybody, any kinds of friends of mine, let's say. This thing cannot be exposed."

==== Drug trade ====
Rules about drugs are reiterated in many accounts, where it is detailed that members must abstain from both using and selling drugs of any kind. In Joe Bonanno's 1983 autobiography he stated that neither he nor his family participated in the drug trade, calling it a "filthy business." These rules are often broken, as evidenced by the FBI, and it has been questioned whether this rule was ever enforced, or if it is simply a myth. Regardless, in more recent times there is little support for any abstinence from drug rackets on the part of the mafia. In New York City, the five crime families had a monopoly on the drug trade.

==== Introductions ====
Introductions were very particularly laid out. People not of the Mafia were introduced as "a friend of mine." Members were referred to as "a friend of ours." Never were they allowed to say who they were in an introduction, except in particular circumstances. When introduced, members no longer follow the tradition of kissing, because it attracted too much attention from authorities.

=== Exposure ===
==== Valachi and the McClellan Committee ====
Genovese soldier Joe Valachi was convicted of narcotics violations in 1959 and sentenced to 15 years in prison. Valachi's motivations for becoming an informer had been the subject of some debate: Valachi claimed to be testifying as a public service and to expose a powerful criminal organization that he had blamed for ruining his life, but it is also possible he was hoping for government protection as part of a plea bargain in which he was sentenced to life imprisonment instead of the death penalty for a murder, which he had committed in 1962 while in prison for his narcotics violation.

Valachi murdered a man in prison who feared that mob boss and fellow prisoner Vito Genovese had issued an order to kill him. Valachi and Genovese were both serving sentences for heroin trafficking. On 22 June 1962, using a pipe left near some construction work, Valachi bludgeoned to death an inmate who he had mistaken for Joseph DiPalermo, a Mafia member whom he believed had been contracted to kill him. After time with FBI handlers, Valachi came forward with a story of Genovese giving him a kiss on the cheek, which he took as a "kiss of death." A $100,000 bounty for Valachi's death had been placed by Genovese.

Soon after, Valachi decided to co-operate with the U.S. Justice Department. In October 1963, Valachi testified before Arkansas Senator John L. McClellan's Permanent Subcommittee on Investigations of the U.S. Senate Committee on Government Operations, also known as the Valachi hearings, stating that the Italian-American Mafia actually existed, the first time a member had acknowledged its existence in public. Valachi's testimony was the first major violation of omertà, breaking his blood oath. He was the first member of the Italian-American Mafia to acknowledge its existence publicly, and is credited with popularization of the term cosa nostra.

Although Valachi's disclosures never led directly to the prosecution of any Mafia leaders, he provided many details of the history of the Mafia, operations, and rituals; aided in the solution of several unsolved murders; and named many members and the major crime families. The trial exposed American organized crime to the world through Valachi's televised testimony.

==== Patriarca family ====
On 29 October 1989, in Medford, Massachusetts, the FBI taped an initiation ceremony of New England's Patriarca crime family. There had been some controversy surrounding this bugging, given that the warrant for the 'roaming bug' used to tape the ceremony was given on false information.

One source details that the members involved in this ceremony were the consiglieri Joseph Russo, who conducted parts of the ceremony; capo Biagio DiGiacomo, who administered the oaths; capos Robert F. Carrozza, Vincent M. Ferrara, and Charles Quintina (all from Boston); and Matthew Guglielmetti, from the Providence, Rhode Island area. Inductees included Robert DeLuca, Vincent Federico, Carmen Tortora, and Richard Floramo. Another newspaper article states that there were 17 Mafiosi present, including the then-current boss, Raymond Patriarca, Jr., and other high-ranking officials in the family.

The FBI surveillance of this ceremony was the tail-end of a five-year investigation of the crime families in the area, which resulted in a host of indictments and arrests. Among those indicted were Patriarca, Jr., DiGiacomo, Russo, Tortora, Ferrara, Carrozza, and Guglielmetti, all of whom were present at the ceremony. Additional big names of those that were indicted are Antonio L. Spagnola, Nicholas Bianco, Louis Failla, and John E. Farrell. Information from the ceremony was used in the case against the Mafiosi.

FBI Boston Mafia specialist Thomas A. Hughes speculated that the Patriarca crime family lost honor and favor as a result of the sacred ceremony being taped under their watch.

==== Bonanno family ====
In November 2015, Damiano Zummo, a reputed acting captain in the Bonanno crime family, was involved in the induction ceremony of an undercover police agent, which was secretly recorded, in Canada. Zummo played a major role in the ceremony and named others at a higher level in the organization on the recording. A Brooklyn court official later said, "The recording of a secret induction ceremony is an extraordinary achievement for law enforcement and deals a significant blow to La Cosa Nostra." The recording also led to the arrest of 13 mobsters in November 2017, including Domenico Violi of the Luppino crime family in Hamilton, Ontario, Canada, who was named underboss of the Buffalo crime family in October 2017.

== Sources ==
- Gambetta, Diego (1993). The Sicilian Mafia: The Business of Private Protection. London: Harvard University Press. ISBN 0-674-80742-1
- Ianni, Francis A. J., & Elizabeth Reuss-Ianni (1972). A Family Business; kinship and social control in organized crime. New York City: Russell Sage Foundation, ISBN 0-87154-396-6.
- Paoli, Letizia (2003). Mafia Brotherhoods: Organized Crime, Italian Style, New York: Oxford University Press ISBN 0-19-515724-9 (Review by Klaus Von Lampe) (Review by Alexandra V. Orlova)
