= The Alto Knights =

2025 film by Barry Levinson

- Theatrical release poster
- Directed by: Barry Levinson
- Written by: Nicholas Pileggi
- Produced by: Irwin Winkler; Barry Levinson; Jason Sosnoff; Charles Winkler; David Winkler
- Starring: Robert De Niro; Debra Messing; Cosmo Jarvis; Kathrine Narducci; Michael Rispoli
- Cinematography: Dante Spinotti
- Edited by: Douglas Crise
- Music by: David Fleming
- Production company: Winkler Films
- Distributed by: Warner Bros. Pictures
- Release date: March 21, 2025
- Running time: 123 minutes
- Country: United States
- Language: English
- Budget: $45–50 million
- Box office: $10.2 million

The Alto Knights is a 2025 American biographical crime drama film directed by Barry Levinson and written by Nicholas Pileggi. The film stars Robert De Niro in a dual role as 1950s mob bosses Vito Genovese and Frank Costello, with Debra Messing, Cosmo Jarvis, Kathrine Narducci and Michael Rispoli in supporting roles.

The Alto Knights was released in the United States on March 21, 2025, by Warner Bros. Pictures to mixed reviews from critics. It was a box-office bomb, grossing $10 million worldwide against its estimated $45–50 million budget.

== Plot ==
After a failed assassination attempt orchestrated by his ambitious underboss, Vito Genovese, Luciano family boss Frank Costello finds himself at a crossroads. Weary of the constant bloodshed and betrayals that define his life, Costello informs Genovese of his intention to retire and cede control of the Luciano family. However, Genovese, a man consumed by ambition and paranoia, refuses to believe Costello's intentions, suspecting a ruse. The poisoned well of distrust between them spills over, igniting a silent, deadly war.

Genovese's suspicion curdles into outright aggression when he orchestrates the brutal murder of Albert Anastasia, Costello's chosen successor, while he is sitting in a barber's chair. This act of shocking violence shatters the fragile peace and forces Costello to confront a terrifying reality: his life, and the life of his beloved wife Bobbie, are hanging by a thread. He realizes that the only way to ensure their safety is to dismantle the entire operation he painstakingly built, to tear down the empire that now threatens to consume him.

Costello understands that Genovese, driven by his overwhelming paranoia, sees him as a lingering threat to his true intention: to seize outright control of the Five Families as capo dei capi. In Genovese's twisted mind, Costello's perceived "mild-mannered" nature is simply a deceptive façade, masking a cunning and vengeful spirit poised to strike back for the failed hit. However, unlike Genovese, Costello is not governed by crude ambition and is willing to play the long game.

Costello formulates a plan, one arguably more audacious than a simple act of retribution within the Mafia's brutal code. He eschews the traditional route of murder, recognizing that Genovese has gained too many powerful allies who would surely seek vengeance. Instead, Costello opts for a more subtle, insidious approach, leveraging the increased scrutiny already focused on the mafia to orchestrate Genovese's incarceration.

The linchpin of Costello's plan lies in the fateful Apalachin meeting. While never definitively proven, circumstantial evidence suggests that Costello tipped off law enforcement, alerting them to the gathering of powerful mafia figures in the small New York town of Apalachin, where Genovese intends to legitimize his new position. Costello furthers the deception by deliberately delaying his arrival, making conspicuous coffee stops and engaging in leisurely apple-picking, all in an attempt to buy time for the authorities to arrive. His almost comical behavior, however, doesn't go unnoticed, sparking suspicion in his driver Richie Boiardo.

The assembled mobsters are caught completely off guard, panic and attempt to flee through the woods, leaving a trail of evidence behind. Law enforcement meticulously recorded license plate numbers, leading to the indictment and conviction of twenty attendees on conspiracy to obstruct justice charges for providing false statements about the purpose of the clandestine gathering. The raid at Apalachin exposed the inner workings of the American Mafia to the public, drawing unprecedented scrutiny and ultimately contributing to Genovese's downfall several years later when he is formally convicted of dealing in heroin. Costello, on the other hand, achieves his dream of a peaceful retirement and dies an old man.

== Cast ==
- Robert De Niro as:
  - Frank Costello, the crime boss of the Luciano crime family
  - Vito Genovese, the crime boss of the Genovese crime family
- Debra Messing as Bobbie Costello, Frank's wife
- Cosmo Jarvis as Vincent Gigante, a rising soldier in Vito's crew
- Kathrine Narducci as Anna Genovese, Vito's wife
- Michael Rispoli as Albert Anastasia, the boss of the Mangano family, member of the Commission, and a close ally of Frank
- Michael Adler as Charles W. Tobey, a United States Senator on the Kefauver Committee
- Ed Amatrudo as Rudolph Halley, a leading New York City councilman with ties to Frank
- Joe Bacino as Joe Profaci, the crime boss of the Profaci family and member of the Commission
- James Ciccone as Carlo Gambino, a powerful mobster who serves as Anastasia's underboss
- Anthony J. Gallo as Tommy Lucchese, the crime boss of the Lucchese family and a member of the Commission
- Wallace Langham as Estes Kefauver, a prominent United States Senator
- Belmont Cameli as Frankie Boy
- Louis Mustillo as Joseph Bonanno, the crime boss of the Bonanno family and a ruling member of the Commission
- Frank Piccirillo as Richard Boiardo, Vito's principal enforcer
- Tim Livingood as Waiter #4
- Matt Servitto as George Wolf, Frank's personal attorney
- Robert Uricola as Anthony "Tony Bender" Strollo, a mobster who serves as Vito's right-hand man

== Production ==
The film, initially titled Wise Guys, was in the works from as early as the 1970s but over the decades was passed on by every major studio. Warner Bros. Pictures began work on the film in May 2022 and gave it the greenlight that August. Nicholas Pileggi wrote the script and Barry Levinson directed the film starring Robert De Niro in a dual role. In October 2022, Debra Messing and Kathrine Narducci joined the cast. In January 2023, Cosmo Jarvis joined the cast.

The production used vehicle vinyl wraps on 1950s-era cars and trucks to make the vehicles look new in the film. Filming took place in December 2022 in Ohio. The production shut down part of US 35 in Greene County, as well as SR 123 in the greater Cincinnati area before moving to the suburbs of Cincinnati. In October 2023, the film was re-titled Alto Knights; a trailer released in January 2025 revealed the final title to be The Alto Knights, the name of an actual Mafia social club referred to in the opening minutes of the film.

== Release ==
The film was released on March 21, 2025. It was originally scheduled to be released on February 2, 2024, taking over the original release date of Warner Bros. Pictures Animation's Toto, and then on November 15, 2024. On October 24, 2023, Variety reported that, because of the 2023 SAG-AFTRA strike, Warner Bros. was considering delaying the film's release to 2025.

=== Home media ===
The film was released digitally on April 11, 2025 and on Blu-ray and DVD on May 27, 2025.

== Reception ==
=== Box office ===
As of September 9, 2026, The Alto Knights has grossed $6.1 million in the United States and Canada, and $4.1 million in other territories for a worldwide total of $10.2 million. Variety reported that between Alto Knights and Mickey 17 (which was itself estimated to lose $75–80 million), Warner Bros. would lose around $110 million.

In the United States and Canada, The Alto Knights was released alongside Snow White and Ash and was projected to gross $2–3 million from 2,651 theaters in its opening weekend. It ended up debuting to $3.2 million, finishing in sixth; 77% of the audience was over 35 years old, while 58% were men. In its second weekend the film made $1.1 million, dropping 65%. The following weekend the film was removed from 2,480 theaters down to 171; the 93.9% loss was the 11th-largest such drop in history.

=== Critical response ===
On the review aggregator website Rotten Tomatoes, 39% of 142 critics' reviews are positive, with an average rating of 5.2/10. The website's consensus reads: "A competent but tired retread of mob movie tropes, The Alto Knights pits De Niro vs. De Niro with no real victor emerging." Metacritic, which uses a weighted average, assigned the film a score of 47 out of 100, based on 41 critics, indicating "mixed or average" reviews. Audiences polled by CinemaScore gave the film an average grade of "B" on an A+ to F scale, while PostTrak reported that 44% of filmgoers would "definitely recommend" it.

In Variety, Peter Debruge wrote: "Though there's no shortage of whackings and other spectacular moments unfolding before DP Dante Spinotti's cameras, the tone of The Alto Knights is decidedly less glamorous than your typical gangster movie. ... Unlike The Irishman, which unconvincingly de-aged its cast via distracting CGI, this film relies on prosthetics and makeup to transform De Niro as needed. That approach works better, interfering less with the maestro's performance(s), while sleight of hand allows the actor to appear opposite himself in a handful of scenes." Frank Scheck in The Hollywood Reporter wrote: "If this film feels familiar, that's because it is. From its pedigree to its casting to its themes, Levinson's new effort comes across like a retread. ... Novelistic in its detail and talky to the extreme, the film feels longer than it is."

For Empire, Laura Venning gave the film 3/5 stars, writing: "It all feels like handsomely crafted Scorsese-lite, but enjoyably so, like sinking into a shabby but much-loved armchair. ... De Niro puts in a typically solid, commanding performance as big boss Frank but is clearly having more fun chewing the scenery beneath layers of prosthetics as the volatile Vito, ... Occasionally clunky and retrograde but in the same manner as a story told by a grandparent, The Alto Knights reminds us that De Niro will always be cinema's greatest gangster." Peter Bradshaw, in The Guardian, gave 2/5 stars, writing: "As Vito, De Niro is gloweringly resentful, taciturn, bad-tempered and wears glasses and a hat. As Frank, De Niro is gloweringly resentful, taciturn, slightly less bad-tempered and doesn’t wear glasses or a hat. ... There is a kind of solidity and force to the film in its opening act, but its interest dwindles and we get little in the way of either ambition or moment-by-moment humour."

Wendy Ide in The Observer gave 2/5 stars, writing: "Levinson hit on the bafflingly ill-advised idea of casting Robert De Niro in both of the two lead roles of Frank and Vito. Which, while it does make the picture distinctive, unfortunately doesn't make it good. A meandering Goodfellas-style narration, growled to camera by Frank, fails to boost the film's flagging energy, and since De Niro's approach is to deliver two very slightly different but equally hammy performances, the whole dual-role gimmick is more distracting than interesting. Still, if you must watch it, you can at least amuse yourself by spotting the join where De Niro-as-Frank's fake nose is glued on." In The Independent Clarisse Loughrey also gave 2/5 stars, writing: "Sure, The Alto Knights might provide double the De Niro, but you could easily achieve the same effect by playing Goodfellas and Casino on two screens side by side. It would be about as cohesive an experience." Justin Chang, writing for NPR, concluded that the film "doesn't seem to trust its own story" and that he was not "sure exactly what the movie gains from having one actor play both roles", but that "De Niro is clearly at home with this gangland material, and it's fun to watch him argue with himself."

=== Accolades ===
Accolades received by Smurfs
Award	Date of ceremony	Category	Recipient(s)	Result	Ref.
Golden Raspberry Awards	March 14, 2026	Worst Screen Combo	Robert De Niro as Frank Costello and Vito Genovese	Nominated	
