= The Valachi Papers =

The Valachi Papers may refer to:

- The Valachi Papers (book), 1968 book by Peter Maas
- The Valachi Papers (film), 1972 film based on the book
