= American Italian Anti-Defamation League =

Organization established in 1967

The American Italian Anti-Defamation League was a political advocacy group formed by a group of Italian Americans from New York City in 1967. It held a concert in New York City at which Frank Sinatra, the national chairman, sang for an audience of 20,000. The group's ostensible purpose was to prevent Italian Americans as a group from being defamed, primarily by being uniformly stereotyped as all being involved with or related to persons or activities associated with the Mafia.

The American Italian Anti-Defamation League were sued by the original Anti-Defamation League, a Jewish organization founded to discredit the blood libel, the Protocols of the Elders of Zion and other instances of anti-Semitism. The suit was based on the purported appropriation of the ADL's name in a way which would likely cause confusion between the two groups by members of the general public. The Italian group relinquished the name and eventually dissolved.

The American Italian Anti-Defamation League promoted a national campaign against the book The Valachi Papers on the grounds that it would reinforce negative ethnic stereotypes. The book was a biography written by Peter Maas, telling the story of former mafia member Joe Valachi, a low-ranking member of the New York–based Genovese crime family. The American Italian Anti-Defamation League vowed to appeal directly to the White House if the book's publication was not stopped. Attorney General Nicholas Katzenbach reversed his decision to publish the book after a meeting with President Lyndon B. Johnson; an action that embarrassed the Justice Department.

In May 1966, Katzenbach asked a district court to stop Maas from publishing the book—the first time that a U.S. attorney general had ever tried to ban a book. Maas was never permitted to publish his edition of Valachi's original memoirs, but he was allowed to publish a third-person account based upon interviews he himself had conducted with Valachi. These formed the basis of The Valachi Papers, which was published in 1968.

== See also ==
- Italian-American Civil Rights League
