= Jessica Bendinger =

American screenwriter and novelist

- Born: November 10, 1966 (age 58)
- Education: Columbia University (BA)
- Occupation(s): Screenwriter, novelist

Jessica Bendinger (born November 10, 1966) is an American screenwriter and novelist.

== Education ==
Bendinger graduated from Columbia University in 1988. She is a classmate of screenwriter Andrew W. Marlowe. While at Columbia, Bendinger interned for the music magazine SPIN. After graduation, she worked for MTV News.

== Career ==
In 1991, Bendinger directed a music video for Queen Latifah's song "Fly Girl." The video was nominated for a Billboard Music Award.

Bendinger has written several films, including 2000's Bring It On, 2004's First Daughter and 2006's Aquamarine. She was also a writer and creative consultant for Sex and the City, as well as a producer of the 2005 film The Wedding Date, starring Debra Messing. She wrote and directed Stick It, released in April 2006 as her directorial debut.

Bendinger is a former model who worked for designer Stephen Sprouse, and appeared on the runway in the film Slaves of New York.

Bendinger's first novel, The Seven Rays, was published in 2009 by Simon & Schuster. The story follows 17-year-old Beth Michaels, who uncovers elements of the supernatural on her journey of self-discovery.

In 2011, the Writers Guild of America filed an injunction against the creators of Bring It On: The Musical, arguing that Bendinger had rights in the licensing of the theater production. "In a complaint..., the Writers Guild of America accused the producers of the movie of exploiting the screenwriter’s rights by producing a new musical based on the story." They said they would allow the musical to proceed if Bendinger were properly credited and compensated.

In 2011, Bendinger co-wrote "Hurts to Think", a track on Miranda Lambert's album Four the Record; and "Mostly Grey", co-written with Emerson Hart, which appears on his 2014 album Beauty in Disrepair.

In 2019 Bendinger, alongside her friend Michael Seligman, a writer for RuPaul's Drag Race, hosted the podcast Mob Queens, uncovering the forgotten history of Anna Genovese, wife of mobster Vito Genovese, who testified against him in court and ran drag clubs in Greenwich Village.

== Awards and acknowledgments ==
She was named by Glamour Magazine as one of Hollywood's "Most Powerful Women Under 40" in 2005.

Bendinger was inducted into the Academy of Motion Pictures Arts and Sciences (AMPAS) in July 2014.

== Filmography ==
Year	Title	Writer	Director	Producer
2000	Bring It On	Yes	—	—
2001	Sex and the City	Yes	—	—
2002	The Truth About Charlie	Yes	—	—
2004	First Daughter	Yes	—	—
2005	The Wedding Date	—	—	Yes
2006	Aquamarine	Yes	—	—
2006	Stick It	Yes	Yes	—
