= The Valachi Papers (film) =

1972 film by Terence Young

- French film poster
- Directed by: Terence Young
- Screenplay by: Stephen Geller
- Based on: The Valachi Papers by Peter Maas
- Produced by: Dino De Laurentiis; Roger Duchet
- Starring: Charles Bronson; Lino Ventura; Joseph Wiseman; Jill Ireland; Walter Chiari; Gerald S. O'Loughlin; Amedeo Nazzari
- Cinematography: Aldo Tonti
- Edited by: Johnny Dwyre; Monica Finzi
- Music by: Riz Ortolani; Armando Trovajoli
- Production companies: Dino De Laurentiis Company; Euro-France Films
- Distributed by: Cineriz (Italy); S.N. Prodis (France); Cinema International Corporation (international)
- Release dates: 21 July 1972 (Ireland); 9 December 1972 (France); 13 December 1972 (Italy)
- Running time: 125 minutes
- Countries: Italy; France
- Languages: English; Italian
- Budget: $4.2 million
- Box office: $17,106,087

The Valachi Papers (Note: Italian: Joe Valachi - I segreti di Cosa Nostra, lit. 'Joe Valachi - The Secret of the Cosa Nostra'; French: Cosa Nostra - L'Affaire Valachi, lit. 'Cosa Nostra - The Valachi Affair') is a 1972 biographical crime film directed by Terence Young, which tells the story of Joseph Valachi, an American Mafia informant in the early 1960s who was the first-ever mafioso to acknowledge the organization's existence. The film stars Charles Bronson as Valachi and Lino Ventura as Vito Genovese, along with Jill Ireland, Walter Chiari, Joseph Wiseman, and Gerald S. O'Loughlin. It is an adaptation of the 1968 non-fiction book by Peter Maas, with a screenplay by Stephen Geller.

The film was an international co-production between the Italian producer Dino De Laurentiis and the French company Euro-France Films. It premiered on July 21, 1972, in Ireland. The Valachi Papers was a commercial success, but received mixed-to-negative reviews from critics, many of whom negatively compared it to The Godfather.

== Plot ==
Joseph Valachi is an aging prisoner in the Atlanta Federal Penitentiary, who was imprisoned for smuggling heroin. The boss of his crime family, Vito Genovese, is imprisoned there as well. Genovese is certain that Valachi is an informant, and gives him the "kiss of death," whereupon Valachi kisses him back. Valachi is also the recipient of an attempted attack in the shower days before, which might have been caused by Genovese.

Valachi mistakenly kills a fellow prisoner, Joseph Saupp, who he wrongly thinks is a mob assassin. Told of the mistake by federal agent Ryan, Valachi becomes an informant, and is then transferred to Quantico to begin telling Ryan all that he knows. He tells his life story in flashbacks, from when he was a young criminal to a gangster associating with bosses such as Salvatore Maranzano. Maranzano initiates Valachi into the Mafia, and then assigns Gaetano Reina to be Valachi's boss. Valachi serves Reina well until the day that Reina is murdered in a drive-by shooting during the Castellammarese War, forcing Valachi to hide out at Reina's house, where he meets and falls in love with Reina's daughter, Maria. At the funeral for Reina, Maranzano consoles Reina's widow by saying "I cannot bring back the dead. I can only kill the living." After the funeral, Joe Masseria--Reina's murderer--is himself killed by Lucky Luciano. Valachi then marries Maria after getting the blessing to do so by her mother Letizia.

Valachi's rise in the Mafia is hampered by his poor relations with his capo, Tony Bender. Bender orders the castration of Valachi's business partner, Dominick "The Gap" Petrilli for having relations with Genovese's wife Anna. Valachi shoots Petrilli to put him out of his misery.

The mayhem and murder continue to the present, with Valachi shown testifying before a Senate committee. He is upset with having to testify and attempts suicide, but in the end (according to information superimposed on the screen) outlives Genovese, who dies in prison.

== Cast ==
- Charles Bronson as Joseph "Joe" Valachi
- Lino Ventura as Vito Genovese
- Jill Ireland as Maria Reina Valachi
- Walter Chiari as Dominick “The Gap” Petrilli
- Joseph Wiseman as Salvatore Maranzano
- Gerald S. O'Loughlin as Ryan
- Guido Leontini as Tony Bender
- Amedeo Nazzari as Gaetano Reina
- Fausto Tozzi as Albert Anastasia
- Pupella Maggio as Letizia Reina
- Angelo Infanti as Lucky Luciano
- Alessandro Sperli as Joe Masseria
- María Baxa as Donna
- Franco Borelli as Buster from Chicago
- Anthony Dawson as Federal Investigator
- Arny Freeman as Ward Edison Jr
- Jason McCallum as Donald Valachi
- Robert Trout as Himself
- Sabine Sun as Jane (uncredited)

== Production ==
Producer Dino de Laurentiis acquired rights to the book by Peter Maas in 1969. He had to convince Charles Bronson to take the role of Joe Valachi. He reportedly turned it down at least twice before accepting it when he found out the character got to age from his late teens to early 60s. Bronson was also given a three-film contract that guaranteed him $1 million per picture plus a percentage of the gross. Before Lino Ventura was cast, Marcello Mastroianni was offered the role of Vito Genovese.

The film was shot in New York City and at De Laurentiis' studios in Rome. Production began on March 20, 1972. The scenes set at Sing Sing were shot at the actual prison, with real convicts appearing as extras.

Paramount, the film's original distributor, had planned to release the film in February 1973, but the premiere date was moved up to capitalize on the popularity of the similarly-themed film The Godfather. Bronson's opinion of Francis Ford Coppola's gangster epic, although he admired Marlon Brando's performance, was "The Godfather? That was the shittiest movie I've ever seen in my entire life." On The Dick Cavett Show however, he called The Godfather a good picture. Coincidentally, actor Angelo Infanti appeared in both films, playing Fabrizio in The Godfather and Lucky Luciano in The Valachi Papers.

== Historical inaccuracies ==
- The extent of Valachi’s relationship with Gaetano Reina (Amadeo Nazzari) is played up in the film. The real Valachi’s first goombah was Joseph Bonanno, not Reina. Valachi was sheltered by Reina, briefly, after Salvatore Maranzano’s death and later romanced his daughter. They were married before Reina’s death, not after.
- The name of Valachi’s wife (Jill Ireland) is changed from Mildred “Millie” Reina to Maria.
- Dominick "Gap" Petrilli (Walter Chiari) was killed over business matters, not over an affair with Vito Genovese (Lino Ventura)’s wife Anna. This is based on the murder of Steven Franse, whom Valachi killed on Genovese’s orders because he suspected he had had an affair with his wife Anna. In the film, Petrilli is ordered castrated, and only mercy-killed by Valachi. In fact, Petrilli was murdered in a bar on East 183rd Street in The Bronx by three gunmen, and it is unknown if Valachi was present.
- The closing narration states Valachi outlived Genovese by six months. In fact, Genovese predeceased Valachi by over two years.

== Release ==
The film premiered in Ireland on July 21, 1972. It was released in the United States on October 27, in France on December 7, and in Italy on December 13.

== Reception ==
=== Box office ===
The Valachi Papers grossed about $17 million domestically, generating theatrical rentals of $9.3 million.

=== Critical response ===
Reviews were mostly negative, as many critics inevitably compared the film unfavorably to The Godfather. Roger Greenspun of The New York Times wrote, "Often ludicrous and often just dull, Terence Young's The Valachi Papers has the look of a movie project that ran short of ideas before it was finished, and ran out of class almost before it was begun." A positive review in Variety called the film "a hard-hitting, violence-ridden documented melodrama of the underworld" that "carries a fine sweep that immediately projects it as an important crime picture." Roger Ebert of the Chicago Sun-Times gave the film two-and-a-half stars out of four and called it "an ambitious but not inspired movie about the mob." Gene Siskel of the Chicago Tribune awarded two stars out of four and wrote, "Generally, The Valachi Papers tries to cover too many years, and thus provides paper-thin treatment of each event. As a result, the film implies power and violence, but rarely shows it. The visual power of The Godfather has been replaced with meaningless names and dates." Kevin Thomas of the Los Angeles Times dismissed the film as "two hours of relentless tedium, interrupted from time to time by savage violence." Gary Arnold of The Washington Post declared the film "a stiff. It may be possible to make a duller gangster melodrama, but I would hate to sit through the attempt ... It takes considerable ineptitude to produce a gangster movie this enervating." John Raisbeck wrote in The Monthly Film Bulletin, "Inviting inevitable comparisons with The Godfather, Terence Young's film proves markedly, even surprisingly, inferior to Coppola's on every level. Young and his screenwriter Stephen Geller, though faithful in fact to Peter Maas' original document, have simply plodded through a catalogue of events, content to name names but failing to treat the material with any consistency of form or theme."

== Other media ==
=== In popular culture ===
- On season 2, episode 7 of The Bob Newhart Show, entitled "Old Man Rivers" that premiered on October 27, 1973," Bob Hartley (Bob Newhart), his wife, Emily (Suzanne Pleshette), Bob's receptionist and friend Carol Kester (Marcia Wallace), and her date Dr. Scott Rivers (Jeff Corey) go to see a film entitled Big Al, which is being promoted with the tagline, "If you liked The Godfather and The Valachi Papers," you'll love Big Al."
- In season 1, episode 21 of the 1970s television sitcom Maude, titled "The Perfect Couple", Walter Findlay (Bill Macy) tells Maude (Bea Arthur) that he loves her more today than he did yesterday. Maude's response is, "Oh, darling. Oh, Walter. You're so sweet and poetic. If Shakespeare had known you, he never would have written Romeo and Juliet. He would have written The Valachi Papers!"
- In season 5, episode 11 of the HBO series The Sopranos, titled "The Test Dream", Tony Soprano (James Gandolfini) holds a copy of the novel the movie is based upon during a complicated dream sequence. He is standing at a urinal next to corrupt police officer Vin Makazian (John Heard) who questions Tony's resolve in taking action. Tony holds up a copy of the book and replies, "I've done my homework."
