= Ernest Rupolo =

American mobster (1908–1964)

Ernest "the Hawk" Rupolo (1908 – August 24, 1964) was a New York mobster and hitman for the Luciano crime family, now the Genovese crime family. He would later turn informant and testify against then-capo and future boss Vito Genovese.

== The Boccia murder ==
In 1934, Genovese and Ferdinand Boccia had conspired to cheat a wealthy gambler out of $150,000 in a high-stakes card game. After the game, Boccia demanded a share of $35,000 because he had introduced the victim to Genovese. Rather than pay Boccia anything, Genovese decided to have him murdered. On September 19, 1934, Genovese, Rupolo and four associates allegedly shot and killed Boccia in a coffee shop in Brooklyn.

== Informant ==
In 1937, fearing prosecution for the Boccia murder, Genovese fled to Italy.

In the summer of 1944 in New York, Genovese was implicated in the Boccia murder by mobster Rupolo. Facing a murder conviction, Rupolo had decided to become a government witness.

On August 27, 1944, U.S. military police arrested Genovese in Italy during an investigation into his running of a black market ring. It was revealed that Genovese had been stealing trucks, flour, and sugar from the Army. When Agent Orange C. Dickey of the Criminal Investigation Division examined Genovese's background, he discovered that Genovese was a fugitive wanted for the 1934 Boccia killing. However, there was seemingly little interest from the Army or the federal government in pursuing Genovese.

After months of frustration, Dickey was finally able to make preparations to ship Genovese back to New York to face trial, but came under increasing pressure. Genovese personally offered Dickey a $250,000 bribe to release him, then threatened Dickey when the offer was refused. Dickey was even instructed by his superiors in the military chain of command to refrain from pursuing Genovese, but refused to be dissuaded.

On June 2, 1945, after arriving in New York by ship the day before, Genovese was arraigned on murder charges for the 1934 Boccia killing. He pleaded not guilty. On June 10, 1946, another prosecution witness, Jerry Esposito, was found shot to death beside a road in Norwood, New Jersey. Earlier, another witness, Peter LaTempa, was found dead in a cell where he had been held in protective custody.

Without anyone to corroborate Rupolo's testimony, the government's case collapsed, and the charges against Genovese were dismissed on June 10, 1946. In making his decision, Judge Samuel Leibowitz commented:

I cannot speak for the jury, but I believe that if there were even a shred of corroborating evidence, you would have been condemned to the (electric) chair.

== Death ==
On August 24, 1964, Ernest Rupolo's body was recovered from Jamaica Bay, Queens. His killers had attached two concrete blocks to his legs and tied his hands. It was widely assumed that Genovese had ordered Rupolo's murder for testifying against him in the 1934 Boccia murder trial. John Franzese was accused of murdering Rupolo as a favor to Genovese.
