= Kiss of death (mafia) =

Sign given by a mafioso boss

The kiss of death (Italian: Il bacio della morte) is the purported sign given by a mafioso boss or caporegime that signifies that a member of the crime family has been marked for death, usually as a result of some perceived betrayal. It is unclear how much is based on fact and how much on the imagination of authors, but it remains a cultural meme and appears in literature and films.

For example, in the film The Valachi Papers, Vito Genovese (Lino Ventura) uses the kiss of death to inform Joe Valachi (Charles Bronson) that his betrayal of "the family" is known, and that he will be executed.

The "kiss" has also been portrayed as a way to terrify someone into submitting to extortion or repaying debt.

== Origin ==
The origin is unknown, but an Italian source identifies the bacio della morte as the kiss given to the assassin delegated to "execute" a death sentence, as if to seal the solemn judgment and to wish success on the assignment. Some believe it refers to the kiss of Judas which was given to Jesus to betray him to the soldiers seeking him out. Its use goes back to at least the early 19th century in Sicily.

== In real life ==
While in prison, Vito Genovese gave Joe Valachi a kiss on the cheek, which, Valachi later testified, he believed was the "kiss of death".

== In literature ==
- The Valachi Papers by Peter Maas

== In film ==
- 1947 Kiss of Death directed by Henry Hathaway, original story by Eleazar Lipsky
- 1968 The Brotherhood, written by Lewis John Carlino.
- 1972 The Valachi Papers a.k.a. Cosa Nostra directed by Terence Young
- 1974 The Godfather Part II produced, directed, and co-written (with Mario Puzo) by Francis Ford Coppola, Michael Corleone gives his brother Fredo Corleone the kiss of death after he discovers Fredo's betrayal.
- 1986 The Professor directed by Giuseppe Tornatore, Raffaele Cutolo plants one on Alfredo Canale for his apparent betrayal in telling the police where they could arrest him.
- 1995 Kiss of Death directed by Barbet Schroeder, screenplay by Ben Hecht, Charles Lederer, and Richard Price

== In television ==
- In "The Scarface Mob", the pilot episode of The Untouchables, Al Capone and his senior lieutenants give the "kiss of death" to Jimmy Napoli, the man chosen to assassinate Federal Agent Eliot Ness.
- In "Bart the Murderer", an episode of The Simpsons, the Big Cheese gives Fat Tony the "kiss of death" after being served poorly-made Manhattans. Tony responds by saying, "The kiss of death, that's all I need!".
- In a later Simpsons episode, "Mayored to the Mob", Fat Tony asks Homer Simpson to give Mayor Quimby a gift for him, being that Homer recently became the Mayor's bodyguard. The gift is a kiss; Homer believes it is a gesture of goodwill, but Mayor Quimby, upon receiving it, recognizes it as the Mob's infamous kiss of death.
- In the Futurama episode "Hell Is Other Robots," Philip J. Fry receives the kiss of death from Big Vinny while delivering a package of subpoena orders on the Mob Planet. Fry expresses his naive belief that Big Vinny was actually homosexual.
- In the Sons of Anarchy episode "A Mother's Work," Jax Teller embraces Juice (before he turns himself into the police) and kisses him on the cheek and whispers "you betrayed me."
- In the Succession episode "This Is Not for Tears," Kendall gives Logan a kiss as he leaves before then betraying him.
- In the Teen Titans Go! episode "A Holiday Story", Baby New Year gives Santa Claus the "kiss of death" after Santa betrays him.

== See also ==
- Kiss of Judas
