= Peter LaTempa =

American mobster (1904–1945)

Peter LaTempa (1904 – January 15, 1945) was a New York mobster and associate of the Genovese crime family, who later agreed to become a government witness against Vito Genovese.

A local Brooklyn hoodlum, LaTempa was pressured to support the testimony of hitman Ernest "The Hawk" Rupolo in the government's case against Vito Genovese for the 1934 murder of gambler and Luciano crime family soldier Ferdinand "The Shadow" Boccia. Shortly after Genovese's escape to Sicily, LaTempa reportedly agreed to cooperate with the authorities because he believed that Genovese would never be prosecuted.

However, in 1944, U.S. military police in Sicily arrested Genovese for dealing in black market goods, and his status as a fugitive was uncovered shortly thereafter. On January 8, 1945, federal authorities announced that Genovese had been repatriated to New York. LaTempa immediately went to the Brooklyn district attorney's office and demanded protective custody. As a result, the authorities placed LaTempa in Raymond Street Jail. Less than a week after Genovese's return, LaTempa was found dead in his cell after taking medication for his gallstones. An autopsy allegedly revealed that he had ingested enough poison "..to kill eight horses." Those responsible for arranging LaTempa's murder by tampering with his medication were never apprehended. However, authorities were convinced that Genovese was behind the murder, as he was the one who stood most to gain from LaTempa's death. With LaTempa's sudden death, there was no one to corroborate Rupolo's testimony in the Boccia murder case, and the jury was subsequently forced to acquit Genovese.

The presiding judge, Samuel Leibowitz, stated before the court:

"I cannot speak for the jury, but I believe if there were even a shred of corroborating evidence you would have been condemned to the electric chair. By devious means, among which were the terrorizing of witnesses, kidnapping them, yes, even murdering those who would give evidence against you, you have thwarted justice time and again."

After applying for early release from prison, Rupolo himself would be found dead almost 20 years later, on August 24, 1964. He was recovered from Jamaica Bay, Queens with his hands bound and two concrete blocks attached to his legs. His murder was almost certainly in response to his having testified against Genovese.
