= Ashanti (1979 film) =

1979 action-adventure film by Richard Fleischer

- Theatrical release poster
- Directed by: Richard Fleischer
- Written by: Stephen Geller; George MacDonald Fraser (uncredited)
- Based on: Ébano by Alberto Vázquez-Figueroa
- Produced by: Georges-Alain Vuille
- Starring: Michael Caine; Peter Ustinov; Kabir Bedi; Beverly Johnson; Omar Sharif; Rex Harrison; William Holden
- Cinematography: Aldo Tonti
- Edited by: Ernest Walter
- Music by: Michael Melvoin
- Distributed by: Warner Bros. Pictures; Columbia Pictures
- Release date: April 12, 1979
- Running time: 118 minutes
- Countries: United States; United Kingdom; Switzerland
- Language: English
- Budget: $7.5 million

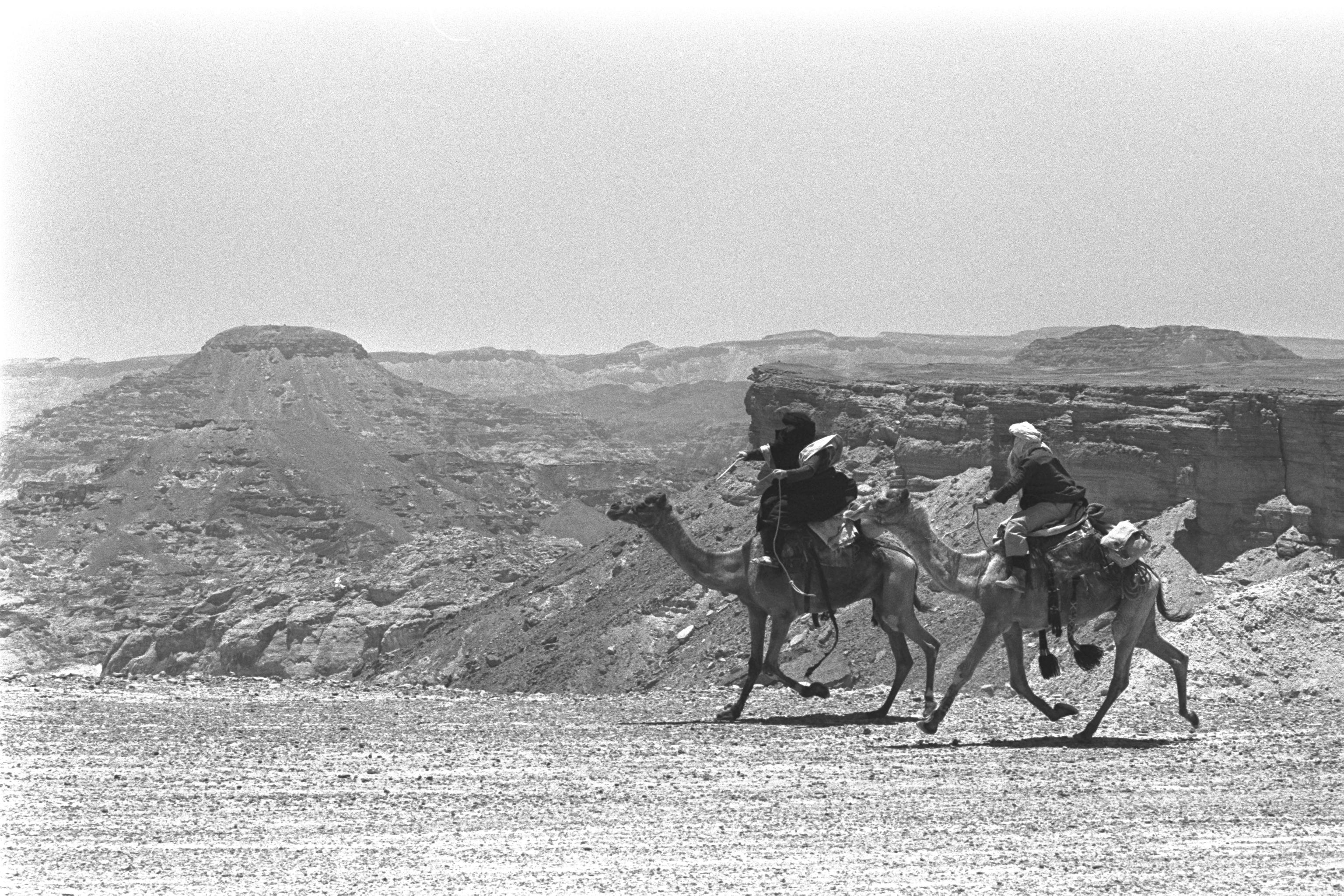
Camel riders near Eilat, extras on the set of "Ashanti".

Ashanti (also called Ashanti, Land of No Mercy) is a 1979 action adventure film directed by Richard Fleischer and starring Michael Caine, Peter Ustinov, Kabir Bedi, Beverly Johnson, Omar Sharif, Rex Harrison, and William Holden. It is based on the 1974 novel Ébano by Alberto Vázquez-Figueroa, with a screenplay written by Stephen Geller and an uncredited George MacDonald Fraser. The story is set against the background of modern-day slave trading, with Dr. David Linderby, a man who determinedly takes on a perilous journey in order to find his beautiful wife Anansa, who has been kidnapped by brutal slave traders.

Despite its impressive cast and setting (on location in the Sahara, and in Kenya, Israel, and Sicily), Ashanti was widely panned by critics upon release. Michael Caine was reportedly very disappointed with the project and claims it was the third worst film along with his previous films The Magus and The Swarm (despite appearing in other failures in the 1980s). It was one of Holden's final films, and the final film of cinematographer Aldo Tonti.

== Plot summary ==
David and Anansa Linderby are doctors with the World Health Organization. On a medical mission carrying out an inoculation program, they visit a West African village. While David takes photographs of tribal dancers, Anansa goes swimming alone. She is attacked and abducted by slave traders led by Suleiman, who mistake her for an Ashanti local. The police can do nothing to find her and David has almost given up hope when he hears rumors that Anansa has been kidnapped by Suleiman to be sold to an Arab, Prince Hassan. The African authorities deny that a slave trade even exists and David must find help in a shadowy world where the rescuers of slaves are as ruthless as the traders. As David tracks Anansa across Africa and the Sahara desert, he is helped by Brian Walker, a member of the Anti-Slavery League, Jim Sandell, a mercenary helicopter pilot and Malik, an Indian who seeks revenge on Suleiman.

== Cast ==
- Michael Caine as Dr. David Linderby
- Peter Ustinov as Suleiman
- Kabir Bedi as Malik
- Beverly Johnson as Dr. Anansa Linderby
- Omar Sharif as Prince Hassan
- Rex Harrison as Brian Walker
- William Holden as Jim Sandell
- Zia Mohyeddin as Djamil
- Winston Ntshona as Ansok
- Jean-Luc Bideau as Marcel
- Olu Jacobs as Commissioner Batak
- Johnny Sekka as Capt. Bradford
- Tariq Yunus as Faid
- Tyrone Jackson as Dongaro
- Marne Maitland as Touareg Chief
- Eric Pohlmann as Zeda El-Kabir
- Akosua Busia as Senoufo Girl

== Production ==
The project was announced in January 1978 with Richard C. Sarafian to direct, Michael Caine, Omar Sharif, Peter Ustinov and Telly Savalas to star. Ken Norton was offered a role in the film but turned it down.

The film was shot on location in Kenya starting in April. Two weeks into filming, director Richard Sarafian was fired and replaced by Richard Fleischer. The female lead Beverly Todd and cinematographer were fired and Savalas had to drop out of the cast. Fleischer arranged for the script to be rewritten. George MacDonald Fraser, who had recently adapted Tai-Pan for the producers into a script that was ultimately not used in the eventually released 1986 film, was commissioned to work on the script to help boost Sharif's role of Prince Hassan.

Director Fleischer and co-star Beverly Johnson were supposedly both removed from filming two-thirds of the way through the shoot due to sunstroke. However, an interview with Johnson included on the 2013 Severin Films Blu-ray edition of Ashanti makes no reference to these "removals", suggesting that they may belong to myth.

== See also ==
- Ashanti Empire
- List of films featuring slavery
- Arab slave trade
