= Gaetano Reina =

Sicilian-American mob boss

- Reina in the 1920s
- Born: September 27, 1889; Corleone, Sicily, Italy
- Died: February 26, 1930 (aged 40); New York City, U.S.
- Cause of death: Gunshot
- Resting place: Woodlawn Cemetery, Bronx, New York City, U.S.
- Other names: Tommy Reina; Tom Reina
- Occupation: Crime boss
- Known for: First Boss of the Lucchese crime family
- Successor: Bonaventura Pinzolo
- Spouse: Angelina Olivera (m. 1913)
- Children: 9
- Relatives: Joseph Valachi (son-in-law); Vincenzo Terranova (brother-in-law)
- Allegiance: Reina crime family

Gaetano Reina (Italian: [ɡaeˈtaːno reˈiːna]; September 27, 1889 – February 26, 1930) was an Italian-American gangster. He was an early American Mafia boss who was the founder of what has for many years been called the Lucchese crime family in New York City. He led the family until his murder on February 26, 1930, at the orders of Joe Masseria.

== Early years ==
Reina was born on September 27, 1889, in Corleone, Sicily, to Giacomo Reina and Carmela Rumore. In the early 1900s, the Reina family moved to New York City and settled on 107th Street in East Harlem. Reina, and his brother Antonio, began working with members of the Morello crime family.

He married Angelina Olivera. The couple had nine children: five sons Giacomo - who became a member of the Lucchese family - Henry, Sam, John and Bernard, and four daughters, Anna, Carmela "Mildred" Valachi - who married Joe Valachi in 1932 - Rose Bongrieco and Lucy Sterling. The family lived in a home on Rochambeau Avenue in the Norwood section of the Bronx.

In November 1914, wealthy poultryman Barnet Baff was murdered by competitors in the poultry industry who had hired Sicilian gunmen to commit the crime. At one point, Reina and Jack Dragna were implicated as the actual gunmen. It was later determined they were merely red herrings.

== Mafia boss ==
Reina had long been a captain in the Morello family, in charge of many men and operations within the Morello organization. As the Morello family fell into chaos in the 1910s, Reina, along with Salvatore D'Aquila and Joe Masseria, split off to form their own families. By 1920, he ruled as a boss of his own crime family, controlling criminal operations in The Bronx and parts of East Harlem. His crime family held a monopoly over the ice box distribution in The Bronx. Reina's underboss was Tommy Gagliano, a former Morello gang member.

In the late 1920s, Reina formed an alliance with Masseria, who had absorbed into his now powerful organization the remnants of the much weakened Morello family. In 1925, Salvatore Maranzano arrived in New York City and took over the Castellammare family, that operated out of the Williamsburg, Brooklyn. Reina switched sides and began supporting Maranzano. Masseria learned of Reina's betrayal and ordered Charles "Lucky" Luciano to arrange Reina's murder.

== Murder ==
On the evening of February 26, 1930, Reina left his mistress Marie Ennis' apartment on Sheridan Avenue in the Claremont section of the Bronx. Other sources claim he was leaving his aunt's apartment after dinner. He was ambushed and shot in the head with a double barreled shotgun, instantly killing him. Some suspect Vito Genovese while others suspect Joseph Pinzolo as being the perpetrators.

The two hit men left the weapon under a parked car and escaped. On his body, police found a handgun and $804 in cash, which is equivalent to $14,753 in 2025. Reina's death was one of the many factors of the start of the Castellammarese War between Masseria and Maranzano.

Reina is buried at Woodlawn Cemetery in the Bronx, New York.

== In popular culture ==
Films

- In The Valachi Papers (1972), Reina is portrayed by Amedeo Nazzari.
- In Gangster Wars (1982), Reina is portrayed by Joe Tornatore.
- In Mobsters (1991), Reina is portrayed by Chris Penn.

Novels

- In Martin A. Gosch and Richard Hammer's The Last Testament of Lucky Luciano (1975)

According to Charles Luciano, Reina was: "...a man of his word, he had culture, and was a very honorable Italian."

American Mafia
New title Crime family established by Reina	Lucchese crime family Boss c.1920–1930	Succeeded by Joseph Pinzolo
