= First Daughter (2004 film) =

- Theatrical release poster
- Directed by: Forest Whitaker
- Screenplay by: Jessica Bendinger; Kate Kondell
- Story by: Jessica Bendinger; Jerry O'Connell
- Produced by: John Davis; Mike Karz; Wyck Godfrey
- Starring: Katie Holmes; Marc Blucas; Amerie; Margaret Colin; Lela Rochon Fuqua; Michael Keaton
- Cinematography: Toyomichi Kurita
- Edited by: Richard Chew
- Music by: Michael Kamen; Blake Neely
- Production companies: Regency Enterprises; New Regency; Davis Entertainment
- Distributed by: 20th Century Fox
- Release date: September 24, 2004
- Running time: 105 minutes
- Country: United States
- Language: English
- Budget: $30 million
- Box office: $10.6 million

First Daughter is a 2004 American romance comedy film released by 20th Century Fox. It stars Katie Holmes as Samantha MacKenzie, daughter of the President of the United States, who enrolls at college and develops a relationship with another student (Marc Blucas). The film follows Samantha as she experiences a new sense of freedom during her time away from the White House, and the advantages and disadvantages of her college life. It co-stars Michael Keaton as the President of the United States and Amerie as Samantha's roommate, Mia Thompson.

The film was directed by Forest Whitaker, written by Jessica Bendinger and Kate Kondell from a story by Bendinger and Jerry O'Connell, and produced by John Davis. The film languished in "development hell" for five years, finally being completed and released eight months after the similar Chasing Liberty (2004). The film was a commercial failure upon its release, and received generally negative reviews.

== Plot ==
Samantha MacKenzie is the only child of U.S. President John MacKenzie. Due to her father's political career, she has been in the public eye her entire life and spent most of her high school years in the White House. Having to deal with a lack of privacy and public scrutiny, Sam has had a sheltered existence and her father has trouble giving her more freedom yet is too busy to spend time with her. Accompanied by Secret Service agents everywhere she goes, and with her father running for re-election, Sam finally believes she has the chance to break out of her cocoon when she is allowed to attend college in California.

There, Sam ends up sharing a dorm room with Mia Thompson, who is hesitant at first to room with the first daughter, but eventually warms to her. After her Secret Service agents tackle a student brandishing a water gun at a pool party and hastily evacuate her from the premises, she insists that her detail be reduced to just two agents, to which her father begrudgingly agrees. Settling into some semblance of normalcy, she meets and becomes interested in fellow student James Lansome, her resident advisor.

James helps her avoid the paparazzi, escape her security team, and experience life as a normal girl. They discuss their deepest thoughts and wishes, and Sam tells him that although she is never alone, she is often lonely. Her dream has always been to drive an old Volkswagen off to college, with no babysitters or parents.

To thank James and Mia for their tolerance of her complicated world, Sam flies them home to D.C. to attend a ball, with the dresses delivered to her personally by Vera Wang. Outside the ball, a protest causes her security team to evacuate her again, when she discovers that James is actually an agent and has been protecting her all along.

Feeling heartbroken and betrayed, Sam tries to readjust to college life, but an attempt to make James jealous only results in her drunken photo splashed across tabloid articles. She returns home to help her father on the last stretch of his campaign, while James is disciplined for failure to act in a manner becoming of an agent. Sam asks her father to make sure James's career is not ruined by their romance, to which he agrees.

The President wins re-election and dances with Sam at his inauguration ball, referencing something she told him in his speech and acknowledging she is now a grown woman and worthy of his respect. She is surprised and pleased to see that James is in attendance, having been reassigned to the presidential detail. They dance, and he gives her keys to an old Volkswagen (her dream car) and encourages her to go "break some rules".

The film ends with Sam driving off in her car, heading back to college and the narrator telling us that she will be back in the spring, and reunite with James.

== Cast ==
- Katie Holmes as Samantha MacKenzie
- Marc Blucas as James
- Amerie as Mia
- Margaret Colin as Melanie MacKenzie
- Lela Rochon as Liz Pappas (as Lela Rochon Fuqua)
- Michael Keaton as President MacKenzie
- Michael Milhoan as Agent Bock
- Dwayne Adway as Agent Dylan

In addition, making cameo appearances as themselves, are Vera Wang, Joan Rivers, Melissa Rivers and Jay Leno. Opening and closing narration is provided by the film's director, Forest Whitaker.

== Production ==
The film began development in March 1999, when actor Jerry O'Connell sold a screenplay he had written to Regency Enterprises for a six-figure sum, with O'Connell also intending to star in the film. Originally to shoot in the summer of that year, the project was pushed back to the spring of 2000 (under the direction of Brian Robbins) to allow O'Connell to film Mission to Mars, and then Rob Thomas was hired to rewrite the script; O'Connell later received a "story by" credit for the film from the Writers Guild of America. For unknown reasons, the film was not produced at that time, though the film's original producer, Mike Karz, did receive a producer credit on the final print of the film.

The filming began on June 2, 2003 on a budget of $30 million, and continued into July. The film was shot on location in Southern California. For the opening scene, where Samantha descends a red-carpeted stairway, the lobby of the Los Angeles Theatre in Los Angeles is used, while the auditorium of the building is used for a scene where Samantha and James go to see a movie. On-campus scenes were shot at UCLA, and the Huntington Library in San Marino stood in for the exterior of the building in the first scene.

== Reception ==
=== Critical response ===
The film received generally negative reviews. On the review aggregator website Rotten Tomatoes, 8% of 86 critics' reviews are positive, with an average rating of 3.8/10. The website's consensus reads: "First Daughter is a bland and charmless fairy tale that fails to rise above the formula." Metacritic, which uses a weighted average, assigned the film a score of 31 out of 100, based on 24 critics, indicating "generally unfavorable" reviews. Audiences surveyed by CinemaScore gave the film a grade "B+" on scale of A to F.

Reviewer Mike McGranaghan pointed out that the film was very similar to that of the concurrently-made film Chasing Liberty, which coincidentally had the working title First Daughter, and which also involved a plot where the President's daughter tried to experience life away from the White House.

Manohla Dargis of The New York Times gave the film a negative review and wrote it "Plays more like a nightmare than a dream, and an exceedingly unnerving one at that. Sam isn't just a prisoner of her parents' ambitions; like nearly everyone else in this film, she's a zombie, sleepwalking through life while Rome burns." Michael O'Sullivan of The Washington Post called the film, "One hackneyed, inauthentic, predictable scene after another."

Writing for the Newhouse News Service, Stephen Whitty described the film as being "crammed full of threadbare fairy-tale imagery" and that "the plot has as much energy as the old Gephardt campaign".

=== Box office ===
The film was a box-office bomb. Given a wide release on 2,260 screens, it opened in fifth place at the box office, but fell out of the Top 10 by its third weekend; it was reduced to fewer than 200 screens by its fifth week. Overall, First Daughter grossed $9.1 million in the United States and Canada, and $1.5 million in other territories, for a worldwide total of $10.6 million, against a budget of $30 million.
