= Joseph Valachi =

American mobster (1904–1971)

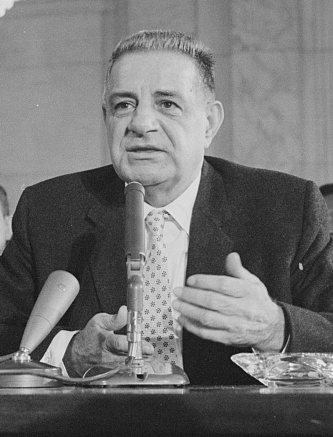
- Valachi in 1963
- Born: Joseph Michael Valachi; September 22, 1904 (Note: September 22, 1904, is a birth date most commonly used, however, September 22, 1903, is a birth date that has also been cited.); New York City, U.S.
- Died: April 3, 1971 (aged 66); Anthony, Texas, U.S.
- Resting place: Gate of Heaven Cemetery, Lewiston, New York, U.S.
- Other names: "Anthony Sorge", "Charles Charbano", "Joe Cago", "Joe Cargo"
- Occupation: Mobster
- Known for: First Italian-American Mafia member to acknowledge its existence publicly Valachi hearings
- Spouse: Carmela Reina (m. 1932)
- Relatives: Gaetano Reina (father-in-law)
- Allegiance: Genovese crime family
- Convictions: Drug trafficking (1959); Murder (1962)
- Penalty: 15 years imprisonment Life imprisonment

Joseph Michael Valachi (September 22, 1904 – April 3, 1971) was an American mobster in the Genovese crime family who was the first member of the Italian-American Mafia to acknowledge its existence publicly in 1963. He is credited with the popularization of the term Cosa Nostra.

Valachi was convicted of drug trafficking in 1959, and sentenced to 15 years' imprisonment. In 1962, while he and Genovese family boss Vito Genovese were in prison together, he murdered an inmate who he thought was a hitman sent by Genovese, and was sentenced to life imprisonment. Valachi subsequently became an informant and government witness, and the next year testified before a U.S. Senate committee in what became known as the Valachi hearings. He disclosed previously unknown information about the Italian-American Mafia, including its structure, operations, rituals, and membership. His testimony was the first major violation of omertà, the Mafia's code of silence, and the first concrete evidence that the Italian-American Mafia existed to federal authorities and the general public. Valachi died in prison on April 3, 1971.

== Early life ==
Valachi was born on September 22, 1904 in the East Harlem area of New York City, United States, to Domenico Villacci and Maria Michela Casale. His parents were impoverished Italian immigrants from Cervinara, in the region of Campania. His father was a violent alcoholic, and Valachi later blamed his background for turning to organized crime.

== Career ==
=== Minutemen ===
Valachi's criminal career began with a small gang, known as the Minutemen, which was so called for carrying out smash-and-grab burglaries and escaping within a minute. Valachi was the driver for the gang, and his ability to make a quick getaway earned him a reputation as a rising star in the New York City criminal underworld. In 1921, Valachi was arrested on grand larceny charges, and in 1923, he was arrested in the aftermath of a botched robbery. He pleaded guilty to attempted burglary and was sentenced to 18 months imprisonment at Sing Sing but was released after he had served only nine months. Valachi returned to discover he had been replaced with a new driver by the Minutemen and so he formed a new burglary gang.

=== Italian-American Mafia ===
In 1930, Valachi was inducted as a made man into the American Mafia. He soon became a soldato (soldier) in the Reina family, now known as the Lucchese family, led by Gaetano Reina. Valachi joined during the height of the Castellammarese War, a violent power struggle within Italian organized crime between the factions of Joe Masseria and Salvatore Maranzano over control of operations in the United States. Reina was assassinated after he had switched allegiances from Masseria to Maranzano. Valachi fought as part of the Reina family on the side of Maranzano, which eventually emerged victorious after Masseria's assassination on April 15, 1931. Maranzano proclaimed himself capo di tutti i capi ("boss of all bosses") in the Italian-American Mafia, and Valachi became one of his bodyguards. That position was short-lived, as Maranzano himself was assassinated five months after the end of the Castellammarese War by a coalition of his subordinates, led by Charles "Lucky" Luciano. Valachi then became a soldier in the family headed by Luciano, eventually known as the Genovese family, in the crew headed by Anthony "Tony Bender" Strollo. In July 1932, Valachi married Carmela Reina, the eldest daughter of Gaetano Reina.

In 1953, boss Vito Genovese allegedly ordered the murder of mobster Steven Franse. Genovese had given Franse the task of supervising his wife Anna while he hid in Italy. Outraged over Anna's potential love affairs and her lawsuit against him, Genovese ordered Valachi to set up Franse's murder. On June 18, 1953, Valachi lured Franse to his restaurant in the Bronx, where Franse was strangled to death by Pasquale Pagano and Fiore Siano (Valachi's nephew).

== Federal testimony ==
Valachi was convicted of narcotics violations in 1959 and sentenced to 15 years in prison. Valachi's motivations for becoming an informer had been the subject of some debate: Valachi claimed to be testifying as a public service and to expose a powerful criminal organization that he had blamed for ruining his life. However, it is also possible he was hoping for government protection as part of a plea bargain in which he was sentenced to life imprisonment instead of death for a murder, which he had committed in 1962 while in prison for his narcotics violation.

Valachi and Genovese were both serving sentences for heroin trafficking. On June 22, 1962, using a pipe left near some construction work, Valachi bludgeoned an inmate to death whom he had mistaken for Joseph DiPalermo, a Mafia member whom he believed Genovese had contracted to kill him. After time with FBI handlers, Valachi came forward with a story of Genovese giving him a kiss on the cheek, which he took as a "kiss of death." Valachi claimed a $100,000 bounty had been placed for his death by Genovese.

When Valachi decided to co-operate with the U.S. Justice Department, Attorney William G. Hundley became his protector and later stated, "We'd put dark glasses and wigs on him and take him to the Roma restaurant. He was a hell of a guy.... My days with Valachi convinced me that the Cosa Nostra was the most overrated thing since the Communist Party."

In October 1963, Valachi testified before Arkansas Senator John L. McClellan's Permanent Subcommittee on Investigations of the U.S. Senate Committee on Government Operations, known as the Valachi hearings, stating that the Italian-American Mafia actually existed, the first time a member had acknowledged its existence in public. Valachi's testimony was the first major violation of omertà, breaking his blood oath. He was the first member of the Italian-American Mafia to acknowledge its existence publicly, and is credited with the popularization of the term cosa nostra.

Although Valachi's disclosures never led directly to the prosecution of any Mafia leaders, he provided many details of history of the Mafia, operations and rituals; aided in the solution of several unsolved murders; and named many members and the major crime families. The trial exposed American organized crime to the world through Valachi's televised testimony.

After the Justice Department first encouraged and then blocked publication of Valachi's memoirs, a biography, heavily influenced by the memoirs as well as interviews with Valachi, was written by journalist Peter Maas and published in 1968 as The Valachi Papers, forming the basis for a later film of the same title, starring Charles Bronson in the titular role.

== Death ==
On April 3, 1971, Valachi died of a heart attack while he was serving his sentence at the Federal Correctional Institution, La Tuna, in Anthony, Texas. Marie K. Jackson of Niagara Falls, New York, claimed Valachi’s body and he was buried four days later at the Gate of Heaven Cemetery in Lewiston, New York. Valachi was introduced to Jackson by a mutual friend, and it is rumored that she was his mistress. It was later learned that Valachi had listed her as his executor and beneficiary. Valachi and Jackson are buried alongside each other.

== In popular culture ==
- The Valachi Papers, 1968 book by Peter Maas.
- The Valachi Papers, 1972 film based on the book; Valachi is portrayed by Charles Bronson.
- Francis Ford Coppola, in his director's commentary on The Godfather Part II (1974), mentioned that the scenes depicting the Senate committee interrogation of Michael Corleone and Frank Pentangeli are based on Valachi's federal hearings and that Pentangeli is like a Valachi figure.
- Valachi is portrayed by Joe Viterelli in the 1992 film Ruby, and by Manuel Tadros in the 2008 Canadian French film The American Trap.
- Valachi is portrayed by Richard Petrocelli in the television series Godfather of Harlem.
- In The Simpsons episode "Homie the Clown", there is a scene where Homer, having been kidnapped by the mob for resembling Krusty the Clown, attempts to explain that he's not actually Krusty with a fake name. Homer inadvertently stumbles upon Joe Valachi's name, whom the mobsters instantly recognize as "The same Joe Valachi who squealed to the Senate about organized crime."
