= William G. Hundley =

American lawyer

- Hundley (1977)
- Born: William George Hundley; August 16, 1925; Pittsburgh, Pennsylvania, USA
- Died: June 11, 2006 (aged 80); Vienna, Fairfax County; Virginia
- Education: Fordham University School of Law
- Occupation: Attorney
- Spouse: Roberta Inglis "Bobbie" Hundley (died 2005)
- Children: William Grover Hundley; Barbara H. Ruffino of Alexandria; John Hundley; Richard Hundley; Mary H. Maddox; James Hundley

William George Hundley (August 16, 1925 – June 11, 2006) was an American criminal defense attorney, who specialized in the representation of political figures accused of white-collar crimes. Earlier in the 1950s and 1960s, as a United States Department of Justice attorney, he became known for the prosecution of racketeering figures. He once encouraged narcotics dealer and loan shark Joseph Valachi to outline for public consumption the structure of the then secret Mafia or Cosa Nostra.

Hundley died at the age of eighty of liver cancer at his home in Vienna in Fairfax County, Virginia.
