= Stephen Geller =

American screenwriter and novelist (born 1940)

- Born: Stephen D. Geller; August 31, 1940 (age 86); Los Angeles, California, U.S.
- Education: Birmingham High School; Dartmouth College; Yale University
- Occupations: Screenwriter, novelist
- Website: upwriteonthedownbeat.com

Stephen D. Geller (born August 31, 1940 in Los Angeles, California) is an American screenwriter and novelist. He wrote the screenplay for the film adaptation of Kurt Vonnegut's novel Slaughterhouse-Five, and has worked in the film industry in Hollywood and Europe. Geller directed his own independent feature titled Mother's Little Helpers.

== Career ==
Geller grew up in Hollywood during the 1940s and 1950s. His father, a musician and arranger for CBS, was subpoenaed by the House Committee on Un-American Activities in the '50s, forcing the family to move to Paris, France.

Educated at Dartmouth College and Yale University, Geller moved to Rome, Italy from 1969 to 1979 to work for the Italian producer Dino De Laurentiis, where he wrote the screenplay for The Valachi Papers and other films. Rome became his home for the next 16 years. He worked in the Italian, French, British and independent film industries. He also commuted to Los Angeles and wrote for every major studio during this period. In 1986, he returned to Hollywood, working there for a time, but leaving to found screenwriting programs at Arizona State University and at Boston University.

His screenwriting credits, in addition to Slaughterhouse-Five, include Ashanti, The Valachi Papers, and Warburg: A Man of Influence, and "Mother's Little Helpers."

In 1997, Geller directed, co-wrote and acted in the play Opportunities in Zero Gravity with Kae Geller, his writing partner and wife. This two-actor, seven-character play thematically wove monologues around popular cultural mythology, capitalism, and the pursuit of the American Dream.

Aside from screenwriting, he has published 11 novels and a book on screenwriting, written several plays, and directed both theater and film. He currently teaches Shakespeare, satire, and the personal essay at Savannah College of Art and Design. His most recent novel is 'Jews in Dark Matter.' His most recent non-fiction book is 'Sabbath-on-Swathe,' an 'author-ized' autobiography.

== Personal ==
Stephen Geller's blog Upwriteonthedownbeat combines personal reflections, critiques of film, music, and art, as well as excerpts from his fiction and poetry. Stephen Geller's wife, Kae Mankovich, was an elite level ice dancer, and is a writer, educator, and performer. Their daughter, Florrie, is a professional ballet dancer. He has two other daughters from a first marriage: Hillary, who is a graphic designer; and Polly, who is a poet, jazz singer, and professor of English and languages.

in 2016, during the #OscarsSoWhite controversy of the Academy Awards, Geller wrote an open letter to Cheryl Boone Isaacs, president of the Academy of Motion Picture Arts and Sciences. The letter called the controversy a "false flag issue" and denied that older members of the Academy were responsible for it.

== Works ==
=== Screenplays ===
- The Valachi Papers (co-writer) (1972)
- Slaughterhouse-Five (1972)
- Ashanti (1979)
- Warburg: A Man of Influence (co-writer) (1992)
- Mother's Little Helpers (also directed) (2005)

=== Novels ===
- She Let Him Continue (1966), made into the film Pretty Poison (1968)
- Pit Bull (1967)
- Joop's Dance (1969)
- Gad (1979)
- Feist (2012)
- Jews on the Moon (2013)
- Jews Beyond Jupiter (2013)
- Jews in Black Holes (2013)
- Jews and the Theories of String (2013)
- Jews at the Table, Volumes 1 & 2 (the previous four novels, set in two editions) (2013)
- A Warning of Golems (2013)
- Martinis at Dawn (2014)
- Jews in the Bosom of the Big Bang (2014)
- Jews in dark matter: with Jesus, the Christ, and Other Big Surprises (2017)

=== Nonfiction ===
- Screenwriting: A Method (1985)
- Two Excerpts from a Novel-in-Progress (2015)
- Sabbath-on-Swathe: an authorized autobiography (2018)

== Awards ==
- Special Jury Prize, Cannes Film Festival, Slaughterhouse-Five;
- First Hugo Science-Fiction Film Award, Slaughterhouse-Five.
- European Silver Award for best miniseries, Warburg: A Man of Influence
- Zoetrope International Internet Film Festival, Cuppa Cabby, Piece O' Pie
- Connecticut Governor General's Award, "Water Water Everywhere"
