= Audrey Maas =

American television writer and producer (1934–1975)

- Born: Audrey Gellen; December 7, 1934; New York City, U.S.
- Died: July 2, 1975 (aged 40); New York City, U.S.
- Education: Barnard College
- Occupations: Television writer; television and film producer; novelist
- Spouses: David Padwa (m. 1955, divorced) Peter Maas (m. 1962)
- Children: 1
- Writing career
- Years active: 1954–1975
- Notable works: Wait Till the Sun Shines, Nellie; Alice Doesn't Live Here Anymore; Eleanor and Franklin

Audrey Maas (née Gellen; December 7, 1934 – July 2, 1975) was an American television writer and producer for David Susskind's production company Talent Associates. She left Talent Associates in 1966 to focus on her only novel, Wait Till the Sun Shines, Nellie. Gellen Maas later returned to Talent Associates and co-produced Alice Doesn't Live Here Anymore (1974) alongside Susskind. On July 2, 1975, she died from a cerebral hemorrhage, at the age of 40.

== Early years and education ==
Audrey Gellen was born on December 7, 1934 to Michael and Edith Gellen, in New York City. She later grew up in Nyack, New York. She studied playwrighting at Harvard University and attended Cornell University, where Vladimir Nabokov was one of her professors. In 1954, Gellen graduated from Barnard College, where she also won the Emily James Putnam Award for creative writing.

== Career ==
=== 1954–1966: Talent Associates ===
By 1954, Gellen became an avid viewer of television series produced by David Susskind's production company Talent Associates. She learned about Susskind from the writers and directors she had met with during weekends at Fire Island. Intense with a desire to work for Susskind, Gellen applied as a secretary for Talent Associates. Lucy Jarvis, then a Talent Associates employee, remembered the day Gellen inquired about the position. She noted that Gellen's white blouse was dirty, there were runs in her stockings, and her hair was frizzled and unkempt. Although Gellen was not presentable for the position, Jarvis nevertheless had her take a typing test. After more than an hour had passed, Jarvis found Gellen's writing sample to be error-filled and with erasure marks.

Impressed with Gellen's passion, Jarvis took Gellen's writing sample directly to Susskind's office. She recalled, "I told him the wrong thing. I said, 'David, I think you have a winner here.'" Inside Susskind's office, Gellen was asked a series of challenging questions a television producer would face. Jarvis stated, "And she [Gellen] was brilliant. He said, 'Okay, I'll give you a chance.' It took some doing to clean her up."

That same year, Gellen was placed under Jacqueline Babbin, a script editor, as a stenographer. Babbin told TV Guide magazine in 1959: "And as a stenographer, Audrey operated several formidable handicaps. She couldn't type or take shorthand and she didn't like to be dictated to. Worst stenographer I ever saw." However, Babbin recognized Gellen's potential, in which she next assigned Gellen to read scripts for The Kaiser Aluminum Hour and Armstrong Circle Theatre.

Within a few years, Gellen teamed with Babbin on adapting A Tale of Two Cities, Ethan Frome, and Billy Budd into 90-minute teleplays for the DuPont Show of the Month. Susskind had felt producing shows based on classic literature would be favorable towards sponsors, respectable enough for television critics to praise, and cheap to shoot. Also, the properties selected for each episode were in the public domain and did not require licensing rights. The essential cost was hiring a television writer to adapt the work, which Gellen and Babbin both did as staff writers.

A TV Guide magazine profile wrote their collaboration began with both women having read the story independently, and then discuss it, conduct research and start writing the adaptation. For the "Billy Budd" episode, they read Herman Melville's novel several times. Next, they read the Broadway play adaptation staged in 1951. Next, they researched the specific nautical terminology, in which Gellen explained to the magazine: "We had to find out the difference between a yardarm and a lanyard before we could begin writing the script."

Their scripts were well received by Terence Rattigan and Carson McCullers. After Rattigan had watched their adaptation of The Browning Version, he turned to Gellen and simply said: "Smashing." McCullers read their TV script for The Member of the Wedding and liked it well enough that when British producers wanted to purchase the TV rights to the original Broadway play, she insisted they instead use the script written by Babbin and Gellen.

By 1959, Babbin, Gellen, Rose Tobias, and Renée Valente were instrumental for Susskind's Talent Associates. They posed for a double-page spread in a TV Guide magazine story titled "Where Women Are Welcome." By this same time, Gellen was made an associate producer for the DuPont Show of the Month, as well as TV film adaptations of The Moon and Sixpence (1959) and The Power and the Glory (1960), which both starred Laurence Olivier.

On May 9, 1961, Federal Communications Commission (FCC) chairman Newton N. Minow delivered a speech titled "Television and the Public Interest", in which he referred to American commercial television programming as a "vast wasteland". An inquiry into the American television industry was held, where James D. Cunningham, the commission's chief hearing examiner, presided. The next month, in June, Gellen testified before the FCC, in which she alleged the Batten, Barton, Durstine and Osborn (BBDO) advertising agency had interfered with the programming for the DuPont Show of the Month, the most recent example was a telecast of Horton Foote's The Night of the Storm. She told the committee: "Getting it on was half the trouble. Then came the long letters: Couldn't you put some jokes in it? Couldn't you brighten it up? There was the watchdog attitude. They came to rehearsals. They said, 'We're going to depress people with this.'"

In 1962, Gellen married Peter Maas, then a journalist for Look magazine. Her father-in-law Carl Maas was the chief art director for Standard Oil of New Jersey (later incorporated as ExxonMobil), who oversaw international cultural affairs. Gellen approached her father-in-law about sponsoring a program series titled Festival of Performing Arts, in which musicians and actors would perform one full hour of their chosen material. At the time, Standard Oil sponsored The Play of the Week and BBC's An Age of Kings.

The first episode premiered on May 8, 1962 and starred Margaret Leighton and Patrick O'Neal performing the prose and poetry of Dorothy Parker. Jack Gould, television critic for The New York Times, praised both actors, writing "the duel of wits and intuition was exceptionally well realized and the love scenes were beautifully done." The series ran for ten episodes and was broadcast in ten television markets (including WNEW-TV). It won three New York Emmy Awards.

=== 1966: Wait Till the Sun Shines, Nellie ===
According to biographer Stephen Battaglio, those who had known Gellen Maas described her as a "brainier version" of Holly Golightly from Truman Capote's 1958 novella Breakfast at Tiffany's. This inspired her to write her own roman à clef. Her second husband Peter Maas encouraged her to leave Talent Associates so she can concentrate on her personal writing.

In 1966, Gellen Maas wrote her first novel Wait Till the Sun Shines, Nellie, published by the New American Library. The novel centered on Nellie—an attractive, alcoholic young woman who wishes to sing like Helen Morgan or Ruth Etting—who kills herself at the age of 22. The novel then reminisces about her from the perspective of five men in her life—a teacher, a painter, an author, an actor, and a talent agent who had represented Nellie.

In a 1967 review, The New Yorker wrote Gellen Maas has "pieced together the saga of Nellie's ruin with such pace and conviction that her penchant for 'smart' dialogue—echoing the more sophisticated television comedies—never quite collapses into bathos." An unproduced film adaptation was announced in 1969 with Ray Stark and Irving Pincus slated to produce and a script to be adapted by Gavin Lambert and Sally Ordway.

=== 1967–1975: Return to Talent Associates ===
By the summer of 1973, Gellen Maas returned to Talent Associates. Larry Cohen had read Robert Getchell's spec script for Alice Doesn't Live Here Anymore (1974) and was sold, having read five pages of the script. Cohen presented the script to David Susskind, who was ambivalent at first. However, Gellen Maas was enthusiastic and among several women at Talent Associates who pushed Susskind to buy the script. Convinced, Susskind optioned the script for $2,000.

Alice was discussed as a feature film or TV film with several actresses considered. Cohen and Getchell then considered Ellen Burstyn, who had appeared in The Last Picture Show (1971). At the time, Burstyn was filming The Exorcist (1973) and executives at Warner Bros. were impressed with the dailies. Warner Bros. president John Calley handed Burstyn the script, who not only agreed to do it but demanded she choose the director and have script approval. Burstyn selected Martin Scorsese to direct and asked that qualified women be hired for prominent production crew positions. Among the women hired for key positions were Gellen Maas as co-producer.

Back at Talent Associates, Gellen Maas produced the 1976 miniseries Eleanor and Franklin. She was posthumously awarded the 1977 Primetime Emmy Award for Outstanding Special – Drama or Comedy, alongside Susskind and Harry R. Sherman. She was also posthumously credited as a writer for the 1976 teleplay of George Bernard Shaw's Caesar and Cleopatra, which starred Sir Alec Guinness and Genevieve Bujold for the Hallmark Hall of Fame anthology series.

== Personal life and death ==
Gellen met her first husband David Padwa while he studied at Columbia University and she studied at Barnard. They had known each other for ten days prior to their marriage. On July 31, 1955, their marriage was presided by Rabbi William Berkowitz at the B'nai Jeshurun in White Plains, New York. Padwa later graduated from Columbia Law School and began a career in international law. Both he and Gellen moved into an apartment in Greenwich Village. Their marriage ended in divorce. On April 4, 1962, Gellen married Peter Maas, which was officiated by Arthur G. Klein. They had one son, John-Michael.

On July 2, 1975, Gellen Maas died from a cerebral hemorrhage at the New York Hospital, having been hospitalized for a blood disease since the prior week. Her memorial service was held at the Ashawagh Hall in East Hampton, New York.
