= Stuppagghiari =

Historical criminal group

The Stuppagghiari was an early predecessor of the Sicilian Mafia. A 19th-century organized-crime group based in Monreale, near Palermo in Sicily, its initiation rite was one of the first such rites described to an outside audience.
