= Anna Genovese =

Italian-American businesswoman in the Italian mob

Anna Genovese (formerly Vernotico, née Giovaninna Petillo; 28 October 1905 – January 1982) was an Italian-American businesswoman and the second wife of mobster Vito Genovese of the Genovese crime family and the Costello crime syndicate. She played a key role in Manhattan's drag bar scene in the middle of the 20th century.

== Early life ==
Genovese was born Giovaninna "Anna" Petillo, the eldest child of Italian-Catholic immigrants, Aniello Vincenzo Petillo from Risigliano, Naples, and Concetta Cassini Genovese, a cousin of Vito's. His brother Carmine lived with the Petillos after immigrating in 1910. Her siblings were Nicolas, Pietra, Ferdinand, and Mario Petillo. She has been erroneously listed as a sibling to mobster David Petillo; they were cousins. In the spring of 1924, at age 19, Genovese married her first husband, Gerard "Gerry" Vernotico. According to Kate Harmon, Genovese's great niece, to whom researchers from the Mob Queens spoke, Anna's marriage "was not looked upon kindly" by her family, as Vernotico was considered a man of little means. In 1927, Genovese and Vernotico had a daughter, Marie, and moved a few blocks north of Anna's West Houston Street home to a tenement apartment next to an elevated train on Sixth Avenue in Greenwich Village. In a 1930 census, she is listed as a housewife and Gerard as a carpenter, though grand-niece Harmon states that Gerard was in fact a baker at a bakery in Little Italy and "had nothing." Court records show that at the same time, Anna had been working evenings in one of the clubs in the Washington Square Park neighborhood, near or in Greenwich Village.

== Marriage to Vito Genovese ==
It is thought that Vito Genovese, a fourth cousin of Anna's, was responsible for or involved with the murder of Gerard Vernotico in March 1932. Two weeks later, Anna and Vito, whose first wife had also just died, were married. Anna was six months pregnant. The couple's first luxury apartment was located at 43 Fifth Avenue, a decadent Beaux Arts building, completed in 1905, with limestone pillars, a marble lobby, and wrought-iron balconies.

Two years into their marriage, Vito killed gangster Ferdinand "The Shadow" Boccia. A year later, in 1935, Vito bought Deep Cut, a 1928 mansion on a 40-acre (16 ha) property in Middletown Township, New Jersey. Around the same time, New York Special Prosecutor Thomas E. Dewey started cracking down on organized crime, which boded poorly for Vito once Boccia's body was pulled from the Hudson River in 1937, as one of the hit men he hired for the job admitted to police that the commission had come from Vito.

Standing accused of the Boccia murder and other crimes, such as racketeering, Vito decided to flee the U.S., leaving the bulk of his business up to Anna. She was left to help formulate a source of revenue for the crime family at a time when most in the nation were struggling severely, as it was mid-Great Depression.

== Business ventures ==
While raising three children (her biological daughter with Gerard, Marie; Nancy, Vito's daughter with the late Donata Ragone; and Phillip, her son with Vito), Anna also ran nightclubs, gay bars, and drag bars in Lower Manhattan, whose profits she siphoned to the crime syndicate and Vito, exiled in Italy, who donated to Benito Mussolini's fascist party and supplied cocaine for Mussolini's son.

=== Club Caravan ===
Anna's first club, Club Caravan, opened in 1939 at 578 West Broadway. Singers and other kinds of performers provided the entertainment, individuals like drag king Malvina Schwartz, also known as Buddy "Bubbles" Kent, whose 1983 Lesbian Herstory Archives oral history chronicles her time spent there.

Anna later testified against her own club when she appeared in Freehold, New Jersey's Superior Court in 1953. She also named Club Savannah and Moroccan Village, run by other mobsters, but the latter was one of her husband's hang-outs.

=== Club 82 ===
While Vito was in hiding abroad, Anna became hostess of Club 82, a gay bar located at 82 E. 4th St., between Second Avenue and the Bowery in Manhattan, which started in October 1950. There, Anna cultivated a vibrant gay scene. The club's tagline was "Who's No Lady," and its drag revues featured both male and female impersonators. Kitt Russell, dubbed "America's top femme mimic" by Walter Winchell, hosted many of the shows, and countless acts performed in them, such as female impersonators Sonne Teal, Kim Christy, and Mel Michaels. Revues were long and elaborate, replete with sets and costumes, and with titles like Sincapades of 1954, A Vacation in Color, Fun-Fair for '57, and Time Out for Fun. According to Anna's eldest grandson, Frank, at 4:38 in Chapter 12 of Mob Queens, Anna supported show biz acts in their nascency, such as Barbra Streisand.

The venue would later come under investigation with a potential loss of its liquor license, allegedly orchestrated by vindictive Vito to spite Anna. In testifying against her own clubs, Anna stated that Club 82 was gang-owned. Her testimony ostensibly served to shift the blame from solely herself to her husband Vito's associates who had presided over and allegedly monitored her activities running the club while Vito was in exile in Italy.

The State Liquor Authority had previously revoked Club 82's liquor license on account of "disorderly conduct," which was code at the time for infractions involving things like serving alcohol to gay people, or people suspected of being gay.

Anna left the club in the late 1960s in order to focus more on her family, but the venue lasted into the 1970s.

=== The 181 Club ===
Anna was a co-owner and proprietor, with gangster Steven Franse, of the 181 Club, known as "The East Side's Gayest Spot" and "the homosexual Copacabana". According to Franse's Supreme Court appellate testimony, his niece, Emily, was a part-time bookkeeper there. It was a gay cabaret venue and drag queens such as Buddy "Bubbles" Kent, who had worked at Anna's Caravan Club, also worked at the 181. It would eventually lose its liquor license and be labeled "a hangout for perverts of both sexes" in reference to its gay performers and clientele.

== Separation from Vito Genovese ==
By 1940, Vito had been in exile from the United States for seven years. Finally, he was extradited back to the States and was placed in custody, standing accused of the 1934 murder of Ferdinand "The Shadow" Boccia. However, after two key witnesses were found dead, the authorities had no choice but to free Vito, under which circumstances he was reunited with Anna. He then instigated a move from Manhattan to Atlantic Highlands, New Jersey, where they lived luxuriously but summarily ended Anna's club career.

Anna had walked out on Vito in 1950. She then asked, in court, for $200 per week in maintenance, which meant alimony without the divorce. However, she dropped the divorce suit in 1951.

== Testimony in open court ==
In order to escape the domestic violence she said she was experiencing at the hands of Vito, Anna resumed her efforts to rid herself of him. On March 2, 1953, at the Freehold County Courthouse, Anna testified against Vito in court—open court, an unheard-of move for any mob wife. She asked the judge for $350/week (approximately $160,000 per year, adjusted for inflation in 2019's money). Vito filed a countersuit for divorce on the grounds of desertion. Both claims were ultimately dismissed in the New Jersey Superior Court appellate division.

Anna had testified that the family had been involved in narcotics trafficking, casinos, labor rackets, dog and horse racing, and other criminal activities. She claimed that she managed gambling ventures that generated an income of $30,000 per week. She also stated that she was the only one with the combination to the family safe in New Jersey. She described her many trips to Italy, delivering large sums of money to Vito while he remained in exile. Additionally, Anna implicated other major mob figures like Frank Costello and Albert Anastasia; as Anna's life would have been endangered due to her betrayal of so many dangerous people (she stated in her testimony that she had "been afraid to tell about Genovese's crime career in the past because he threatened her with death"), it is surmised that she might have been promised law enforcement protections in exchange for her testimony. If Vito were aware of her predicament, he would have possibly, ironically, forgiven her. According to Anna Genovese, Vito Genovese ruled the Italian lottery in New York and New Jersey, bringing in over $1 million per year; owned four Greenwich Village night clubs; a dog track in Virginia; and other legitimate businesses.

Amidst the revelations, it is believed that Anna also had the intention of publicly shaming Vito by insinuating that Frank Costello, his rival, had more power than he did, part of the proof being that she had faith Costello's branch would offer her protection once she left Vito. It is again surmised that Anna had immunity in testifying, as law enforcement and the courts would not have allowed her to walk free after admitting her role in the copious crimes committed.

In counter-testimony, Vito's witnesses attempted to discredit Anna's character. She was characterized as an "untrustworthy, hot-tempered" woman who slept with other women. As it was the height of the Red Scare and Lavender Scare in the United States, the characterization of Anna's behavior would serve to undermine her claims.

== Dorothy Kilgallen reportage ==
Dorothy Kilgallen, the most syndicated newspaper columnist at the time of the trial, began reporting on the case, recording live with "If I were Mrs. Vito Genovese, I'd be awful careful crossing streets." It turned out that Kilgallen was close with gangster Frank Costello, a rival of Vito Genovese. According to Kilgallen's biographer, Mark Shaw, the friendship was marked by Costello gifting Kilgallen with a diamond cross, which Kilgallen's hairdresser corroborated. It is speculated that Costello gifted Kilgallen so she would, as a favor to him, "warn" Anna—through her newspaper column and other outlets she presided over—that she needed to stop spilling mob business publicly—whether in court or otherwise—or face consequences. That, or switch allegiances from the Genovese crime family to the Costello syndicate.

== Sexuality ==
According to drag king Malvina Schwartz's Lesbian Herstory Archives interview, Anna was "definitely into the girls." Additional insight had been given by Henry "Adrian" Oranco, a drag queen who worked under Anna's supervision at Club 82. He has stated that Anna was romantically involved with a drag king named Duke, whose given name was Jackie. As a token of love, Jackie, Anna's "girlfriend," as Oranco calls her in Chapter 9 of Mob Queens, received a Cadillac. In Chapter 6 of the Mob Queens podcast, Anna's granddaughter, Mia, confirms that the two were romantically involved, Mia having met Jackie the day that Anna died. Also confirmed by Mia was Anna's romantic involvement with a woman named Gwen Saunders, a cashier at one of Anna's clubs.

== Death ==
At the end of her life, Anna worked at the upper-crust Warwick Hotel in guest relations. According to Anna's granddaughter, Mia, Cary Grant was living at the hotel at the time, and he and Anna became good friends. Mia speaks to this point at 5:23 in Chapter 12 of Mob Queens.

Thirteen years later, in January 1982, Anna had, in the words of Mia in Mob Queens Chapter 12, "a very significant stroke." She was hospitalized at St. Vincent's, where she died surrounded by her lover, Jackie, daughter Marie, and granddaughter, Mia.

Anna was buried next to her ex-husband, Vito, in the Genovese Family vault in St. John Cemetery, Queens, New York.

== Cultural references ==
Genovese is the subject of the 12-episode podcast Mob Queens (2019), hosted by writers Jessica Bendinger and Michael Seligman, who had researched her life from 2014 to 2018 after discovering a stash of old letters in 2014.

In 2024, it was announced that HBO would create a limited series based on Anna's life and the Mob Queens podcast that chronicles it. Lena Dunham, Ruth Wilson, and Dennis Lehane will be involved in the project.

She is portrayed by Kathrine Narducci in the film The Alto Knights.
