= Anthony Strollo =

American mobster (born 1899, disappeared 1962)

- Born: Anthony C. Strollo; June 18, 1899; New York City, U.S.
- Disappeared: April 8, 1962 (aged 62); Fort Lee, New Jersey, U.S.
- Status: Missing for 64 years, 7 months and 8 days
- Other name: Tony Bender
- Occupation: Mobster
- Allegiance: Genovese crime family

Anthony C. Strollo (born Antonio Strollo, Italian: [anˈtɔːnjo ˈstrol.lo]; June 18, 1899 – disappeared April 8, 1962), also known as "Tony Bender", was a New York mobster who served as a high-ranking capo and underboss of the Genovese crime family for several decades.

== Biography ==
=== Early years ===
Anthony Strollo was born in New York City, the son of Neapolitan immigrants Leone and Giovannina Nigro. Strollo grew up in Manhattan near the Manhattan Bridge.

Strollo had two brothers, Emilio and Dominick. He married a woman named Edna Goldenberg, who bore him several children. Strollo was a cousin of Pittsburgh, Pennsylvania mobster Lenny Strollo and Dante Strollo, a member of the Youngstown, Ohio, Cosa Nostra family.

Strollo was of medium height and weight, with sandy brown hair. Associates described him as usually having a doleful look. Strollo's legitimate job was that of a real estate salesman.

During Prohibition, Strollo gained a formidable reputation as a bootlegger and hitman. In the early to mid-1920s, Strollo worked for gang boss Giuseppe "Joe the Boss" Masseria. After the Castellammarese War began in 1931, Strollo defected to Masseria's rival, Salvatore Maranzano, and became a trusted lieutenant and gunman.

=== Luciano regime ===
Following the death of Maranzano, Strollo joined the Luciano crime family, headed by boss Charles "Lucky" Luciano. Strollo became a capo for Luciano and underboss Vito Genovese. Strollo assumed control of the Greenwich Village Crew, operating illegal gambling in New York's Greenwich Village and Lower Manhattan districts.

On June 18, 1936, boss Luciano was sentenced to 30 to 50 years in prison on a pandering charge, making underboss Vito Genovese the acting boss. Genovese designated Strollo as his underboss.

=== Costello regime ===
In 1937, facing a probable murder indictment, Genovese fled to Italy. Genovese wanted Strollo to keep control of the family for him, but Genovese's rival, Frank Costello, took over as acting boss and designated Willie Moretti as underboss.

In 1946, after being extradited from Italy to the United States and escaping indictment, Genovese returned to the family as a capo with Strollo as his assistant. Strollo supervised Genovese's rackets in Greenwich Village and the New Jersey waterfront for the next ten years. Strollo successfully operated a string of Greenwich Village nightclubs, including the popular Black Cat, the Hollywood, the 19th Hole (some say Christopher "Christy Tick" Furnari of the Lucchese crime family ran the 19th Hole), and the Village Inn.

On December 17, 1952, Strollo was summoned to testify at the New York State Crime Commission hearings. He was an uncooperative witness, claiming either a bad memory, or refusing to testify based on his Fifth Amendment right under the U.S. Constitution against self-incrimination.

=== Genovese regime ===
In 1957, Strollo assisted Genovese in planning an assassination attempt on Frank Costello. On the day of the murder attempt, Strollo met with Costello in the late afternoon and learned his itinerary for the evening. Strollo then passed that information on to Vincent Gigante, who was to be the shooter. Although Costello was only slightly wounded in the attack, he immediately retired from the family and passed the leadership to Genovese. Genovese now ran what is today known as the Genovese crime family.

In 1959, Strollo changed loyalties again and joined in a conspiracy against Genovese. After a secret meeting with Gambino crime family boss Carlo Gambino, Strollo allegedly participated in a plot to set up Genovese on a drug trafficking conviction. In 1959, Genovese was sent to prison for 15 years on narcotics trafficking charges.

The imprisoned Genovese now allegedly decided to kill Strollo. One theory is that Genovese learned that Strollo had betrayed him. However, a second theory states that Strollo had cheated Genovese of tribute from a drug operation.

=== Disappearance ===
On the morning of April 8, 1962, Strollo disappeared after leaving his residence in Fort Lee, New Jersey. His remains were never recovered, and no one was charged in his disappearance. When government witness Joseph Valachi later visited Genovese in prison, Genovese allegedly hinted at responsibility for Strollo's murder.

== See also ==
- List of people who disappeared

== Notes ==
- Fox, Stephen. Blood and Power: Organized Crime in Twentieth-Century America. New York: William Morrow and Company, 1989. ISBN 0-688-04350-X
- Kelly, Robert J. Encyclopedia of Organized Crime in the United States. Westport, Connecticut: Greenwood Press, 2000. ISBN 0-313-30653-2
- Sifakis, Carl. The Encyclopedia of American Crime. New York: Facts on File Inc., 2001. ISBN 0-8160-4040-0
- Mafia: The Government's Secret File on Organized Crime
