= The Valachi Papers (book) =

1968 biography by Peter Maas

- Paperback edition
- Author: Peter Maas
- Language: English
- Genre: Crime, Biography
- Publisher: G. P. Putnam's Sons
- Publication date: 1968
- Publication place: United States
- Media type: Print
- Pages: 285 pp (Hardback ed)
- ISBN: 978-0399108327

The Valachi Papers is a 1968 biography written by Peter Maas, telling the story of former mafia member Joe Valachi, a low-ranking member of the New York–based Genovese crime family, who was the first ever government witness coming from the American Mafia itself. His account of his criminal past revealed many previously unknown details of the Mafia. The book was made into a film in 1972, also called The Valachi Papers, starring Charles Bronson as Valachi.

== Overview ==
In October 1963, Valachi testified before Senator John L. McClellan's congressional committee on organized crime, the Permanent Subcommittee on Investigations of the U.S. Senate Committee on Government Operations. In the so-called Valachi hearings he gave the American public a firsthand account of Mafia activities in the United States.

In 1964, the US Department of Justice urged Valachi to write down his personal history of his underworld career. Although Valachi was only expected to fill in the gaps in his formal questioning, the resulting account of his thirty-year criminal career was a rambling 1,180-page manuscript titled The Real Thing.

Attorney General Nicholas Katzenbach authorized the public release of Valachi's manuscript. He hoped that publication of Valachi's story would aid law enforcement and possibly encourage other criminal informers to step forward. Author Peter Maas, who broke Valachi's story in The Saturday Evening Post, was assigned the job of editing the manuscript and permitted to interview Valachi in his Washington, D.C., jail cell.

The American Italian Anti-Defamation League promoted a national campaign against the book on the grounds that it would reinforce negative ethnic stereotypes. They said that if the book's publication was not stopped they would appeal directly to the White House. Katzenbach reversed his decision to publish the book after a meeting with President Lyndon B. Johnson, an action that embarrassed the Justice Department.

In May 1966, Katzenbach asked a district court to stop Maas from publishing the book—the first time that a U.S. Attorney General had ever tried to ban a book. Maas was never permitted to publish his edited version of Valachi's original manuscript, The Real Thing, but he was allowed to publish a third-person account based on his interviews with Valachi. These formed the basis of the book The Valachi Papers, which was published in 1968 by Putnam. It was published in the UK in 1969 by MacGibbon & Kee as The Canary That Sang.

Valachi's original manuscript, The Real Thing, was first made publicly accessible at the John F. Kennedy Presidential Library in Boston in 1980. It was fully digitized and published online by Thomas Hunt, an editor, publisher, and historian of organized crime, in November 2020.
