= Peter Maas =

American journalist and author (1929–2001)

- Born: June 27, 1929; New York City, U.S.
- Died: August 23, 2001 (aged 72); New York City, U.S.
- Occupation: Journalist
- Spouses: Audrey Gellen (m. 1962; died 1975); Laura Parkins (m. 1976; sep. 1979); Suzanne Jones (m. 1986)
- Children: 2
- Writing career
- Genre: Crime
- Subject: Mafia
- Notable works: The Valachi Papers (1968), Underboss (1997), Serpico (1997 book)

Peter Maas (June 27, 1929 – August 23, 2001) was an American journalist and author. He was born in New York City and attended Duke University. Maas had Dutch and Irish ancestry.

He was the biographer of Frank Serpico, a New York City Police officer who testified against police corruption. The book was made into a movie starring Al Pacino. He is also the author of the number one New York Times bestseller, Underboss, about the life and times of Sammy "The Bull" Gravano.

His other notable bestsellers include The Valachi Papers, Manhunt, and In a Child's Name, recipient of the 1991 Edgar Award for Best Fact Crime book. The Valachi Papers, which told the story of Mafia turncoat Joseph Valachi, is widely considered to be a seminal work, as it spawned an entire genre of books written by or about former Mafiosi. In May 1966, Attorney General Nicholas Katzenbach had asked a district court to stop Maas from publishing his book on Valachi—the first time that a U.S. Attorney General had ever tried to ban a book. Maas was never permitted to publish his edition of Valachi's original memoirs, but was allowed to publish a third-person account based upon interviews he himself had conducted with Valachi. These formed the basis of the book The Valachi Papers, which was published in 1968 by Putnam.

He made a brief cameo as himself in an episode of Homicide: Life on the Street. In 1972 Maas attempted to convince retired mob boss Frank Costello to allow him to write a biography of Costello's life. They had a series of interviews before Costello finally decided to agree to the months of interviews that would be required for the book. However ten days later he died of a heart attack.

Maas died in New York City, aged 72, on August 23, 2001.

== Bibliography ==
- 1967 – The Rescuer: The Extraordinary Life of the Navy's "Swede" Momsen and His Role in an Epic Submarine Disaster. ASIN B000IDBZ58; (Note: The Terrible Hours pulls material from this book.)
- 1968 – The Valachi Papers ISBN 0399108327; filmed as The Valachi Papers
- 1973 – Serpico: The Cop Who Defied the System ISBN 0670634980; filmed as Serpico
- 1974 – King of the Gypsies ISBN 0670413178; filmed as King of the Gypsies
- 1979 – Made in America: A Novel ISBN 067044555X
- 1983 – Marie: A True Story ISBN 0671607731; filmed as Marie, winner of a Christopher Award
- 1986 – Manhunt: The Incredible Pursuit of a CIA Agent Turned Terrorist ISBN 0394552938; The story of CIA agent Edwin P. Wilson.
- 1989 – Father and Son: A Novel ISBN 0671631721
- 1990 – In a Child's Name: The Legacy of a Mother's Murder ISBN 0671694162; filmed as In a Child's Name
- 1994 – China White: A Novel ISBN 0671694170
- 1996 – Killer Spy: Inside Story of the FBI's Pursuit and Capture of Aldrich Ames, America's Deadliest Spy ISBN 0446602795
- 1997 – Underboss ISBN 0060182563
- 1999 – The Terrible Hours: The Man Behind the Greatest Submarine Rescue in History ISBN 0060194804 – The story of Charles Momsen's rescue of the USS Squalus.

== See also ==
- Charles Momsen, the subject of Maas' book The Terrible Hours: The Man Behind the Greatest Submarine Rescue in History
