= Vito Genovese =

Italian-American mobster (1897–1969)

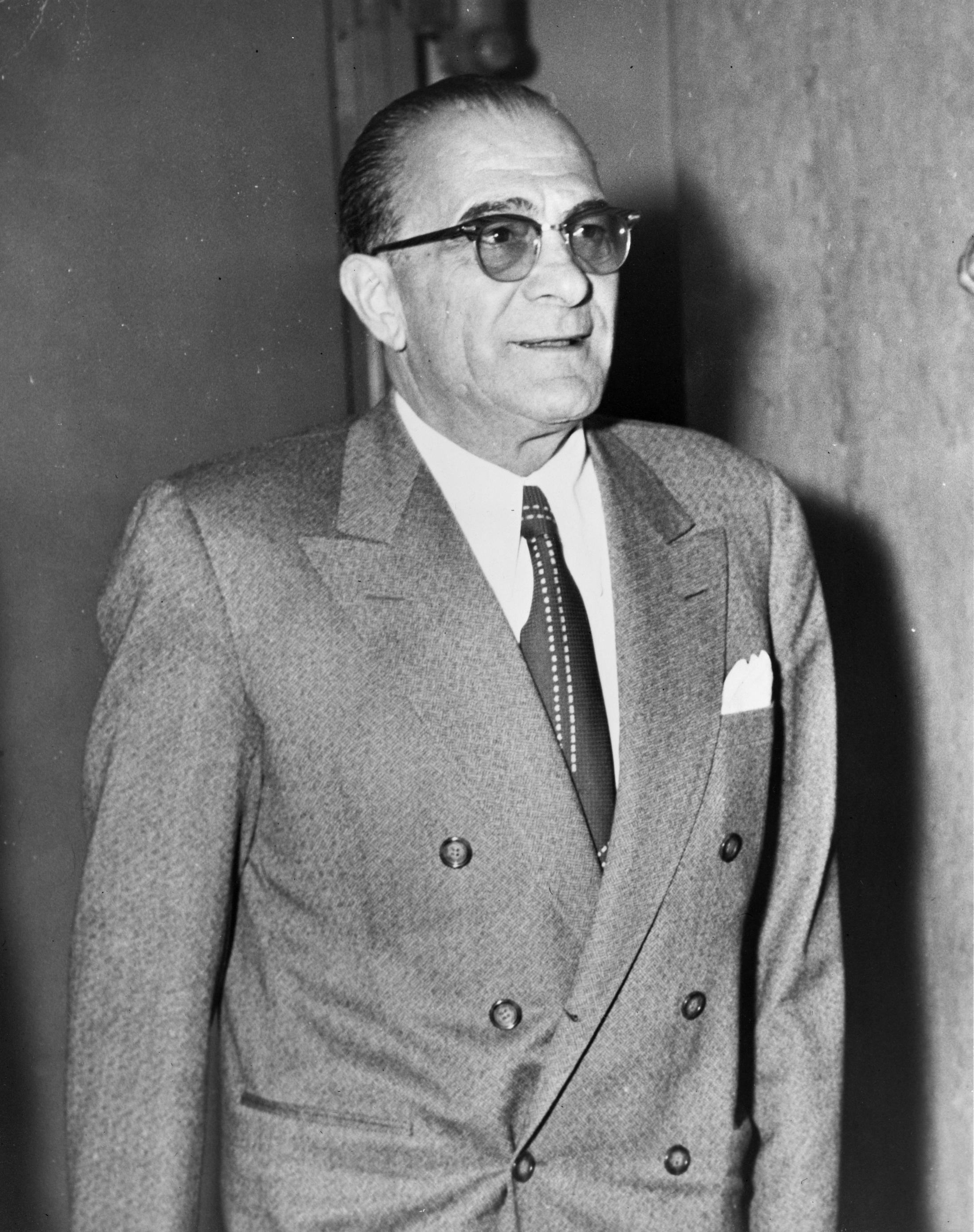
- Genovese, c. 1959
- Born: November 21, 1897; Tufino, Campania, Italy
- Died: February 14, 1969 (aged 71); Springfield, Missouri, U.S.
- Resting place: Saint John Cemetery, New York City, New York, U.S.
- Other name: "Don Vitone"
- Occupation: Crime boss
- Predecessor: Frank Costello
- Successor: Philip Lombardo
- Spouses: Donata Ragone (her death); Anna Genovese (m. 1932)
- Relatives: Michael Genovese (cousin)
- Allegiance: Genovese crime family
- Conviction: Conspiracy to violate federal narcotics laws (1959)
- Penalty: 15 years imprisonment (1959)

Vito Genovese (Italian: [ˈviːto dʒenoˈveːze, -eːse]; November 21, 1897 – February 14, 1969) was an Italian-born American mafioso and the boss of the Genovese crime family of New York City. A childhood friend and criminal associate of Lucky Luciano, Genovese took part in the Castellammarese War and helped Luciano shape the Mafia's rise as a major force in organized crime in the United States. He would later lead Luciano's crime family, which was renamed by the FBI after Genovese in 1957.

Along with Luciano, Genovese facilitated the expansion of the heroin trade to an international level. He fled to Italy in 1937, and for a brief period during World War II supported Benito Mussolini's Fascist regime for fear of being deported back to the U.S. to face murder charges. After returning to the U.S. in 1945, Genovese mentored Vincent Gigante, the future boss of the Genovese family.

In 1957, Genovese vied for the title of capo di tutti capi (boss of bosses) by ordering the murder of Albert Anastasia, boss of the modern-day Gambino crime family, and the botched hit of Frank Costello. Immediately following this, he called a Mafia summit in Apalachin, New York to consolidate his power, but the meeting was raided by police. In 1959, Genovese's reign was cut short as he was convicted on drug-related conspiracy charges and sentenced to fifteen years in prison. While he and his underling Joe Valachi were in prison together, Valachi killed an inmate he thought to be a hitman sent by Genovese. Valachi then became a government witness. Genovese died in prison on February 14, 1969.

== Early life ==
Vito Genovese was born on November 21, 1897, in Risigliano, a frazione in the comune of Tufino, in the Province of Naples, Italy. His father was Frances Felice Genovese and his mother was Nunziata Aluotto. Vito had a sister, Giovanna Jennie (m. Ricciotto Prisco), along with two brothers, Michael and Carmine, who later joined the Genovese crime family. His cousin, Michael, later became boss of the Pittsburgh crime family.

As a child in Italy, Genovese completed school only to the American equivalent of the fifth grade. In 1913, when he was aged 15, Genovese's family immigrated to the United States on board the SS Taormina and took up residence in the Little Italy neighborhood of New York City.

Until 1934, Genovese lived in New York. In 1935, looking for a country retreat for his family, he purchased a mansion in rural Middletown Township, New Jersey. The mansion's grounds were extensively landscaped into Italian gardens evoking Genovese's homeland, and included a small rock replica of Mount Vesuvius. Today, it is the site of a public botanical garden called Deep Cut Gardens. The mansion burnt down during Genovese's 1930s exile and was never rebuilt. After his return to the U.S., Genovese and his family moved to a modest house in Atlantic Highlands, New Jersey.

== Criminal career ==
Genovese started his criminal career at a young age, stealing merchandise from pushcart vendors and running errands for mobsters. He later collected money from people who played illegal lotteries. At age 19, Genovese spent a year in prison for illegal possession of a firearm. By the 1920s, he started working for Joe Masseria, the boss of a powerful Manhattan gang that would evolve into the family he would eventually lead. Lucky Luciano and his close associates started working for the gambler Arnold Rothstein, who immediately saw the potential windfall from Prohibition and educated Luciano on running bootleg alcohol as a business. Luciano, Genovese and Frank Costello started their own bootlegging operation with financing from Rothstein.

In 1930, Genovese was indicted after police found $1 million of counterfeit U.S. currency in a Brooklyn workshop. Later in 1930, he allegedly murdered Gaetano Reina, the leader of a Bronx-based gang. Reina had been allied with Masseria, but was suspected of secretly helping Masseria's rival, Brooklyn gang leader Salvatore Maranzano. On February 26, 1930, Genovese allegedly ambushed Reina as he was leaving his mistress' house in the Bronx and shot him in the back of the head with a shotgun. Masseria then took direct control of the Reina gang.

=== Castellammarese War ===
In early 1930, the Castellammarese War broke out between Masseria and Maranzano. In a secret deal with Maranzano, Luciano agreed to engineer the death of Masseria, his own boss, in return for receiving Masseria's rackets and becoming Maranzano's second-in-command. On April 15, 1931, Luciano had lured Masseria to a meeting where he was murdered at a restaurant called Nuova Villa Tammaro on Coney Island. While they played cards, Luciano allegedly excused himself to the bathroom, with the gunmen reportedly being Genovese, Albert Anastasia, Joe Adonis, and Benjamin "Bugsy" Siegel; Ciro "The Artichoke King" Terranova drove the getaway car, but legend has it that he was too shaken up to drive away and had to be shoved out of the driver's seat by Siegel. Luciano took over Masseria's family, with Genovese as his underboss.

In September 1931, Luciano and Genovese planned the murder of Salvatore Maranzano. Luciano had received word that Maranzano was planning to kill him and Genovese, and prepared a hit team to kill Maranzano first. On September 10, 1931, when Maranzano summoned Luciano, Genovese, and Frank Costello to a meeting at his office, they knew Maranzano would kill them there. Instead, Luciano sent to Maranzano's office four Jewish gangsters whose faces were unknown to Maranzano's people. They had been secured with the aid of Meyer Lansky and Siegel. Luciano subsequently created The Commission to serve as the governing body for organized crime.

In 1931, Genovese's first wife, Donata Ragone, died of tuberculosis and he quickly announced his intention to marry Anna Petillo, who was already married to Gerard Vernotico.

On March 16, 1932, Vernotico was found strangled to death on a Manhattan rooftop, and on March 28, 1932, Genovese married his widow, Anna, who was Genovese's cousin via her mother, Concetta y Cassini Genovese.

=== Boccia murder and flight to Italy ===
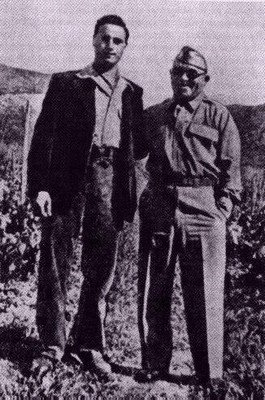
Genovese with Italian bandit Salvatore Giuliano, in 1940

In 1934, Genovese allegedly ordered the murder of mobster Ferdinand Boccia. Genovese and Boccia had conspired to cheat a wealthy gambler out of $150,000 in a high-stakes card game. After the game, Boccia demanded a share of $35,000 because he had introduced the victim to Genovese. Rather than pay Boccia anything, Genovese decided to have him murdered. On September 19, 1934, Genovese and five associates allegedly shot and killed Boccia in a coffee shop in Brooklyn.

On June 18, 1936, Luciano was sentenced to 30 to 50 years in prison as a result of his conviction on pandering. With Luciano's imprisonment, Genovese became acting boss of the Luciano crime family.

On November 25, 1936, Genovese became a naturalized United States citizen in New York City. On January 10, 1937, fearing prosecution for the Boccia murder, Genovese fled to Italy with $750,000 cash and settled in the city of Nola, near Naples. With Genovese's departure, Costello became acting boss.

After bribing some fascist party members, Genovese became a friend of Galeazzo Ciano, Benito Mussolini's son-in-law; it is believed Genovese provided Ciano with cocaine. Genovese donated nearly $4 million to Mussolini's fascist party by the end of World War II. He was also awarded the Order of Saints Maurice and Lazarus and made a commendatore, after he participated in helping create a new fascist party headquarters in Nola.

In 1943, Genovese allegedly ordered the murder of Carlo Tresca, the publisher of an anarchist newspaper in New York and an enemy of Mussolini. Genovese allegedly facilitated the murder as a favor to the Italian government. On January 11, 1943, a gunman shot and killed Tresca outside his newspaper office in Manhattan. The shooter was later alleged to be Carmine Galante, a member of the Bonanno crime family. No one was ever charged in the Tresca murder.

=== Return to New York ===
When the Allies invaded Italy in September 1943, Genovese switched sides and quickly offered his services to the U.S. Army. Former New York governor Charles Poletti, then attached to the U.S. Army, accepted a 1938 Packard Sedan as a personal gift from Genovese. Genovese was appointed to a position of interpreter/liaison officer in the U.S. Army headquarters in Naples and quickly became one of Allied Military Government for Occupied Territories' (AMGOT) most trusted employees. Poletti and the entire AMGOT department were apparently unaware of his history.

Genovese established one of the largest black market operations in southern Italy, together with the Cosa Nostra's boss Calogero Vizzini. Vizzini sent truck caravans loaded with all the basic food commodities necessary for the Italian diet rolling northward to hungry Naples, where their cargoes were distributed by Genovese's organization. All of the trucks were issued passes and export papers by the AMGOT administration in Naples and Sicily, and some corrupt American army officers even made contributions of gasoline and trucks to the operation. According to Luke Monzelli, a lieutenant in the Carabinieri assigned to follow Genovese during his time in Italy: "Truckloads of food supplies were shipped from Vizzini to Genovese — all accompanied by the proper documents which had been certified by men in authority, Mafia members in the service of Vizzini and Genovese."

In the summer of 1944 in New York, Genovese was implicated in the Boccia murder by mobster Ernest "The Hawk" Rupolo, a former Genovese associate. Facing a murder conviction, Rupolo had decided to become a government witness.

On August 27, 1944, U.S. military police arrested Genovese in Italy during an investigation into his running of a black market ring. It was revealed that Genovese had been stealing trucks, flour, and sugar from the Army. When Agent Orange C. Dickey of the Criminal Investigation Division examined Genovese's background, he discovered that Genovese was a fugitive wanted for the 1934 Boccia killing. However, there was seemingly little interest from the Army or the federal government in pursuing Genovese.

After months of frustration, Dickey was finally able to make preparations to ship Genovese back to New York to face trial, but came under increasing pressure. Genovese personally offered Dickey a $250,000 bribe to release him, then threatened Dickey when the offer was refused. Dickey was even instructed by his superiors in the military chain of command to refrain from pursuing Genovese, but refused to be dissuaded.

On June 2, 1945, after arriving in New York by ship the day before, Genovese was arraigned on murder charges for the 1934 Boccia killing. He pleaded not guilty. On June 10, 1946, another prosecution witness, Jerry Esposito, was found shot to death beside a road in Norwood, New Jersey. Earlier, another witness, Peter LaTempa, was found dead in a cell where he had been held in protective custody.

Without anyone to corroborate Rupolo's testimony, the government's case collapsed, and the charges against Genovese were dismissed on June 10, 1946. In making his decision, Judge Samuel Leibowitz commented:

I cannot speak for the jury, but I believe that if there were even a shred of corroborating evidence, you would have been condemned to the (electric) chair.

=== Pursuit of power ===
With his release from custody in 1946, Genovese was able to rejoin the Luciano family in New York; however, neither Costello nor his underboss Willie Moretti was willing to return power to him. In 1946, Lansky called a meeting of the heads of the major crime families in Havana that December. The three topics which would come under discussion were the heroin trade, Cuban gambling, and what to do about Bugsy Siegel and the floundering Flamingo Hotel project in Las Vegas. The conference took place at the Hotel Nacional de Cuba and lasted a little more than a week.

On December 20, during the conference, Luciano had a private meeting with Genovese in Luciano's hotel suite. Unlike Costello, Luciano had never trusted Genovese. In the meeting, Genovese tried to convince Luciano to become a titular boss of bosses and let Genovese run everything. Luciano calmly rejected Genovese's suggestion:

There is no Boss of Bosses. I turned it down in front of everybody. If I ever change my mind, I will take the title. But it won't be up to you. Right now you work for me and I ain't in the mood to retire. Don't you ever let me hear this again, or I'll lose my temper.

Genovese was now a capo of his former Greenwich Village Crew. However, on October 4, 1951, Moretti was assassinated by order of the Mafia Commission; the mob bosses were unhappy with his testimony during the Kefauver Hearings, and were worried, with the syphilis now affecting his brain, he might start talking to the press. Costello appointed Genovese as the new underboss.

In December 1952, Anna Genovese sued her husband for financial support, and later divorce in 1953, as well as testifying to Vito's involvement in criminal rackets, an unheard-of action by the wife of a mob figure. Two years earlier, she had moved out of the family home in New Jersey. She asked the judge for $350 per week. Vito filed a counter-suit for divorce on the grounds of desertion. According to Anna Genovese, Vito Genovese ruled the Italian lottery in New York and New Jersey, bringing in over $1 million per year, owned four Greenwich Village night clubs, a dog track in Virginia, and other legitimate businesses. Both claims were ultimately dismissed in the New Jersey Superior Court appellate division, in 1954. In 1953, Genovese allegedly ordered the murder of mobster Steven Franse. Genovese had tasked Franse with supervising Anna while he hid in Italy. Outraged over Anna's potential love affairs and her lawsuit against him, Genovese ordered Joseph Valachi to set up Franse's murder. On June 18, 1953, Valachi lured Franse to his restaurant in the Bronx, where Franse was strangled to death by Pasquale Pagano and Fiore Siano (Valachi's nephew).

During the mid-1950s, Genovese decided to move against Costello. However, Genovese needed to also remove Costello's strong ally on the Commission, Albert Anastasia, the boss of the Anastasia crime family. Genovese was soon conspiring with Carlo Gambino, Anastasia's underboss, to remove Anastasia.

In early 1957, Genovese decided the time to move on Costello had come. Genovese ordered Vincent Gigante to murder Costello, and on May 2, 1957, Gigante shot and wounded Costello outside his apartment building. Although the wound was superficial, it persuaded Costello to relinquish power to Genovese and retire. A doorman identified Gigante as the gunman, however, in 1958, Costello testified that he was unable to recognize his assailant; Gigante was acquitted on charges of attempted murder. Genovese now became boss of what is known as the Genovese crime family and promoted his longtime lieutenant, Anthony Strollo, to underboss.

In late 1957, Genovese and Gambino allegedly ordered Anastasia's murder. Genovese had heard rumors that Costello was conspiring with Anastasia to regain power. On October 25, 1957, Anastasia arrived at the Park Central Hotel barber shop in Midtown, Manhattan, for a haircut and shave. As Anastasia relaxed in the barber chair, two men with their faces covered in scarves shot and killed him. Witnesses were unable to identify any of the gunmen, and competing theories exist today as to their identities.

=== Apalachin meeting and prison ===
Genovese at the time of his arrest August 2, 1958, in New York City

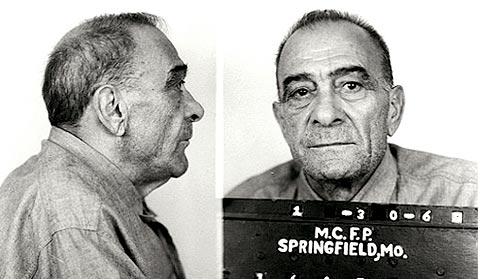
Genovese mugshot taken at Springfield, Missouri in 1969

In November 1957, immediately after the Anastasia murder, after taking control of the Luciano crime family from Costello, Genovese wanted to legitimize his new power by holding a national Cosa Nostra meeting. Genovese selected Buffalo, New York boss and Commission member Stefano "The Undertaker" Magaddino to organize the meeting; he in turn chose northeastern Pennsylvania crime boss Joseph Barbara and his underboss Russell Bufalino to oversee all the arrangements for it. Cuba was one of the topics of discussion, particularly the gambling and narcotics smuggling interests of Cosa Nostra on the island. The international narcotics trade was also an important topic on the agenda. The New York garment industry interests and rackets, such as loansharking to the business owners and control of garment center trucking, were other important topics on the agenda.

On November 14, 1957, powerful mafiosi from the United States and Italy convened at Barbara's estate in Apalachin, New York. The meeting agenda included the resolution of open questions on illegal gambling and narcotics dealing, particularly in the New York City area. State trooper Edgar D. Croswell had become aware that Barbara's son was reserving rooms in local hotels along with the delivery of a large quantity of meat from a local butcher to the Barbara home. That made Croswell suspicious, and he therefore decided to keep an eye on Barbara's house. When the state police found many luxury cars parked at Barbara's home they began taking down license plate numbers. Having found that many of these cars were registered to known criminals, state police reinforcements came to the scene and began to set up a roadblock. When the mobsters discovered the police presence, they started fleeing the gathering by car and by foot. Many Mafiosi escaped through the woods surrounding the Barbara estate. The police stopped a car driven by Bufalino, whose passengers included Genovese and three other men, at a roadblock as they left the estate; Bufalino said that he had come to visit his sick friend, Barbara. Genovese said he was just there for a barbecue and to discuss business with Barbara. The police let him go.

On June 2, 1958, Genovese testified under subpoena in the U.S. Senate McClellan Hearings on organized crime. Genovese refused to answer any questions, citing the Fifth Amendment rights under the U.S. Constitution 150 separate times.

Luciano allegedly helped pay part of $100,000 to a Puerto Rican drug dealer to falsely implicate Genovese in a drug deal. On July 7, 1958, Genovese was indicted on charges of conspiring to import and sell narcotics. The government's star witness was Nelson Cantellops, a Puerto Rican drug dealer who claimed Genovese met with him. On April 4, 1959, Genovese was convicted in New York of conspiracy to violate federal narcotics laws. On April 17, 1959, Genovese was sentenced to 15 years in the Atlanta Federal Penitentiary in Atlanta, where he tried to run his crime family from prison. When the Supreme Court declined to review his case he hired the lawyer Edward Bennett Williams. In October 1963 Williams appeared before the Court of Appeals, which rejected Genovese's appeal. In his book, Five Families, longtime New York Times organized-crime reporter Selwyn Raab wrote that a number of detectives, lawyers and organized crime experts have questioned the legitimacy of Genovese's conviction. For instance, longtime NYPD detective Ralph Salerno argued that "anyone who understands the protocol and insulation procedures" of the Mafia would find it "almost unbelievable" that a crime boss would be directly involved in a drug operation.

In September 1959, Genovese allegedly ordered the murder of mobster Anthony Carfano. Angered at the murder attempt on Costello, Carfano had skipped the Apalachin meeting in protest. In response, Genovese decided to murder him. On September 25, 1959, Carfano and a female companion were found shot to death in his Cadillac automobile on a residential street in Jackson Heights, Queens.

In April 1962, Genovese allegedly ordered the murder of Anthony Strollo after concluding that Strollo was part of the plot that put him in prison. On April 8, Strollo left his house to go for a walk and was never seen again. His body was never recovered.

In 1962, an alleged murder threat from Genovese propelled mobster Joseph Valachi into the public spotlight. In June, Genovese supposedly accused Valachi, also imprisoned in Atlanta, of being an informer and gave Valachi the kiss of death. In July, Valachi supposedly mistook another inmate for a mob hitman and killed him. A $100,000 bounty for Valachi's death had been placed by Genovese. After receiving a life sentence for that murder, Valachi decided to become a government witness.

On August 24, 1964, Ernest Rupolo's body was recovered from Jamaica Bay, Queens. His killers had attached two concrete blocks to his legs and tied his hands. It was widely assumed that Genovese had ordered Rupolo's murder for testifying against him in the 1944 Boccia murder trial.

== Death ==
Genovese died of a heart attack at the United States Medical Center for Federal Prisoners in Springfield, Missouri, on February 14, 1969. He is buried in Saint John Cemetery in Middle Village, Queens.

American Mafia
Preceded by Lucky Luciano	Genovese crime family Underboss; 1931–1936	Succeeded by Frank "Chee" Gusage
Preceded by Lucky Luciano as boss	Genovese crime family Acting boss 1936–1937	Succeeded by Frank Costello
Preceded by Willie Moretti	Genovese crime family Underboss; 1951–1957	Succeeded by Gerardo "Gerry" Catena
Preceded by Frank Costello	Genovese crime family Boss; 1957–1969	Succeeded by Philip "Benny Squint" Lombardo
Preceded by Frank Costello	Capo di tutti capi Boss of bosses 1957–1959	Succeeded by Joseph Bonanno as chairman of the commission
