= Joey Merlino =

American former mobster (born 1962)

- Merlino in a 1995 surveillance photo
- Born: Joseph Salvatore Merlino; March 13, 1962 (age 64); Philadelphia, Pennsylvania, U.S.
- Other names: "Skinny Joey"; "The Skinny Don"
- Occupations: Podcaster; former crime boss
- Spouse: Deborah Merlino (m. 1997)
- Children: 2
- Parent(s): Salvatore "Chuckie" Merlino; Rita Giordano
- Allegiance: Philadelphia crime family
- Convictions: Interstate theft and conspiracy (1990); Racketeering (2001); Illegal gambling (2018)
- Penalty: Three years' imprisonment (1990); 14 years' imprisonment (2001); Two years' imprisonment (2018)

Joseph Salvatore "Skinny Joey" Merlino (born March 13, 1962) is an American businessman, restaurant owner and former mobster who was the reputed boss of the Philadelphia crime family from the 1990s until 2024. He rose to power and seized control of the organization in the mid-nineties after he fought against the John Stanfa faction of the family. He led the crime family in gambling, loan sharking, drug trafficking, and extortion. In comparison to other traditional mob bosses who shunned the limelight, Merlino has interacted regularly with the media and the public, often openly providing charity and hosting events to benefit indigent people in Philadelphia, drawing comparisons to the similarly outgoing, conspicuous, and ostensibly charitable late New York crime boss John Gotti. He is the son of deceased Philadelphia crime family underboss Chuckie Merlino.

With the help of boss-turned-informant Ralph Natale, Merlino was convicted of several RICO charges including racketeering, illegal gambling and extortion, in 2001, and sentenced to 14 years in prison. Following his release from prison in 2011, the FBI and organized crime reporters believed he continued to run the Philadelphia–South Jersey Mafia. Merlino disputed this, saying he had retired from a life of crime. As of 2015, Merlino was dividing his time between South Florida and Philadelphia. After beginning a career as a social media personality, Merlino was reportedly demoted and expelled from the Philadelphia Mafia in 2024.

Although Merlino has never been convicted of murder, it is believed Merlino had participated in at least 18 murders, including Louis DeLuca in May 1990, Felix Bocchino in January 1992, Jimmy DiAddorio in May 1992, Rod Colombo in January 1993, Nicasio Zagone in January 1994, Michael Brennan in December 1994, Ralph Mazzuca in February 1995, William Veasey in October 1995, Michael Avicolli in April 1996, Joseph Sodano in December 1996, Anthony Turra in March 1998, Guerino Marconi in April 1999, Ronald Turchi in October 1999, Raymond Martorano in January 2002, John Casasanto in November 2003, Rocco Maniscalco in June 2010, and Gino DiPietro in December 2012. Merlino also may have participated in 4 attempted murders, including Nicky Scarfo Jr. in October 1989, shooting Scarfo Jr. eight times by using a Mac-10 submachine gun, Joseph Ciancaglini Jr. in March 1993, John Stanfa in August 1993 and Anthony Milicia in May 1996. In July 2001, Merlino was acquitted of murder charges, including 3 murders and 2 attempted murders, and also in March 2004, he was acquitted of the December 1996 murder of Joseph Sodano.

== Early life ==
Merlino was born on March 13, 1962, in Philadelphia to Italian-American parents Salvatore "Chuckie" Merlino and Rita Giordano. Merlino was raised in South Philadelphia and Ventnor City, New Jersey. He is also the nephew of deceased Philadelphia crime family mobster-turned government witness Lawrence "Yogi" Merlino. Joey's sister, Maria, was briefly engaged to Salvatore Testa.

He had been friends with future made man in the Philadelphia crime family Michael "Mikey Chang" Ciancaglini and his brother Joseph "Joey Chang" Ciancaglini Jr. since attending St. Thomas Aquinas grade school in Philadelphia's Point Breeze neighborhood. Merlino's father owned and operated the 9M Bar in Southwark that Nicky Scarfo used as his criminal headquarters during his attempt to become the new boss of the Philadelphia crime family.

== Criminal activity ==
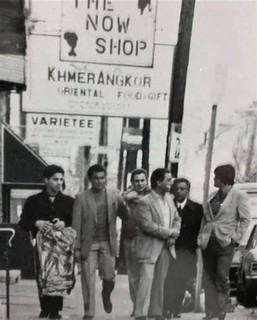
Joey Merlino, Phil Leonetti, Salvatore Merlino, Lawrence Merlino, Nicky Scarfo, and Salvatore Testa c. 1980s

In August 1982 at age 20, Merlino and Salvatore Scafidi, son of bookmaker Gaetano Scafidi Sr., beat and stabbed two male patrons at the Lido Restaurant in Atlantic City. In 1984 Merlino was found guilty on two counts of aggravated assault and one count of possession of a weapon for unlawful purpose. In August 1984 he was banned by the New Jersey Casino Control Commission from New Jersey casinos. His father Salvatore would also be banned by the same commission as his son for his criminal activities on May 23, 1984. Nicky Scarfo demoted his father Salvatore from his position as underboss to soldier because of his father's alcoholism. In 1988 Salvatore was sentenced to 45 years in federal prison for two counts of racketeering and drug trafficking.

Joseph Merlino has been described as a particularly vicious person, obsessed with his own public image, and another version of New York's John Gotti. "Joey was a party guy," said mob associate Ron Previte, a police officer-turned gangster-turned government witness. "He liked to go out. He liked to gamble. He liked the high life." He invited TV crews to his annual Christmas party for the homeless, and was a fixture at the city's nightclubs, restaurants, and sporting events. Along with his longtime buddies and future mobsters, he was known to beat up people, rob people, and start fights in clubs.

On October 31, 1989, Nicky Jr., the son of imprisoned Philadelphia family boss Nicky Scarfo Sr., was shot in an Italian restaurant in Bella Vista. The younger Scarfo was shot eight times with a MAC-10, but was not hit in any vital organs. He quickly recovered and left the hospital less than two weeks later. No one was ever charged with the attempted murder, but the Federal Bureau of Investigation (FBI) and local law enforcement believe Merlino carried out the shooting to settle a score between the Scarfos and Merlinos and to show that the elder Scarfo had no more power in Philadelphia. Merlino denied any involvement and claimed he was at home under house arrest the night of the shooting. Years later when a TV reporter approached Merlino and asked about a rumored $500,000 bounty on his life, Merlino responded "Give me the half million dollars and I’ll shoot myself."

In August 1989, Merlino was charged with interstate theft and conspiracy charges stemming from an incident where $352,000 was stolen from a Federal Armored Express truck in 1987. In January 1990, Merlino was convicted of planning the heist and sentenced to three years in prison.

=== Mob wars ===
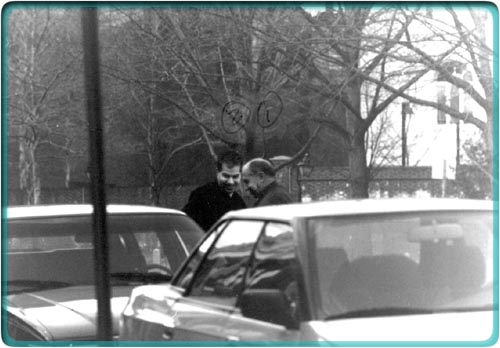
Gaetano "Horsehead" Scafidi (left) was a childhood friend of Merlino. He eventually switched allegiance to John Stanfa (right) in the 1990s. In 2000, he became a government witness and testified at Merlino's trial.

Merlino served his sentence at the Federal Correctional Institution, McKean, where he met mobster Ralph Natale in 1990. Natale was a longtime mobster who was serving a 15-year prison sentence for arson and drug trafficking. According to Natale, he and Merlino began plotting to take over the Philadelphia crime family during this period. Natale named Michael Ciancaglini, Steven Mazzone, George Borgesi, Gaetano "Tommy Horsehead" Scafidi and Martin Angelina as Merlino's key associates and co-conspirators in the plan.

These men were all close friends of Merlino since high school and started moving in on criminal rackets in Philadelphia. When John Stanfa emerged as the new leader of the Philadelphia family in 1991, the young group of mobsters openly rebelled against him. The "Young Turks", as the press would eventually dub Merlino's tight-knit crew, struck first with the killing of Felix Bocchino on January 29, 1992. Merlino was released from prison in April 1992.

In an attempt to quell further violence, Stanfa officially inducted Merlino and his best friend Michael Ciancaglini into the crime family in the late summer of 1992. Stanfa hoped he would be able to keep tabs on the Merlino crew and make it easier to kill them if necessary. While this act of diplomacy temporarily ended the violence, by 1993 an all-out war broke out between Stanfa and Merlino. On August 5, 1993, Merlino survived a drive-by shooting assassination attempt by two Stanfa gunmen, taking four bullets in the leg and buttocks, while Ciancaglini was shot in the chest and died.

On August 31, 1993, a drive-by shooting was performed on Stanfa and his son while they were driving on the Schuylkill Expressway. Stanfa escaped uninjured and his son survived being shot in the jaw. On September 17, 1993, a friend of Merlino's was shot and killed by Stanfa gunmen. Stanfa gunman Philip Colletti testified in court that he planted a remote control bomb under Merlino's car several times, but that it failed to go off every time. In November 1993, Merlino was arrested by the FBI, charged with violation of his supervised release, and sent back to prison.

=== Mob leader ===
Stanfa was arrested for Racketeer Influenced and Corrupt Organizations Act violations in March 1994, was convicted in 1995, and sentenced to life in 1996. With most of Stanfa's supporters also arrested and convicted, Merlino, released from prison in November 1994, won the war and named Ralph Natale as the new boss while positioning himself as his underboss. During Natale's reign, Merlino was the real power in the family, allowing Natale to become boss to direct law enforcement attention away from himself.

Nevertheless, Merlino gained notoriety as a flamboyant, celebrity gangster who often went out partying with a large entourage. The press dubbed him the John Gotti of Passyunk Avenue due to his candid demeanor in front of news cameras (Passyunk Avenue being a street in South Philadelphia). He also invited the press when he held Christmas parties for the homeless and gave away turkeys at Thanksgiving in housing projects.

The arrogance and aggressiveness of Merlino's young faction turned off a lot of criminals from working with the crime family. Merlino would often make big bets with bookies and refuse to pay when he lost. This practice, known as guzzling, was used on both independent and mob-run bookies. During this time, Merlino and Natale oversaw the crime family's gambling, loan sharking, extortion and stolen goods rackets.

In 1995, Louis Turra, leader of the Philadelphia drug gang the 10th & Oregon Crew, was severely beaten by Merlino's men, allegedly for failing to pay a Mafia street tax on the gang's illegal earnings. Angered by the beating, Turra sought vengeance. His father Anthony hosted a meeting at his house during which Anthony, Louis and his gang discussed killing Merlino. In January 1998, Louis Turra apparently hanged himself in a New York City jail while awaiting trial. In March 1998, Anthony Turra, on trial on charges of plotting to kill Merlino, was shot dead outside his home by a gunman in a black ski mask. He was shot twice as he left for the federal courthouse. "We consider this an organized crime assassination, a mob hit," Police Inspector Jerrold Kane said. Three years later, Merlino was put on trial for helping orchestrate the murder, but was acquitted.

By the late 1990s, Merlino dodged more than two dozen attempts on his life. Merlino was friends with Steve "Gorilla" Mondevergine, president of the Pagan's Motorcycle Club. Merlino sometimes used the Pagans to help settle underworld disputes. During the 1990s, Merlino was also aligned with members of the Junior Black Mafia. Following Natale's arrest for parole violation in 1999, Merlino officially took over the crime family, cutting off Natale.

=== Racketeering conviction ===
On June 28, 1999, Merlino was indicted and detained without bail on one charge of conspiracy to distribute more than five kilograms of cocaine and one charge of unlawful use of a communication facility in relation to a drug trafficking offense. The charges were later expanded to include racketeering and ordering or approving three murders and two attempted murders. Six other men were also put on trial. The prosecution's case was aided by several of Merlino's former Mafia cohorts agreeing to cooperate with the government. Natale agreed to cooperate in order to escape drug trafficking charges in 1999.

Gaetano "Tommy Horsehead" Scafidi agreed to cooperate in 2000 while finishing a prison sentence due to fears that he would be murdered by Merlino's crew. Peter "the Crumb" Caprio agreed to cooperate with the government in 2000 after being charged with two murders and Ron Previte testified after becoming an undercover informant several years prior. They all testified that Natale and Merlino started a mob war to take over the Philadelphia crime family and that Merlino committed various criminal acts in the 1990s.

On July 20, 2001, the jury returned a mixed verdict. Merlino was acquitted of all three counts of murder and two counts of attempted murder. He was found guilty of racketeering charges including extortion, bookmaking and receiving stolen property. Along with Merlino, six of his peers were also convicted of various racketeering-related charges. On December 3, 2001, Judge Herbert J. Hutton gave Merlino a 14-year prison sentence. Commenting on his conviction, "Ain't bad," Merlino said. "Better than the death penalty."

A month after the verdict, Merlino was indicted in federal court again for the 1996 murder of Joseph Sodano, despite a jury finding the murder charge "not proven" as a RICO predicate act. In March 2004, Merlino was acquitted of Sodano's murder as a violent crime in aid of racketeering.

Merlino served his prison sentence at the Federal Correctional Institution in Terre Haute, Indiana. Merlino was released from the correctional facility on March 15, 2011, after serving almost 12 years of his sentence. He was transferred to a halfway house in Florida for six months and then was on supervised release until 2015. On January 4, 2015, just before his parole restrictions expired, Judge Richard Barclay Surrick gave Merlino a four-month prison sentence for violating his supervised release by meeting with organized crime figures in Florida. On April 24, 2015, Merlino was released from the Federal Detention Center, Miami after his sentence was vacated. He was released 10 days early and was free of any post-release restrictions after he won an appeal from the U.S. Court of Appeals for the Third Circuit.

=== Move to Florida ===
After his release in 2011, Merlino moved to Boca Raton, Florida. In a 2013 interview with George Anastasia, Merlino denied any current involvement in the Philadelphia Mafia and has stated that his life as a criminal is over. He was quoted in the interview stating "I want no part of that" and that there were "too many rats." In November 2014, Merlino opened a restaurant in Boca Raton named Merlino's, that featured his mother's recipes. The restaurant was owned by a group of investors; Merlino is forbidden from owning an establishment that serves alcohol due to his criminal record. Instead, Merlino officially worked there as a maître d' until the restaurant closed in 2016. According to the Philadelphia Gaming Control Board, Merlino was involved in an assault during the early hours at a blackjack table whilst at the Rivers Casino in Philadelphia in March 2016. On September 7, 2016, the Pennsylvania Gaming Control Board banned Merlino from all casinos in Pennsylvania.

On August 4, 2016, Merlino was one of 46 people arrested up and down the East Coast in a RICO indictment named Operation East Coast Enterprise. Merlino was arrested at his home in Florida and put on trial in New York City. Merlino was charged with one count of racketeering, one count of fraud and two counts of illegal gambling. Merlino was accused of entering into illegal business arrangements with New York criminals in the Genovese crime family. Merlino was also accused of participating in illegal conduct with the Gambino, Lucchese and Bonanno families from New York, including loansharking, illegal gambling, credit card fraud, health care fraud, extortion, arson, assault, conspiracy, racketeering, cigarette trafficking and firearms trafficking. Merlino was also accused of taking part in a massive medical fraud scheme in Florida that had doctors prescribe patients with unnecessary (and ineffective) medical products and billing patients' insurance companies. On August 12, Merlino was released on a $5 million bond.

The other 45 men charged in the broad indictment accepted favorable plea bargains and pleaded guilty to reduced charges. Merlino refused any plea offer and went to trial on January 30, 2018. The trial concluded after two weeks of testimony. On February 20, Judge Richard J. Sullivan declared a mistrial after the jury failed to reach a unanimous verdict.

To avoid a retrial, Merlino entered into a plea deal with federal prosecutors on April 27. He agreed to plead guilty to one charge of facilitating illegal gambling transactions via an electronic device in exchange for the U.S. Attorney's Office dropping the remaining charges against him and recommending a prison sentence between 10 and 16 months. On October 17, Merlino was sentenced to the maximum of two years in prison. In October 2019, Merlino was granted an early release and moved to a halfway house to finish the rest of his sentence, later given supervised release in South Florida.

In January 2023, Merlino reappeared in the news when he posed for a photograph with then former U.S. president Donald Trump at a Trump-owned golf club, with both men making a "thumbs up" gesture.

In September 2023, Merlino started the sports betting podcast "The Skinny with Joey Merlino". Merlino gives football picks weekly.

As a result of his status as a social media personality, Merlino was reportedly demoted and excommunicated by the Philadelphia family in 2024, and replaced as boss by George Borgesi. Merlino's expulsion and designation as persona non grata among Cosa Nostra marked the first time a Mafia boss on the East Coast had been banished without breaking the oath of omertà.

Merlino reportedly planned to open a cheesesteak business in late 2024 in South Philadelphia called Skinny Joey's Cheesesteaks. On May 23, 2024, the restaurant suffered minor damage from a firebombing where several Molotov cocktails were found at the scene. Skinny Joey's Cheesesteaks opened for business in March 2025 located at 3020 South Broad Street in Philadelphia. In June 2026, Merlino opened up a second Skinny Joey's Cheesesteaks restaurant located at 2812 Magnolia Avenue on the Wildwood Boardwalk in New Jersey.

=== List of murders Merlino allegedly participated in ===
Between March and May 2001, former boss Ralph Natale testified against Joey Merlino. Natale had been involved in the Philadelphia family dating back to at least the 1960s during the Angelo Bruno-era, having committed a murder for Bruno in 1970. Natale and Merlino first met in 1990 at the Federal Correctional Institution McKean in Pennsylvania. Natale was serving a 27-year prison sentence since 1979 for firebombing a furniture store and participating in a major drug deal involving 500,000 quaaludes and 10 kilos of cocaine, and Merlino was serving a 3-year prison sentence since January 1990 for the robbery from a Federal Armored Express truck worth $352,000. During the 1990s, Merlino and Natale conspired to seize control of the Philadelphia family from John Stanfa, and by around 1994 or 1995, Natale became the boss of the family with Merlino as the underboss following the arrest and life imprisonment sentence of Stanfa for charges including murder, extortion, kidnapping and obstruction of justice, although it was later alleged Merlino was the real boss with Natale taking the heat from law enforcement as the disguised leader. During testimony in 2001, Natale identified Merlino as the shooter involved in the October 1989 attempted murder of Lucchese family soldier, 24-year old Nicky Scarfo Jr. Natale said Merlino disliked Scarfo Jr. and the shooting located inside of the Dante & Luigi's restaurant on 10th and Catharine Streets in South Philadelphia was also made to send a message to his father, Nicodemo Scarfo, that Scarfo no longer held power within the Philadelphia family. Scarfo Jr. was shot 8 times by using a Mac-10 submachine gun. Natale testified that Merlino orchestrated the May 1990 murder of 51-year old Louis DeLuca and the January 1992 murder of 72-year old Felix Bocchino whilst behind bars in prison, with DeLuca alleged to have negatively gossiped about Merlino and his faction and was fatally shot 4 times near his home on Shunk Street in South Philadelphia, and Bocchino was shot 3 times and killed near his home located on the 1200 block of Mifflin Street in South Philadelphia for extorting bookmakers aligned with the Merlino faction. Tommy "Horsehead" Scafidi testified that Merlino hired him to be the lookout during the May 1992 murder of 55-year old Jimmy DiAddorio who was shot 6 times and killed located at the Vulpine Athletic Club in Philadelphia, and also testified that Merlino himself was the lookout in the attempted murder of 34-year old Joseph Ciancaglini Jr. in March 1993, Ciancaglini was shot 5 times and survived however he was left paralysed and permanently disabled, he was shot at a luncheonette located on Warfield Street near Wharton Street in Grays Ferry, Philadelphia. According to federal prosecutors, the Merlino faction shot 29-year old Rod Colombo 3 times in the back of his head in January 1993 whilst inside of his car located on Ward Avenue in Audubon, New Jersey, the first casualty of the 1990s Merlino-Stanfa war, and the Merlino faction were responsible for the January 1994 murder of 32-year old Nicasio Zagone, the nephew of John Stanfa, although several investigators alleged that Zagone was killed as a mistaken identity with the intended target being the Stanfa associate, Frank Gulino. Previously in August 1993, according to the testimony of a mob turncoat, Merlino served as the lookout during the August 1993 attempted murder of boss John Stanfa as retribution for the murder of a Merlino capo, 30-year old Michael Ciancaglini who died from a fatal gunshot wound to the chest, Merlino who was with Ciancaglini at the time of his death, was shot 3 times in the buttocks and survived, Stanfa was ambushed on the Schuylkill Expressway and escaped, leaving his 23-year old son with a gunshot wound to the face and jaw, who also survived. According to informants, Merlino orchestrated and served as the shooter in the December 1994 murder of 38-year old Michael Brennan over an alleged falling out over the illegal gambling and drug trafficking rackets, and according to informants, Brennan was wrapped in a blanket and dumped in a wooded area in Camden County, New Jersey. According to the testimony of Roger Vella, a cocaine dealer and driver for Joey Merlino, the Merlino faction had murdered 29-year old Ralph Mazzuca, specifically Mazzuca was shot 3 times in the back and once in his head, hog-tied and his body was set on fire, as Mazzuca had broken into the home of the parents of Vella, Mazzuca's body was found at the Food Distribution Center on Packer Avenue in South Philadelphia. During testimony, Natale implicated Merlino in planning the murder of 35-year old William Veasey in October 1995 who was fatally shot 6 times in his car located near the corner of 17th Street and Oregon Avenue in South Philadelphia, Veasey was murdered on the day his brother John Veasey was set to testify and as retribution for the murder's John Veasey committed against the Merlino faction during the war, and that Merlino ordered the April 1996 murder of 52-year old Michael Avicolli who was held responsible for having an affair with the wife of Steven Mazzone, Merlino's underboss and second in command, Avicolli was shot once in the head and his body was reportedly buried on farm property in Northern New Jersey, his body and car have never been recovered, according to FBI informants, Mazzone, Merlino and Genovese family associate, Stefano Mazzola, committed the Avicolli murder. Natale also recalled that Merlino served as the driver during the May 1996 attempted murder of Anthony Milicia who had refused to pay tribute money to the Philadelphia family from his vending and video poker business, Milicia was shot once in the left side of his body by Merlino faction member, Frank Gambino, and survived, located outside a bar located on 13th and Dickinson Streets in South Philadelphia. Peter Caprio testified that Merlino ordered the December 1996 murder of 53-year old Joseph Sodano for several reasons including that Sodano refused to meet Merlino when he was called upon, refusal to pay tribute money from his illegal gambling operation, and for his previous loyalty to John Stanfa, Sodano was shot twice in the head and killed inside of his minivan located on North Sixth Street in Newark, New Jersey. According to police, Merlino orchestrated the March 1998 murder of 61-year old Anthony Turra, Turra's son, Louis Turra, the boss of the 10th & Oregon Crew, was involved in a feud with Merlino beginning with the beaten of Louis Turra in 1995 for refusing to pay street tax to the Philadelphia family, it is believed possibly Merlino or his affiliates became aware of Turra's intention of attempting to assassinate Merlino following an indictment in August 1997 detailing Turra's plan to bomb Merlino's home with grenades, Louis Turra died in January 1998 from suicide inside of a federal jail cell in Manhattan with rumours of involvement by the Philadelphia family, though never proven, Anthony Turra was shot twice and killed located outside of his home on South 20th Street near Passyunk Avenue in South Philadelphia. According to federal informants, Merlino ordered the April 1999 murder of 42-year old Guerino "Gino" Marconi for refusing to pay a street tax on his drug sales, located outside of his home on the 2400 block of South 20th Street in South Philadelphia, Marconi was shot once in the head and killed allegedly by the now defunct Boston-Merlino crew. According to law enforcement, Merlino along with Joseph "Uncle Joe" Ligambi, orchestrated the murder of 61-year old Ronald Turchi, Turchi had previously served as the Philadelphia family consigliere during the mid-1990s before he was demoted, and was alleged to have been murdered for offering the Gambino family $10,000 in return to being recognised as the official boss of the Philadelphia family, Turchi was found in the trunk of a car belonging to his wife located on Passyunk Avenue near Christian Street, Turchi was found naked, hog-tied, a plastic bag over his head and shot twice in his head. Alleged by law enforcement, 74-year old Raymond Martorano was ordered to be killed by Ligambi and Merlino as Martorano had attempted to re-establish his lucrative gambling and drug operations without the approval of Ligambi or Merlino, following his release from prison in November 1999 after serving over 17 years in prison for operating a major methamphetamine drug operation and for the December 1980 murder of John McCullough, Martorano was shot 3 times and succumbed to his injuries in hospital a month after. Also according to law enforcement, the murder of 35-year old John Casasanto in November 2003 was ordered by the Ligambi-Merlino faction as Casasanto was accused of having an affair with the wife of Merlino whilst Merlino was in prison serving a 14-year prison sentence for extortion, illegal gambling and loansharking, Casasanto was also accused of personally insulting members of the Merlino faction and he was also allegedly killed for being an early John Stanfa faction loyalist during the 1990s, Casasanto was shot twice in the back of his head and once in the back inside the kitchen of his home located on Durfor Street near 12th Street in Philadelphia. According to investigative reporters, the Merlino-Ligambi faction ordered the death of 38-year old Rocco Maniscalco as Maniscalco refused extortion and protection payments made by the Philadelphia family, Maniscalco was fatally shot 13 times located near the 1700 block of Wolf Street in South Philadelphia. The FBI in Philadelphia alleged Merlino ordered the murder of 50-year old Gino DiPietro in December 2012 as DiPietro may have been accused of being a federal informant, DiPietro was shot 5 times in the back by a magnum pistol located on Iseminger Street near Johnston Street.
