= Ron Previte =

American gangster (1943–2017)

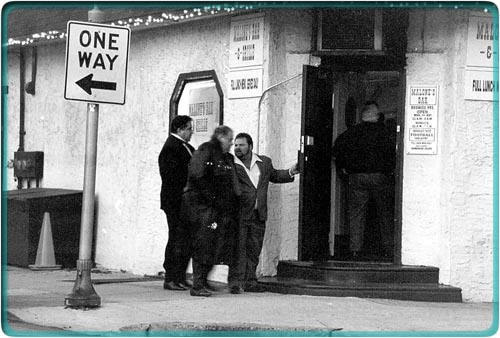
- Previte (middle), in an FBI surveillance photo in South Philadelphia.
- Born: Ronald Previte; October 9, 1943; Philadelphia, Pennsylvania, U.S.
- Died: August 21, 2017 (aged 73); Galloway Township, New Jersey, U.S.
- Occupations: Police officer, mob informant
- Allegiance: Philadelphia crime family

Ronald Previte (October 9, 1943 – August 21, 2017) was an American corrupt police officer for the Philadelphia Police Department and a member of and an informant against the Philadelphia crime family of the Italian-American Mafia.

Previte was born in 1943 in Philadelphia to Sicilian-American parents but was raised in Hammonton, New Jersey, and attended Hammonton High School. Previte joined with the United States Air Force, and when he returned, he joined the Philadelphia Police Department. During his time in the police force, Previte extorted traffic violators, shook down restaurant owners, stripped impounded cars, stole from crime scenes and solicited payoffs from bookies and mobsters. Previte was forced to resign from the police force in 1979. By 1981, he began working as a security officer for the Tropicana Casino & Resort Atlantic City and was soon operating as an associate of the Philadelphia crime family, swiping cash and chips from the casino, stealing trucks of furniture and bar supplies out of the casino warehouse, robbing money from guests, and running prostitutes and poker games out of unoccupied suites.

Previte was arrested for theft in 1985, but the charges were dropped after he agreed to work with New Jersey State Police. In 1992, Previte became an informant for the Federal Bureau of Investigation for which he was paid $750,000 between 1992 and 2002. By 1993, Previte was a big earner for the Philadelphia crime family and the personal driver for boss John Stanfa. Previte wore a wire for more than two-and-a-half years, recording more than 400 hours of conversations, also testifying during mob trials, which helped convict over 50 mobsters, including Joey Merlino and Ralph Natale. Following the trials, Previte turned down offers for witness relocation, and lived under an assumed name in Hammonton. Previte was an associate of the Philadelphia mafia and was never made an official member.

Previte is the subject of the 2004 book The Last Gangster by George Anastasia.

Previte died in a Galloway Township, New Jersey hospital on August 21, 2017, of a heart attack, aged 73.
