= John Alite =

American mobster (born 1962)

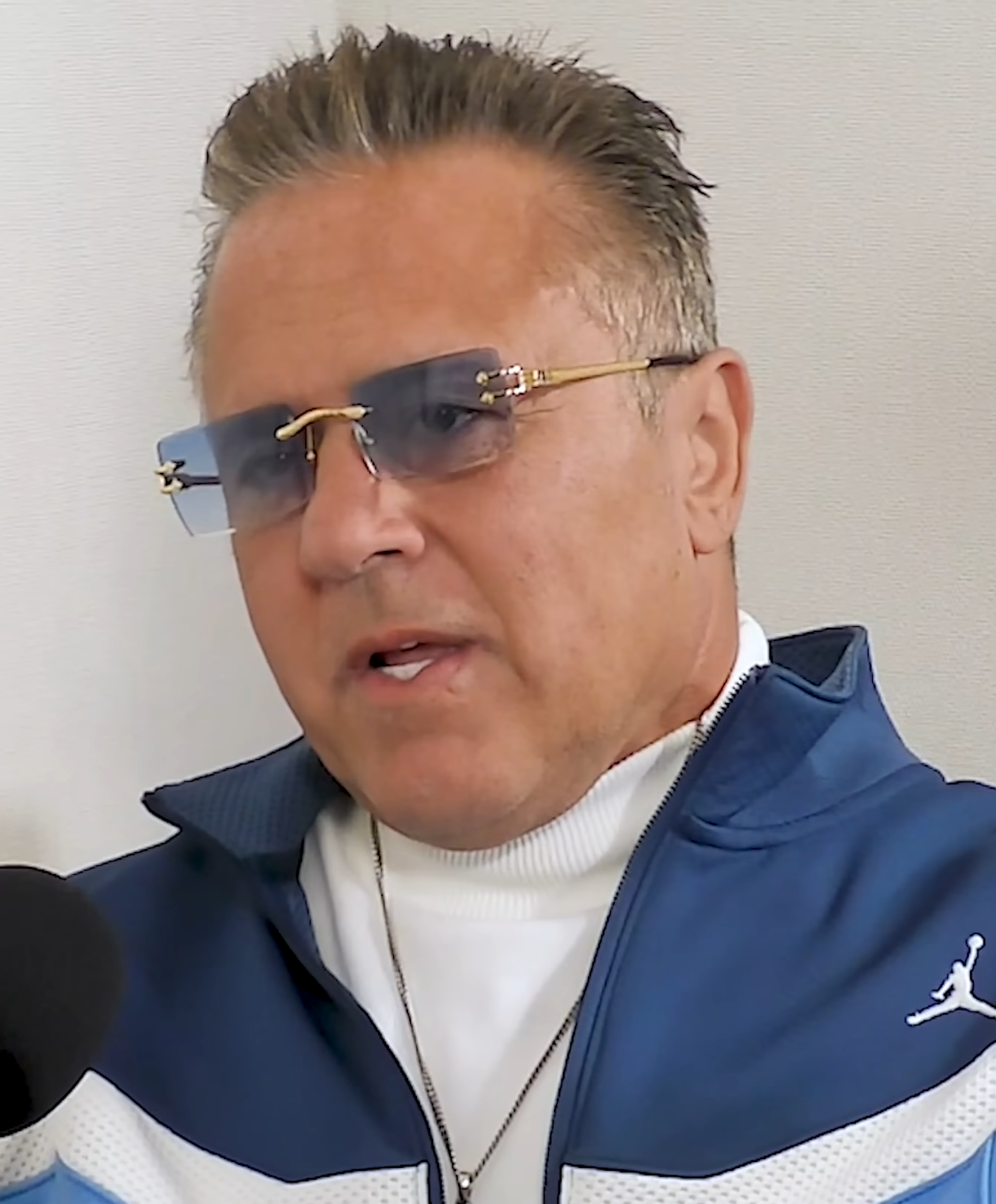
- Alite in 2023
- Born: John Edward Alite; September 30, 1962 (age 64); New York City, U.S.
- Other names: "The Calculator"; "The Sheriff"; "John Alletto"
- Occupations: Mobster (former); government witness; motivational speaker; podcaster; author; politician
- Children: 5
- Allegiance: Gambino crime family
- Convictions: Racketeering (including murder, conspiracy, and armed robbery; 2008)
- Penalty: 10 years' imprisonment (2011)
- Website: johnalite.com

John Edward Alite (born September 30, 1962) is an American former mobster and Gambino crime family associate who turned government witness and in 2008 testified against the family and its former acting boss, John A. "Junior" Gotti. That year, Alite pleaded guilty to racketeering charges, including two murders and a variety of other crimes, and in 2011 was sentenced to a total of 10 years in prison. Due to his cooperation with prosecutors, he was released on a five-year supervised release in 2012. Later in life, Alite publicly denounced organized crime and became a motivational speaker, podcaster, and author. In March 2025, he was appointed a councilman in Englishtown, New Jersey, as a member of the Republican Party.

== Early life ==
The son of a cab driver and a secretary, Alite was born on September 30, 1962, in the Queens borough of New York City and grew up in Woodhaven, Queens. His grandparents were Albanian immigrants from Gjirokastër. Alite grew up in the same neighborhood as John Gotti's son, John A. Gotti, with whom he was boyhood friends. He was Gotti's best man at his wedding in 1990. Alite received a baseball scholarship to the University of Tampa, but dropped out after three years.

== Criminal career ==
Alite's uncle ran a card game with Charles Luciano, a Queens-based soldier in the Gambino crime family (not to be confused with Charles "Lucky" Luciano), and he grew up aspiring to be a gangster. While working in a delicatessen as a teenager, Alite began running numbers for a local bookmaker associated with the Lucchese crime family. He later started selling small amounts of cocaine. After his career as a college baseball player at the University of Tampa was curtailed by an arm injury, Alite returned to New York and enrolled in Queens College. When his father learned of his drug dealing, Alite was sent to live with an uncle in California until he was arrested for assault a year later and he again came home to Queens, where, through his friend John Bonner, he became involved in drug dealing on a larger scale. Alite and Bonner's drug business came to the attention of Gambino associate John Angelo "Junior" Gotti, who demanded the pair begin "kicking up" a share of their narcotics sales to the family.

Alite became affiliated with the Gambino family but was ineligible to become a "made man" in the organization due to his non-Italian heritage. In mid-1984, Gotti recruited Alite to partake in a drive-by shooting on a gang of Jamaican marijuana dealers who had robbed John Gebert, Gotti's partner in a marijuana distribution racket. Alite successfully performed as a driver while Gebert shot two Jamaican gangsters from a car in Jamaica, Queens, elevating his standing in the Gambino family. In the 1980s and 1990s, he was an enforcer and "hitman" for a Queens-based drug gang headed by Gotti which allegedly distributed eight kilograms of cocaine per month. Alite was also a business partner of Gotti and was nicknamed "the Calculator" due to his financial acumen. Federal Bureau of Investigation (FBI) agent Ted Otto described Alite as "a hybrid gangster… an exception to the rule".

On December 20, 1988, Alite lured cocaine dealer George Grosso to the White Horse Tavern in Queens, persuaded him to get into a car under the pretense of driving to another bar, and then shot him three times in the head. Grosso's corpse was dumped off of the Grand Central Parkway in Flushing Meadows Park. "Junior" Gotti allegedly ordered Grosso's murder because Grosso had told people he was selling drugs on behalf of Gotti and his father, Gambino boss John Joseph Gotti.

Alite was charged with assault along with John A. Gotti and Steven Kaplan following an alleged brawl at a nightclub in Island Park, Long Island on June 11, 1989. However, a grand jury declined to indict the trio.

Shortly after he was promoted to caporegime in 1990, John A. Gotti assigned Alite to a hit team who were ordered to kill Gambino soldier Louie DiBono, who was marked for death after refusing an order from John J. Gotti. Alite was dispatched to Atlantic City to search for DiBono but failed to locate the mobster, who was ultimately killed by Charles Carneglia in an underground parking lot at the World Trade Center later that year.

Alite was also involved in the murder of Bruce John Gotterup, who was shot to death on a Rockaway boardwalk by John Burke on November 20, 1991, as retribution for stealing drug and gambling proceeds from Gambino family associates, as well as for being involved in an altercation with the nephew of a Gambino soldier.

In the mid-1990s, Alite relocated to the Philadelphia area, where he owned homes in the suburbs of Cherry Hill and Voorhees Township. He began associating with made members and associates of the Philadelphia crime family, as well as the independent 10th & Oregon Crew. Infighting in the Philadelphia Mafia between rival factions led by John Stanfa and Joey Merlino left the organization in disarray and allowed Alite to take control of the lucrative valet parking business on Delaware Avenue, as well as in South Jersey and Atlantic City, within a year of moving to the area.

Aside from being a source of legitimate income, Alite used his valet parking businesses as a means of laundering money he was making from drug dealing, gambling, and loansharking. One member of Alite's crew, Keith Pellegrino, was a drug supplier to the 10th & Oregon Crew. In 1994, 10th & Oregon gang leader Louie Turra reportedly attempted to solicit Alite as a hitman to kill Joey Merlino in a dispute over a "street tax", an offer which Alite turned down as he felt the Turra gang were "cowboys". He was also questioned by police over the November 1, 1994 homicide of Carol Neulander in Cherry Hill. The murdered woman's husband, Fred Neulander, was ultimately convicted in the killing.

Alite later led a crew in Tampa, Florida that extorted rival valet businesses, and reported to Gambino capo Ronald "Ronnie One-Arm" Trucchio. He also arranged for the purchase of Mirage, a Tampa nightclub.

In 1995, Charles Carneglia and Alite were involved in a major conspiracy to murder John A. Gotti. Later that year, Alite was arrested for illegal possession of a firearm in violation of a parole agreement and spent three years in prison. After his release, Alite earned an additional three months back in prison for acting as a go-between for corrupt prison guard Troy Kemmerer who was smuggling sperm donation kits in and out of Allenwood Federal Prison for inmate Antonino Parlavecchio, who was trying to impregnate his wife Maria.

As federal racketeering indictments were handed down for his group's activities in the Tampa area, Alite fled to Rio de Janeiro, Brazil in January 2004, where he lived and worked in the Copacabana neighborhood, according to the Brazilian Federal Police. He lived there for 10 months before authorities arrested him in November 2004. He served two years in prison in Brazil and was eventually extradited to federal authorities in Tampa for trial in 2006.

Alite has estimated that he shot between 30 and 40 people, beat about 100 people with a baseball bat, and murdered 7 people.

== Government witness and racketeering convictions ==
In January 2008, Alite pleaded guilty to racketeering charges that included two murders, four murder conspiracies, at least eight shootings, and two attempted shootings, as well as armed home invasions and armed robberies in New York, New Jersey, Pennsylvania, and Florida, stemming from his alleged involvement in a Gambino crew in Tampa, Florida. Alite agreed to testify in the trial of Gambino family enforcer Charles Carneglia, who was found guilty of four murders and is now serving a life sentence.

Alite was also a government witness in the unsuccessful racketeering trial against John Gotti Jr. Prosecutors indicted Gotti for racketeering and murder conspiracy charges, stemming from an alleged drug trafficking ring in Florida, and the murders of George Grosso in 1988, Louis DiBono in 1990, and Bruce John Gotterup in 1991. Alite testified that Gotti was responsible for at least eight murders, among other crimes.

Alite's testimony was largely undermined during cross examination. On December 1, 2009, the 12 jurors announced that they had failed to reach a unanimous verdict on all the charges against Gotti and the judge declared a mistrial and released Gotti. Interviewed after the trial, the jurors said that they did not find Alite to be credible. Federal prosecutors from Brooklyn and Tampa described Alite's cooperation as "extraordinary" and "substantial" when submitting statements to the judge responsible for sentencing Alite for two murders and other crimes.

On April 26, 2011, Alite was sentenced to a total of 10 years in prison. In January 2012, he was released on a five-year supervised release; in October 2015, a letter was written to the U.S. Probation Office claiming that Alite broke the terms of his supervised release in a New Jersey gun case which prompted an investigation that sent Alite back to prison for three months.

== Later life ==
Alite later became a youth motivational speaker on avoiding crime. He co-wrote four books, Gotti's Rules (2015), Darkest Hour (2018), Prison Rules (2019), and Mafia International (2021). In March 2015, he appeared in The Mafia with Trevor McDonald. In July 2020, he appeared in the Netflix docuseries Fear City: New York vs the Mafia. In March, 2020, he started his own podcast, Mafia Truths with John Alite. In September 2021, Alite was the subject of an episode of National Geographic's Locked Up Abroad.

Alite's first wife was Carol, and his second wife was Claudia DiPippa; he has five children. One of his daughters, Chelsea, died at the age of 20 when she unknowingly took a fake, pressed Percocet laced with fentanyl, causing a fatal overdose.

In 2025, Alite, by then a resident of Englishtown, New Jersey, was appointed to fill a vacant seat on the borough's council. He is a Republican.

On June 19, 2026, Alite was arrested. The New Jersey Attorney General charged Alite with corporate misconduct, extortion, and other crimes. He is being held without bail at the Bergen County Jail in New Jersey.
