= Philip Testa =

American mobster (1924–1981)

- Testa's 1956 PPD mugshot
- Born: Philip Charles Testa; April 21, 1924; Philadelphia, Pennsylvania, U.S.
- Died: March 15, 1981 (aged 56); Philadelphia, Pennsylvania, U.S.
- Cause of death: Murder by bombing
- Resting place: Holy Cross Cemetery, Yeadon, Pennsylvania, U.S.
- Other names: "The Chicken Man"; "The Julius Caesar of the Philadelphia Mob"; "Philly"; "Lefty"
- Occupation: Crime boss
- Spouse: Alfia Arcidiacono
- Children: Salvatore and Maria
- Allegiance: Philadelphia crime family

Philip Charles Testa (April 21, 1924 – March 15, 1981), also known as "The Chicken Man", was an American mobster known for his brief leadership of the Philadelphia crime family of the Italian-American Mafia. He became boss of the Philadelphia crime family after the previous boss and his close friend, Angelo Bruno, was murdered by Bruno's own consigliere, Antonio Caponigro, who, in turn, was ordered killed by The Commission for murdering a boss without permission.

Testa's nickname came from his involvement in a poultry business. About a year after Bruno's death, Testa was killed by the blast of a nail bomb at his home in South Philadelphia. The assassination was allegedly ordered by Testa’s own underboss, Peter Casella, as part of the Second Philadelphia Mafia War.

== Early life ==
Testa was born to Sicilian immigrants in Philadelphia, Pennsylvania, and lived in South Philadelphia with his family in his teenage years. In South Philadelphia, he met and befriended future mob boss Angelo Bruno. He later married Alfia Arcidiacono (records show her family owned a farm in Salem County, New Jersey). In early police dossiers on Testa, he was identified by law enforcement as not having a legitimate source of income and was solely dependent on winnings as a "common gambler."

Testa and his wife had a son, Salvatore Testa, who also became involved in organized crime and was killed three years after his father.

== Criminal career ==
In 1970, Testa became underboss of Angelo Bruno. Bruno was murdered in a March 1980 assassination orchestrated by Antonio "Tony Bananas" Caponigro, who was subsequently killed for acting without the explicit sanctioning of the Commission. Testa then became boss of the Philadelphia family in April 1980, appointing Peter Casella his underboss and Nicodemo Scarfo as consigliere.

On February 21, 1981, one month before Testa was murdered, he, Frank Narducci Sr., Harry and Mario Riccobene, Pasquale Spirito, Joseph Ciancaglini and several associates were indicted in a federal racketeering case that centered on gambling and loansharking operations run by the Mob. The case was based on an investigation called Operation Gangplank and was one of the first built on the RICO Act by the U.S. Attorney's Office in Philadelphia.

== Death and aftermath ==
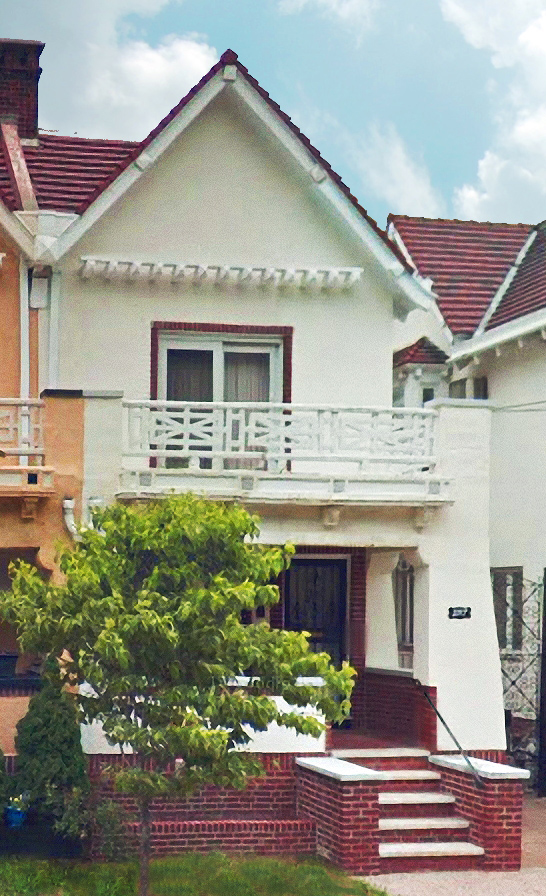
Testa's home at 2117 Porter Street in Philadelphia, where he was assassinated on March 15, 1981

On March 15, 1981, Testa returned to his home in South Philadelphia across the street from Stephen Girard Park. As he was opening the door to his twin home at 2117 Porter Street, a nail bomb exploded under his front porch. His death was allegedly ordered by his underboss and drug trafficker Peter Casella and capo Frank Narducci Sr., which later resulted in Narducci being gunned down and Casella being banished from the Mob and fleeing to Florida.

Testa was buried at Holy Cross Cemetery in Yeadon, near to the grave of Angelo Bruno.

Testa's murder sparked a war within the family. Nicodemo Scarfo seized the top position, promoting his longtime friend Chuckie Merlino as his underboss and Testa loyalist Frank Monte as his consigliere. Scarfo went on to lead the family for a decade with a bloody rampage, fueled by paranoia and aggression.

== In popular culture ==
Testa's violent death is referenced in the opening lines of musician Bruce Springsteen's song "Atlantic City". He was portrayed by Larry Romano in the film The Irishman.

== See also ==
- List of unsolved murders (1980–1999)

American Mafia
Preceded by Angelo Bruno	Philadelphia crime family Boss; 1980–1981	Succeeded by Nicodemo Scarfo
