= Angelo Bruno =

Sicilian-American mobster (1910–1980)

- Angelo and Sue Bruno
- Born: Angelo Annaloro; May 21, 1910; Villalba, Sicily, Kingdom of Italy
- Died: March 21, 1980 (aged 69); Philadelphia, Pennsylvania, U.S.
- Cause of death: Gunshot
- Resting place: Holy Cross Cemetery, Yeadon, Pennsylvania, U.S.
- Other names: "The Gentle Don", "The Docile Don"
- Occupation: Crime boss
- Spouse: Assunta "Sue" Maranca (m. 1931)
- Children: 2
- Allegiance: Bruno crime family

Angelo Bruno (born Angelo Annaloro, Italian: [ˈandʒelo annaˈlɔːro]; May 21, 1910 – March 21, 1980) was a Sicilian-American mobster who was boss of the Philadelphia crime family for two decades until his assassination. Bruno was known as "The Docile Don" due to his preference for conciliation over violence, in stark contrast to his successors.

== Early years ==
Born in Villalba, Province of Caltanissetta, Sicily, Bruno emigrated to the United States as a child and settled in South Philadelphia with his brother, Vito. He was the son of a foundry worker who opened a small grocery store at 4341 North Sixth Street in Feltonville, Philadelphia. Angelo helped his father at the store until 1922, at the age of twelve, when he first entered school but attended for only a few years before dropping out of South Philadelphia High School to open his own grocery store at Eighth and Annin streets in Passyunk Square, Philadelphia. Bruno was a close associate of New York Gambino crime family boss Carlo Gambino. Living with Bruno was a cousin of mobster John Simone. Bruno dropped the name Annaloro and replaced it with his paternal grandmother's maiden name, Bruno. His sponsor into the Philadelphia mafia was Michael Maggio, a convicted murderer with a national reputation, and the founder of M. Maggio Cheese Corp. (since bought up by Crowley Foods).

Bruno was married to Assunta "Sue" Maranca (1913–2007), his childhood sweetheart, from 1931 until his death. They had two children, Michael and Jean. Bruno owned an extermination company in Trenton, New Jersey and an aluminum products company in Hialeah, Florida. Bruno's first arrest was in 1928 for reckless driving. Subsequent arrests included firearms violations, operating an illicit alcohol still, illegal gambling, and receiving stolen property.

Bruno purchased shares in the Plaza Hotel in Havana, Cuba. Around 1957–58 Bruno spent a significant amount of time in Cuba.

== Family leader ==
In 1959, Bruno was made boss of the Philadelphia family after a period of friction with Antonio "Mr. Miggs" Pollina. Eventually a plot to have Bruno murdered was uncovered and Pollina was deposed by the commission but was allowed to live and operate. This was the first indicator of Bruno's aversion to violence as a solution. Over the next twenty years, Bruno successfully avoided the intense media and law enforcement scrutiny and outbursts of violence that plagued other crime families. Bruno avoided lengthy prison terms despite several arrests; his longest term was two years for refusing to testify before a grand jury. Bruno forbade family involvement in narcotics trafficking, preferring more traditional Cosa Nostra operations, such as bookmaking and loansharking. However, Bruno did permit other gangs to distribute heroin in Philadelphia for a share of the proceeds. This arrangement angered some family members who wanted a share of the drug-dealing profits.

Bruno preferred to operate through bribery and soft power rather than murder. For example, he banished violent soldier Nicodemo "Little Nicky" Scarfo to the then-backwater of Atlantic City, New Jersey, after he was charged with manslaughter.

Like the rest of the mafia, Bruno was under immense pressure from Attorney General Robert F. Kennedy, who was coming down hard on organized crime. An FBI surveillance operation in 1962 picked up Bruno and Willie Weisberg joking about killing the Attorney General. By mid 1963 Bruno's situation had gotten worse and he began to consider leaving America altogether and returning to Italy.

In December 1963 he was arrested on his return from Italy as he stepped off the plane.

== Rebellion and death ==
Angelo Bruno murder scene

On March 21, 1980, the 69-year-old Bruno was killed by a shotgun blast to the head as he sat in his car in front of his home near the intersection of 10th Street and Snyder Avenue in the Lower Moyamensing neighborhood of South Philadelphia; his driver, John Stanfa, was wounded. It is believed that the killing was ordered by Antonio Caponigro, Bruno's consigliere. A few weeks later, Caponigro's lifeless body was found, naked and battered, in the trunk of a car in the Bronx. The Commission had reportedly ordered Caponigro's murder because he assassinated Bruno without their sanction. Other Philadelphia family members found to be involved in Bruno's murder were tortured and killed.

The murder sparked a mob war in Philadelphia, which claimed 20 lives over the next four years, including the succeeding boss Philip "Chicken Man" Testa, and his son Salvatore Testa.

Bruno was buried at Holy Cross Cemetery in Yeadon. Less than a year later, his successor as Phialdelphia Mafia boss, Phil Testa, was buried at the same cemetery.

In February 2016, author and historian Celeste Morello began an effort to designate Bruno's home a historical landmark. In March 2016, a historical landmark advisory committee ruled against the request.

== In popular culture ==
Bruno is portrayed by Chazz Palminteri in the film Legend (2015) and Harvey Keitel in the film The Irishman (2019).

== See also ==
- Philadelphia crime family
- History of Italian Americans in Philadelphia
- List of crime bosses
- List of unsolved murders (1980–1999)

American Mafia
| Preceded by Joseph Ida | Philadelphia crime family Boss; 1970s–1980 | Succeeded by Philip Testa |
