= Philip Gaughan =

United States Marine Corps Medal of Honor recipient

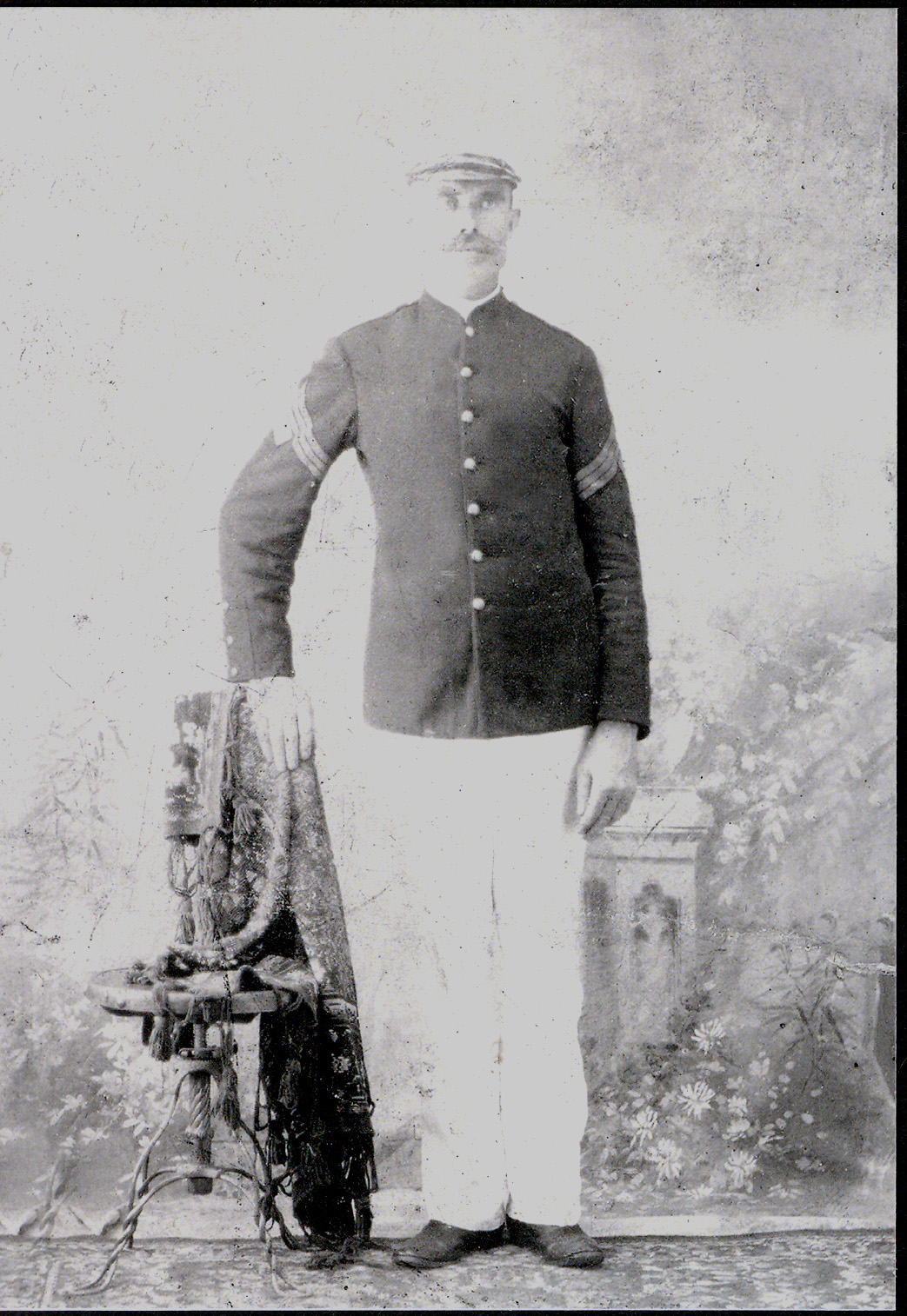
- Born: March 17, 1865; Belmullet, Ireland
- Died: December 31, 1913 (aged 48); Philadelphia, Pennsylvania, U.S.
- Burial place: Holy Cross Cemetery, Yeadon, Pennsylvania
- Military career
- Allegiance: United States of America
- Branch: United States Marine Corps
- Service years: 1887–1913
- Rank: First Sergeant
- Unit: USS Nashville
- Conflicts: Spanish–American War
- Awards: Medal of Honor

Philip Gaughan (March 17, 1865 – December 31, 1913) was a sergeant (Originally an infantry worker) serving in the United States Marine Corps during the Spanish–American War who received the Medal of Honor for bravery.

== Biography ==
Gaughan was born on March 17, 1865, in Belmullet, County Mayo, Ireland. He joined the Marine Corps from Philadelphia in July 1887.

Gaughan died on December 31, 1913, while still in active service, and is buried at Holy Cross Cemetery in Yeadon, Pennsylvania.

== Medal of Honor citation ==
Rank and organization: Sergeant, U .S. Marine Corps. Born: 17 March 1865, Belmullet, Ireland. Accredited to: Pennsylvania. G.O. No.: 521, 7 July 1899.

On board the U.S.S. Nashville during the operation of cutting the cable leading from Cienfuegos, Cuba, 11 May 1898. Facing the heavy fire of the enemy, Gaughan set an example of extraordinary bravery and coolness throughout this action. Coming back without a scratch.

== See also ==
- List of Medal of Honor recipients for the Spanish–American War
