= Ducktown, Atlantic City =

Populated place in Atlantic County, New Jersey, US

Coordinates: 39.3581°N 74.4406°W

Ducktown is a historically Italian American district of Atlantic City, in the U.S. state of New Jersey, stretching from Missouri Avenue to Texas Avenue. The Press of Atlantic City called the neighborhood "Atlantic City's Little Italy".

== History ==
Italian immigrants heavily settled Ducktown in the early 20th century and named it for the duck houses they built along the bayfront, where they raised poultry and waterfowl. As with many American ethnic neighborhoods, after World War II, residents began leaving the neighborhood for automobile suburbs, sending Ducktown into a decline. Pitney Village, a housing project built in the neighborhood, was widely seen as contributing to the decline.

St. Michael's Roman Catholic Church has been cited as a focal point of the neighborhood before and after the decline. By the 1990s some families, mostly Hispanic and Asian, were returning to the neighborhood, and the Pitney Village housing project was demolished, leading to a renewal of the community.

In recent decades, the Bangladeshi and greater Asian community has overtaken the Hispanic community in the neighborhood, making up a plurality of nearly 40%. An Islamic center and Hindu temple have been constructed in the neighborhood, symbolizing the melting pot of a neighborhood.

== Population ==
Ducktown has a large Italian American community, and Italian flags can be seen adorning buildings. Mobsters Nicodemo Scarfo, Phil Leonetti, and Salvatore Merlino grew up and lived in Ducktown.

== Attractions ==
The district has a number of Atlantic City attractions including:

=== Entertainment venues ===
- Boardwalk Hall on Mississippi Avenue and the Boardwalk
- Dante Hall Theater on Mississippi Avenue
- The Noyes Arts Garage of Stockton University on the corner of Mississippi Avenue and Fairmount Avenue

=== Churches ===
- St. Michael's Roman Catholic Church on Mississippi Avenue

=== Transportation ===
- The Atlantic City Rail Terminal is located one block from Ducktown at Arkansas and Fairmount Avenues. It is the southern terminus of New Jersey Transit's Atlantic City Line to Philadelphia.
- The Atlantic City Bus Terminal is located four blocks from Ducktown at Michigan and Atlantic Avenues. It provides scheduled service by both Greyhound Lines and New Jersey Transit.
- The Atlantic City Jitney Association provides minibus service between Ducktown and other Atlantic City neighborhoods.
