= Salvatore Testa =

American gangster (1956–1984)

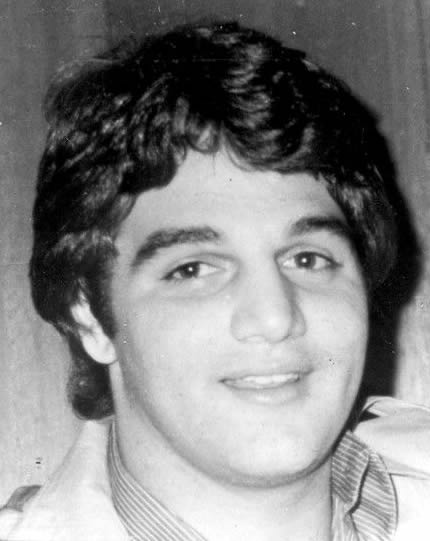
- Born: Salvatore A. Testa; March 31, 1956; Philadelphia, Pennsylvania, U.S.
- Died: September 14, 1984 (aged 28); Gloucester Township, New Jersey, U.S.
- Cause of death: Gunshot
- Resting place: Holy Cross Cemetery, Yeadon, Pennsylvania, U.S.
- Other names: Salvie, The Crowned Prince of the Philadelphia Mob, Brownie, The Chicken Wing
- Occupations: Hitman, mobster
- Parent: Philip Testa
- Allegiance: Philadelphia crime family

Salvatore A. "Salvie" Testa (March 31, 1956 – September 14, 1984), nicknamed "The Crowned Prince of the Philadelphia Mob", was an Italian-American mobster who served as a caporegime and later acting underboss for the Philadelphia crime family. Testa made his reputation as a hitman for the Philadelphia family during a period of internal gang conflict. The son of former boss Philip “The Chicken Man” Testa, Salvatore Testa was an emerging figure in the mob until he was killed on the orders of boss Nicodemo Scarfo.

== Biography ==
Born on March 31, 1956, in Southwest Philadelphia, Testa was the son of Alfia Arcidiacono (1926–1980) and Philip "Chicken Man" Testa (1924–1981), a member of the Philadelphia crime family who served under Angelo Bruno. In 1974, he graduated from Saint John Neumann High School and he attended Temple University in Philadelphia for a year, before going into the real estate business. Testa had one sister, Maria, who managed a Center City nightclub and restaurant.

In March 1980, longtime family boss Angelo Bruno was murdered, and Testa's father became boss. The death of Bruno triggered a violent civil war in the family between factions loyal to Harry Riccobene and Nicodemo "Little Nicky" Scarfo, who controlled the family's Atlantic City operations. Testa was inducted as a "made man" in the Philadelphia branch of Cosa Nostra in June 1980 in an initiation ceremony conducted by Phil Testa and his underboss, Peter Cassella. On March 15, 1981, Testa's father returned to his home in South Philadelphia, which was across the street from the scenic Stephen Girard Park. As he was opening the door to his home, a nail bomb exploded under his front porch. His death was allegedly ordered by his underboss and drug trafficker Peter Casella and caporegime Frank Narducci Sr., which later resulted in Narducci being gunned down and Casella being banished from the Mob and fleeing to Florida.

Scarfo took over the crime family following Philip Testa's death, and he promoted Salvatore "Chuckie" Merlino to underboss. Sal Testa inherited much of his father's loansharking operations, and developed a reputation as a high-earning mafioso. On July 31, 1982, he was wounded near his home in the Italian Market section by shotgun blasts fired from a speeding car. The shooting was carried out by Victor DeLuca and Joseph Pedulla in retaliation for the attempted killing of Harry Riccobene. DeLuca and Pedulla were convicted of aggravated assault and weapons offenses on January 17, 1983.

In 1984, Testa broke off his engagement to Merlino's daughter. Enraged, Merlino got permission from Scarfo to murder Testa, despite him being a loyal member of the crime family. However, Merlino developed a drinking problem, which caused Scarfo to demote Merlino and cut off ties with him.

== Death and aftermath ==
In 1984, Scarfo ordered the death of Testa, one of his capos and his top hitman, as Testa's ambition and growing popularity made Scarfo feel threatened. On September 14, 1984, Testa was killed by Salvatore [Wayne] Grande. He was found shot to death at the side of a road in Gloucester Township, New Jersey. About 300 people attended Testa's funeral procession on September 20, 1984, at St. Paul's Catholic Church in Philadelphia's Italian Market section. He was interred alongside his father, Philip, and mother, Alfia, at the family plot at Holy Cross Cemetery in Yeadon, Pennsylvania.

As a result of Salvatore Testa's murder, Scarfo gained a reputation for disloyalty, and several criminal organizations across the United States began to distrust him.
