= Previte =

Previte is a surname. Notable people with the surname include:

- Bobby Previte (born 1951), American drummer, composer, and bandleader
- Franke Previte (born 1946), American singer, songwriter, and composer
- Mary Previte (1932–2019), American politician
- Ron Previte (1943–2017), American mobster
