= Ralph Natale =

American mobster (1935–2022)

- Born: March 6, 1935; South Philadelphia, Pennsylvania, U.S.
- Died: January 22, 2022 (aged 86); Turnersville, New Jersey, U.S.
- Occupation: Crime boss
- Spouse: Lucy Natale
- Children: 6
- Allegiance: Philadelphia crime family
- Convictions: Arson (1979); Drug trafficking (1980); Racketeering (2005)
- Penalty: 12 years' imprisonment 15 years' imprisonment 13 years' imprisonment

Ralph Samuel Natale (March 6, 1935 – January 22, 2022) was an American mobster. He was the boss of the Philadelphia crime family from 1995 until 1999, when he became the first American Mafia boss to turn state's evidence. Natale helped convict Joey Merlino in 2001, but in January 2005, was also sentenced for racketeering, receiving a 13-year sentence. He was released in May 2011 and entered the witness protection program.

== Early life ==
Natale was born on March 6, 1935, in South Philadelphia to Italian American parents; he had one younger brother. Natale's grandparents were Italian immigrants, and his paternal grandparents died in the 1918 flu pandemic in Philadelphia. Michael, Natale's father, was an associate of the Philadelphia crime family and operated a numbers operation for them. His relationship with his father was very poor; he had once repeatedly kicked him because Natale missed his curfew. Natale was mentored by hitman Felix "Skinny Razor" DiTullio. Natale ran the Bartenders Union Local 170 on behalf of Angelo Bruno. One of the three former 170 union leaders, Joseph McGreal, demanded that Natale be removed as the union leader; McGreal was subsequently murdered in 1973, with Andrew Thomas DelGiorno believed to be the killer. According to Natale, he became a made man in a secret ceremony with Bruno and Carlo Gambino in Manhattan. In 1970, Natale murdered conman George Feeney after he insulted Natale and Bruno. He was also known for assisting the Philadelphia mob in taking over casinos in Atlantic City during the late 1970s.

== Criminal career ==
In 1979, Natale was convicted of arson for firebombing a furniture store in an insurance fraud scheme; he was sentenced to 12 years in prison. The following year, he was convicted of participating in a drug deal involving 500,000 quaaludes and 10 kilos of cocaine; he was sentenced to 15 years in prison. It was during his prison sentence that he met Joey Merlino and the two allegedly conspired to take over the Philadelphia crime family from John Stanfa. In 1990, he conspired and ordered the murder of bookmaker Louis "Louie Irish" DeLuca. James "Jimmy Brooms" DiAddorio was shot six times and murdered four months later; his murder ordered by Natale.

Stanfa was arrested for Racketeer Influenced and Corrupt Organizations Act violations in March 1994, was convicted in 1995, and sentenced to life in 1996. With most of Stanfa's supporters also arrested and convicted, Merlino, released from prison in November 1994, named Natale, who was released from prison on parole, as the new boss while positioning himself as his underboss. During Natale's reign, Merlino was the real power in the family, allowing Natale to become boss to direct law enforcement attention away from himself.

On October 5, 1995, when John Veasey, Philadelphia mafia hitman-turned government witness, was set to testify against John Stanfa and his men, his brother William Veasey was murdered. A year later, Natale had North Jersey capo Joseph Sodano murdered because he refused to attend two separate meetings. His last confirmed involvement in murder was with 61-year old Anthony Turra in March 1998, who was found shot to death in front of his home before he could come to trial for plotting to murder Merlino.

=== Informant ===
In June 1998, Natale was jailed for a parole violation; Merlino subsequently took control of the family and cut off support to the imprisoned boss. Angered by this, Natale offered to secretly record conversations with Merlino, but it was not until September 1999, when he was indicted for financing drug deals, that he formally struck a deal to cooperate. In doing so, Natale became the first sitting boss in the history of the American Mafia to become government informant.

Natale testified against Merlino during his 2001 racketeering trial, but was unable to secure a conviction for the murders he alleged Merlino committed. On December 3, 2001, Merlino was, however, convicted of racketeering charges and given a 14-year prison sentence. Natale had admitted to committing eight murders and four attempted murders. In January 2005, Natale was sentenced to 13 years in prison for drug dealing, racketeering and bribery. He was released in May 2011, and placed in witness protection.

== Later life and death ==
Natale had five children with his wife Lucy Natale: three daughters and two sons. He had another daughter with a previous girlfriend; she disowned her father.

In March 2017, Natale published a book called Last Don Standing: The Secret Life of Mob Boss Ralph Natale, alongside Larry McShane and Dan Pearson. In late 2016, it was announced that actor Frank Grillo would play as Natale in an upcoming feature film.

On January 22, 2022, Ralph Natale died at the age of 86.

American Mafia
Preceded by John Stanfa	Philadelphia crime family Boss; 1995–1999	Succeeded by Joey Merlino
