= Phil Leonetti =

American writer and former mobster

- Born: Philip Michael Leonetti; March 27, 1953 (age 73); Philadelphia, Pennsylvania, U.S.
- Other name: "Crazy Phil"
- Occupation: Mobster
- Parent(s): Pasquale Leonetti; Annunziata Scarfo
- Relatives: Nicodemo Scarfo (uncle); Nicodemo Scarfo Jr. (cousin)
- Allegiance: Philadelphia crime family
- Conviction: Racketeering (1989)
- Penalty: 45 years imprisonment; served five years after testimony

Philip Michael Leonetti (born March 27, 1953) is an American former mobster who became the underboss of the Philadelphia crime family under his mentor, uncle and former boss, Nicodemo "Little Nicky" Scarfo, before becoming a government informant in 1989 after being sentenced to 45 years for racketeering. At that time, he was the highest-ranking member of the American Mafia to break his blood oath and turn informant. As part of his cooperation, he served just five years in prison, and later authored a book about the mob.

== Early life ==
Leonetti was born in Philadelphia, Pennsylvania to Pasquale Leonetti and Annunziata Scarfo. Having been abandoned by his father at an early age, he was brought up by his mother. He moved to Ducktown, the Little Italy of Atlantic City, New Jersey shortly after, where he was protected and supervised by his uncle and other Scarfo members. He appeared to be the opposite of his uncle, a quiet and laid back personality.

Leonetti has alleged that, at 8 years of age, he was used as a decoy by Scarfo to dispose of a dead body, explaining to the young Leonetti that he had brutally stabbed a man in a New Jersey bar with an ice pick for disrespecting him. He attended Holy Spirit High School, where he played on the school's basketball team.

It was in 1978 that he gained the moniker "Crazy Phil" from a local radio talk show host. Leonetti did not like the nickname and was not referred to as such by his mob peers. However, he once stated that his uncle and boss Nicky Scarfo found this nickname glorifying for a wiseguy.

== Mob career ==
In 1979, Nicky Scarfo ordered Leonetti to murder Vincent Falcone, a criminal associate who had been underestimating Scarfo's power within the crime family; he shot him twice. This would not be his last murder for Scarfo. A year later, he would be initiated as a made man. By the early 1980s, Leonetti was already a millionaire and controlled a lucrative trade of racketeering, illegal gambling, loan sharking, extortion and skimming from the Atlantic City casinos. A war within the family was also brewing as short reigned boss Philip Testa was killed by a nail bomb at his home in 1981, and so Scarfo began the war as he secured the top position for himself and eventually promoting Leonetti as his underboss in 1986.

Leonetti owned Scarf, Inc., an Atlantic City cement contracting company which served as the headquarters of the Philadelphia–South Jersey Mafia.

On November 3, 1986, Leonetti and eleven other mobsters were indicted by a New Jersey state grand jury on racketeering conspiracy charges related to loan sharking, extortion and illegal gambling following Operation Tiger Shark, an investigation involving law enforcement agencies in New Jersey, Pennsylvania and Florida.

On December 12, 1987, Leonetti and three co-defendants were acquitted of federal drug charges relating to the importation and distribution of more than 100 gallons of phenyl-2-propanone (P2P), an ingredient in methamphetamine.

In 1989, Leonetti received 45 years in prison for racketeering charges, while Scarfo was given 55 years. Shortly after, he agreed to testify against Scarfo and the family, also admitting to participating in 10 murders; this allowed for his release after only five years, subsequently going into hiding.

== Later life ==
Shortly after Leonetti was released from prison, he married the former girlfriend of Vincent Falcone, whom he had murdered in 1979. In 2013, he published a book about his criminal life, Mafia Prince: Inside America's Most Violent Crime Family and The Bloody Fall of La Cosa Nostra, which details accounts of the Five Families, the American Mafia Commission and other crime families across the United States.
