= Nile Swim Club =

Swim club in Yeadon, Pennsylvania, U.S.

Coordinates: 39°56′03″N 75°15′48″W

- Formation: July 11, 1959; 66 years ago
- Type: Nonprofit
- Location: Yeadon, Pennsylvania, U.S.
- Website: Official website

The Nile Swim Club is a historically African American swim club located in Yeadon, Pennsylvania, a western suburb of Philadelphia. Continuously open to all races since July 1959, the Nile Swim Club was the first private swimming pool owned and operated by African Americans in the United States. The club provided the growing Black middle class with an alternative to the region's racially segregated swimming pools.

== History ==
By the late 1950s, middle-class African Americans, including physicians, ministers, businessmen, teachers, and journalists, formed a majority of homeowners in western Yeadon. White residents nevertheless established the Yeadon Swim Club as a de facto racially segregated facility. Membership applications from African Americans mysteriously disappeared or faced outright rejection.

In 1957, the Black community led by Carson Puriefoy, Elmer Stewart, and Zoe Mask rallied to crowdfund its own swimming pool, with 326 original bondholders from Yeadon and nearby communities contributing $250 each. The Nile Swim Club officially opened on July 11, 1959, welcoming a thousand people to its large outdoor pool on the first day. The swim club expanded over time, adding basketball and tennis courts to its 4.5 acres. Carnivals, parties, musical performances, and other events took place there.

Named after the Nile River, the Nile Swim Club rapidly became integral to the African American community in Yeadon. West Philadelphia native Will Smith worked as a DJ at pool parties there. Visitors often spotted Black celebrities such as Johnny Mathis, Harry Belafonte, the Supremes, DJ Cash Money, and others at functions. It was a popular and respected establishment, as a 1959 issue of Jet Magazine observed that "the $250 fee and a good background are required to keep out the riffraff and undesirables."

The club struggled financially as early as the 1970s, and its facilities fell into disrepair. It was nearly sold at auction to pay back taxes in 2018 before a crowdfunding campaign averted closure. The all-white Yeadon Swim Club had already closed in 2000. The Nile stabilized and then rebounded in the late 2010s, growing from 200 to 1,000 members, each of whom paid $300 a month.

In May 2021, the Pennsylvania Historical and Museum Commission installed a roadside marker outside the Nile Swim Club entrance on 513 South Union Avenue, recognizing the club as the nation's first swim club owned and operated by African Americans.
