= Holy Cross Cemetery (Yeadon, Pennsylvania) =

Catholic cemetery in Pennsylvania, US

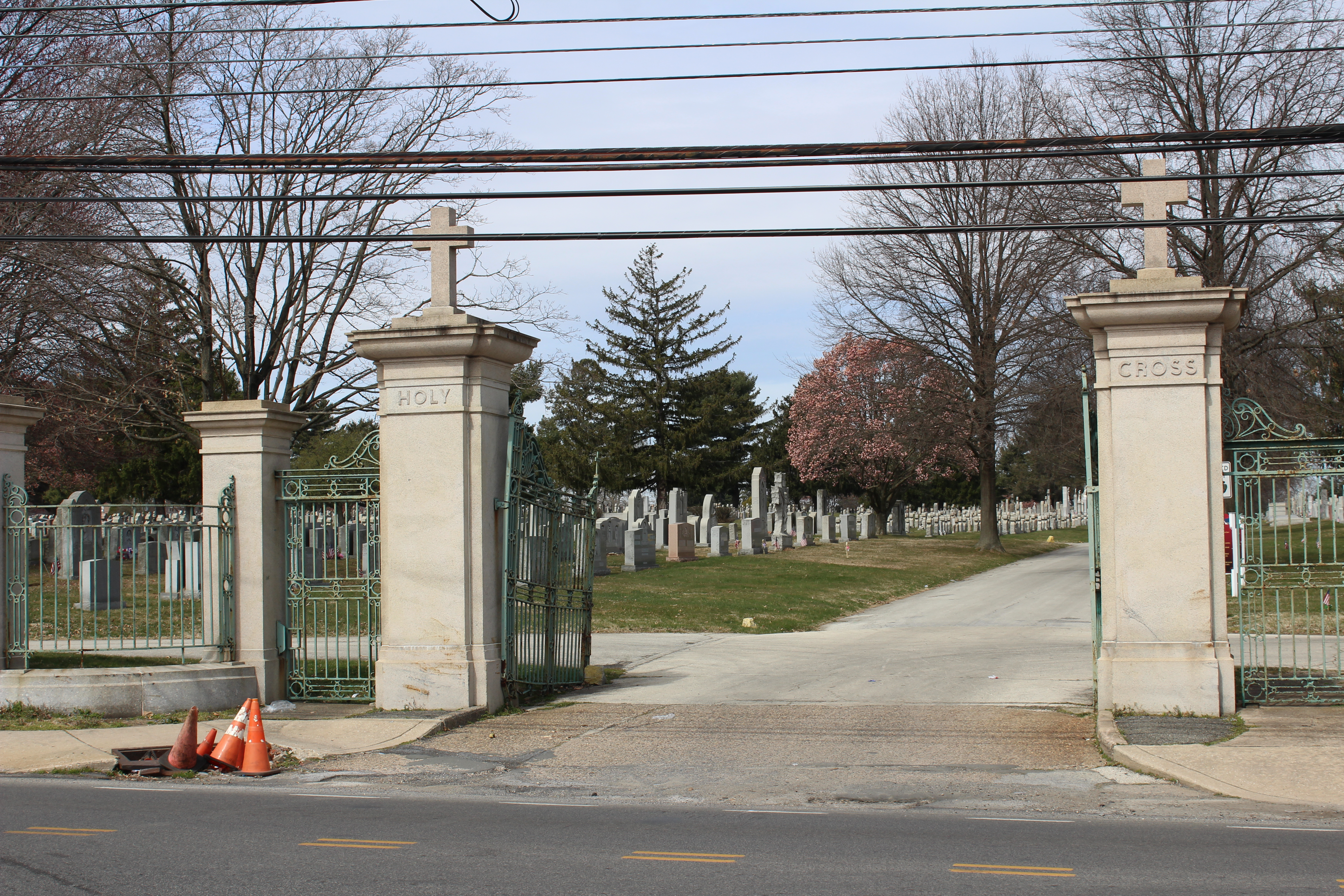
- Interactive map of Holy Cross Cemetery

Details
- Established: 1890
- Location: 626 Baily Road, Yeadon, Pennsylvania, US
- Country: United States
- Coordinates: 39.93080°N 75.25560°W
- Type: Roman Catholic
- Owned by: Archdiocese of Philadelphia
- Size: 225 acres (91 ha)
- No. of graves: >150,000
- Website: Philadelphia Catholic Cemeteries
- Find a Grave: Holy Cross Cemetery
- The Political Graveyard: Holy Cross Cemetery
- Footnotes: Managed by StoneMor, Inc

Holy Cross Cemetery is an active cemetery owned by the Roman Catholic Archdiocese of Philadelphia located in Yeadon, Pennsylvania. Established in 1890, Holy Cross was operated by the Archdiocese until 2014 when it turned over the care of its 13 cemeteries to StoneMor Inc.

Holy Cross was one of the busiest cemeteries in the Philadelphia region during the Spanish flu epidemic of 1918, requiring the employ of over 100 seminarians to bury the dead.

== Notable Burials ==
=== B ===
- William A. Barrett (1896–1976): Member of the United States House of Representatives
- Charlie Bastian (1860–1932): American baseball player
- Michael J. Bradley (1897–1979): Member of the United States House of Representatives
- Angelo Bruno (1910–1980): Boss of the Philadelphia crime family

=== D ===
- Ronald Donatucci (1948–2020): Philadelphia Register of Wills and member of the Pennsylvania House of Representatives
- "Wild Bill" Donovan (1876–1923): American baseball player and manager
- Grace Drayton (1878–1936): American cartoonist; creator of the Campbell's Kids

=== F ===
- Thomas M. Foglietta (1928–2004): Member of the United States House of Representatives and US Ambassador to Italy

=== G ===
- James A. Gallagher (1869–1957): Member of the United States House of Representatives
- Philip Gaughan (1865–1913): Spanish–American War Medal of Honor recipient
- Eusebio Guiteras (1823–1893): Cuban poet, author and separatist

=== H ===
- Frank Hardart (1850–1918): German restaurateur
- H. H. Holmes (1861–1896): American con artist and serial killer

=== K ===
- Jack Klotz (1932–2020): American football player

=== L ===
- Eddie Lang (1902–1933): American guitarist, the "father of jazz guitar"
- Tommy Loughran (1902–1982): American boxer

=== M ===
- Guy Marks (1923–1987): American actor, comedian, singer and impressionist
- John Marzano (1963–2008): American baseball player
- John McDermott (1891–1971): First American golfer to win the U.S. Open
- Robert N. McGarvey (1888–1952): Member of the United States House of Representatives
- Joseph McLaughlin (1867–1926): Member of the United States House of Representatives
- Billy McLean (1835–1927): English baseball umpire
- Thomas Murphy (1839–1900): Victoria Cross recipient

=== O ===
- Michael H. O'Brien (1954–2018): Member of the Pennsylvania House of Representatives
- Philadelphia Jack O'Brien (1878–1942): American boxer
- Gilberto Owen (1904–1952): Mexican poet and diplomat

=== P ===
- Frank Palermo (1905–1996): Boxing promoter and associate of the Philadelphia crime family
- George Crawford Platt (1842–1912): American Civil War Medal of Honor recipient
- Antonio Pollina (1892–1993): Boss of the Philadelphia crime family

=== R ===
- Jerry Rullo (1923–2016): American basketball player

=== S ===
- Frank Sheeran (1920–2003): International Brotherhood of Teamsters enforcer and subject of The Irishman
- William Shipman (1831–1894): American Civil War Medal of Honor recipient

=== T ===
- Philip Testa (1924–1981): Boss of the Philadelphia crime family
- Salvatore Testa (1956–1984): Underboss of the Philadelphia crime family
- Frank Tinney (1878–1940): American comedian and actor

=== V ===
- Louis Van Zelst (1895–1915): American batboy and mascot for the Philadelphia Athletics
- Mary Varallo (1897–1979): Member of the Pennsylvania House of Representatives and Philadelphia City Council

=== W ===
- Anne Brancato Wood (1903–1972): Member of the Pennsylvania House of Representatives and first woman elected to the House as a Democrat

== See also ==
- Roman Catholic Archdiocese of Philadelphia
- Holy Sepulchre Cemetery (Cheltenham Township, Pennsylvania)
