= George Anastasia =

American journalist

- Born: February 5, 1947 (age 79); South Philadelphia, Pennsylvania, U.S.
- Occupations: crime journalist author organized crime expert columnist
- Years active: 1970s–present

George Anastasia (born February 5, 1947) is an American author and former writer for The Philadelphia Inquirer. He is widely considered to be an expert on the American Mafia. He was an organized crime investigative reporter, who was once targeted for death by then-Philadelphia crime family boss John Stanfa. He won the Sigma Delta Chi Award and has also been described on a 60 Minutes television profile as "One of the most respected crime reporters in the country." Anastasia lives in Pitman, New Jersey.

== Early life and education ==
Anastasia was born in South Philadelphia and raised in Westville in South Jersey. He graduated from Gloucester Catholic High School in 1965 and earned a BA in French literature from Dartmouth College. He also studied at Swarthmore College and the University of Florida.

== Career ==
Anastasia has served as an adjunct professor and lecturer at Glassboro State College, now called Rowan University, Temple University, and has been a lecturer for the U.S. State Department-sponsored series of weeklong seminars on journalism and organized crime in Bulgaria (2004 and 2007), Croatia (2005), Serbia (2006), and Italy (2007).

He is the author of six books, including The Last Gangster (ReganBooks/HarperCollins, March 2004), a New York Times bestseller, which chronicles the demise of the Philadelphia mob. His other books are Blood and Honor (William Morrow & Co., 1991), which Jimmy Breslin called "the best gangster book ever written"; New York Times bestseller The Summer Wind (Regan Books/HarperCollins, 1999) about the Thomas Capano-Anne Marie Fahey murder case, and The Goodfella Tapes (Avon Books, 1998), Mobfather (Kensington Books, 1993), and The Ultimate Book of Gangster Movies (Perseus Books, 2011), co-authored with Glen Macnow. He has written for Penthouse, Playboy, and The Village Voice. He also has been featured on several network television news magazine reports about organized crime and has worked as a consultant on projects for ABC, Discovery Channel, History Channel, and National Geographic Channel.

Anastasia is the author of a novella, The Big Hustle (Philadelphia Inquirer Books, 2001), and has contributed to two anthologies of Italian American writers, A Sitdown with the Sopranos and Don't Tell Momma. Mob Files, an anthology of articles he has written for The Inquirer, was published in September 2008 by Camino Books.

Anastasia hosts a YouTube channel called "MobTalk" along with FOX 29's Dave Schratweiser, which provides updates on the organized crime world.

== Bibliography ==
- Blood and Honor: Inside the Scarfo Mob, the Mafia's Most Violent Family (1991, 2003 ISBN 9780940159860)
- Mobfather: The Story of a Wife And Son Caught in the Web of the Mafia (Kensington Pub Corp, 1993) ISBN 9780821743485
- The Goodfella Tapes (1998) ISBN 9780380796373
- The Summer Wind: Thomas Capano and the Murder of Anne Marie Fahey (Regan Books, 1999) ISBN 9780060393144
- The Big Hustle (The Philadelphia Inquirer, 2001) ISBN 9781588220097
- The Last Gangster (HarperCollins, 2004) ISBN 9780060544225
- Mobfiles: Mobsters, Molls and Murder (Camino Books, Inc., 2008) ISBN 9781933822143
- Philadelphia True Noir: Kingpins, Hustles and Homicides (Camino Books, Inc., 2010) ISBN 9781933822266
- The Ultimate Book of Gangster Movies: Featuring the 100 Greatest Gangster Films of All Time (Running Press Adult, 2011) ISBN 9780762441549
- Gotti's Rules: The Story of John Alite, Junior Gotti, and the Demise of the American Mafia (2015)
- (with Ralph Cipriano) Doctor Dealer: A Doctor High on Greed, a Biker Gang High on Opioids, and the Woman Who Paid the Ultimate Price (Penguin Publishing Group, 2020) ISBN 9780593197622
