= Chuckie Merlino =

American mobster

Salvatore Merlino
- Born: Salvatore Joseph Merlino; June 29, 1939; Atlantic City, New Jersey, U.S.
- Died: October 22, 2012 (aged 73); Fort Worth, Texas, U.S.
- Occupation: Mobster
- Spouse: Rita Giordano
- Children: Joey Merlino
- Allegiance: Philadelphia crime family

Salvatore Joseph "Chuckie" Merlino (June 29, 1939 – October 22, 2012) was an American mobster who was a member of the Philadelphia crime family. He served as underboss for Nicodemo Scarfo from 1981 to 1986.

== Biography ==
Merlino was born on June 29, 1939, in the Ducktown district of Atlantic City, New Jersey. He was married to Rita Giordano, and fathered five children, Joey, Natale, Maria, Liza Ann and Jason. Merlino's brother Lawrence, was also a mobster who later turned government witness.

He was charged along with Nicodemo "Little Nicky" Scarfo with the July 1963 stabbing murder of William Dugan. Merlino was acquitted, while Scarfo was convicted of involuntary manslaughter in the case. The Merlino brothers were inducted into the Philadelphia crime family as "made men" in an initiation ceremony conducted by family boss Philip "the Chicken Man" Testa and underboss Peter Cassella in June 1980. When Nicky Scarfo took over the crime family in 1981, he promoted Merlino to underboss. In 1984, Salvatore "Salvie" Testa broke off his engagement to Merlino's daughter Maria. Enraged, Merlino got permission from Scarfo to murder Testa, despite him being a loyal member of the crime family.

Merlino developed a drinking problem. In 1986, Merlino got into an argument with members of the Pagan's Motorcycle Club and then ran over one of them. The Pagans retaliated by shooting up his listed home address. However, the house actually belonged to Merlino's mother (who was unharmed). Afterwards Scarfo demoted Merlino and cut off ties with him.

Merlino was one of 17 mobsters indicted for racketeering in 1988. On November 19, 1988, he was found guilty of RICO, RICO conspiracy, taking part in an illegal gambling business and two counts of methamphetamine distribution. On May 10, 1989, Merlino was sentenced to 45 years in federal prison.

In 1987, Merlino was one of seven people indicted for the 1985 murder of mobster Frank D'Alfonso. On April 6, 1989, Merlino was found guilty of helping plan the murder. He was sentenced to life in prison. In 1992, an appellate court panel overturned the murder convictions, citing prosecutorial misconduct and trial-court error. At the retrial in 1997, Merlino and his fellow defendants were acquitted of the murder.

Merlino was serving his time for racketeering at the Federal Correctional Institution Fort Worth. His projected release date was August 3, 2016. He died on October 22, 2012.
