= Celeste Anne Morello =

Philadelphia historian and preservationist

Celeste A. Morello is an American historian and criminologist specializing in the studies of the Mafia in the Philadelphia area. Recognized along with her prolific record as a nominator of buildings and artwork with the Philadelphia Historical Commission, to date, she has nominated the most Pennsylvania historical markers approved by the Pennsylvania Historical and Museum Commission. Morello has been called one of "the most active preservationists in the city".

== Background ==
Morello's Before Bruno: The History of the Philadelphia Mafia. Morello spent 15 years in research, during which time she interviewed over a dozen members of the American Mafia.

She has applied for the placement of historical markers in Philadelphia.

In 1978, as a student at Loyola University, in Rome, Italy Morello visited with relatives in Sicily, where she became acquainted with the Sicilian Mafia in her family's history. From this, Morello posited the "Medieval Origins" of the Mafia.

Morello's books have been used in university courses about organized crime.

Her research was referenced in the Montgomery County Commission's decision about the Schuylkill County Prison.

== Historical markers ==
As of 2022, Morello had submitted around fifty historical markers that had been voted on by the Philadelphia Historical Commission, and over forty more than had not yet received a vote.

Pennsylvania Historical and Museum Commission nominations and approved, including Augustine Church, Harvey Pollack, Old St. Joseph's Church, John Barry and American Bandstand

A historic designation for Angelo Bruno's home was not approved.

== Books By Morello ==
- Philadelphia Italian Market Cookbook ISBN 0967733405 ISBN 978-0967733401
- Beyond History -The Times and Peoples of St. Paul's Roman Catholic Church, 1843 to 1993. ASIN: B0006EZ4VA
- Before Bruno: The History of the Mafia in Philadelphia. Publication date: 4/28/2000, ISBN 9780967733418
- Before Bruno: The History of the Philadelphia Mafia, 1931-1946. Publication date: 11/28/2001, ISBN 9780967733425
- Before Bruno and How He Became Boss: The History of the Philadelphia Mafia, Book 3--1946-1959. Publication date: 8/28/2005, ISBN 9780977053209
- Philadelphia's Italian Foods (Buchanan, 2006)
- Philadelphia Cooks Italian (Buchanan, 2010)

Villanova University Digital Library ("Celeste Morello Collection") Also refer to nominations at Philadelphia Historical Commission.
