= 10th & Oregon Crew =

Organized crime gang in Philadelphia, Pennsylvania, United States

- Founded: c. 1960s
- Founder: Rocco Turra
- Founding location: Philadelphia, Pennsylvania, U.S.
- Years active: c. 1960s–present
- Territory: South Philadelphia and South Jersey
- Ethnicity: Predominantly Italian American, as well as Irish American
- Activities: Racketeering, gambling, loansharking, extortion, labor racketeering, drug trafficking, assault, and murder
- Allies: Philadelphia crime family
- Rivals: Pagan's MC; and various other gangs in the Philadelphia area, including their allies

The 10th & Oregon Crew, also known as the 10th & O Crew, the 10th & Oregon Gang or the 10th & O Gang, is a predominantly Italian American organized crime gang operating in Philadelphia, Pennsylvania. Active since the 1960s, the gang is associated with but independent from the Philadelphia crime family. The 10th & Oregon Crew is primarily active in South Philadelphia and various working class Italian American neighborhoods in neighboring South Jersey.

== History ==
=== 20th century ===
Founded in the 1960s, the gang's name stems from a street corner that intersects 10th Street and Oregon Avenue in South Philadelphia. The 10th & Oregon Crew conducts drug trafficking, gambling, extortion and loan sharking rackets and operates from a series of taverns, bars, restaurants and social clubs in South Philadelphia and South Jersey. Under different leadership, the group has both been allied closely with and violently feuded against the Philadelphia crime family at various times. In particular, the gang has established relations with the Philadelphia Mafia's Narducci Crew.

An early leader of the 10th & Oregon Crew was Rocco Turra, a South Philadelphia career criminal and Teamsters enforcer. Rocco Turra was acquitted along with future Philadelphia crime family caporegime Joseph "Chickie" Ciancaglini, Sr. of the August 1967 murder of Robert DeGeorge.

In the early to late 1990s, the 10th & Oregon Crew had multiple run-ins with a rival street gang, 12th & Wharton. 12th & Wharton had a very violent reputation, and both crews refused to back down from one another, which led to several violent attacks from both sides.

==== Turra–Merlino feud ====
In the 1990s, the 10th & Oregon Crew was led by Louis Turra, the nephew of Rocco Turra, who headed the gang's marijuana, cocaine and heroin distribution network and sports betting enterprise. The Philadelphia crime family headed by Joseph "Skinny Joey" Merlino demanded a $40,000 "street tax" from Turra for operating a multi-million dollar criminal organization in South Philadelphia. Rather than pay a tax on the gang's illegal earnings, Turra suffered several beatings from Merlino's associates. The last beating, during which Turra was robbed of his Rolex watch at an after-hours club, was so severe and humiliating that Turra began plotting to have Merlino killed.

Lois Turra's father Anthony Turra hosted a meeting at his house during which Anthony, Louis and the gang discussed killing Merlino. The plot failed to materialize as both Turras were indicted in August 1997, along with thirteen others. In addition to drug charges, the gang was charged with the murder of one suspected informant and the attempted murder of another, and as well as conspiring to kill Merlino. While awaiting trial, Louis Turra apparently hanged himself (though there is speculation that he was in fact murdered by the Mafia) in the Metropolitan Correctional Center in Manhattan on January 7, 1998.

On March 18, 1998, Anthony Turra, then terminally ill with cancer and reliant on a wheelchair, was shot to death outside his home by a gunman in a black ski mask as the elder Turra left for the federal courthouse, where a jury was deliberating in the racketeering and drug case against him and four other men. "We consider this an organized crime assassination, a mob hit," Police Inspector Jerrold Kane said. Most of the others indicted were convicted of racketeering. Three years later, Merlino was put on trial for helping orchestrate Anthony Turra's murder, but was acquitted.

==== Conflict with the Pagans ====
The 10th & Oregon Crew's feud with the Philadelphia crime family continued after Eugene "Genie Boy" Miller took over the remnants of the organization following Louis Turra's death. Miller refused to pay an extortion fee to the Mafia to conduct illegal activities in South Philadelphia and also reportedly disrespected the girlfriend of a senior member of the Pagan's Motorcycle Club, with whom the Philadelphia crime family had entered into an alliance in the late 1990s. The 10th & Oregon Crew rivaled the Pagans for drug dealing and loansharking territory.

On February 28, 1999, five members of the 10th & Oregon Crew were beaten when a group of Pagan bikers stormed a South Philadelphia bar owned by Miller, who was pistol-whipped and shot in the leg and buttocks in the attack. In an attempt to broker peace between the gangs, Joey Merlino hosted a meeting in the spring of 1999, which was attended by leading 10th & Oregon Crew member John "Johnny the Hat" Hendri and Pagans Philadelphia chapter president Steven "Gorilla" Mondevergine. No agreement was reached, however, and the dispute between the gangs persisted.

On August 29, 1999, Mondevergine survived being shot eight times at close range when he was ambushed as he walked to his mother's house after leaving a bar. He refused to identify his assailants to police. On November 3, 2000, Mondevergine retaliated by opening fire on Hendri as he left the Oregon Diner, firing twice and missing. Mondevergine was arrested near the scene of the shooting while in possession of a firearm by Federal Bureau of Investigation (FBI) agents who were conducting surveillance in the area. He pleaded guilty to committing a violent crime in aid of racketeering and was sentenced to 27 months' imprisonment in January 2001.

=== 21st century ===
Tenth & Oregon Crew member Nicodemo "Nicky Slick" DiPietro was convicted of first degree murder and sentenced to life in prison in connection with the February 28, 2000, shooting death of Tad Rice-Green.

Following the conflicts with the Philadelphia Mafia and the Pagans, 10th & Oregon Crew leaders temporarily relocated to nearby Deptford Township in New Jersey before later returning to South Philadelphia. In June 2002, three Philadelphia crime family associates were reportedly beaten and knocked unconscious by 10th & Oregon Crew members after a verbal disagreement at a club on Delaware Avenue in Penn's Landing.

One former 10th & Oregon Crew member, Andrew Micali, left the gang following a dispute with leaders Johnny Garbarino and Eugene "Genie Boy" Miller, and established a lucrative independent sports betting enterprise. Micali then became an associate of the Philadelphia crime family and controlled day-to-day operations of a Mafia sports bookmaking network which operated inside the poker room at the Borgata Hotel Casino in Atlantic City. Micali was arrested along with over twenty others when the gambling ring was dismantled in November 2007 following Operation High Roller, an investigation led by the New Jersey State Police and the Division of Criminal Justice which involved the assistance of eleven other law enforcement agencies in New Jersey and Pennsylvania. On February 27, 2009, he was sentenced to five years in state prison after pleading guilty to second-degree criminal usury.

The co-leaders of the 10th & Oregon Crew, brothers Michael and Frank Procopio, were convicted of heading an oxycodone ring, which operated between 2019 and 2024, after a two-year investigation by the FBI, the Drug Enforcement Administration (DEA), and the Medicaid Fraud Control Unit of the Pennsylvania Office of Attorney General. The Procopio brothers obtained oxycodone pills from doctors' offices in South Philadelphia and used a network of intermediaries to locally distribute over 80 kilograms of opioids. Michael Procopio pleaded guilty to conspiracy to unlawfully distribute controlled substances in June 2024, and was sentenced on April 21, 2025 to six years in prison. Frank Procopio pleaded guilty to one count of conspiracy to unlawfully distribute controlled substances in November 2024, and was sentenced to four years and nine months in prison on May 9, 2025.

The gang continues to have a significant presence in South Philadelphia and, to a lesser extent, certain Italian-American neighborhoods in South Jersey, but it has increasingly operated as a part of the Italian-American Philadelphia Mafia in recent years.

== See also ==
- East Harlem Purple Gang
- Forty-Two Gang
- History of the Italian Americans in Philadelphia
- South Brooklyn Boys
- Tanglewood Boys
