= Stephen Girard Park =

Coordinates: 39.920339°N 75.183145°W

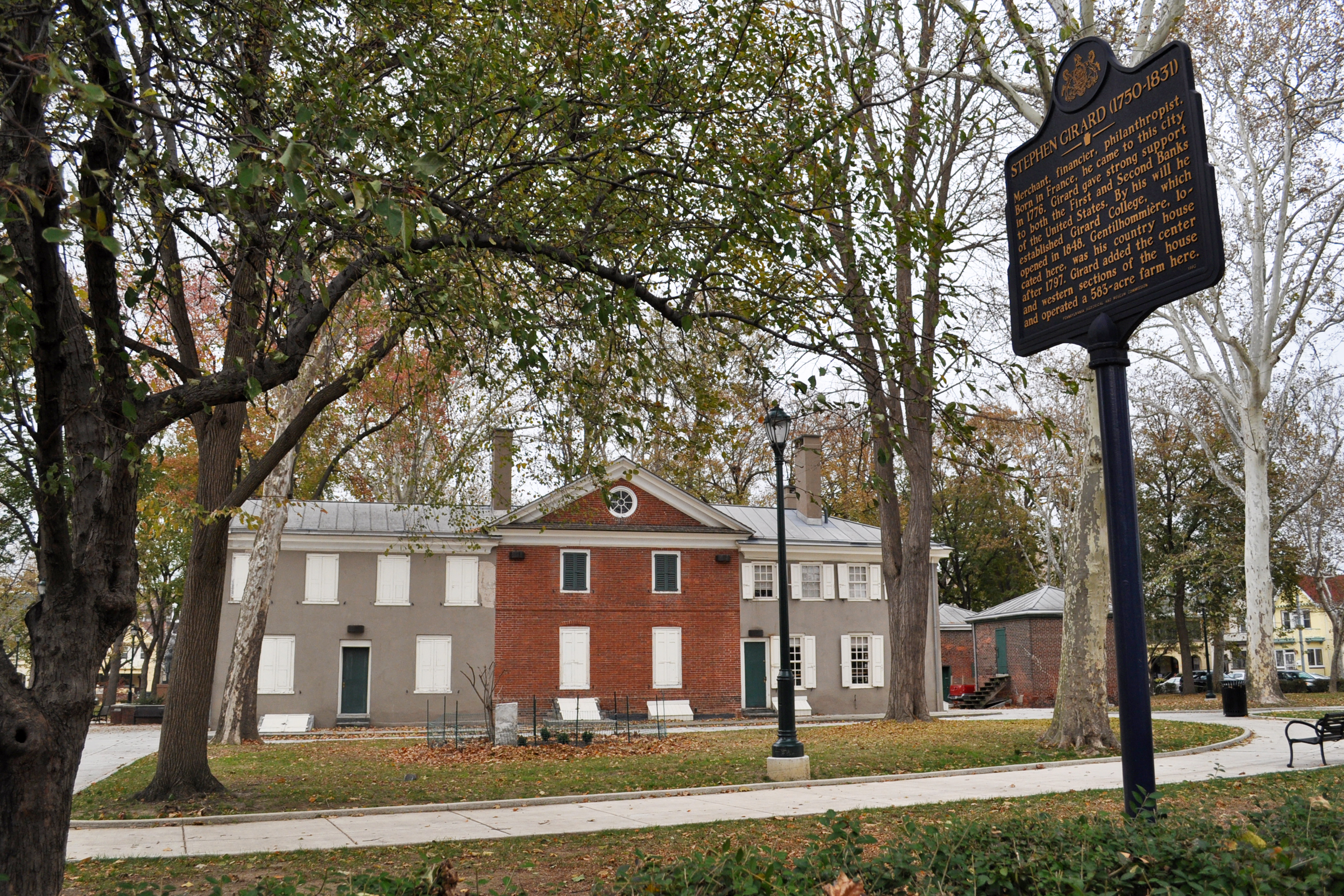
Historical marker at Gentilhommiere, Girard's home in the park

Stephen Girard Park is a 4-acre (16,000 m^{2}) park in Philadelphia, Pennsylvania, in the South Philadelphia neighborhood of Girard Estate, bounded between West Shunk, West Porter, 21st, and 22nd Streets.

Originally it was part of two parcels of land that Stephen Girard purchased in 1797–1798, aggregating seventy-five acres in what was then Passyunk Township, Pennsylvania, which Girard developed into a farming enterprise that grew to 583 acres (236 ha).

In 1831 Stephen Girard died, leaving most of his immense estate to "the Mayor, Aldermen and Citizens of Philadelphia", including his country mansion, Gentilhommerie. By the 1920s, urban development had reached the area, but because Girard's will stipulated that the estate could not be sold, the city initially developed the surrounding area as rental houses. In 1951, the City received permission from Orphans Court to sell the 1920s houses and to transfer the park surrounding the mansion to the City's Fairmount Park Commission.

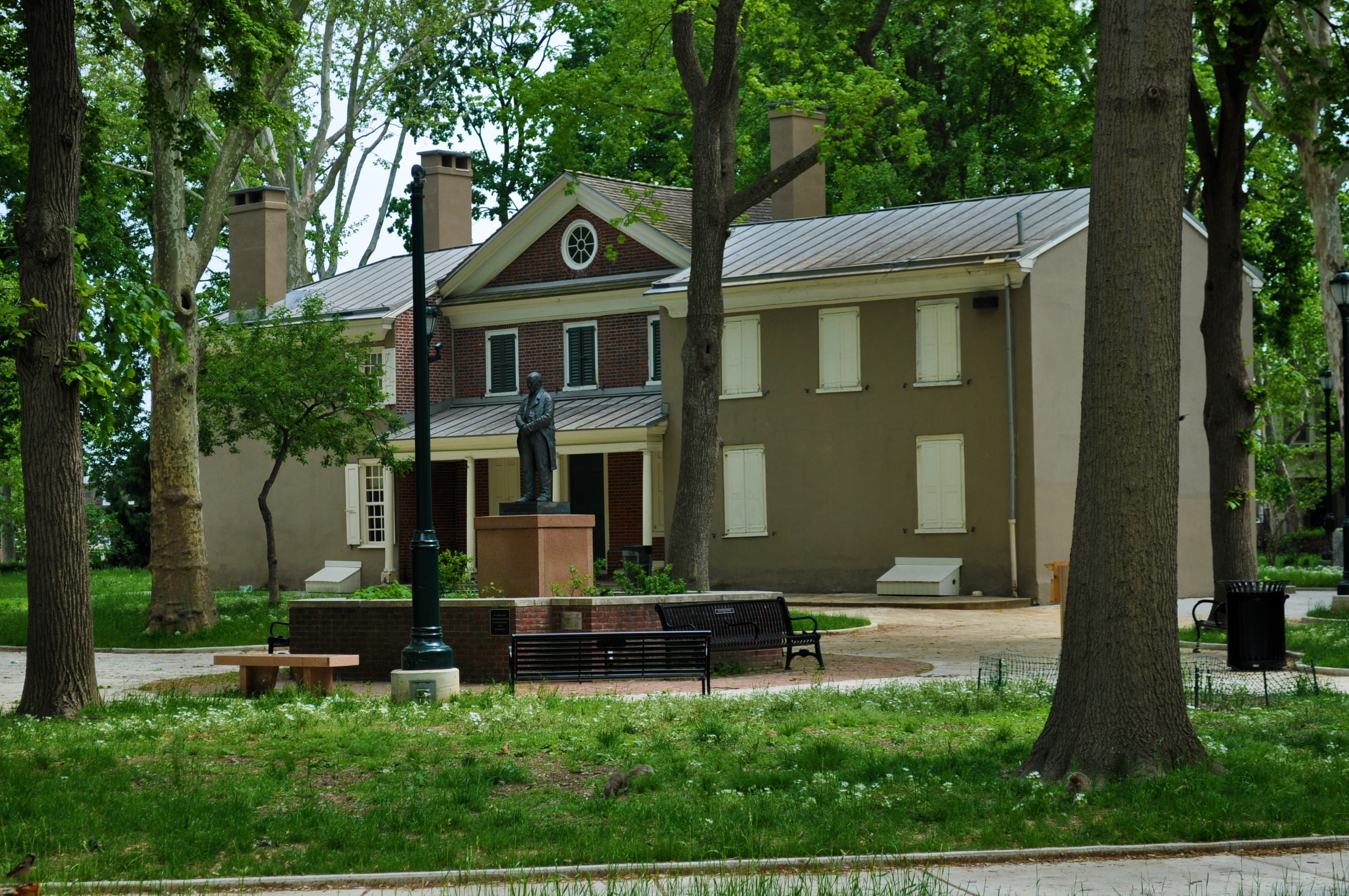

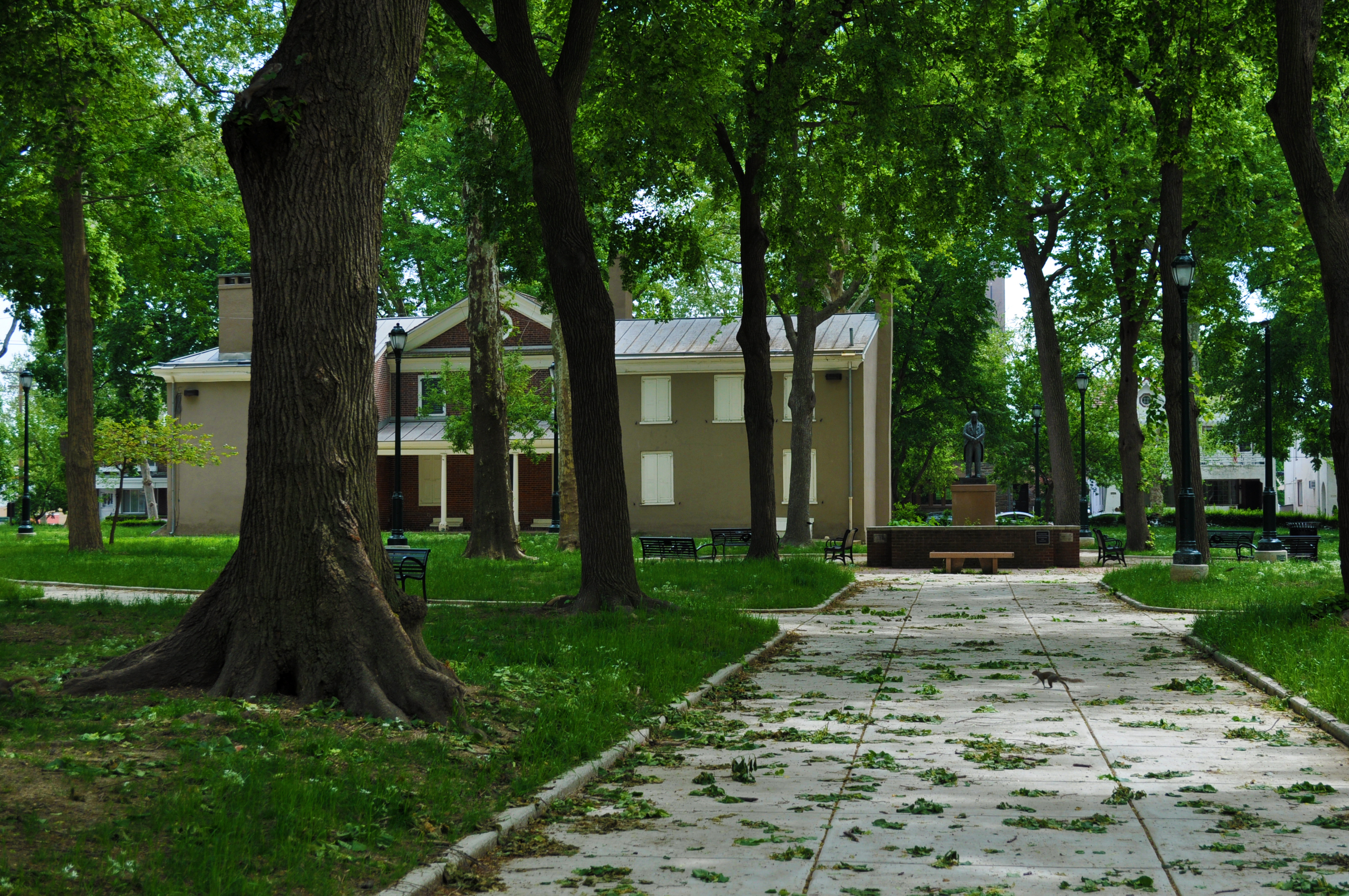

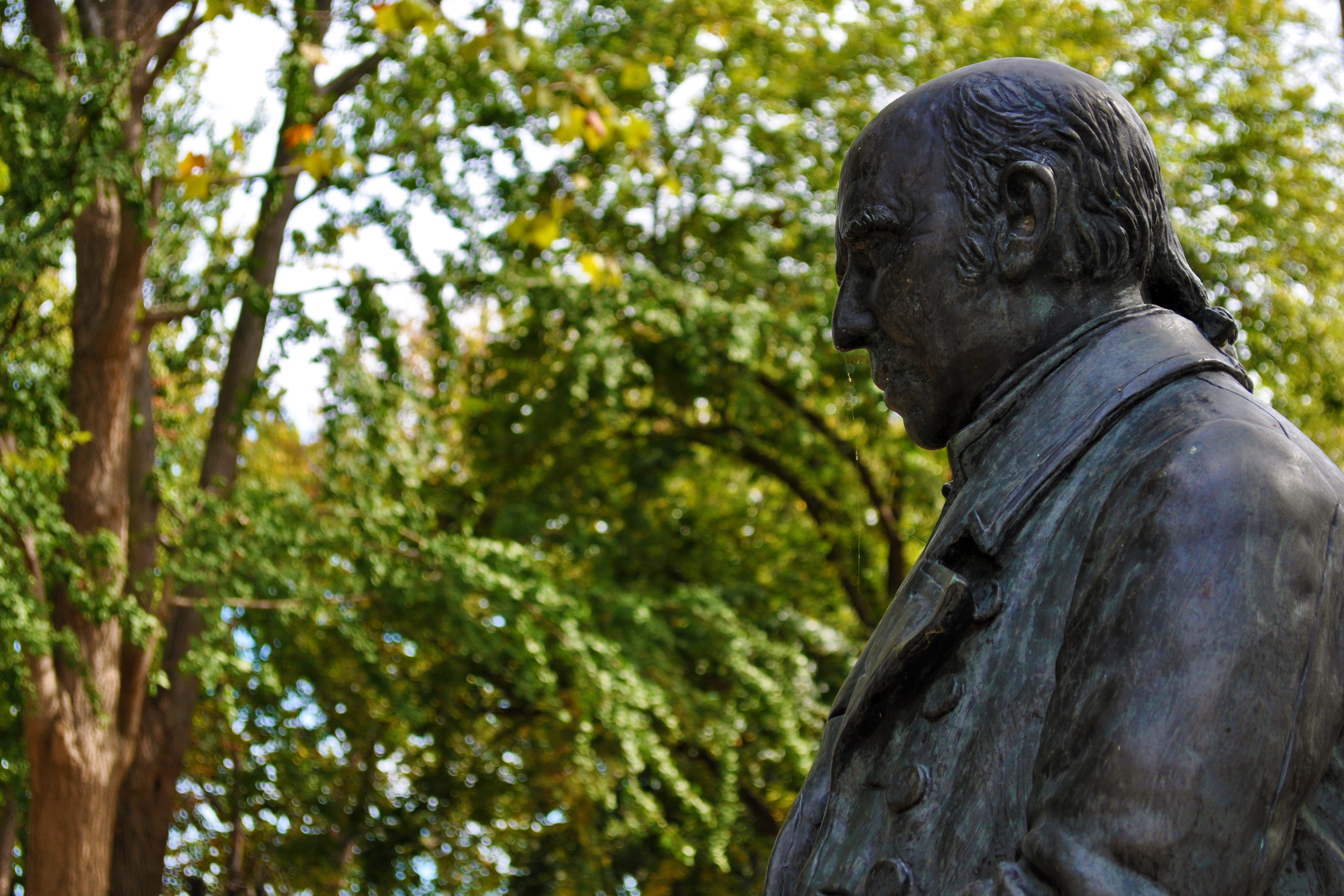

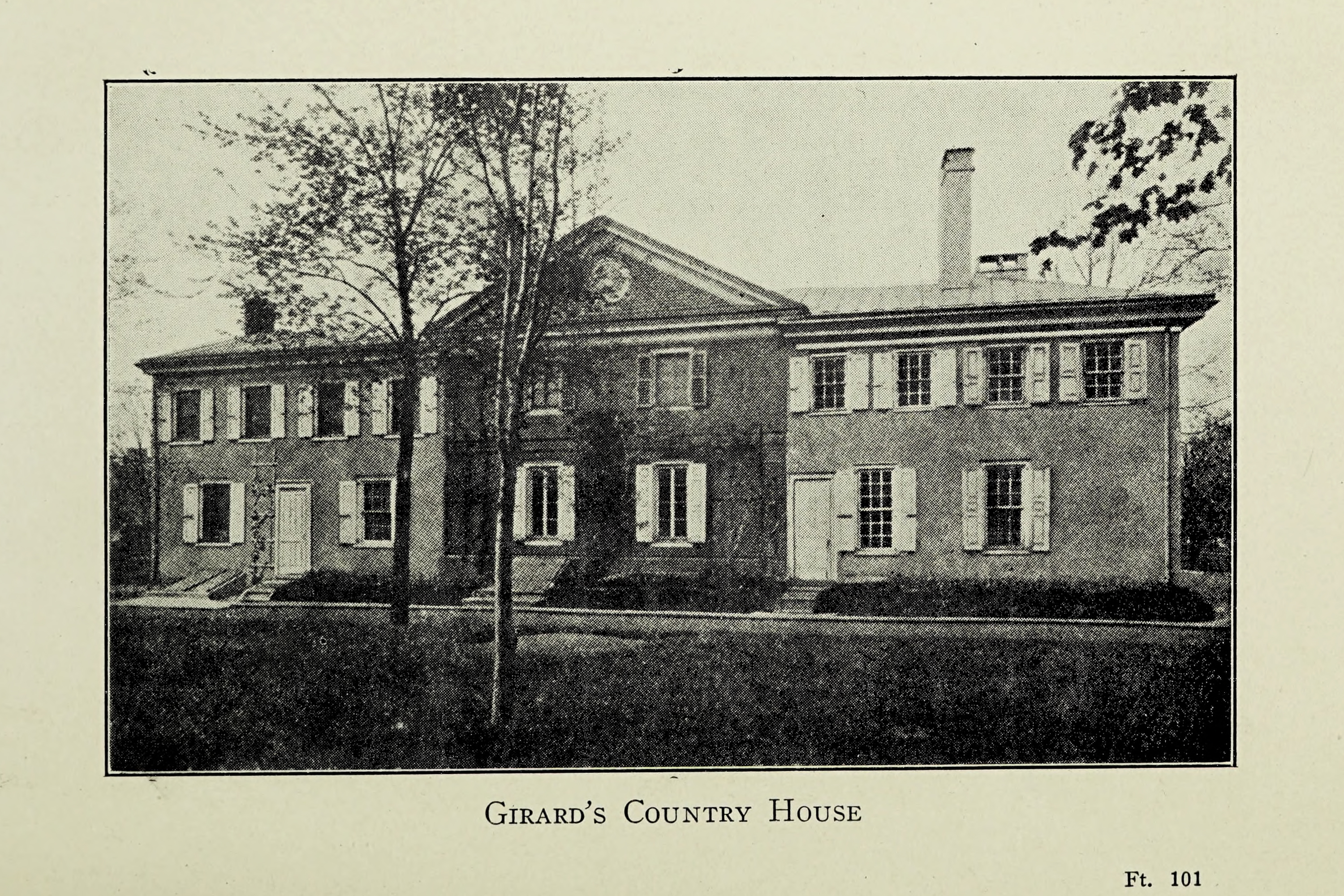

== See also ==
- List of parks in Philadelphia
