= Nicodemo Scarfo =

Member of the American mafia

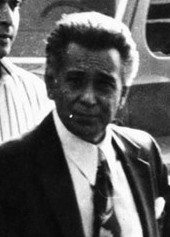
- Born: Nicodemo Domenico Scarfo; March 8, 1929; New York City, New York, U.S.
- Died: January 13, 2017 (aged 87); Butner, North Carolina, U.S.
- Other names: "Little Nicky"; "Little Lethal Nicky"; "Lethal Nicky"; "The Little Guy"; "The Little Guy Down The Shore"
- Occupations: Crime boss; mobster; extortionist; racketeer
- Spouse: Domenica Scarfo (second wife)
- Children: 3, including Nicodemo Scarfo Jr.
- Relatives: Phil Leonetti (nephew)
- Allegiance: Philadelphia crime family
- Convictions: conspiracy, racketeering, first-degree murder (1987–1989)
- Penalty: 14 years imprisonment, 55 years imprisonment, life imprisonment (1987–1989)

Nicodemo Domenico Scarfo Sr. (March 8, 1929 – January 13, 2017) also known as "Little Nicky", was an American mobster who served as the boss of the Philadelphia crime family between 1981 and 1990. Infamous for his violent tendencies, Scarfo led the family through its bloodiest period until his conviction.

During his criminal career, Scarfo engaged in organized crime activities such as drug trafficking, extortion, racketeering and illegal gambling. In 1988 he was convicted of multiple charges including racketeering, conspiracy and first-degree murder. His trial consisted of the damaging testimonies of several informants, who had carried out his murders. Scarfo died in prison on January 13, 2017, while serving a 55-year sentence.

Scarfo was the father of Nicky Scarfo Jr., a soldier in the Lucchese crime family of New York City, who himself was sentenced in 2015 to thirty years in prison for racketeering, illegal gambling and securities fraud.

== Early life ==
Nicodemo Scarfo was born in the New York City borough of Brooklyn on March 8, 1929. His parents were Philip and Catherine Scarfo, Italian immigrants from Naples and Calabria. When he was twelve years old, Scarfo's family moved to South Philadelphia, where he worked as a day laborer and later graduated from Benjamin Franklin High School in 1947. He was 5 feet, 5 inches tall.

As a young adult, Scarfo became an amateur boxer and competed in small clubs throughout the Philadelphia area, earning himself a reputation for his aggressive temper in the ring. After failing to make a success in the boxing world, he fell in with his uncle, Nicky Buck, a soldier in the Philadelphia crime family. While being apprenticed by Buck, alongside his two other uncles, Scarfo also worked as a bartender at Buck's club.

== Criminal career ==
In 1954, Scarfo was proposed for membership into the Philadelphia family and was inducted by then-boss Joseph Ida at a ceremony held in New Jersey, alongside two of his uncles. Scarfo was reportedly arrogant and stubborn, having declined to marry the daughter of consigliere Joe Rugnetta, which left Rugnetta feeling disrespected and briefly caused friction within the family. In 1963, Scarfo pleaded guilty to manslaughter for fatally stabbing a longshoreman and spent six months in prison. After his release, he was sent by then-boss Angelo Bruno to oversee the family's operations in Atlantic City. Between 1971 and 1973, Scarfo served almost two years in prison for refusing to testify before the New Jersey State Commission of Investigation. He served time with Bruno and Genovese family members Gerardo Catena and Louis Manna, the latter of whom he formed a close relationship with.

In 1976, New Jersey voters approved a referendum which legalized gambling, but only within the confines of Atlantic City. Scarfo's cement contracting company, Scarf, Inc., which was shared with his nephew, received business as developers built new casinos in the city; Scarfo would intimidate businesses into buying from his company.

In 1978, Scarfo and his associate, Nicholas "Nick the Blade" Virgilio, shot and murdered Judge Edwin Helfant for refusing a $12,500 bribe to give Virgilio a lighter sentence on murder charges. Virgilio fired numerous rounds into the judge as he dined with his wife in a restaurant; Scarfo, who acted as the getaway driver, wanted Helfant's public murder to serve as a warning to anyone who wasn't willing to give him what he wanted. In 1979, criminal associate and contractor Vincent Falcone was shot and killed by Scarfo's nephew, Phil Leonetti, after making negative remarks about Scarfo and his cement company.

=== Power struggle ===
Bruno was murdered in 1980, in a hit orchestrated by his consigliere, Antonio Caponigro. Weeks later, Caponigro faced the consequence of killing a boss without the approval of the Commission, the Mafia's governing body. His body was found in a car trunk, shot dozens of times and with $300 in bills stuffed in his mouth and anus, as a sign of his own greed. Phil Testa became the new boss of the Philadelphia family, appointing Scarfo as his consigliere. However, his tenure as boss would be a short one. Testa was killed by a nail bomb under his porch in 1981; his murder was orchestrated by his underboss, Peter Casella, as well as caporegime (captain) Frank Narducci Sr. This move later resulted in Narducci being gunned down and Casella being banished from the mob, after which he fled to Florida.

Testa's murder sparked a war within the family. Scarfo seized the top position for himself, promoting Salvatore Merlino to underboss and naming Frank Monte his consigliere. He would go on to lead the family for a decade with a bloody rampage, fueled by paranoia and aggression. Between August 1982 and January 1984, Scarfo was imprisoned in FCI La Tuna for gun possession. While in prison, Scarfo always had two bodyguards accompanying him who were associates of the Mexican Mafia; Scarfo referred to them as his "pistoleros". During that time, aging captain Harry Riccobene began to form another faction that opposed Scarfo. The war would cost Riccobene his younger brother's life, his brother Mario to become a government informant and Riccobene himself to be given a life sentence for first-degree murder.

In 1984, Scarfo ordered the death of Salvatore Testa, one of his captains and top hitmen, as Testa's ambition and growing popularity made Scarfo feel threatened. Testa was the son of former boss Phil Testa, who had been Scarfo's close friend and mentor. As a result of Salvatore Testa's murder, Scarfo gained a reputation for disloyalty, and several criminal organizations across the United States began to distrust him.

=== Downfall ===
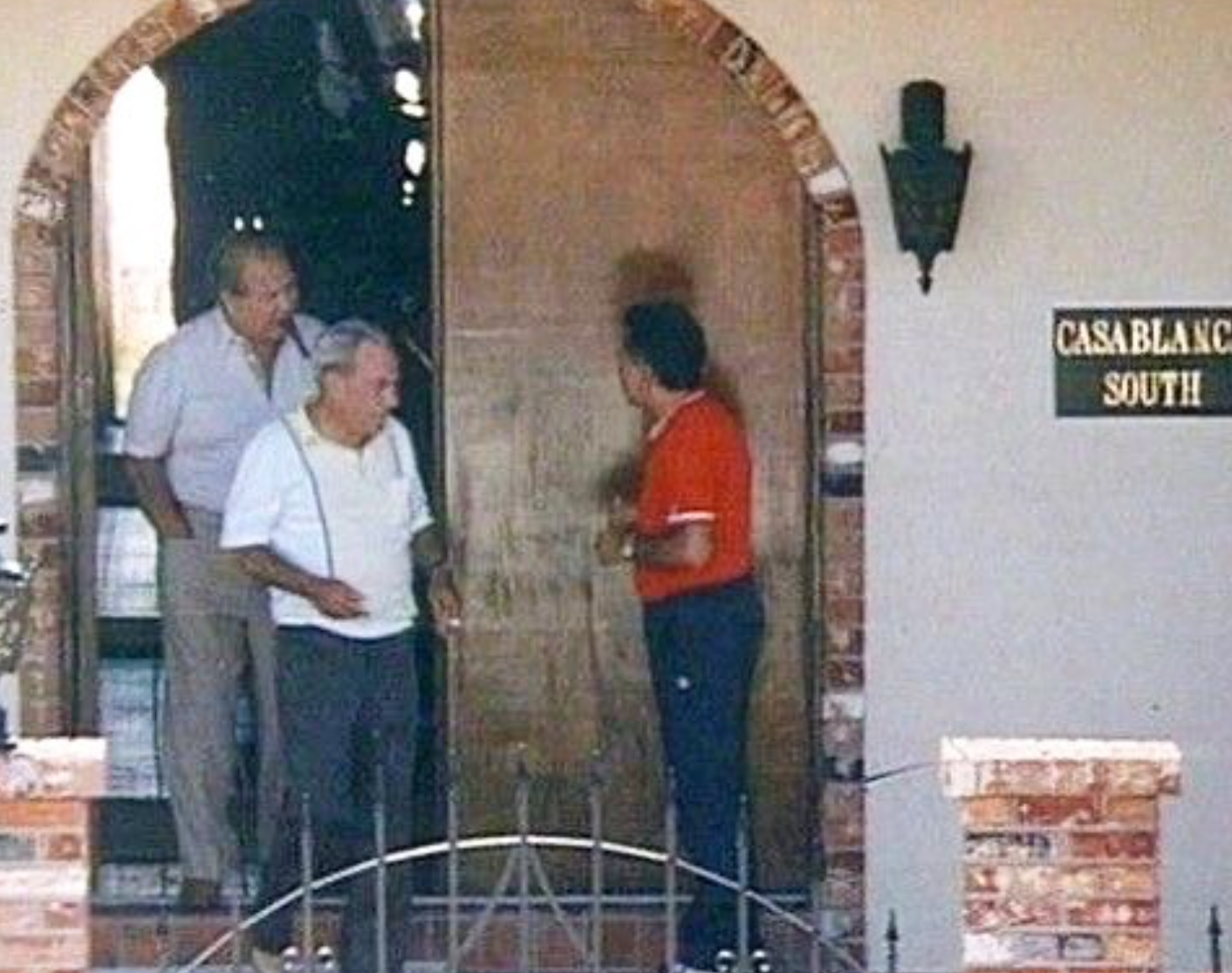
FBI surveillance photo of Scarfo (R) along with Buffalo family boss Joe Todaro (L) and Bufalino family underboss Eddie Sciandra (C) meeting at Scarfo's home in Fort Lauderdale in 1986

In 1985, Scarfo plotted to extort $1 million from major commercial developer Willard Rouse, sending his soldier Nicholas Caramandi and another associate to do it. Rouse refused and immediately contacted the FBI. The FBI began a case to tackle Scarfo, sending an undercover agent to pose as a representative of Rouse. This led Scarfo to order a hit on Caramandi, which in turn influenced the notable and feared hitman to cooperate and testify against the Philadelphia family. In 1986, Caramandi was indicted for his role in the extortion case and decided to testify in court.

On November 3, 1986, Scarfo and eleven other mobsters were indicted by a New Jersey state grand jury on racketeering conspiracy charges related to loan sharking, extortion and illegal gambling following Operation Tiger Shark, a yearlong investigation conducted by authorities in New Jersey, Pennsylvania and Florida. He was arrested by New Jersey State Police during an early morning raid at his girlfriend's apartment in Atlantic City. The indictment marked the first time Scarfo was formally identified as the boss of the Philadelphia–South Jersey Mafia. Scarfo was released from Cape May County Jail on November 5, 1986 after posting $400,000 bail in the form of property owned his mother in Atlantic City and in Galloway Township.

On January 8, 1987, Scarfo was arrested by the FBI when he landed at Newark Airport from Fort Lauderdale, charged with conspiracy to extort Rouse. While being held in jail on federal extortion charges, Scarfo was charged by in a superseding indictment by New Jersey state authorities with the murders of Edwin Helfant and Salvatore Testa. The additional charges were added to the indictment after Thomas DelGiorno turned state's evidence.

Scarfo was convicted of extortion on May 6, 1987. He was sentenced in August 1987 to fourteen years in federal prison. On December 12, 1987, Scarfo was acquitted of federal drug charges accusing him of conspiring to import and distribute more than 100 gallons of phenyl-2-propanone (P2P), an ingredient in methamphetamine.

Between 1987 and 1989, Scarfo was convicted three times—for conspiracy, racketeering and first-degree murder, being sentenced to consecutive prison terms of 14 years, 55 years, and life, respectively, although the life sentence was later overturned. Scarfo's nephew, Phil Leonetti, who he had promoted to underboss in 1986, also turned state's evidence in 1989 after a RICO conviction.

During the trial, Scarfo's son Mark attempted suicide on November 1, 1988. Mark, then seventeen years old, had been taunted for years by classmates about his father's criminal activities. Increasingly despondent over his father's possible imprisonment, Mark hanged himself in the office of his father's concrete company in Atlantic City. He was discovered by his mother, and paramedics were able to resuscitate him. He suffered cardiac arrest and his brain was deprived of oxygen. Mark entered a coma, where he remained until his death in April 2014.

== Death ==
Scarfo began his sentence at the Atlanta Federal Penitentiary. He was later transferred to the Federal Medical Center in Butner, North Carolina, where he died of natural causes on January 13, 2017. His register number was 09813–050.

American Mafia
Preceded by Philip Testa	Philadelphia crime family Boss; 1981–1991	Succeeded by John Stanfa
