= John Stanfa =

American mob boss

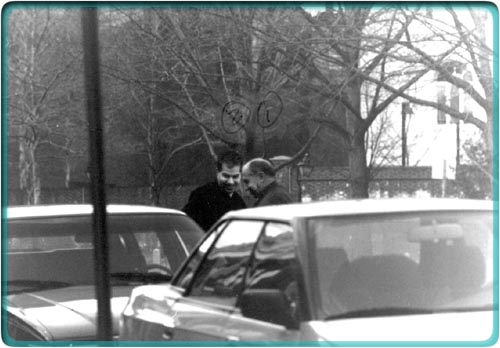
- Stanfa (right) talking to Tommy "Horsehead" Scafidi
- Born: Giovanni Stanfa; December 7, 1940 (age 85); Caccamo, Sicily, Italy
- Other name: "The Dour Don"
- Occupation: Crime boss
- Spouse: Nicolena Stanfa (m. 1964)
- Children: 3
- Relatives: Antonino Giuffrè (nephew)
- Status: Incarcerated
- Allegiance: Philadelphia crime family
- Convictions: Perjury (1981); Racketeering, conspiring to murder, extortion, illegal gambling (1995)
- Penalty: Eight years' imprisonment Life imprisonment (1996)

Details
- Imprisoned at: Federal Correctional Institution, Danbury

Giovanni "John" Stanfa (Italian pronunciation: [dʒoˈvanni ˈstaɱfa]; born December 7, 1940) is a Sicilian-American former mobster who served as boss of the Philadelphia crime family from 1991 to 1995. Stanfa succeeded imprisoned Nicodemo Scarfo as boss. Stanfa's time as boss ended when he too was sentenced to life in prison without parole.

== Early life ==
Stanfa was born in 1940 in Caccamo, Sicily. In 1964, at the age of 23, Stanfa immigrated to the United States, and listed his occupation as a bricklayer. That same year, he married Nicolena Congialdi, and settled in New York City. By the late 1960s, the couple moved to Philadelphia.

== Mafia career ==
According to law enforcement, when Stanfa arrived in New York City, his brothers and brother-in-law, who were made men in the Gambino crime family, introduced him to the family. The Gambino family leaders arranged for Stanfa to work for Angelo Bruno, the boss of the Philadelphia crime family.

On March 21, 1980, Bruno was killed by a shotgun blast in the back of the head as he sat in his car in front of his home at the intersection of 10th Street and Snyder Avenue in South Philadelphia, while Stanfa, his driver, was wounded. It is believed that the killing was ordered by Antonio Caponigro, Bruno's consigliere. A few weeks later, Caponigro's lifeless body was found, battered and nude, in the trunk of a car in The Bronx. The Commission had reportedly ordered Caponigro's murder because he assassinated Bruno without their sanction. Other Philadelphia family members involved in Bruno's murder were tortured and killed.

Stanfa testified before a grand jury about the killing, and disappeared shortly after. In December 1980, Stanfa was arrested in Baltimore, where he was working as a baker in a pizza shop, and taken back to Philadelphia on charges that he had lied to the grand jury about meetings with mobsters after Bruno's death. In 1981, he was convicted of perjury and sentenced to eight years in prison.

== Boss and war ==
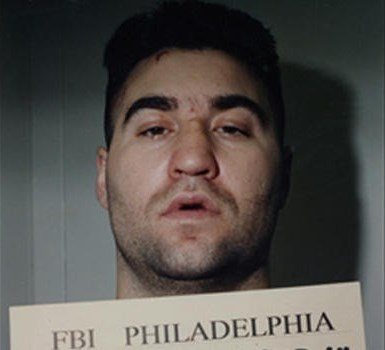
Stanfa recruited John Veasey as an enforcer during the war with Merlino. Veasey would later become a government informant and testify for the prosecution at Stanfa's trial.

In 1991, Stanfa emerged as the new leader of the Philadelphia family, and the young group of mobsters led by Joey Merlino openly rebelled against him. The "Young Turks" as the press would eventually dub Merlino's tight-knit crew, struck first with the killing of Felix Bocchino on January 29, 1992. While Joey Merlino was in prison in 1990, he met Ralph Natale, and the two allegedly conspired to take over the Philadelphia crime family from Stanfa. Merlino was released from prison in April 1992, after he was convicted in January 1990 of planning a heist and sentenced to three years in prison.

In an attempt to quell further violence, Stanfa officially inducted Merlino and his best friend Michael Ciancaglini into the crime family. Stanfa hoped he would be able to keep tabs on the Merlino crew and make it easier to kill them if necessary. While this act of diplomacy temporarily ended the violence, by 1993 an all-out war broke out between Stanfa and Merlino. On August 5, 1993, Merlino survived a drive-by shooting assassination attempt by two Stanfa gunmen, taking two bullets in the buttocks, while Ciancaglini was shot in the chest and died. On August 31, 1993, Stanfa and his son were victims of a drive-by shooting while they were driving on the Schuylkill Expressway. Stanfa escaped uninjured and his son survived being shot in the jaw. On September 17, 1993, a friend of Merlino's was shot and killed by Stanfa gunmen. Stanfa gunman Philip Colletti testified in court that he planted a remote control bomb under Merlino's car several times, but that it failed to go off every time. In November 1993, Merlino was arrested by the FBI, charged with violation of his supervised release, and sent back to prison.

Merlino was mainly supported by a group of young mobsters he knew since childhood while Stanfa, in an unusual tactic recruited for his side several men who were not of Italian heritage, including the Veasey brothers. According to the former executive director of the Pennsylvania Crime Commission, Frederick T. Martens, "Stanfa brought in people, like the Veasey brothers, who had no background in the mob but who were willing to break legs and pull a trigger".

== Trial and life sentence ==
Stanfa was indicted on labor racketeering, extortion, loansharking, murder and conspiracy to commit murder on March 17, 1994. On the day of Stanfa's trial on October 5, 1995, William Veasey, John Veasey's brother who was scheduled to testify against Stanfa, was murdered. On November 21, 1995, Stanfa was convicted of 33 of the 35 charges.

On July 9, 1996, Stanfa was sentenced to life in prison. Ralph Natale took over as boss, but Merlino was the real power in the family, allowing Natale to become boss to direct law enforcement attention away from himself.

As of April 2026, Stanfa is serving his life sentence at the Federal Correctional Institution, Danbury in Connecticut.

American Mafia
Preceded by Nicodemo Scarfo	Philadelphia crime family Boss; 1991–1995	Succeeded by Ralph Natale
