= Yeadon, Pennsylvania =

Borough in Pennsylvania, US

- Borough
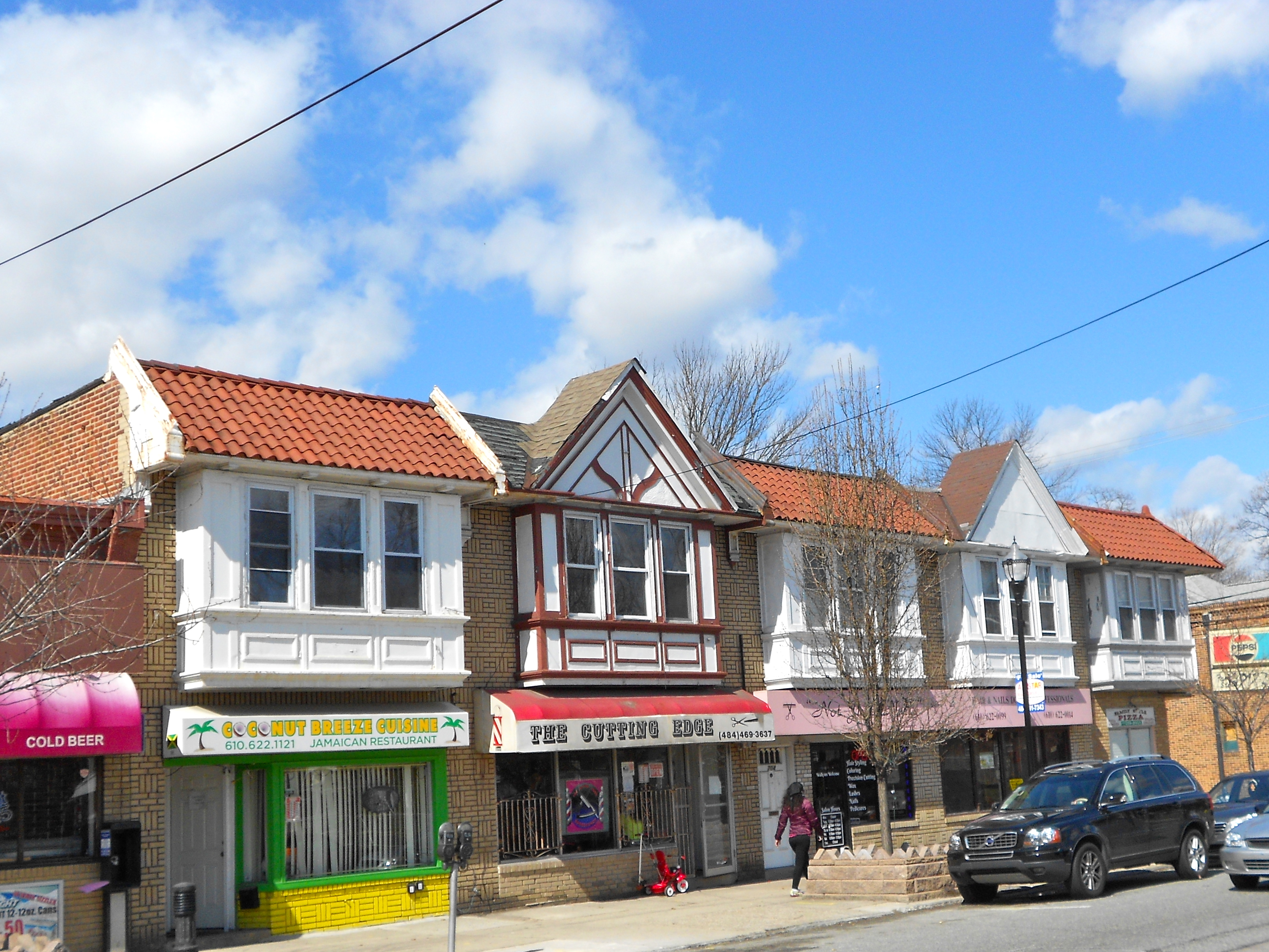
- Downtown stores

- Location in Delaware County and the U.S. state of Pennsylvania.

- Location of Yeadon in Pennsylvania Yeadon (the United States)
- Coordinates: 39°55′58″N 75°15′06″W
- Country: United States
- State: Pennsylvania
- County: Delaware
- Incorporated: 1893

Area
  - Total: 1.59 sq mi (4.13 km^{2})
  - Land: 1.59 sq mi (4.13 km^{2})
  - Water: 0 sq mi (0.00 km^{2})
- Elevation: 69 ft (21 m)

Population (2010)
  - Total: 11,443
  - Estimate (2019): 11,496
  - Density: 7,208/sq mi (2,783.1/km^{2})
- Time zone: UTC-5 (EST)
  - Summer (DST): UTC-4 (EDT)
- ZIP Code: 19050
- Area codes: 610 and 484
- FIPS code: 42-045-86968
- FIPS code: 42-86968
- GNIS feature ID: 1191867
- Website: yeadonborough.com

Yeadon is a borough in Delaware County, Pennsylvania, United States. It borders the city of Philadelphia. As of the 2020 census, Yeadon had a population of 12,054.

== Geography ==
Yeadon is located in eastern Delaware County at 39°55′58″N 75°15′6″W (39.932862, -75.251540). It is bordered on the south by the borough of Darby, on the northwest by the borough Lansdowne, on the west and north by Upper Darby Township, and on the east, across Cobbs Creek, by the city of Philadelphia, whose Center City lies 6 miles (10 km) to the east.

According to the U.S. Census Bureau, Yeadon has a total area of 1.6 square miles (4.1 km^{2}), all land.

== History ==
Yeadon and its surrounding land were once part of New Sweden. Yeadon was then known as the Swedish settlement of Mölndal (founded in 1645). The borough of Yeadon took its name from Yeadon Manor, which takes its name from Yeadon, West Yorkshire, in England.

In the years following World War II, Yeadon became home to a large middle-class African American community. In 1959, the borough's Nile Swim Club became the first swim club owned and operated by African Americans in the United States.

== Notable people ==
- George Ronald Christmas, Philadelphia-born Marine officer and Navy Cross / Purple Heart winner
- William T. Kerr, a native of Pittsburgh and later a resident of Yeadon, founded the American Flag Day Association of Western Pennsylvania in 1888, and became the national chairman of the American Flag Day Association one year later, serving as such for fifty years. He attended President Harry S. Truman's 1949 signing of the Act of Congress that formally established the observance.
- Rose Coyle, Miss America 1936; lived in Yeadon, buried in Holy Cross Cemetery
- John McDermott, first U.S.-born golfer to win the U.S. Open; lived in Yeadon, buried in Holy Cross Cemetery
- Tony Taylor, second baseman for the Philadelphia Phillies and other teams in 1960s and 1970s
- Frank Tinney, Philadelphia-born vaudeville comedian buried in Holy Cross Cemetery
- Frank Sheeran World War 2 veteran, Sheeran served 411 days of combat duty 45th Infantry Division, known as "The Thunderbirds" buried in Holy Cross Cemetery

== Education ==
William Penn School District serves Yeadon. The district was created in 1972; prior to that year, Yeadon was in the Yeadon School District.

- Bell Avenue Elementary School (K-6)
- Evans Elementary School (K-6)
- Penn Wood Middle School (7-8) (Darby)
- Penn Wood High School, Cypress Street Campus (9)
- Penn Wood High School, Green Ave Campus (10-12) (Lansdowne)

== Religion ==
The Roman Catholic Archdiocese of Philadelphia operates Catholic churches. In October 1928, St. Louis Church in Yeadon opened. Circa 2008 1,267 families were registered with the church. In 2013 St. Louis merged into Blessed Virgin Mary Church in Darby, with the St. Louis parish closed.

== Demographics ==
Historical population
Census	Pop.	Note	%±
1900	689		—
1910	882		28.0%
1920	1,308		48.3%
1930	5,430		315.1%
1940	8,524		57.0%
1950	11,068		29.8%
1960	11,610		4.9%
1970	12,136		4.5%
1980	11,727		−3.4%
1990	11,980		2.2%
2000	11,762		−1.8%
2010	11,443		−2.7%
2020	12,054		5.3%

=== Racial and ethnic composition ===
Yeadon borough, Pennsylvania – Racial and ethnic composition Note: the US Census treats Hispanic/Latino as an ethnic category. This table excludes Latinos from the racial categories and assigns them to a separate category. Hispanics/Latinos may be of any race.
Race / Ethnicity (NH = Non-Hispanic)	Pop 2000	Pop 2010	Pop 2020	% 2000	% 2010	% 2020
White alone (NH)	1,809	838	585	15.38%	7.32%	4.85%
Black or African American alone (NH)	9,459	10,052	10,572	80.42%	87.74%	87.71%
Native American or Alaska Native alone (NH)	22	24	24	0.19%	0.21%	0.20%
Asian alone (NH)	101	84	135	0.86%	0.73%	1.12%
Native Hawaiian or Pacific Islander alone (NH)	1	3	0	0.01%	0.03%	0.00%
Other race alone (NH)	16	19	68	0.14%	0.17%	0.53%
Mixed race or Multiracial (NH)	234	207	334	1.99%	1.81%	2.77%
Hispanic or Latino (any race)	120	216	336	1.02%	1.89%	2.79%
Total	11,762	11,443	12,054	100.00%	100.00%	100.00%

=== 2020 census ===
As of the 2020 census, Yeadon had a population of 12,054. The median age was 40.1 years. 20.6% of residents were under the age of 18 and 18.4% of residents were 65 years of age or older. For every 100 females there were 82.5 males, and for every 100 females age 18 and over there were 77.6 males age 18 and over.

100.0% of residents lived in urban areas, while 0.0% lived in rural areas.

There were 4,695 households in Yeadon, of which 29.5% had children under the age of 18 living in them. Of all households, 30.3% were married-couple households, 20.2% were households with a male householder and no spouse or partner present, and 44.2% were households with a female householder and no spouse or partner present. About 31.3% of all households were made up of individuals and 11.6% had someone living alone who was 65 years of age or older.

There were 4,932 housing units, of which 4.8% were vacant. The homeowner vacancy rate was 1.6% and the rental vacancy rate was 4.0%.

=== 2010 census ===
As of Census 2010, the racial makeup of the borough was 7.5% White, 88.6% African American, 0.2% Native American, 0.8% Asian, 0.1% Native Hawaiian and Pacific Islander, 0.6% from other races, and 2.1% from two or more races. Hispanic or Latino of any race were 1.9% of the population.

=== 2000 census ===
As of the 2000 census, there were 11,762 people, 4,696 households, and 2,967 families residing in the borough. The population density was 7,297.1 inhabitants per square mile (2,817.4/km^{2}). There were 4,958 housing units at an average density of 3,075.9 per square mile (1,187.6/km^{2}). The racial makeup of the borough was 79.77% African American, 15.56% White, 0.21% Native American, 0.89% Asian, 0.01% Pacific Islander, 0.41% from other races, and 2.15% from two or more races. Hispanic or Latino of any race were 1.02% of the population.

There were 4,696 households, of which 31.2% had children under the age of 18 living with them, 37.6% were married couples living together, 20.0% had a female householder with no husband present, and 36.8% were non-families. 32.2% of all households were made up of individuals, and 10.9% had someone living alone who was 65 years of age or older. The average household size was 2.43 and the average family size was 3.09.

In the borough, the population was spread out in age, with 24.5% under 18, 7.7% from 18 to 24, 29.8% from 25 to 44, 22.7% from 45 to 64, and 15.4% who were 65 or older. The median age was 38 years. For every 100 females there were 79.7 males. For every 100 females age 18 and over, there were 74.1 males.

The median income for a household in the borough was $45,550, and the median income for a family was $55,169. Males had a median income of $39,830 versus $35,118 for females. The per capita income for the borough was $22,546. About 12.5% of families and 14.6% of the population were below the poverty line, including 5.1% of those under age 18 and 6.7% of those age 65 or over.

== Transportation ==
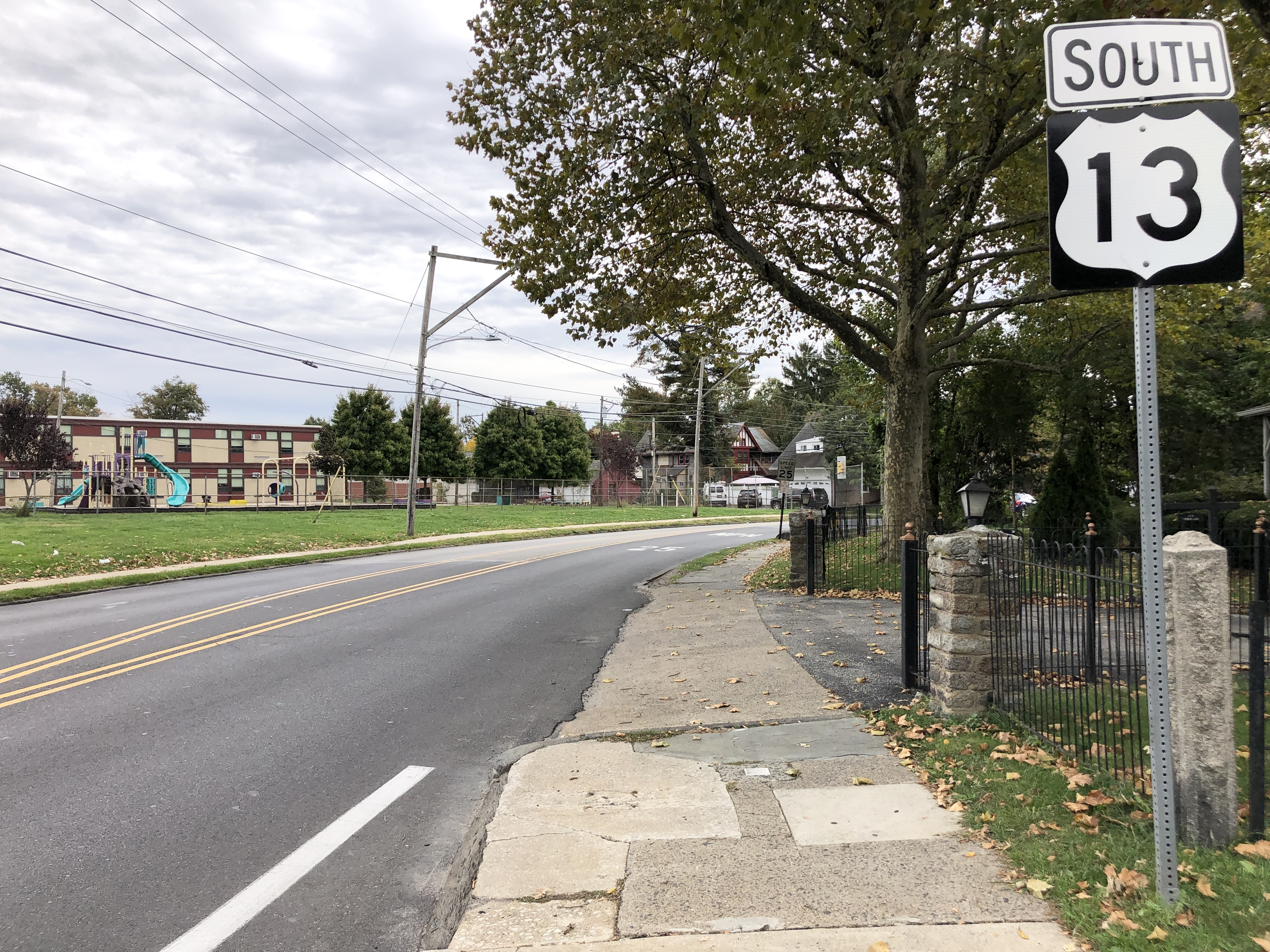
US 13 southbound in Yeadon

As of 2010, there were 21.78 miles (35.05 km) of public roads in Yeadon, of which 2.39 miles (3.85 km) were maintained by the Pennsylvania Department of Transportation (PennDOT) and 19.39 miles (31.21 km) were maintained by the borough.

U.S. Route 13 is the only numbered highway serving Yeadon. It follows a generally southwest-to-northeast alignment through the borough, using MacDade Boulevard, Church Lane and Baltimore Avenue.

Preceded by Darby	Bordering communities of Philadelphia	Succeeded by Upper Darby
