= Riccobene =

Riccobene is a surname of Italian origin. People with that name include:

- Harry Riccobene (1909-2000), American mobster, half-brother of Mario
- Mario Riccobene (1933-1993), American mobster, half-brother of Harry
