= 1983 in organized crime =

== Events ==
- Sicilian mafioso Salvatore Contorno begins anonymously writing letters to the police with information on the Mafia. Michele Greco's powerful position within the Sicilian Mafia is finally realized due to Contorno's revelations.
- Sicilian mafioso Tommaso Buscetta is arrested after, three years previously, fleeing a life sentence. He is sent back to Italy.
- Sicilian mafioso Benito Zito is arrested in Philadelphia, Pennsylvania in a sting operation after selling 2.5 kilos of heroin to undercover DEA Agent Stephen Hopson between June 1983 – August 1983.
- January 10 – Roy DeMeo, a member of the Gambino crime family and head of an elite execution squad for nearly a decade, is murdered, likely by his own men Joey Testa and Anthony Senter, on orders from Paul Castellano.
- April 29 – Philadelphia mobster Pasquale "Pat the Cat" Spirito is shot to death. Gaetano "Tommy Horsehead" Scafidi is assigned the job of fabricating witness testimonies for one of the hitmen.
- July 29 – Italian anti-mafia magistrate, Rocco Chinnici killed in a car bomb, detonated by Pino Greco on the orders of Michele Greco.
- October 26 – Facing life imprisonment (in addition to a 103-year prison sentence), Cleveland mobster Angelo "Big Ange" Lonardo agrees to become a government informant, supplying the FBI with information concerning the Cleveland crime syndicate proving vital in later federal prosecutions. As an underboss, Lonardo became the highest-ranking member ever to become an informant.
- November 13 – Paul Volpe is murdered and found dead the next day in the trunk of his wife's BMW at Pearson International Airport.
- December 6 – Philadelphia mobster Robert Riccobene is shotgunned to death in front of his mother.

== Arts and literature ==
- Scarface (film) starring Al Pacino.
- The Sting II (film)

== Births ==
- June 6 – Dale Cregan, English drug dealer and serial killer

== Deaths ==
- January 10 – Roy DeMeo, Gambino crime family soldier (42)
- January 15 – Meyer Lansky, New York mobster and co-founder of the National Crime Syndicate (80)
- March 12 – Giuseppe Nicoli "Nick" Civella, reputed boss of the Kansas City crime family from 1953 to 1983 (70)
- April 29 – Pasquale "Pat the Cat" Spirito, made member of the Philadelphia crime family (43)
- July 29 – Rocco Chinnici, Italian anti-mafia magistrate (58)
- November 13 – Paul Volpe, Canadian mobster (56)
- December 6 – Robert Riccobene, Philadelphia crime family mobster
