= Steven Mazzone =

American mobster (born 1964)

Steven Mazzone (born 1964) is an American mobster and underboss of the Philadelphia crime family. After the family was decimated by prosecutions during the Nicodemo Scarfo and John Stanfa eras, Ralph Natale was released from prison in 1994. It was at this time Mazzone became a major organized crime figure in Philadelphia.

Mazzone is a childhood friend of Joey Merlino. They both grew up in South Philadelphia and started their criminal careers together. According to Natale and law enforcement, Mazzone was inducted into the crime family in 1995 and made him a caporegime in 1996. Following Natale's 1998 arrest for drug trafficking, Merlino officially took over the family and become the new boss. However their reign was short. Mazzone was indicted and held without bail in 2000 along with Merlino, George Borgesi, and others for racketeering and murder. A year earlier, Natale, feeling slighted and now realizing he may have been a puppet for Merlino all along, decided to end his life as a criminal. Facing the rest of his life in prison for drug trafficking, he decided to cooperate with the government in 1999 and agreed to testify against his former friends. Natale testified that Mazzone was the shooter in the death of mobster "Little Felix" Bocchino on January 29, 1992. Natale also testified that Mazzone was one of the shooters in the failed murder attempt on Joseph Ciangalini Jr., on March 2, 1993. Mazzone and his co-defendants were acquitted of all murder charges at trial in 2001, largely due to credibility issues with the government witnesses.

The defendants were found guilty of racketeering and illegal bookmaking. Mazzone was acquitted of murder, murder conspiracy and attempted murder but convicted of racketeering, extortion and illegal bookmaking and was sentenced to nine years in prison. The upper echelon of the family was once again decimated. Following the indictment and imprisonment of the family's hierarchy, Merlino would remain in control from prison, while installing Joseph "Uncle Joe" Ligambi as the acting boss of the family.

After serving most of his nine-year prison term, Mazzone was transferred to a halfway house then released from federal custody on February 2, 2008. Following his release, Mazzone was to have no contact with other convicted criminals or known mobsters, and he was placed on federally supervised release for three years. Coincidentally, in the months following the expiration date of his parole restrictions, Joseph Ligambi, the acting boss of the family, was arrested himself in May 2011 following a sweeping racketeering indictment that threatened to eradicate the hierarchy of the family once again. Just prior to the indictment, Joseph Merlino was released from federal prison and into a halfway house in Florida.

With Ligambi and others denied bail and forced into waiting out their trial in the federal detention center in Philadelphia, law enforcement believes that Mazzone was elevated to acting boss. Shortly after, Philadelphia TV station Fox 29's news team caught Mazzone on video (without audio) angrily yelling at two alleged crime family associates. Although the exact hierarchy of the Philadelphia Mafia is unknown, Mazzone is believed to hold a high position in it. Local law enforcement, prosecutors, and the FBI all believe that Merlino remains the boss of the family while partially residing in Florida.

On December 15, 2022, Mazzone was sentenced to five years in prison for his involvement in an illegal sports gambling operation, along with loansharking and extortion schemes.
