= Joseph Ida =

Italian-American crime boss

- Born: Giuseppe Ida; 6 November 1890; Fiumara, Calabria, Italy
- Died: 1970s
- Other name: Joe
- Citizenship: American
- Occupation: Crime boss
- Predecessor: Salvatore Sabella
- Successor: Angelo Bruno
- Allegiance: Philadelphia crime family

Giuseppe "Joseph" Ida (Italian: [dʒuˈzɛppe ˈiːda]; 6 November 1890 − 1970s) was the head of the Philadelphia Mafia during the 1940s and 1950s, following the death of Giuseppe Dovi in 1946. Ida retired and returned to Italy in 1959, leaving the title of boss of the Philadelphia crime family to Angelo Bruno.

== Early life ==
Giuseppe Ida was born on 6 November 1890 in Fiumara, a municipality in Calabria, Italy. In 1919, Ida came to America, settled in South Philadelphia and was naturalized. There he met the head Salvatore Sabella, the sub-boss John "Nazzone" Avena and the consigliere Giuseppe "Joe Bruno" Dovi of the local organization. In 1927, Ida, Sabella and three other gangsters were charged with the murder of two of their rivals, but none of the accused was convicted.

== Rise to power ==
Sabella retired in 1931 and John Avena headed the organization until he was murdered in a drive-by shoot in the summer of 1936, and Giuseppe Dovi became the new boss. Ida was named the new underboss by Dovi. In 1946, Dovi died of natural causes in a hospital in New York City and Ida was appointed new head by the so-called Mafia Commission.

Under his leadership, the family gained far more power; he had driven the Jewish mobsters out of their territories, putting an end to the Jewish mob in Philadelphia and South Jersey.

Ida and his organization were heavily influenced by the bosses of the five families; the Luciano crime family in particular sought to influence the activities of other families. As the Philadelphia family gained more power in Atlantic City and southern New Jersey, it was already seen as a larger faction of the Luciano family, under the influence of Underboss Vito Genovese.

Ida and his under boss Dominick "Big Dom" Oliveto were among the around 100 mafia members who took part in the legendary Apalachin meeting in 1957; a gathering of almost all the bosses of the American Cosa Nostra in November 1957, which took place in the community of Apalachin in the State of New York and was stormed by the local police. A total of 62 people were briefly arrested and identified; including Ida and Oliveto. Oliveto withdrew and shortly after Ida was charged with drug trafficking and fled to Italy in 1958.

During his absence, Oliveto's successor Antonio Pollina appointed acting boss; however, was deposed by the commission in 1959 and Angelo "The Gentle Don" Bruno was appointed new boss of the family.

American Mafia
Preceded by Salvatore Sabella	Philadelphia crime family Boss; 1962–1970s	Succeeded by Angelo Bruno
