= Pat Spirito =

American mobster (1939–1983)

- Pasquale "Pat the Cat" Spirito
- Born: Pasquale Spirito; May 26, 1939; Chambersburg, New Jersey, U.S.
- Died: April 29, 1983 (aged 43); East Passyunk Crossing, Philadelphia, Pennsylvania, U.S.
- Other name: "Pat the Cat"
- Occupation: Mobster
- Allegiance: Philadelphia crime family

Pasquale "Pat The Cat" Spirito (May 26, 1939 – April 29, 1983) was an American mobster who was a soldier in the Philadelphia crime family.

== Career ==
Little is known about Spirito's early life. He is the son of Stephen Spirito (1913-2004) and Rose (1917-2018) with one sister Lucille born in 1942. As a front for his illegal activities he gave people the impression that he was a plumber or a hardware store owner. He came from the Italian community of Chambersburg which is now part of Trenton. At one time, Spirito, who was involved in loansharking and bookmaking, was considered a close associate of both Harry Riccobene and of Riccobene's half-brother, Mario. He worked in the Scarfo crime family during the 1980s, during Nicodemo Scarfo's reign. Pasquale (Pat the Cat) Spirito was an associate of made man Joseph (Joey Chang) Ciangalini who introduced Spirito into the life of organized crime. Pat earned the nickname amongst his fellow associates as 'The Cat' because of con artist charm and demeanour. He was an associate until he was the getaway driver in the murder of John Calabrese, a long-time drug dealer who served under Angelo Bruno and then became a 'made man' under Phil Testa with Francis (Faffy) Iannarella and Andrew Thomas DelGiorno at a secret induction ceremony at the home of mob associate Robert (Toro) Locicero in Vineland, New Jersey. He was married but was a constant womanizer. John Calabrese was murdered on October 6, 1981 in Southwest Center City, Philadelphia. Pat recruited Nicholas Caramandi, Charles Iannece, and Ralph Staino Jr. as his associates, eventually elevating them all to 'proposed members' to Scarfo. On June 8, 1980, Phil Testa held a Cosa Nostra initiation ceremony at the South Philadelphia home of mob captain John Cappello.

On February 21, 1981, Spirito and nine other mobsters were indicted on federal racketeering charges relating to loansharking, fraud and illegal gambling. He was convicted under the RICO Act on May 7, 1982. Spirito was sentenced on June 25, 1982 to eight years in prison and fined $10,000.

Spirito was almost shotgunned to death in his Cadillac while driving down the street by Harry Riccobene loyalists. This was shortly before the attempted mob hit of Scarfo crime family capo Salvatore Testa in April 1982. The attempted murder of Spirito was in retaliation for murdering 35-year-old Samuel (Little Sammy) Tammburino, murdered by Charles Iannece and Francis Ianarella as he left a pharmacy-convenience store in South Philadelphia that was owned and operated by Tammburino's parents shooting him sixteen times.

== Downfall and death ==
It is speculated that Spirito was killed because he was being a nuisance to the family, he lacked ambition and willingness to perform hits under the orders of Nicodemo Scarfo, or Scarfo thought he was useless to the organization and that his prominence in the family had to be put to an end like most of Scarfo's former associates and wiseguys. Spirito had recently switched allegiance, aligning himself with Scarfo. It is believed that Spirito had been chosen to kill either Marco or Bobby Riccobene and that when he failed to do so he was marked for death. Furthermore, Phil Leonetti stated in the book Mafia Prince that Scarfo was infuriated when Spirito told Scarfo who should be made captains and soldiers in the family. Scarfo felt insulted that an underling was telling him how to run the Philadelphia Mafia, and thus wanted to have him killed.

Scarfo was starting to kill his associates and other members of the family. An estimated 30 outsiders and made men were dead by the end of his reign, largely due to the Scarfo-Riccobene War and his own paranoia of disloyal and dishonest people. Scarfo ordered him to take out Bobby Riccobene. Spirito was reluctant, and Scarfo sent Nicholas Caramandi and Charles Iannece Jr. to kill him.

On April 29, 1983, Pasquale Spirito was shot two times in the back of the head while sitting in his car in South Philadelphia. Spirito was killed for failing to carry out the contract to kill Robert Riccobene, the brother of Harry Riccobene. Nick Caramandi, during an interview commented,

We tried for months to kill him, and for a while that's all we used to talk about. We used to get sick when we'd see him. We'd want to throw up. Pat had bad vibes and knew what was coming. This guy tried to work my head for hours the day before. He had me in a booth in a luncheonette drinking coffee for four hours, making me tell him how much I love him, and it's already set up to kill him the next night. I said, "Pat, what are you talking like this for? I'd do anything for you. Hey! I wouldn't be here if it weren't for you. Buddy, my life is yours. Jesus Christ, I love you." He was relieved.

Caramandi also said:

"Spirito was not cut out for the Scarfo mob. He had come out of Trenton and moved to South Philadelphia at a time when mob members were low-key operators concentrating on gambling, loan-sharking, and bookmaking. He was greedy and ambitious, attributes that Scarfo could appreciate, but he lacked the killer instinct. He thought he could slide by generating enough money to keep the Little Guy down the shore satisfied. But he underestimated Scarfo's bloodlust. Spirito was a money-maker, but he was also a whiner and complainer." After we killed him, "everybody was happy. Everybody hated him. I never seen a guy hated so much."

== Sources ==
- Blood and Honor: Inside the Scarfo Mob - The Mafia's Most Violent Family by George Anastasia, 2004, ISBN 0-940159-86-4
- https://web.archive.org/web/20080306034240/http://www.nevadaobserver.com/Reading%20Room%20Documents/LCN%20-%20Philadelphia%20and%20Southern%20New%20Jersey%20(1988).htm
- Time (magazine)
- https://books.google.com/books?id=soOaYKep3EYC&dq=Pasquale+%22Pat+the+Cat%22+Spirito&pg=PA40
