= Mario Riccobene =

Philadelphia criminal and federal witness

Mario "Sonny" Riccobene (1933, Enna, Sicily- January 28, 1993, Brooklawn, New Jersey) was a member of the Philadelphia crime family. He later became a federal witness after his son Enrico committed suicide with the fear of being killed by Nicodemo Scarfo and his fellow gangsters. Mario Riccobene later returned to his old lifestyle and in 1993, was murdered by his old associates for cooperating as a government witness. Riccobene had been in the witness protection program but eventually removed from the program because he was unable to follow the rules.

== Early life ==
Born in Philadelphia to Sicilian immigrant parents, he was the half-brother of Harold Riccobene. He joined the Bruno family in the 1950s, frequently working as a driver for Angelo Bruno. He was a partner with his half-brother Harry in a loan-sharking and numbers businesses that they operated out of the DeNittis Talent Agency in South Philadelphia.

== Criminal life ==
During the Bruno-Scarfo war, the violence was increasing and Mario was approached by Scarfo's consigliere Frank Monte to "(turn) over his brother" but he refused. Riccobene ended up telling his brother. In May 1982, Monte was fatally shot in response.

In 1983, he and Harry were convicted of racketeering. He was sentenced to 4 1/2 years in jail and a $10,000 fine.
