= Antonio Pollina =

Italian-American mobster (1892–1993)

- Born: Antonio Domenico Pollina; September 20, 1892; Caccamo, Sicily, Italy
- Died: February 27, 1993 (aged 100); South Philadelphia, Pennsylvania, U.S.
- Resting place: Holy Cross Cemetery, Yeadon, Pennsylvania, U.S.
- Other name: Mr. Miggs
- Citizenship: American
- Occupation: Crime boss
- Spouse: Maria Pollina
- Allegiance: Philadelphia crime family

Antonio Domenico "Mr. Miggs" Pollina (September 20, 1892 – February 27, 1993) was an Italian-American mobster and was the short-lived boss of the Philadelphia crime family during the late 1950s.

== Early life ==
Antonio Pollina was born in Caccamo, Sicily and became a naturalized American citizen in 1944. His rap sheet dated back to 1927 and included arrests for murder, concealed weapons, untaxed liquor, assault & battery. His legitimate employment was as a cheese salesman for Maggio Cheese Co. Pollina was one of the top leaders of the mafia group known as "The Greaser Gang" and controlled a large loanshark operation.

== Boss ==
In 1959, Pollina was given control of the family when Joseph Ida fled the United States to avoid an indictment on narcotic charges. Pollina began plotting the murder of Angelo Bruno.

Pollina ordered his Underboss, Ignazio Denaro, to murder Angelo Bruno, but Denaro instead informed Bruno of Pollina's intentions. Bruno used his connections to The Commission to take Pollina's power away from him. The Commission authorized Bruno to murder Pollina. Pollina stepped down and Angelo Bruno replaced him and kept Denaro as his underboss.
