= Frank Sindone =

American mobster

Philadelphia Police Department mugshot of Frank Sindone

Frank Sindone (1928 – October 29, 1980), also known as "Barracuda Frank", was an American mobster. He was a loan shark and soldier in the Bruno crime family who helped plot the 1980 murder of family mob boss Angelo Bruno.

== Personal background ==
Sindone was described as the chief loanshark of Angelo Bruno, suggesting that he may have run a family bank or large scale operation for Bruno. Sindone had previously served time for narcotics trafficking and was heavily involved in illegal gambling within the Philadelphia metropolitan area. Sindone also operated in concert with Philadelphia family associate, Harry D'Ascenzo, who had ties to mobsters in Baltimore. Sindone was made into the Philadelphia family in the early 1970s together with Joseph Ciancaglini. They were the last mob associates to be made into the family under Bruno.

== Murder of Angelo Bruno ==
In 1980, Sindone joined forces with consigliere Antonio Caponigro, capo John Simone from Newark, New Jersey, and Frank Tieri, the boss of the New York Genovese crime family, in a plan to overthrow Bruno.

Their motive for killing Bruno stemmed from a money dispute. Tieri had recently demanded a larger percentage of the revenues from Caponigro's two million dollar bookmaking operation in Hudson County, New Jersey. Bruno opposed giving Tieri this extra money and pleaded his family's case to the Mafia Commission. The Commission sided with Bruno and refused Tieri's request.

However, Tieri was still determined to take over Caponigro's bookmaking operation. Learning that Caponigro was planning to overthrow Bruno, Tieri told Caponigro that he would get the Commission's approval for the hit and provide other assistance. Tieri never went to the Commission, but he nevertheless told Caponigro he had the Commission's blessing. On March 21, 1980, an unknown gunman, believed to have been Caponigro's cousin Alfred Salerno, shot and killed Bruno in his car.

== Deaths of the conspirators ==
After Bruno's assassination, Sindone's plan was to become underboss of the Philadelphia family with Caponigro as boss. However, less than a month later, Caponigro and his cousin were found stuffed in the trunks of two cars a few miles apart in the South Bronx section of New York City. On September 17, 1980, John Simone was found dead. On October 29, 1980, Frank Sindone was found dead in an alley behind a variety store in South Philadelphia, shot three times in the head.

All indications were that the Mafia Commission had murdered all four men in retribution for the unsanctioned murder of Bruno.

Sindone was buried at Holy Cross Cemetery in Yeadon, the same cemetery where Angelo Bruno was interred.

== See also ==
- List of unsolved murders (1980–1999)
