= Joseph Ligambi =

American mobster

- Born: August 9, 1939 (age 87); South Philadelphia, Philadelphia, Pennsylvania, U.S.
- Occupation: Philadelphia crime family mobster

Joseph Anthony "Uncle Joe" Ligambi (born August 9, 1939) is an American mobster and former acting boss of the Philadelphia crime family. Ligambi is known among law enforcement circles to have a more "old school" approach, in sharp contrast to boss Joseph Merlino's flamboyant, high-profile style. Ligambi was credited by the Philadelphia Police Department's Criminal Intelligence Unit with "quietly bringing stability back to the troubled Philadelphia-South Jersey branch of the American Mafia" during the 2000s. The New York Mafia families were pleased with Ligambi and his approach, as well as his ability to turn the Philadelphia crime family back into a stable group.

== Early life ==
Ligambi was born on August 9, 1939, in South Philadelphia, one of four children born to Italian immigrant parents. His father was a cab driver. He attended South Philadelphia High School before dropping out his junior year to join the United States Air Force, where he eventually earned his high school diploma. Ligambi is the uncle of Philadelphia mobster George Borgesi.

== Early criminal career ==
Unlike many other gangsters who started their careers in crime as teenagers or young adults, Ligambi didn't have a criminal record before age 32 when he was arrested for cigarette smuggling. In the 1970s, he started to associate himself with mobster brothers "Yogi" and Salvatore "Chuckie" Merlino and worked as a bartender at a frequent mobster hangout. Ligambi would become a protege of Merlino, who in turn was close to powerful crime family member Nicodemo Scarfo. During this time, Ligambi started making money helping run illegal bookmaking operations for the Merlino crew. He earned a reputation as an expert in sports handicapping, particularly for football. By 1981, the Philadelphia crime family was being led by Scarfo, with Merlino serving as his underboss.

In 1985, Scarfo ordered the murder of Mafia associate Frank "Frankie Flowers" D'Alfonso for refusing to pay tribute to him. When Philadelphia mobsters Thomas DelGiorno and Eugene Milano became government witnesses, they testified in court that on July 23, Ligambi and Philip Narducci were the triggermen in the broad daylight hit and Frank Narducci (Philip's brother) was the driver. DelGiorno, Milano, Merlino and Francis "Faffy" Iannarella helped plan the murder. Ligambi became a made man in the Philadelphia crime family in 1986, at the age of 47.

== Murder conviction and acquittal ==
In 1987, Ligambi was arrested alongside Scarfo and others for the D'Alfonso murder. On April 5, 1989, Ligambi, Chuckie Merlino, Nicodemo Scarfo Sr., Francis Iannarella, Frank Narducci and Phil Narducci were convicted of the murder and were all given life sentences. In 1992, an appellate court panel overturned the murder convictions, citing prosecutorial misconduct and trial-court error. At the retrial in 1997, Ligambi and his fellow defendants were acquitted of the murder.

== Acting boss ==
At the time of Ligambi's release in 1997, the family was being run by Ralph Natale and Joey Merlino, the son of Ligambi's mentor Salvatore. While Ligambi was in prison, Merlino led a crew of young mobsters who fought a war and took over the Philadelphia crime family. One of these young mobsters was George Borgesi, Ligambi's nephew. After the arrest of Merlino, Borgesi and several others in 1999, Ligambi was chosen to take over as acting boss of the family. In 2001, Merlino was sentenced to 14 years in prison. After Ligambi took over, he remained in the shadows, rarely being mentioned in the media, while taking a much less "trigger-happy" approach to running the family.

Ligambi had a no-show job with Top Job Carpeting run by fellow Philadelphia crime family member, Mauro Goffredo.

On May 23, 2011, Ligambi and 14 other members and associates of the crime family were indicted by the FBI on racketeering charges related to illegal gambling operations, video poker gambling machines and loan sharking. In February 2013, Ligambi was denied bail after the jury dismissed gambling and extortion charges. On January 28, 2014, two juries were hung on the racketeering charges, and Ligambi and Borgesi were acquitted and released.

In 2020 court documents, Ligambi was identified as the consigliere of the Philadelphia crime family.
