= Frank Monte =

Member of the Philadelphia crime family (1931–1982)

- Born: June 21, 1931; South Philadelphia, U.S.
- Died: May 13, 1982 (aged 50)
- Occupation: Former Consigliere of the Philadelphia crime family

Frank Monte (June 21, 1931 in South Philadelphia – May 13, 1982 in South Philadelphia) was a member of the Philadelphia crime family. When Nicodemo Scarfo became boss, he named Monte as his consigliere. When Harry Riccobene refused to accept Scarfo as boss, the "Riccobene War" ensued. In 1979 Testa, Salvatore (Chuckie) Merlino, and Robert (Bobby) Lumio murdered 31-year-old drug dealer Michael (Coco) Cifelli. He was murdered for selling drugs to the son of Frank Monte, a capo from Cinnaminson Township, New Jersey. Frank served under Phil Testa and later Nicky Scarfo. He oversaw illegal gambling operations in Atlantic City and New Jersey for the crime family. Michael Cifelli was gunned down by Testa and Salvatore (Chuckie) Merlino as he was talking on the phone in a telephone booth just inside a bar, Priori's, at 10th and Wolf St. Monte was later promoted to be consigliere in 1981 by Nicky Scarfo.

Monte was murdered by a sniper rifle on May 13, 1982 on the orders of Riccobene. When the killers were arrested, they agreed to cooperate with law enforcement for lighter prison sentences. The men testified for the prosecution that Riccobene ordered them to kill Monte. Riccobene was convicted of the murder in 1984 and sentenced to life in prison.
