= Philadelphia crime family =

Mafia family based in Philadelphia

- Founded: c. 1911; 115 years ago
- Founder: Salvatore Sabella
- Named after: Angelo Bruno
- Founding location: Philadelphia, Pennsylvania, United States
- Years active: c. 1911–present
- Territory: Primarily the Philadelphia metropolitan area, including South Jersey and Delaware, with additional territory in North Jersey and Boston, as well as South Florida
- Ethnicity: Italians as "made men" and other ethnicities as associates
- Membership (est.): 55 made members and 250 associates (1990); 50 made members and 100 associates (2004)
- Activities: Racketeering, gambling, bookmaking, sports betting, loansharking, extortion, labor racketeering and corruption, political corruption, drug trafficking, illicit cigarette trade, gunrunning, smuggling, armed robbery, fencing, fraud, money laundering, prostitution, assault, and murder
- Allies: Bufalino crime family; DeCavalcante crime family; Detroit Partnership; Gambino crime family; Genovese crime family; Lucchese crime family; Patriarca crime family; Pittsburgh crime family; 10th & Oregon Crew; Junior Black Mafia; K&A Gang; Pagan's MC; Philadelphia Greek Mob; Warlocks MC
- Rivals: Black Mafia; Hells Angels MC; and various other gangs in the Philadelphia area, including their allies

The Philadelphia crime family (Note: also known as the Bruno–Scarfo crime family, the Philadelphia–Atlantic City crime family, the Philadelphia Mafia, the Philly Mafia, the Philadelphia–South Jersey Mafia, or the South Philly Mafia) is an Italian American Mafia crime family based in Philadelphia, Pennsylvania. Formed and based in South Philadelphia, the criminal organization operates throughout the Philadelphia metropolitan area, including South Jersey. The family is notorious for its violence, its succession of violent bosses, and multiple mob wars.

Operating as the Bruno crime family under the 21-year reign of boss Angelo Bruno (1959–1980), the family enjoyed an era of peace and prosperity. A complex dispute involving disgruntled subordinates and territory claims by New York's Genovese crime family led to Bruno's murder in 1980. The killing marked the beginning of years of internal violence for control of the Philadelphia family, leading to a gradual decline in the family's stability.

Bruno was succeeded as boss by his loyal friend, Philip "The Chicken Man" Testa; however, within a year of Bruno's murder, Testa was also murdered, killed in a nail bomb explosion in 1981. When the dust settled from Bruno and Testa's deaths, Nicodemo "Little Nicky" Scarfo emerged as boss of the crime family. During Scarfo's reign, the family was known as the Scarfo crime family. (Note: see the following:) Scarfo's 10-year reign saw the family grow in power, but also become highly dysfunctional. Unlike Bruno, Scarfo was infamous for his short temper and penchant for violence. Scarfo increasingly involved the family in narcotics trafficking and demanded that all criminals pay a street tax for operating in his territory. Scarfo also did not hesitate to order people murdered over moderate disputes. The dramatic rise in violence attracted increased attention from the Federal Bureau of Investigation (FBI), Pennsylvania State Police and New Jersey State Police. Increased violence and law enforcement prosecutions also convinced several mobsters to cooperate with the government in order to escape death or prison. Scarfo's downfall came in 1988, when he and most of his top allies were arrested and sentenced to long prison terms.

With Scarfo's imprisonment, the Mafia hierarchy was convinced that Scarfo was unfit for the position of boss. Once Scarfo was deposed due to rising tensions within the family, John Stanfa was named boss of the Philadelphia family in 1991. A faction of young mobsters led by Joey Merlino disputed Stanfa's ascension, however, launching another war in the family by 1992. The war ended in 1994, when Stanfa and most of his supporters were arrested by the FBI, though less intensified fighting continued until 1996 and began to involve violence from outside the family until the early 2000s. Merlino subsequently took control of the family and allegedly ran the family to varying degrees for the following two decades.

The Philadelphia family has been significantly weakened over the past 30 years due to internal violence, government turncoats, and law enforcement action following the passage of the RICO Act. The crime reporter George Anastasia has described the organization as one of the two most dysfunctional Mafia families in the United States, along with the Patriarca crime family of New England. Despite this, the family still remains one of the most active and powerful Mafia groups in the United States.

== History ==
=== Beginnings ===
In the early 20th century, several Italian immigrant and Italian-American street gangs in South Philadelphia formed what eventually became the Philadelphia crime family. Salvatore Sabella was the first leader of the group that would later bear his name. They busied themselves with bootlegging, extortion, loansharking, and illegal gambling, and it was during the Prohibition era that Sabella and his crew were recognized as members of the wider Sicilian crime syndicate of New York City and Chicago. Sabella retired in late 1931.

=== First Philadelphia Mafia War ===
After Sabella's retirement, two of his top lieutenants, John Avena and Giuseppe Dovi, began a five-year war for control of the family. Avena was murdered by members of his own faction on August 17, 1936, and Joseph "Joe Bruno" Dovi became boss of the Philadelphia family.

Dovi had good connections with the Chicago Outfit and the Five Families of New York City, and he expanded operations outside of South Philadelphia to the Greater Philadelphia area, including Atlantic City, New Jersey and other parts of South Jersey. Narcotics, illegal gambling, loansharking, and extortion activities provided the family's income, and connections to the Genovese and Gambino crime families grew throughout the 1930s and early 1940s.

On October 22, 1946, Dovi died of natural causes at a New York City hospital, and Giuseppe "Joseph" Ida was appointed by the Commission to run the Philadelphia family and its rackets.

=== Vito Genovese ===
Joe Ida ran the family throughout the 1940s and early 1950s. Ida and the Philadelphia organization were heavily influenced by the bosses of the Five Families, especially the Genovese family, which sought to control the Philadelphia family. Vito Genovese, an underboss at the time, assumed control of what would become the Genovese family in 1957 after the shooting of former boss Frank Costello, who subsequently retired due to illness.

As the Philadelphia family gained more power in Atlantic City and South Jersey, it was viewed merely as a Genovese faction due to the Genoveses' substantial amount of influence over the Philadelphia family at the time. After a 1956 Commission meeting, however, the crime families of Philadelphia and Detroit, headed by Ida and Giuseppe "Joseph" Zerilli respectively, were added to the Commission, establishing the Philadelphia family as its own organization independent of control by New York crime families.

Ida and his underboss Dominick Olivetto were present during the Apalachin meeting in 1957 with roughly 100 other top mobsters. The meeting was raided by U.S. law enforcement, and over 60 mafiosi were arrested and indicted for association with known organized crime members. Ida was named in the indictment and fled to Sicily not long after the meeting, leaving Antonio "Mr. Migs" Pollina as acting boss in Ida's absence.

=== Angelo Bruno ===
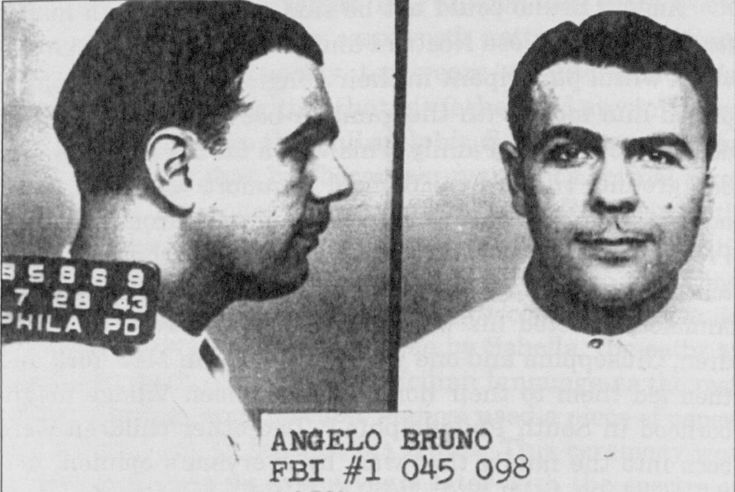
A mugshot of Angelo Bruno in 1943

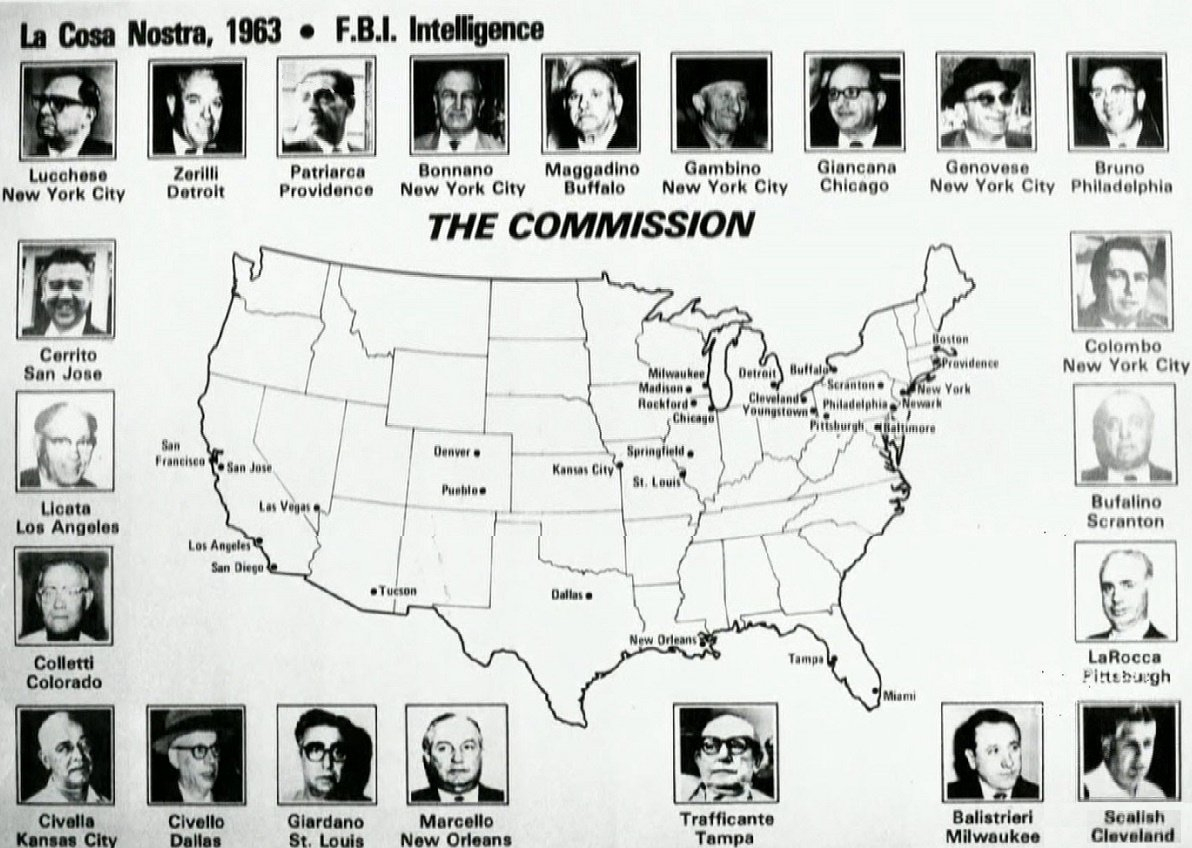
FBI chart of La Cosa Nostra Commission in 1963

After Ida retired in 1959 and Pollina was demoted, Angelo Bruno was appointed by the Commission to run the Philadelphia family. Bruno, the first boss of Philadelphia with an influential seat on the Commission, was born in Sicily and was a close ally of Carlo Gambino, solidifying his position as leader of the Philadelphia Mafia. Bruno used his contacts and his own business mind to maintain respect and power among other Mafia bosses in the country. He expanded the family's profit and operations in Atlantic City, which, due in part to its location within the Philadelphia metro area, had naturally become known as the Philadelphia family's turf. Bruno himself avoided the intense media and law enforcement scrutiny and kept violence down. He spent almost three years in prison for refusing to testify at a 1970 hearing on organized crime in the state of New Jersey. After his release, he spent some time in Italy before returning to the United States in 1977.

Bruno had a reputation for seeking peaceful solutions to family issues instead of violence. He was sometimes referred to as the "Gentle Don" due to his apparent reluctance to resort to violence or murder if other means of conflict resolution among family members were available, though he had no strong aversion to violence outside of the family. While he preferred negotiation, intimidation, and persuasion or coercion, he generally avoided, if possible, certain violent tactics for pragmatic reasons; mostly, he believed that excessive violence would bring police attention, disrupt cohesion among his ranks, and jeopardize his illegal businesses and ties with ostensibly legitimate businesses and politicians. Bruno oversaw the family's gambling syndicate and preferred more traditional operations such as labor racketeering and union infiltration, extortion and protection rackets, loan sharking, numbers games, and other illegal gambling operations, including infiltrating legitimate businesses. Outside of most family issues, however, violence was still the modus operandi of the Philly Mafia; by the late 1960s, the Philadelphia family used violence and intimidation to control various unions in the food and service industry, such as Local 54 of the Hotel Employees and Restaurant Employees Union. The crime family plundered the local's health and welfare funds and used its control to extort money from bars and restaurants. Mafia members owned or had a controlling interest in many restaurants, bars, and social clubs throughout the Philadelphia/South Jersey area. During the early 1960s, the Philadelphia family was officially recognized as the Bruno family.

Bruno focused mostly on low-risk crimes and gave his subordinates autonomy as long as he received a share of the profits. He prohibited any of his men from getting involved in narcotics trafficking, fearing the long prison sentences that drug trafficking charges could bring. Many of his men disagreed with this decision, seeing the large profits that could be made. Some mobsters, like Philip "the Chicken Man" Testa, Antonio "Tony Bananas" Caponigro, Harry "the Hunchback" Riccobene, and Raymond "Long John" Martorano, ran drug trafficking operations clandestinely without Bruno's knowledge. His men were further angered because Bruno accepted money from Giovanni "John" Gambino in order to allow the Gambino family to sell heroin on Philadelphia family turf in South Jersey.

For decades, the Mafia controlled criminal rackets in Philadelphia's African-American neighborhoods, financing Black numbers operations and supplying heroin to Black drug dealers. In 1970, Samuel "Beyah" Christian and other African-American organized crime figures formed the Black Mafia to take control of illegal activities in the Black neighborhoods of Philadelphia from the Italian Mafia, a venture which was partially successful. After the Black Mafia began extorting Philadelphia family operatives in African-American areas, Bruno eventually acquiesced control of some gambling rackets which had historically been dominated by Italian-American mobsters. As per the agreement, Black gangsters were required to pay a "street tax" to the Bruno family in order to engage in the rackets. The Black Mafia became defunct as a result of a string of convictions and internal killings during the mid-1970s.

Bruno also faced pressure from New York's Five Families to let them have a cut of the business in Atlantic City, a Philadelphia Mafia-controlled city that was at the time transitioning from a city in decline to a gambling mecca. Following its early 20th-century heyday as a respected resort town, Atlantic City had been suffering from a sharp decline in the decades prior to the 1970s. With the introduction of legalized casino gambling in 1977, Atlantic City once again became particularly desired turf for organized crime. However, Atlantic City had long been reckoned as a fief of the Philadelphia family. Under longstanding Mafia rules, the Five Families could only come into Atlantic City with the Philadelphia family's permission—something Bruno was unwilling to give.

On October 15, 1976, Carlo Gambino died of a heart attack. With Gambino gone, Bruno lost his most important ally in the underworld. Many of Bruno's subordinates felt that they were missing out on money because of Bruno's old-fashioned and content ways. His consigliere, Tony Caponigro, who hoped to expand the family's drug operations and was heavily involved in the drug trade largely unbeknownst to and against the wishes of Bruno, approached Genovese family boss Frank "Funzi" Tieri in order to seek the Commission's permission to kill Bruno and take over the crime family. Tieri, sensing an opportunity to take Caponigro's North Jersey gambling operation and set up operations in Atlantic City, lied to Caponigro and told him he had the Commission's support. On March 21, 1980, Bruno was shotgunned in the back of the head while in his car in South Philadelphia by a gunman working for Caponigro. That April, Caponigro visited New York City under the assumption that he was going to be confirmed as boss. Instead, he was tortured and murdered for killing a Commission member without permission. Caponigro's co-conspirators Frank Sindone, Alfred Salerno, and John Simone were also murdered for killing a mob boss without the permission of the Commission.

=== Second Philadelphia Mafia War (1980–1984) ===
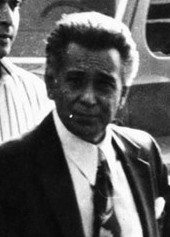
An FBI photo of Nicodemo Scarfo

Beginning with Bruno's murder in 1980 and the subsequent murder of Caponigro and his co-conspirators, a violent struggle for power erupted within the Philadelphia Mafia. Bruno's successor, his former underboss [[Philip Testa]], lasted just under a year as the boss of the family before he was killed by a nail bomb under his front porch on March 15, 1981. Testa's murder was orchestrated by Frank "Chickie" Narducci in yet another attempt to take control of the family. Peter Casella and Nicodemo "Little Nicky" Scarfo, Testa's underboss and consigliere respectively, were both vying to take over the family. Violence between the two factions ensued. Scarfo was close with Genovese family consigliere Louis "Bobby" Manna and approached the Genovese hierarchy with his suspicions that Narducci and Casella orchestrated Testa's murder. The Genovese family set up a meeting with Scarfo and Casella, where Casella confessed that Narducci killed Testa so that they could take over the family. Narducci was killed and Casella was banished from the mob and fled to Florida, leaving Scarfo the major candidate for boss of the family. However, the war continued in spite of, or because of, Scarfo's apparent nomination to boss.

Nicodemo Scarfo was a powerful Bruno family mobster who operated mostly in Atlantic City prior to his accession to boss. Atlantic City witnessed an economic boom after enacting measures allowing casino gambling in the late 1970s. Scarfo was able to expand his power base by infiltrating the expanding construction and service industries in Atlantic City. Despite Atlantic City being turf of the Philadelphia Mafia, Scarfo let the Commission and New York crime families operate in Atlantic City under his discretion in return for their support for him as boss. Scarfo named Salvatore "Chuckie" Merlino as his underboss and Frank Monte as his consigliere. Scarfo demoted Bruno's mob captains and replaced them with "Crazy Phil" Leonetti, Lawrence "Yogi" Merlino and Joseph "Chickie" Ciancaglini Sr., leading to further Mafia warring from disgruntled soldiers who were formerly well-situated under Bruno and Testa's reign but passed over by Scarfo, as well as from Philly Mafia soldiers in South Jersey who were angry that Scarfo was allowing New York mobsters to operate in Atlantic City. Scarfo eventually emerged triumphant despite considerable violent opposition and multiple murders.

The last person to stand in Scarfo's way was the well-respected, long-time Philadelphia crime family mobster and "made man", Harry Riccobene. Believing that Scarfo was an unfit and greedy boss, Riccobene refused to pay his tribute to Scarfo. While Angelo Bruno apparently never asked Riccobene for a regular or unreasonable share of his illicit profits, Scarfo demanded a typical "kick up" tribute, which angered Riccobene, as he did not view Scarfo as a legitimate or appropriate successor to the position of boss. With Scarfo off the street serving a brief prison term in Texas, the "Riccobene War" ensued between 1982 and 1984 as part of the larger Second Philadelphia Mafia War in the 1980s. The Scarfo faction was able to kill three of Riccobene's men. The Riccobene faction was able to kill Scarfo's consigliere Frank Monte, while Riccobene himself survived two attempts on his life. In 1984, the two gunmen in the Monte murder, along with Riccobene's brother, were arrested and agreed to cooperate with authorities. They testified at trial that Riccobene ordered Monte's murder. Riccobene was convicted and sentenced to life in prison, ending the war.

=== "Little Nicky" Scarfo's reign (1981–1990) ===
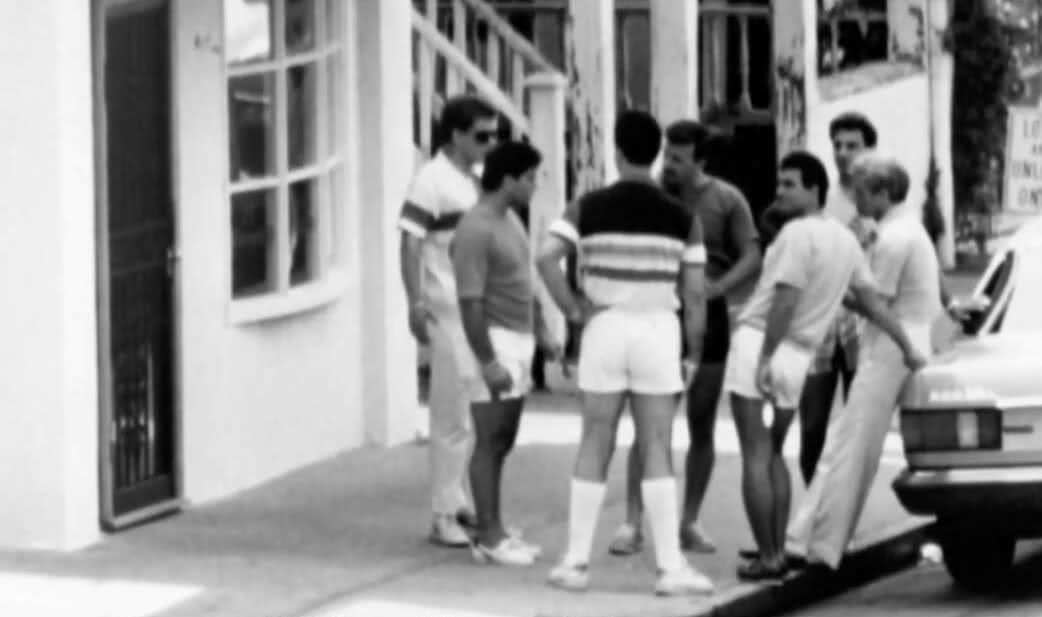
An FBI photo of the Philly mob congregating, including Phil Leonetti, Joey Pungitore, Philip Narducci, and Nicholas Milano

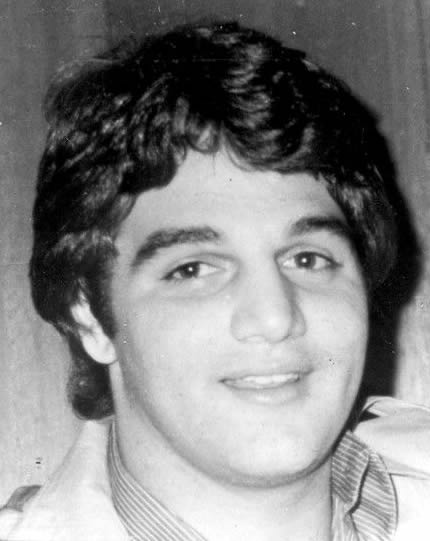
Salvatore Testa, killed in Gloucester Township, New Jersey, September 14, 1984, on orders from Philly mob boss Nicodemo Scarfo

When Nicky Scarfo became boss, he wanted to unify organized crime in the area and dreamed of running a smooth criminal empire. He soon imposed a "street tax" on all criminal rackets in Philadelphia and South Jersey. Although financially extorting criminals is a common Mafia racket, it was a somewhat alien practice in Philadelphia. Enforced by soldiers and associates of the family, the tax was paid by criminals working independently from the Mafia, including drug dealers, bookmakers, loan sharks, pimps, and number runners operating in territory that Scarfo deemed his own, were forced to pay his street tax weekly. Those who refused to pay the tax were often murdered. Loan shark, drug dealer and pawn shop owner John Calabrese was killed by Joseph Ciancaglini Sr., Tommy DelGiorno, Frank Iannarella and Pasquale "Pat the Cat" Spirito. Frankie "Flowers" D'Alfonso was brutally beaten by Salvatore Testa and Joey Pungitore for refusing to pay the street tax. He was later murdered in 1985.

The crime family's biggest racket was the control of labor unions. During Bruno's and Scarfo's reigns, the Philadelphia Mafia maintained some degree of influence over Roofers Union Local 30, Iron Workers Union Local 405, Laborers Union Local 332 and Teamsters Union Locals 107, 158, 331 and 837. The crime family used this influence to extort businesses, steal from the union treasuries and receive paychecks and benefits for little to no work.

Scarfo also got the crime family heavily involved in methamphetamine trafficking, which was the drug of choice in the Philadelphia/South Jersey area. At first, the family extorted money from local meth dealers. When Greek-American gangster Chelsais "Steve" Bouras, boss of the Philadelphia Greek Mob, began intruding on the methamphetamine trade in Philadelphia and refused to pay Scarfo's street tax, Scarfo had him killed. Although the Greek mob had long been a close ally and partner of the Philadelphia Mafia, and despite the fact that some Philadelphia Italian crime family members were themselves heavily involved in Bouras's methamphetamine trafficking ring, the hot-headed and ruthless Scarfo decided to send a message to all local crime organizations about respecting the street tax and the primacy of the Philadelphia crime family by having Bouras killed in public. Bouras was eating dinner with his girlfriend, friends, and Scarfo soldier Raymond Martorano when a hit team ambushed and killed Bouras along with his girlfriend.

The Philadelphia family then started controlling the meth trade in the area by supplying illicit P2P (the key meth ingredient) to meth manufacturers. By controlling the supply of P2P, the Philadelphia mob was generally able to control the methamphetamine trade in the Philadelphia/South New Jersey area. Some criminals borrowed money from Mafia members to finance meth operations (and benefited from working with the Mafia instead of being extorted by them). The crime family also had some involvement in cocaine and marijuana trafficking.

Scarfo became notorious for his ruthless, paranoid nature. Scarfo demanded complete allegiance to him and ordered people murdered over signs of disrespect, insubordination or resistance. Described by a former crime family member:

[i]f you were in good graces with him, he loves you and you love him. You understand? But you never knew from one day to the next. He'd turn on anybody, and he drew no lines when it came to killing. Most Mob bosses were not like him. The Mob is basically run the same in every city, but our "family" was unusual in that it was a very paranoid family because we all feared each other and feared Scarfo the most. He held grudges. If you didn't say hello to him 20 years ago, he never forgot. He used to say, "I'm like the turtle. I get there." You know, we were the best of friends. He believed in me, and I believed in him. But he was very, very paranoid. He betrayed himself. His own nephew turned.

— Nicholas "the Crow" Caramandi

Soon after his promotion to boss, the number of organized crime-related murders escalated in the 1980s. Philadelphia mobster-turned-government witness Nicholas "Nicky the Crow" Caramandi described Scarfo's violent nature in a 2001 interview:

Scarfo was a cowboy. He didn't want a guy taken in a house and shot easily in the back of the head. He wanted it outside, in broad daylight, with a million people around. Restaurants, funeral homes, anywhere. Then it gets written up in the papers, and it puts fear in people. He loved that cowboy stuff.

Scarfo had inducted member Pat Spirito murdered in 1983. During the Riccobene War, Spirito switched sides and aligned himself with Scarfo, but was killed for turning down a murder contract on Riccobene's brother. But Scarfo's downfall began on September 14, 1984, when Scarfo loyalist Salvatore "Salvie" Testa was murdered. Despite Testa serving faithfully under Scarfo and committing several murders on his behalf, Scarfo granted his underboss Salvatore Merlino permission to kill Testa for breaking off his engagement with Merlino's daughter. After this, other members and crime families saw Scarfo as untrustworthy and paranoid. He also started to earn a negative reputation within his organization, which led to members turning informant in the late 1980s. After Merlino's drinking problem got out of hand, Scarfo demoted him to soldier and promoted his nephew Phil Leonetti as his new underboss.

In November 1988, Scarfo and 16 of his men were convicted of racketeering, ten murders, five attempted murders, extortion, gambling and narcotics trafficking. Along with Scarfo, underboss Philip Leonetti, three of the family's four capos, or captains, Joseph Ciancaglini, Francis Iannarella Jr. and Santo Idone, and soldiers such as Albert Pontani, Salvatore Merlino and Charles Iannece were arrested. The prosecutions were strengthened by Mafia members Tommy DelGiorno and Nicky Caramandi agreeing to cooperate with law enforcement and testify at trial for the government in order to escape long prison terms and Scarfo's ruthless regime. Fifteen of the defendants received prison sentences ranging from 30 to 55 years, including Scarfo.

Leonetti was the next defector who agreed to cooperate with the Federal Bureau of Investigation (FBI) after being sentenced to 45 years in prison. Many more mobsters would later be sentenced to long prison terms for crimes such as racketeering, narcotics trafficking and murder. This caused the number of Mafia members in the family to dwindle in the 1990s, with fewer new guys available to replace all those being convicted of serious crimes. By 1990, 21 members were incarcerated, 11 were under indictment, and six turned government witnesses. The Pennsylvania Crime Commission reported that there were only 24 members who were free and not facing criminal charges.

=== John Stanfa and the Third Philadelphia Mafia War (1990–1996) ===
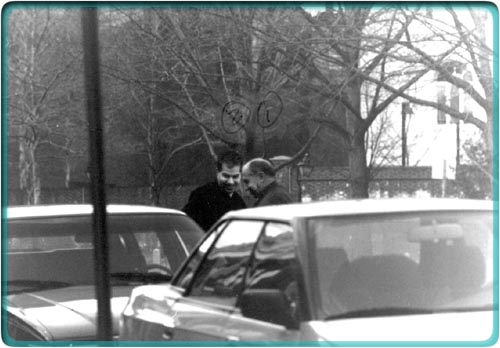
John Stanfa (right) talking to Tommy "Horsehead" Scafidi

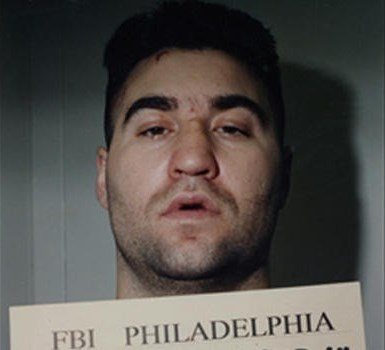
John Stanfa recruited John Veasey as an enforcer during the war with Joey Merlino. Veasey later became a government turncoat, testifying for the prosecution at Stanfa's trial.

With many of Scarfo's loyalists serving lengthy prison terms, it became clear that Scarfo would not be able to maintain control of the crime family from prison much longer. To avoid a total power vacuum in the Philadelphia Mafia, Giovanni "John" Stanfa, a Sicilian-born mobster with the support and endorsement of the influential Gambino and Genovese families in New York, was named boss of the Philadelphia family in 1990. Word was sent to the imprisoned Scarfo in October 1990, with Scarfo being informed that he was no longer boss and that Stanfa had been installed as boss, though Stanfa wasn't officially installed as boss until 1991. The New York Mafia's intrusion in Philadelphia Mafia affairs was not well received by many of the younger Philadelphia-born mobsters in the crime family, including Joseph "Skinny Joey" Merlino, the son of former underboss Salvatore Merlino, who saw Stanfa as an outsider who had not worked his way up in the organization due to being imprisoned during the entire Scarfo era.

While serving prison time together in 1990, Merlino met Ralph Natale. According to Natale, he and Merlino began plotting to take over the Philadelphia family during this period. Natale named Michael Ciancaglini, Steven Mazzone, George Borgesi, Gaetano "Tommy Horsehead" Scafidi and Martin "Marty" Angelina as Merlino's key associates and co-conspirators in the plan. Stanfa was aware of the divide in his family and tried to find a peaceful solution. He named Michael's older brother Joseph Jr. as his new underboss. Stanfa hoped that this would appease the Merlino faction and bring them under his banner. However, tensions escalated, and in 1991 another war for control of the Philadelphia family was underway. Merlino loyalists shot and incapacitated Joseph Ciancaglini Jr., while Stanfa's faction killed Michael Ciancaglini. They continued attacking each other for months, including a freeway ambush Stanfa survived, and several failed attempts on Merlino's life. The Stanfa faction was still solidifying its control of the crime family and recruited many outside hitmen for the war.

On March 17, 1994, Stanfa and 23 of his men were arrested on racketeering-related charges. This was the second major indictment on the crime family in seven years. The federal case was the largest prosecution of an organized crime group in Philadelphia history. A key piece of evidence was two years of recorded conversations Stanfa would have with mobsters in his attorney's office and doctor's office. Believing attorney–client privilege and doctor-patient confidentiality would protect him, Stanfa openly talked about important Mafia business with his men. However, the FBI was able to get a warrant to place covert listening devices in both offices once they figured out they were being used to aid criminal conspiracies. Stanfa, in an unusual tactic, recruited several men who were of only partial Italian heritage, including the Veasey brothers. According to the former executive director of the Pennsylvania Crime Commission, Frederick T. Martens, "Stanfa brought in people, like the Veasey brothers, who had no background in the mob but who were willing to break legs and pull a trigger". John Veasey, who pleaded guilty to charges of racketeering and murder, entered the witness protection program in 1994. William Veasey, John Veasey's brother, was murdered on October 5, 1995, the same day he was scheduled to testify against Stanfa at trial.

Stanfa was convicted in 1995, and sentenced to life imprisonment in 1996. With most of Stanfa's supporters also arrested and convicted, Merlino was released from prison in November 1994 and named Natale, who had also been released from prison on parole, as the new boss. Merlino positioned himself as Natale's underboss. During Natale's reign, Merlino was the real power in the family, allowing Natale to become boss to direct law enforcement attention away from himself.

=== Natale's "front boss" reign, Merlino's ascension, and continuing Mafia violence ===
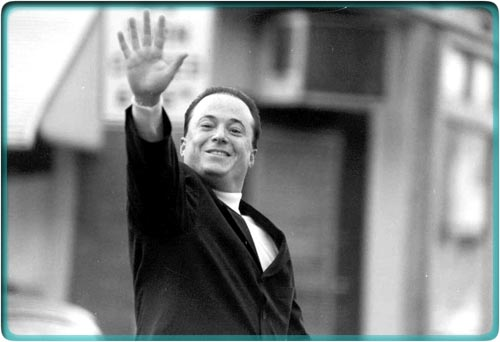
George Borgesi, a childhood friend of Joey Merlino and the nephew of Joseph Ligambi

Merlino gained notoriety as a flamboyant, celebrity gangster who often went out partying with a large entourage. The press dubbed him the "John Gotti of Passyunk Avenue" due to his candid demeanor in front of news cameras; Passyunk Avenue is a prominent street in South Philadelphia. He also invited the press when he held Christmas parties for the homeless and gave away turkeys at Thanksgiving in housing projects.

The arrogance and aggressiveness of Merlino's young faction turned off a lot of criminals from working with the crime family. Merlino would often make big bets with bookies and refuse to pay when he lost. This practice, known as "guzzling", was used on both independent and mob-run bookies. During this time, Merlino and Natale oversaw the crime family's gambling, loan sharking, extortion and stolen goods rackets.

In 1995, Louis Turra, leader of a Philadelphia drug gang, the 10th & Oregon Crew, was severely beaten by Merlino's men, allegedly for failing to pay a Mafia street tax on the gang's illegal earnings. Angered by the beating, Turra sought vengeance. His father Anthony hosted a meeting at his house during which Anthony, Louis and his gang discussed killing Merlino. In January 1998, Louis Turra apparently hanged himself in a New York City jail while awaiting trial. In March 1998, Anthony Turra, on trial on charges of plotting to kill Merlino, was shot dead outside his home by a gunman in a black ski mask. He was shot twice as he left for the federal courthouse, where a jury was deliberating in the racketeering and drug case against him and four other men. "We consider this an organized crime assassination, a mob hit," Police Inspector Jerrold Kane said. Three years later, Merlino was put on trial for helping orchestrate the murder, but was acquitted.

By the late 1990s, Merlino dodged more than two dozen attempts on his life. Merlino was friends with Steve "Gorilla" Mondevergine, president of the Philadelphia chapter of the Pagan's Motorcycle Club. Merlino sometimes used the Pagans to help settle underworld disputes. The alliance between the Philadelphia Mafia and the Pagans prevented the Pagans' rivals, the Hells Angels, from expanding into Pagan territory in southeast Pennsylvania and New Jersey. During the 1990s, Merlino was also aligned with members of the Junior Black Mafia.

In June 1998, Natale was jailed for a parole violation; Merlino subsequently took control of the family and cut off support to the imprisoned boss. Angered by this, Natale offered to secretly record conversations with Merlino, but it was not until September 1999, when he was indicted for financing drug deals, that he formally struck a deal to cooperate. In doing so, Natale became the first sitting boss in the history of the American Mafia to become government informant.

Between 1999 and 2001, Merlino, along with his underboss Stephen Mazzone, his consigliere George Borgesi, Martin Angelina, John Ciancaglini and others were arrested and put on trial for racketeering, illegal gambling, loan sharking, extortion, murder and attempted murder. Natale testified against Merlino during his 2001 racketeering trial, but was unable to secure a conviction for the murders he claimed Merlino committed. On December 3, 2001, Merlino was however convicted of racketeering charges and given a 14-year prison sentence. Natale had admitted to committing eight murders and four attempted murders. In 2005, Natale was sentenced to 13 years imprisonment for drug dealing, racketeering and bribery. He was released in May 2011, and placed in witness protection.

=== The rise of Ligambi ===
In 1997, Joseph Ligambi was released from prison after he successfully appealed his murder conviction and was acquitted at retrial. After ten years in prison, Ligambi returned to a much different Mafia family that saw two violent regime changes and the family under the control of a group of young mobsters. Ligambi, who is Borgesi's uncle, was a Scarfo era soldier when he was imprisoned in 1987 and was also mentored by Merlino's father, Salvatore. After the arrest of Merlino, Borgesi and several others in 1999, Ligambi was chosen to take over as acting boss of the family. In 2001, Merlino was sentenced to 14 years in prison. After Ligambi took over, he remained in the shadows, rarely being mentioned in the media, while taking a much less "trigger-happy" approach to running the family.

Ligambi stabilized the crime family when he took over, maintained membership and restored relations with the New York families. His inner circle included longtime Philadelphia mobsters Joseph "Mousie" Massimino, Gaeton Lucibello, and Anthony Staino.

Ligambi was left to deal with the damage Merlino had done to the crime family's relationship with illegal bookmakers, who refused to do business with the Philadelphia Mafia because Merlino use to make huge bets, then never paid when he lost.

Operation Slapshot, the code name for an investigation into an illegal gambling ring, was made public in February 2006. National Hockey League (NHL) player Wayne Gretzky, his wife Janet, and Rick Tocchet, who was then an assistant coach for the Phoenix Coyotes NHL team, were among those investigated, along with other players, coaches, and team staff members. Press reports said the ring had ties to the Bruno-Scarfo crime family. Three people, including a former New Jersey state trooper, pled guilty to charges in the case.

By the mid-2000s, the family consisted of approximately 50 members, half of whom were incarcerated, in addition to almost 100 associates. During Ligambi's tenure, around a dozen "made men" were released from prison, filling the ranks. Many of these men had been young players who fell victim to the family's unstable history and are now middle-aged. He named Anthony Staino, his closest and most loyal associate, as his underboss. Under Ligambi's direction, the family was able to muscle in on several video poker gambling machine businesses in the Philadelphia area. In 2007, 23 people, including four members of the Philadelphia family, were charged with running an illegal sports betting operation out of a poker room at the Borgata Casino in Atlantic City. The illegal operation was run by the Philadelphia Mafia, who received much of the profits. The operation was accused of taking in $60 million in bets in a 20-month period. Most of those involved pleaded guilty and received sentences ranging from probation to five years.

Merlino was released from prison on March 15, 2011, and served out his three-year parole in Florida. In May 2011, Ligambi and 14 other members and associates of the crime family were indicted by the FBI on racketeering charges related to illegal gambling operations, video poker gambling machines and loan sharking. Seven of those indicted pleaded guilty to lesser charges. One became a government witness and seven went to trial in October 2012. In January 2014, two juries were hung on the racketeering charges, and Ligambi and Borgesi were acquitted and released.

=== Current status ===
Following Merlino's release from prison in 2011, the FBI and organized crime reporters believed he continued to run the Philadelphia-South Jersey Mafia. Merlino disputed this, claiming he retired from a life of crime. As of 2015, Merlino divided his time between south Florida and Philadelphia.

While the Philadelphia family's criminal operations have greatly reduced over the years, experts believe they have been able to quietly maintain power and stability, and the crime family remains one of the most active and powerful Italian-American Mafia families. In 2016, it was reported that some members were involved in Philadelphia's booming construction and home rehab industry. In January 2018, Merlino went on trial for racketeering, fraud and illegal gambling charges. After a trial ended in a hung jury, Merlino pleaded guilty to one illegal gambling charge and was sentenced to two years in prison.

In April 2018, four soldiers and associates in New Jersey were arrested on drug trafficking charges. They are accused of distributing large amounts of methamphetamine, heroin, fentanyl and marijuana. They eventually pleaded guilty and were given sentences between five and 15 years.

On November 23, 2020, 15 members and associates of the crime family were indicted on federal racketeering charges; among the defendants were reputed underboss Steven Mazzone and reputed capo Domenic Grande. The primary charges were illegal gambling, loansharking, drug trafficking, and extorting other criminals, including illegal sports betting operators and loan sharks. Interest rates charged on outstanding gambling debts were as high as 264%. After previously pleading guilty, underboss Steven Mazzone was sentenced to five years in prison on December 15, 2022.

In 2024, Merlino was reportedly "shelved" by the Philadelphia family, essentially suspending his membership and making his persona non grata after embarking on a career as a podcast host and sports betting tipster, and replaced as head of the crime family by George Borgesi.

== Historical leadership ==
=== Boss (official and acting) ===
- c.1911–1931 — Salvatore Sabella — retired, deceased in 1962
- 1931–1936 — John "Nazzone" Avena — murdered on August 17, 1936
- 1936–1946 — Giuseppe "Joseph Bruno" Dovi — died of natural causes in 1946.
- 1946–1958 — Giuseppe "Joseph" Ida — deported in 1958, deceased in 1960s–1970s
- 1958–1959 — Antonio "Mr. Miggs" Pollina — deposed by the Commission
- 1959–1980 — Angelo "The Gentle Don" Bruno — murdered on March 21, 1980
- 1980–1981 — Philip "the Chicken Man" Testa — murdered on March 15, 1981
- 1981–1990 — Nicodemo "Little Nicky" Scarfo Sr. — removed by the Commission, deceased in 2017
  - Acting 1981–1984 — Salvatore "Chuckie" Merlino — stepped down, Scarfo released from prison
  - Acting 1989–1990 — Anthony "Tony Buck" Piccolo – stepped down
- 1991–1995 — Giovanni "John" Stanfa — imprisoned for life
- 1995–1999 — Ralph Natale — mostly a front boss, arrested in 1998, turned informant in 1999
  - Acting 1995—1999 — Joseph "Skinny Joey" Merlino — acting/street boss
- 1999–2023 — Joseph "Skinny Joey" Merlino — arrested in 1999, released in 2011; deposed
  - Acting 1999–2014 — Joseph "Uncle Joe" Ligambi — indicted in May 2011, was acquitted in January 2014; stepped down and became consigliere
  - Acting 2019–2023 — George Borgesi — became boss
- 2023–2026 — George Borgesi — stepped down
- 2026–present — Michael "Mikey Lance" Lancelotti

=== Street boss ===
When the boss of a family is incapacitated due to imprisonment, his functions may be fulfilled by an "acting boss" or "street boss".

- 2011–2015 — Steven "Stevie" Mazzone — became underboss
- 2015–2023 — Michael "Mikey Lance" Lancelotti — became acting underboss

=== Underboss (official and acting) ===
- 1911–1931 — John "Nazzone" Avena — became boss
- 1931–1936 — Giuseppe "Joseph Bruno" Dovi — became boss, died 1946
- 1936–1946 — Giuseppe "Joseph" Ida — became boss
- 1946–1956 — Marco "Small Man" Reginelli - died 1956
- 1956–1957 — Dominick Oliveto — retired
- 1957–1958 — Antonio "Mr. Miggs" Pollina — became boss
- 1958–1970 — Ignazio "Natz" Denaro — died
- 1970–1980 — Philip "the Chicken Man" Testa — became boss
- 1980–1981 — Peter "Petey" Casella — deposed by Commission
- 1981–1986 — Salvatore "Chuckie" Merlino — demoted, deceased in 2012
  - Acting 1982–1984 — Salvatore "Salvie" Testa — murdered on September 14, 1984
- 1986–1989 — Philip "Crazy Phil" Leonetti — turned informant
- 1989–1990 — Pasquale "Patty Specs" Martirano — died
- 1992–1993 — Joseph "Joey Chang" Ciancaglini Jr. — shot and incapacitated
- 1993–1995 — Frank Martines — imprisoned for life
- 1995–1999 — Joseph "Skinny Joey" Merlino — became official boss
- 1999–2004 — Steven Mazzone — imprisoned in 2000
- 2004–2012 — Joseph "Mousie" Massimino — imprisoned June 2004 – 2010
  - Acting 2007–2010 — Martin "Marty" Angelina
  - Acting 2010–2011 — Anthony Staino
- 2012–2015 — John "Johnny Chang" Ciancaglini — stepped down
- 2015–present — Steven "Stevie" Mazzone — indicted on November 23, 2020, sentenced on December 15, 2022
  - Acting 2023–2026 – Michael "Mikey Lance" Lancelotti — became boss

=== Consigliere (official and acting) ===
- 1911–1931 — Giuseppe "Joseph Bruno" Dovi — became underboss
- 1931–1936 — Giuseppe "Joseph" Ida — became underboss
- 1936–1946 — Marco "Small Man" Reginelli — became underboss
- 1946–1977 — Giuseppe "Joe the Boss" Rugnetta - died 1977
- 1977–1980 — Antonio "Tony Bananas" Caponigro — murdered by Commission
- 1980–1981 — Nicodemo "Little Nicky" Scarfo Sr. — became boss
- 1981–1982 — Frank Monte — murdered
- 1982–1989 — Nicholas Piccolo - died 1989
  - Acting 1984–1987 — Anthony Piccolo
- 1989–1994 — Anthony "Tony Buck" Piccolo — imprisoned for life, deceased in 2004
- 1995–1996 — Ronald "Ronnie" Turchi — demoted, murdered in 1999
- 1996–1999 — Steven "Handsome Stevie" Mazzone — promoted to underboss
- 1999–2014 — George Borgesi — imprisoned in 2000, released 2014
  - Acting 2004–2012 — Gaeton "Gate" Lucibello — indicted 2012
- 2014–2025 — Joseph "Uncle Joe" Ligambi — stepped down
  - Acting 2024–2025 — Anthony Staino
- 2025–2026 — John "Johnny Chang" Ciancaglini — stepped down
- 2026–present — Joseph "Mousie" Massimino

== Current members ==
=== Administration ===
- Boss — Michael "Mikey Lance" Lancelotti — current boss of the family. Lancelotti is a longtime member of the Philadelphia family. On November 18, 2020, Lancelotti's was confirmed as the street boss after the Department of Justice provided the initials "M.L.". He took over as acting underboss after George Borgesi became the new boss. In late 2026, Lancelotti took over the boss position.
- Underboss — Steven "Stevie" Mazzone (born 1964) — current underboss of the family. On November 23, 2020, Mazzone was indicted along with capo Dominick Grande, his brother, soldier Salvatore Mazzone, and others on racketeering and gambling charges. On December 15, 2022, Mazzone was sentenced to serve five years in prison. He is scheduled to be released from federal custody on March 17, 2027.
- Consigliere — Joseph "Mousie" Massimino (born April 1950) — currently consigliere of the family. Massimino formerly served as underboss to Joey Merlino. In July 2013, Massimino was sentenced to 15 years in prison for extortion, loan sharking, and illegal gambling, with 3 years of supervised release and a fine of $5000. According to prosecutors, Massimino engaged in extorting "street tax" payments from bookmakers, using threats of violence against debtors to collect loanshark payments and he had forced the owners of a vending company to sell the portion of their business related to the operation of illegal video poker machines. Also according to prosecutors, Massimino ran an illegal electronic gambling device business and sports bookmaking business, providing video poker machines and other gambling devices for bars, restaurants, convenience stores, coffee shops, and other locations in Philadelphia. He was appointed consigliere in 2026.

=== Caporegimes ===
Philadelphia faction

- Martin A. "Marty" Angelina — capo operating in South Philadelphia. He was convicted of racketeering with Joey Merlino in 2001, and was sentenced to 78 months. In September 2012, he was sentenced to 57 months on racketeering, loansharking and illegal gambling charges.
- Domenic "Dom" Grande — capo operating from South Philadelphia, Atlantic City, and South Jersey, according to the U.S. Department of Justice. In November 2020, Grande was indicted along with underboss Steve Mazzone, soldier Salvatore Mazzone and others on racketeering and gambling charges.

South New Jersey faction

- Joseph "Joe G" Grande (born March 19, 1960) — capo operating in Atlantic City. Grande is the uncle of Dominic Grande. He was inducted into the Philadelphia family in November 1984. On November 3, 1986, Grande and eleven other mobsters were indicted by a New Jersey state grand jury on racketeering conspiracy charges. Grande heads a crew operating in the Atlantic City area and serves as the Philadelphia family's liaison to the Five Families of New York.
- Philip "Phil" Narducci — capo operating from South Philadelphia and South Jersey. He is the son of Frank Narducci Sr. and brother of Frank Narducci Jr., and a former member of Nicky Scarfo's crew. Narducci was inducted into the family in 1986. On April 10, 1987, Narducci was charged with attempted murder and aggravated assault in the August 1982 shooting of Joseph Salerno Sr., whose son had cooperated with authorities. He was released from prison in 2012 after serving 25 years for racketeering and murder. His conviction for the 1985 killing of Frank "Frankie Flowers" D'Alfonso was overturned on appeal and he was acquitted at a retrial. A wiretap overhead fellow associate Jimmy Gallo telling a debtor that Narducci killed "between 8 and 14 people". In 2019, Narducci was sentenced to 12 months' imprisonment, three years probation and to pay $48,000 in forfeiture and fines for an extortionate loan scheme. He was released in February 2020.

North New Jersey faction

- Joseph "Joe Scoops" Licata — capo operating from Newark, according to the United States Department of Justice. In 1994, he was sentenced to 14 years in prison after George Fresolone recorded secret conversations, and he was charged under major gambling operations in Newark. In 2013, a mistrial was declared, and Licata was acquitted of racketeering.

Boston faction

- Shawn Vetere — capo of the family's Boston faction. Vetere was born in January 1968 and was inducted into the family in 1998. Vetere reportedly dated the actress Charlize Theron while she filmed The Cider House Rules in New England in 1998. He was one of ten mobsters arrested on narcotics conspiracy charges by the FBI on June 28, 1999, due to the work of informant Ron Previte. On April 24, 2000, Vetere pleaded guilty to drug charges. He was released from prison in July 2006.

=== Soldiers ===
Philadelphia faction

- George "Georgie Boy" Borgesi — former boss. Borgesi is a nephew of Joseph Ligambi. He served as consigliere, according to the Department of Justice. On July 3, 2012, before his scheduled release from prison, Borgesi was charged with overseeing a loan sharking operation in Delaware County from his prison cell in North Carolina. He has a couple of other family members working as associates for the Philadelphia crime family. On January 24, 2014, Borgesi was released from prison. After his release from prison, Borgesi traveled to Rhode Island, forming an alliance with Patriarca family underboss Matthew Guglielmetti. He became acting boss of the family in August 2019. In 2023, Borgesi was promoted to official boss after Joey Merlino was deposed by the family. He stepped down in 2026.
- Damion Canalichio (born August 1969) — soldier in the crew of captain Marty Angelini. In July 2013, Canalichio was sentenced by former U.S. District Judge Eduardo C. Robreno to 11 years in prison with 3 years of supervised release and a $1000 fine, for loansharking and illegal gambling.
- John "Johnny Chang" Ciancaglini — former underboss and consigliere. On November 3, 1986, Ciancaglini and eleven other mobsters were indicted by a New Jersey state grand jury on racketeering conspiracy charges. He served as underboss between 2012 and 2015. In August 2024, Ciancaglini and his wife were involved in a fight with three other men at a restaurant. Ciancaglini pleaded guilty to a misdemeanor. He was promoted to consigliere in 2026.
- Nicholas "Nicky the Hat" Cimino (born June 1969) — soldier. In July 2008, Cimino was indicted for operating an illegal gambling operation in Delaware County. The Pennsylvania State Police alleged Cimino of involvement in loansharking, narcotics, fencing stolen property, bookmaking and illegal gambling, and also alleged that during December 23 through to December 29 in 2004, the operation alone supervised over $220,000 in bets. In February 2009, Cimino pleaded guilty and he was sentenced to over 1 year in prison.
- Eric Esposito (born August 1970) — soldier. In 2014, Esposito was convicted of operating an illegal gambling business at the "First Ward Republican Club", a private social club in South Philadelphia, and in May 2014, he was sentenced to over 2 years in prison, former U.S. District Judge Eduardo C. Robreno also ordered 3 years of supervised release and a fine of $4,000.
- Joseph "Uncle Joe" Ligambi — served as consigliere and longtime acting boss for boss Joey Merlino. Ligambi's position was confirmed on November 18, 2020, when the Department of Justice provided the initials "J.L." as the current consigliere for the Philadelphia crime family. In 2026, he stepped down as consigliere and was replaced by John Ciancaglini.
- Gaeton "Gate" Lucibello; also known as "The Big Guy" — former capo and acting consigliere. Lucibello was originally a Stanfa loyalist before defecting to the Merlino faction during the war in the 1990s. According to government witness Rosario Bellochi, Lucibello acted as the getaway driver on the attempted murder of former Stanfa soldier Biagio Adornetto at La Veranda Restaurant on December 30, 1992. He was indicted along with Stanfa and 21 others on March 17, 1994, on racketeering and attempted murder charges. Lucibello testified in his own defense on April 25, 1996, and became the only defendant in the Stanfa case to be acquitted on May 15, 1996.
- Salvatore "Sonny" Mazzone — brother of underboss Steve Mazzone. In November 2020, Mazzone was indicted along with his brother underboss Steve Mazzone, capo Dominick Grande and others on racketeering and gambling charges.
- Anthony Staino — former capo, according to the United States Department of Justice. He was charged with loansharking when Henry Scipione, a Philadelphia bookie who owed Staino $80,000, testified against Staino saying that he had threatened to put a bullet in his head. Staino became the acting consigliere in 2024 working under Ligambi.

South New Jersey faction

- Anthony Borgesi — soldier. Anthony Borgesi is the younger brother of George Borgesi and nephew of Joseph Ligambi. In 1994, he was charged along with Philip Ligambi for the assault on a mother and her 16-year-old son over a business deal. Borgesi was inducted into the family in October 2015.
- Vincent Filippelli (born October 1953) — soldier. It is believed Filippelli allegedly served as a bodyguard to former boss John Stanfa during the early 1990s. In November 2007, Filippelli was indicted for conspiracy to promote gambling, promoting gambling, possession of gambling records, possession of steroids and money laundering, as well as possession of prohibited weapons and devices, and possession of a weapon by a convicted felon. In March 2008, Filippelli was sentenced to 5 years in prison, with 3 years of supervised release and fine of $10,000, for interstate travel in aid of racketeering, as he admitted that he had traveled from New Jersey to Pennsylvania to threaten a man who he believed owed an illegal sports gambling debt, who happened to be an undercover New Jersey State Police detective.
- Salvatore "Sammy" Piccolo — soldier serving under captain Dom Grande. In November 2019, Piccolo was sentenced by former U.S. District Judge Robert B. Kugler to 12 1/2 years in prison with 5 years of supervised release and over $174,000 in restitution, for selling over 200 grams of crystal methamphetamine and for insurance fraud. According to prosecutors, Piccolo made 3 transactions of crystal methamphetamine to undercover FBI agents from between June 2017 and September 2017 worth over $11,000. Piccolo later admitted that in April 2014, he had robbed a pawn shop in Union County, Pennsylvania with an accomplice and netted approximately $60,000, and that he had also scammed an insurance company for $174,000. His release from FCI Butner is scheduled for November 2, 2027.

North New Jersey faction

- Vincent "Beeps" Centorino — soldier. Centorino and other high-profile Philadelphia crime family mobsters, including Nicky Scarfo Jr., were tapped by the FBI, and all pleaded guilty in 1994.
- Louis "Big Lou" Fazzini — Fazzini was identified as a soldier of the Philadelphia crime family in March 2025. He was born in January 1967. In February 2013, Fazzini was sentenced to over 4 years in prison with 3 years of supervised release for racketeering conspiracy involving illegal gambling and theft from an employee benefit plan, Fazzini pleaded guilty to operating an illegal sports bookmaking business and devised a fraudulent scheme to obtain health benefits.
- Joseph "Joey Electric" Servidio — soldier under North New Jersey captain Joe Licata. In October 2020, Servidio was sentenced by former U.S. District Judge Robert B. Kugler to 15 years in prison after he had pleaded guilty to distributing heroin, fentanyl and over 300 grams of crystal methamphetamine, from between May 2016 and March 2018. He was also charged in the 2020 Eastern District of Pennsylvania indictment along with Dominic Grande, Steven Mazzone, and others. His scheduled release date from FCI Elkton is December 23, 2029.

=== Imprisoned members ===
- Frank Martines Jr. — former underboss. Martines joined the Philadelphia family in 1990 and became a key member of John Stanfa's faction which feuded with the "Young Turks" led by Joey Merlino during the Third Philadelphia Mafia War of the early 1990s. After Joseph Ciancaglini Jr. was left paralyzed in a shooting in March 1993, Martines was promoted to underboss. As Stanfa's second-in-command, he organized a series of murders and attempted murders of members of Merlino's faction. On January 14, 1994, Martines and Vincent Pagano lured another Stanfa loyalist, John Veasey, to an apartment and tried to kill him after Veasey had begun cooperating with the FBI. After being shot three times by Martines, Veasey managed to wrestle a knife from Pagano and slash Martines in the eye before escaping his assailants. On March 17, 1994, Stanfa and his followers were arrested on federal racketeering charges stemming from the gang war. Martines was convicted on November 21, 1995. He was sentenced to life in prison. Martines is incarcerated at the Federal Correctional Institution, Milan, Michigan.
- Anthony Nicodemo — soldier serving under Philadelphia captain Dom Grande. Nicodemo was considered a prime suspect by the FBI in the murder of John Casasanto, who was gunned down in 2003. In November 2007, Nicodemo and Michael Lancellotti were arrested for operating an illegal sports betting business in Atlantic City worth $22 million during a two-year period. He was given a 4-year suspended sentence with a $10,000 fine. In December 2012, Nicodemo was arrested in connection with the murder of Gino DiPietro, a suspected informant who was murdered the day before Nicodemo's arrest. After being on trial for the DiPietro murder, a mistrial was declared in 2014. Nicodemo later pled guilty and was sentenced to 25-to-50 years in prison. He will be eligible for parole by 2038.
- Giovanni "John" Stanfa — former boss during the early 1990s. In March 1994, Stanfa and 23 other Philadelphia mob affiliates were indicted on 31 racketeering-related charges. In October 1995, Philadelphia family associate and informant John Veasey implicated Stanfa of ordering 2 murders, named Michael Ciancaglini and Felix Bochino, who both were shot to death in 1993. On October 5, 1995, John Veasey was scheduled to testify against Stanfa, his brother, 35 year old Billy Veasey, was shot and killed, the murder was believed to be ordered by Stanfa. In November 1995, Stanfa was convicted of murder, attempted murder, kidnapping and illegal gambling. In July 1996, Stanfa was sentenced to life in prison for racketeering, loansharking and murder.

=== Inactive members ===
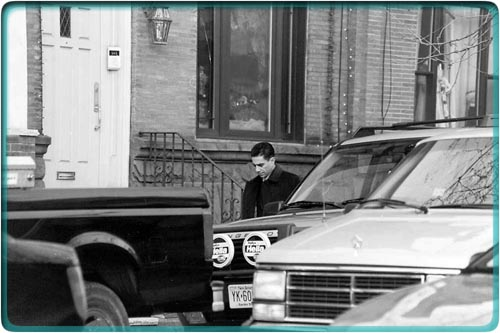
"Skinny Joey" Merlino in a government surveillance photo, c. 1995

- Joseph "Skinny Joey" Merlino — became boss in 1999, and is believed to have headed the Philadelphia crime family until 2024. In 2024, Merlino was "shelved" by the family, which deposed his leadership and suspended his membership, after establishing himself as a social media personality. Nonetheless, Merlino reportedly remains in the good graces of the family.
- Francis "Faffy" Iannarella Jr. (born April 27, 1947) — Iannarella was inducted into the Philadelphia family in January 1982. He was promoted to acting capo in November 1984, before being made official capo in February 1986. He served as a capo under former boss Nicky Scarfo. On November 3, 1986, Iannarella and eleven other mobsters were indicted by a New Jersey state grand jury on racketeering conspiracy charges. He was acquitted of federal drug charges on December 12, 1987. In November 1988, Iannarella was convicted of participating in 4 murders, 2 attempted murders and 7 murder conspiracies, along with illegal lottery numbers, debt collection and 9 extortion schemes, and he was given a 45-year prison sentence. He was released from prison in July 2016.
- Luigi Tripodi (born March or April 1938) — Tripodi was a former John Stanfa loyalist during the early 1990s, and was inducted into the Philadelphia crime family in 1991. As of 2026, Tripodi is considered as an inactive member of the Philadelphia Mafia.
- Anthony Pungitore — Born in November 1953. In November 1988, Pungitore was convicted of participating in 1 murder, 2 attempted murders and 3 conspiracies to commit murder, and in May 1989, he was sentenced to 30 years in prison, Pungitore was released from prison in 2006.

=== Associates ===
Philadelphia faction

- Victor "Big Vic" DeLuca — sentenced in 2022 to ten years in federal prison for racketeering conspiracy and conspiracy to distribute controlled substances. His release from FCI Lewisburg is scheduled for May 19, 2028.

South New Jersey faction

- Stephen Sharkey — sentenced to four years in federal prison in 2021 for wire fraud, aggravated identity theft, and money laundering.

== Former members ==
- Joseph A. Bellina — former soldier. Bellina was born on March 17, 1909. He was inducted into the Philadelphia family in January 1982.
- Felix "Tom Mix" Bocchino — former soldier. Bocchino was born on October 6, 1918. He was initially a member of the North Jersey faction of the Bruno family and was in the Newark crew headed by Antonio Caponigro during the 1960s and 1970s. His younger brother Richard was also a Mafia associate. Bocchino was allegedly among the conspirators in the March 1980 assassination of family boss Angelo Bruno. He was inducted as a "made" member of the family in January 1982. Bocchino was active in gambling, extortion, fraud and drug trafficking, and was released from prison in 1985 after serving a sentence for tax evasion. He became a close associate of John Stanfa, who was family boss in the early 1990s. After Bocchino began extorting South Philadelphia bookmaker Michael "Sheiky" Baldino, he became involved in a feud with Baldino's nephew Joey Merlino who, with the backing of Ralph Natale, headed a "Young Turks" faction which challenged Stanfa's reign. On January 29, 1992, Bocchino was shot dead, aged 73, in his Buick automobile outside his South Philadelphia home, making him the first victim of the Third Philadelphia Mafia War. After becoming a government witness in 1999, Natale pleaded guilty to ordering Bocchino's murder and named Steven Mazzone as the gunman in the killing.
- Angelo Bruno — former boss. Bruno was born in Sicily on May 21, 1910 and immigrated to the U.S. as a teenager, later becoming a member of the Philadelphia Mafia. Primarily due to his alliance with Carlo Gambino, boss of the Gambino family in New York, Bruno replaced Antonio Pollina as head of the Philadelphia family in 1959. Bruno led the Philadelphia family in a relatively peaceful and prosperous two-decade reign, during which the crime family dominated illegal gambling and loansharking in Philadelphia. When gambling was legalized in Atlantic City, New Jersey in 1976, he was involved in the construction of casinos in the city. However, Bruno's prohibition on his underlings partaking in narcotics trafficking resulted in a dissident faction forming in the Philadelphia Mafia led by underboss Philip Testa. In a plot orchestrated by consigliere Antonio Caponigro, who aspired to control the crime family, and carried out with the unofficial sanction of Genovese family in New York, Bruno was shot dead in a car outside his home in South Philadelphia, aged 69, on March 21, 1980.
- Antonio Rocco "Tony Bananas" Caponigro — former consigliere. Caponigro controlled the Philadelphia family's gambling and loansharking interests in Essex County, New Jersey. Disgruntled by a ban on drug trafficking imposed by boss Angelo Bruno, he aspired to lead the crime family. Exploiting tensions in the Philadelphia Mafia between Bruno and underboss Philip Testa, Caponigro received the unofficial sanction of the Genovese family in New York to contract Bruno's March 1980 murder. He was subsequently summoned to a meeting in New York with the bosses of the Five Families on April 17, 1980, where Caponigro was betrayed by Genovese boss Frank Tieri and ordered killed for having Bruno murdered without the authorization of the Commission. Caponigro was fatally beaten and shot, aged 67, allegedly by Joseph Sullivan. The following day, the bodies of Caponigro and Alfred Salerno, his brother-in-law and chauffeur, were each found in the trunk of an abandoned car in the Bronx.
- Fulvio A. Capozzi — former soldier. Capozzi was inducted into the Philadelphia family in 1981.
- Anthony Casella — former soldier. Casella was born on June 14, 1914. He was inducted into the Philadelphia family in June 1980.
- Peter F. "Petey" Casella — former underboss. Casella was born on August 28, 1907. He was one of eight members of a national heroin and opium ring convicted on narcotics conspiracy charges on July 3, 1958. Casella was sentenced on July 31, 1958 to forty years in federal prison. In prison, he was a cellmate of New York mobsters Vito Genovese and Carmine Galante. In 1973, Casella was paroled after serving more than 15 years of his sentence. As a Philadelphia Mafia capo, he was one of the few older members of the crime family who joined a dissident faction led by underboss Philip Testa against boss Angelo Bruno. When Testa was elevated to boss in April 1980 following Bruno's assassination, Casella was promoted to underboss. Casella conspired with capo Philip Narducci Sr. to take control of the Philadelphia family and, on Casella's orders, a hit team of Theodore DiPretoro, Rocco Marinucci and Michael Rinaldi killed Testa with a nail bomb at his home in March 1981. The plot failed to secure power for Casella, however, as the murder of Mafia boss Testa without the approval of the Commission led to the Philadelphia family hierarchy being summoned to meet with representatives of the Genovese family in New York. Casella confessed to his role in the conspiracy during the inquiry, was stripped of his rank, banished from the Mafia, and forced to flee to Florida. Nicodemo Scarfo was installed as boss in Philadelphia by the Commission. Casella died, aged 76, in Dade County, Florida on October 11, 1983.
- Joseph "Chickie" Ciancaglini Sr. — former capo. Ciancaglini was born on December 15, 1934. He was the father of John, Joseph Jr., and Michael Ciancaglini. In the late 1960s, Ciancaglini was involved with Teamsters Local 107, where he was an associate of Frank Sheeran. Ciancaglini, Sheeran and others were implicated in the murder of Robert DeGeorge, a union member who was running for office and planned to "clean up" the corrupt Local 107. Ciancaglini was inducted into the Philadelphia family in the early 1970s. He was a bodyguard and enforcer for Frank Sindone. Following Sindone's murder in 1980, Ciancaglini took over his major loansharking ring. He then also inherited the gambling rackets of Frank Narducci after his killing in 1982. By that point, Ciancaglini controlled the largest gambling and loansharking operation in Philadelphia. On February 21, 1981, Ciancaglini and nine other mobsters were indicted on federal racketeering charges relating to loansharking, fraud and illegal gambling. He was convicted under the RICO Act on May 7, 1982. Ciancaglini was sentenced on June 25, 1982 to ten years in prison. On January 11, 1988, he was indicted on fresh racketeering charges linked to extortion, gambling, conspiracy to distribute methamphetamine, murder and attempted murder. Ciancaglini was convicted on November 19, 1988 of RICO, RICO conspiracy and unlawful distribution of methamphetamine, and sentenced on May 10, 1989 to forty-five years' imprisonment.
- Michael "Mikey Chang" Ciancaglini — former soldier. Michael Ciancaglini was the son of Joseph Ciancaglini Sr., and younger brother of John and Joseph Ciancaglini Jr. Along with Joey Merlino, he was a leading member of the "Young Turks" faction which challenged the leadership of family boss John Stanfa during the early 1990s. After the Young Turks killed Stanfa loyalist Felix Bocchino in January 1992, Ciancaglini survived a retaliatory shotgun attack outside his home in South Philadelphia on March 3, 1992. During the ensuing Third Philadelphia Mafia War, one of Michael Ciancaglini brothers, Joseph Ciancaglini Jr., joined the Stanfa faction, while his father and other brother, John Ciancaglini, were imprisoned. In an effort to broker peace, Stanfa inducted Ciancaglini and Merlino into the family in the late summer of 1992. Stanfa's attempts at diplomacy proved futile, however, and the war continued, with Joseph Ciancaglini Jr. being left paralyzed by a shooting in March 1993. On August 5, 1993, Michael Ciancaglini and Merlino were shot by Stanfa faction gunmen Philip Colletti and John Veasey in a drive-by shooting outside the Young Turks' South Philadelphia clubhouse. Ciancaglini died from chest wounds, aged 31, while Merlino survived.
- Joseph "Joe Crutch" Curro — Curro first became noticed by law enforcement in 1976 overheard on a wiretap at the restaurant of caporegime Frank Sindone. He died of cancer in 2004.
- Anthony V. Ferrante — former soldier. Ferrante was born on October 8, 1920. He was inducted into the Philadelphia family in May 1982.
- Gerardo Fusella — former soldier. Fusella was born on June 7, 1916. He was inducted into the Philadelphia family in January 1982.
- Charles A. "Charlie White" Iannece — former soldier. Iannece was born on April 12, 1935. He was inducted into the Philadelphia family in November 1984. On April 10, 1987, Iannece was indicted on racketeering conspiracy charges. He was acquitted of federal drug charges on December 12, 1987.
- Carl Samuel "Pappy" Ippolito — former soldier. Ippolito was born on July 21, 1908. He oversaw the Philadelphia family's gambling rackets in Bucks County until Albert Pontani overtook the operation circa 1980. Ippolito was imprisoned for civil contempt after refusing to answer questions when he was subpoenaed to testify before the New Jersey State Commission of Investigation. On February 22, 1978, the Supreme Court of New Jersey upheld his right to refuse to testify because he had not been granted immunity from prosecution. Ippolito was one of ten mobsters indicted on February 21, 1981 on federal racketeering charges relating to loansharking, fraud and illegal gambling. He was later declared mentally incompetent to stand trial. Ippolito died on January 24, 1985, aged 76.
- Robert J. Lumio — former soldier. Lumio was born on August 24, 1937. He was inducted into the Philadelphia family in June 1980.
- Raymond "Long John" Martorano — former soldier. Martorano was inducted into the Philadelphia family in April 1981.
- Salvatore Joseph "Chuckie" Merlino — former underboss and acting boss. Merlino was born on June 29, 1939. He was the brother of Lawrence Merlino and father of Joey Merlino. Merlino was inducted into the Philadelphia family in June 1980. He was promoted to underboss in 1981 and served as acting boss during Nicodemo Scarfo's incarceration in 1984. In February 1986, Scarfo demoted Merlino to capo and replaced him with Philip Leonetti. On April 10, 1987, Merlino was indicted on racketeering conspiracy charges.
- Frank Monte — former consigliere. Monte was appointed consigliere of the Philadelphia family by Nicodemo Scarfo in 1981.
- Frank "Chickie" Narducci Sr. — former capo. Frank Narducci was the father of Philadelphia family members Philip and Frank Narducci Jr. He was an alleged gambling boss. Narducci and seven others were indicted in July 1980 on federal charges of racketeering, conspiracy, gambling and bribery. He was one of ten mobsters indicted on federal racketeering charges relating to loansharking, fraud and illegal gambling on February 21, 1981. Narducci and underboss Peter Casella were behind the March 1981 bombing murder of boss Philip Testa in a failed plot to take over the crime family. In April 1981, he was convicted of bribing two Philadelphia police officers for protection. Narducci was shot dead on January 8, 1982, aged 49, as he left his car near his home in South Philadelphia. He was denied a Roman Catholic funeral because his marriage to his wife, Adeline, was considered invalid by the church.
- Frank J. "Frankie Windows" Narducci Jr. — former soldier. Narducci was born on July 28, 1953. He was the son of Frank Narducci Sr. and brother of Philip Narducci. Narducci was inducted into the Philadelphia family in June 1980. He assumed control of Frank Narducci Sr.'s gambling, loansharking and narcotics distribution network after his father's January 1982 murder. In October 1982, Narducci was arrested for carrying a handgun registered to Henry Merlino. On April 10, 1987, Narducci was charged in a racketeering conspiracy indictment with attempted murder and aggravated assault for the August 1982 shooting of Joseph Salerno Sr. He was convicted in 1989 and was released from federal prison in 2009. Narducci died from liver failure on October 10, 2019, aged 66.
- Vincent "Al Pajamas" Pagano — Pagano was a capo under John Stanfa during the Merlino-Stanfa war. In January 1994, Pagano along with Frank Martines, was involved with the botched murder on FBI witness John Veasey. Veasey testified against Pagano and he was found guilty of racketeering in 1995 and was sentenced to life imprisonment. Pagano died of natural causes at the age of 89 in February 2019.
- Nicolo "Nicky Buck" Piccolo — former consigliere. Piccolo was born on October 10, 1905. He was inducted into the Philadelphia Mafia circa 1949. In 1982, Piccolo was appointed consigliere to his nephew, boss Nicodemo Scarfo. Piccolo died from emphysema at his home in Seaside Heights, New Jersey on February 14, 1989, aged 84.
- Antonio Domenico "Miggs" Pollina — former boss. Pollina was deposed as boss after placing a contract on one of his capos, Angelo Bruno, whose close links to Carlo Gambino allowed him to replace Pollina as head of the Philadelphia family. Despite learning of the assassination plot, Bruno spared Pollina's life.
- Albert Pontani — former soldier. Pontani was born on March 9, 1927. He was inducted into the Philadelphia family in January 1982.
- Anthony J. Pungitore — former soldier. Pungitore was born on February 9, 1921. He was inducted into the Philadelphia family in June 1980.
- Joseph A. Pungitore — former soldier. Pungitore was born on July 27, 1956. He was inducted into the Philadelphia family in January 1982. On November 3, 1986, Pungitore and eleven other mobsters were indicted by a New Jersey state grand jury on racketeering conspiracy charges.
- Michael Ricciardi Jr. — former soldier. Ricciardi was born on February 24, 1935. He was inducted into the Philadelphia family in January 1982.
- Enrico "Harry the Hunchback" Riccobene — former soldier. He was the half-brother of Mario Riccobene.
- Alfred Salerno — former soldier. Salerno was a member of the North Jersey faction of the Philadelphia family. He served as the chauffeur of his brother-in-law Antonio Caponigro. Following the March 1980 assassination of boss Angelo Bruno in a plot orchestrated by Caponigro, Salerno accompanied Caponigro to a meeting with the heads of the Five Families in New York on April 17, 1980 at which Salerno and Caponigro were murdered by the Genovese family for killing a Mafia boss without the authorization of the Commission. Salerno was tortured and shot to death, aged 64. His battered, nude corpse was found in the trunk of a car in the Bronx the following day, near to the body of Caponigro.
- Nicodemo Domenico "Little Nicky" Scarfo Sr. — former boss. Scarfo was born on March 8, 1929. He was inducted into the Philadelphia family in 1954 and mentored by capo Felix DiTullio. Scarfo served as head of the Philadelphia Mafia's operations in Atlantic City, New Jersey. He functioned as consigliere under Philip Testa. He then became boss of the crime family following the murder of Testa in March 1981. Between 1987 and 1989, Scarfo was convicted three times—for conspiracy, racketeering and first-degree murder, being sentenced to consecutive prison terms of 14 years, 55 years, and life, respectively, although the life sentence was later overturned. Scarfo died at the Federal Medical Center in Butner, North Carolina on January 13, 2017, aged 87.
- Joseph A. Sodano — former soldier. Sodano was born on April 22, 1937. He was inducted into the Philadelphia family in January 1982.
- Salvatore F. Sparacio — former soldier. Sparacio was inducted into the Philadelphia family in April 1981.
- Pasquale A. "Pat the Cat" Spirito — former soldier. Spirito was born on May 26, 1939. He was inducted into the Philadelphia family in January 1982.
- Gary Tavella — former soldier. On November 3, 1986, Tavella and eleven other mobsters were indicted by a New Jersey state grand jury on racketeering conspiracy charges.
- Philip Charles "the Chicken Man" Testa — former boss.
- Salvatore A. "Salvie" Testa — former capo. Testa was born on April 6, 1956. He was inducted into the Philadelphia family in June 1980.
- Nicholas V. "Nick the Blade" Virgilio — former soldier. Virgilio was born on October 12, 1927. He was a bookmaker, extortionist and hitman who operated in Philadelphia and Atlantic City. In 1952, he was sentenced to three-to-ten years in state prison after stabbing 19-year-old sailor Glenn Long to death during a bar fight in Philadelphia's red-light district. Virgilio became an associate of Nicky Scarfo in Atlantic City during the 1960s. In 1970, he pleaded no contest to killing bricklayer Robert Welsh. Despite Scarfo bribing Superior Court Judge Edwin Helfant with $12,500 to give Virgilio a light sentence, he was sentenced to twelve-to-fifteen years in state prison. After serving six years, Virgilio exacted revenge on Helfant. On February 15, 1978, a masked Virgilio shot Helfant five times in the face in front of his wife in the cocktail lounge of the Flamingo Hotel in Atlantic City. Scarfo drove the getaway car. Virgilio was inducted into the Philadelphia Mafia in May 1982 after Scarfo became boss of the family. Virgilio was indicted for Helfant's murder along with Scarfo in April 1987. In 1988, Virgilio was convicted on RICO charges and sentenced to forty years in federal prison. He was imprisoned at the United States Penitentiary in Lompoc, California from 1990 until he was sent to the United States Medical Center for Federal Prisoners in Springfield, Missouri for heart treatment on February 18, 1994. Virgilio died there from a heart attack on March 15, 1995, aged 67.

== Former associates ==
- Steven "Stevey" Alexander — former associate. Alexander was a former Philadelphia police officer who became involved in the production of methamphetamine for various drug rings, including the Warlocks Motorcycle Club. He was allegedly among the killers of Frank Stillitano, an "outlaw" Trenton, New Jersey gangster who was murdered in February 1981 at the request of the Gambino family. Alexander disappeared in April 1998. His severed arm was later found in a trash bin in Trenton.
- Joseph "Bongi" Bongiovanni — former associate. Bongiovanni was a former Philadelphia police officer. On February 21, 1981, Bongiovanni, along with nine others, was indicted on federal racketeering charges relating to loansharking, fraud and illegal gambling. He was convicted under the RICO Act on May 7, 1982. Bongiovanni was sentenced on June 25, 1982 to two and a half years in prison.
- Gary Iaconelli — former associate. On November 3, 1986, Iaconelli and eleven other mobsters were indicted by a New Jersey state grand jury on racketeering conspiracy charges.
- Frank Palumbo — former associate. Palumbo was a power broker, political fixer and owner of Palumbo's restaurant, which served as a meeting place for Philadelphia mobsters. He died on February 12, 1983, aged 71.
- Ralph Staino — former associate. Staino was one of twelve mobster indicted by a New Jersey state grand jury on racketeering conspiracy charges on November 3, 1986.
- Charles "Noodle" Warrington — former associate. Warrington was one of ten mobsters indicted on February 21, 1981 on federal racketeering charges relating to loansharking, fraud and illegal gambling. On May 7, 1982, he was convicted under the RICO Act. Warrington was sentenced to ten years in prison on June 25, 1982.

== Government informants and witnesses ==
- Biagio Adornetto – former soldier. He survived a failed assassination attempt on his life as friend and fellow Philly mob soldier, Rosario Bellocchi, loaded the shotgun with the wrong size of bullets; Adornetto was accused of flirting with John Stanfa's niece.
- Peter R. "Pete the Crumb" Caprio — former capo. Caprio was born on August 29, 1929. He was inducted into the Philadelphia family in 1981. In July 2000, he admitted to conspiring to commit murder, extortion and other crimes. During the case, he was accused of participating in the murder of William Gantz in 1994 and Joseph Sodano in 1996. Caprio testified against the absent Genovese crime family captain Lawrence Ricci in October 2005, who was murdered a few weeks before his trial.
- Nicholas F. "Nicky Crow" Caramandi – former hitman and soldier. Caramandi was born on May 20, 1935. He was inducted into the Philadelphia family in November 1984. In 1986, Caramandi alongside Robert Rego and former Democratic-Pennsylvania House of Representatives member, Leland Beloff, attempted to extort $1 million from real estate developer Willard Rouse, for funding revolved around the construction of Penn's Landing in Philadelphia. As a result of the 1984 slaying of Philadelphia captain Salvatore Testa, Caramandi, Joseph Grande and Charles Iannece were inducted into the Philadelphia family. After he received a message from Philadelphia crime family member Raymond Martorano while in prison, who alleged boss Nicky Scarfo was planning to have him murdered, and facing over 20 years in prison, Caramandi agreed to become a government witness.
- Rosario Conti Bellocchi – former soldier and hitman. He was engaged to John Stanfa's niece. Along with fellow Philadelphia mob soldier, Biagio Adornetto, he departed Sicily to work for Stanfa.
- Philip Colletti – former soldier. He was part of the Stanfa faction. According to Colletti, he created a remote-control bomb which was planted under Joey Merlino's car in 1993 and failed to detonate multiple times. His wife testified that Colletti and his wife participated in the disposing of a car which was used in a mob hit, the death of Michael Ciancaglini and wounding of Merlino, and fellow Philadelphia mob member and informer John Veasey testified that Colletti was with him when the shooting took place.
- Thomas Andrew "Tommy Del" DelGiorno – former capo. DelGiorno was born on September 23, 1940. He first became active with the Philadelphia family around 1964 and had gotten involved in the bookmaking business. DelGiorno was inducted into the crime family in January 1982. He was promoted to acting capo in November 1984, before being made official capo in February 1986. On November 3, 1986, DelGiorno and eleven other mobsters were indicted by a New Jersey state grand jury on racketeering conspiracy charges. He subsequently began cooperating with authorities. DelGiorno admitted to his participation in five murders. He testified against boss Nicky Scarfo and 16 other Philadelphia mobsters in November 1988.
- Salvatore W. "Wayne" Grande — former soldier. Grande was born on September 30, 1953. He was inducted into the Philadelphia family in June 1980. On September 14, 1984, he shot and killed capo Salvatore Testa, the son of Phil Testa, who became boss of the Philadelphia mob for a brief period and who also inducted Grande four years earlier. According to former Philadelphia crime family underboss and government witness Phil Leonetti, Grande repeatedly attempted to murder Harry Riccobene but failed, an enemy of the Scarfo faction, including an incident where Riccobene managed to survive 5 gunshot wounds to his face. On November 3, 1986, Grande and eleven other mobsters were indicted by a New Jersey state grand jury on racketeering conspiracy charges. In 1988, he was convicted on federal racketeering charges and informed on American Mafia mobsters later on during his imprisonment. Some of his relatives remain in the mob, including his son, who was allegedly inducted in 2011.
- George Fresolone – former soldier. During his imprisonment for illegal gambling and loansharking, Fresolone became an informant for the New Jersey State police in 1988. He recorded more than 400 conversations and his information was responsible for the indictment of nearly 40 mobsters. He wore a wire during his ceremony in July 1990 to become an official member of the Philadelphia mob. He died in 2002.
- Philip Michael "Crazy Phil" Leonetti – former underboss and nephew of former Philadelphia family boss Nicky Scarfo. He participated in his first murder at the age of 10 and helped Scarfo dispose of a corpse, a man Scarfo killed with an ice pick in a New Jersey bar for disrespecting him, the young Leonetti was used as a decoy. The first person he killed was a drug user named Louie DeMarco in 1976 on orders of boss Angelo Bruno. In 1978, he shot Vincent Falcone twice and killed him, which prompted associate Joe Salerno to become a government witness. He was inducted into the Philadelphia mob as a soldier in June 1980, and elevated to capo in May or June 1981. In February 1986, Leonetti was promoted to underboss. Leonetti was sentenced to 45 years in prison in 1987. He decided to become a government witness in 1989. Leonetti admitted to being the trigger man in 2 murders and participated in 8 separate murders. He was scheduled to testify against Gambino crime family boss John Gotti on January 21, 1992, however Gambino underboss Sammy "the Bull" Gravano agreed to testify instead. In May 1992, former federal judge Franklin Van Antwerpen reduced Leonetti's sentence to 6-years imprisonment. He testified against Genovese crime family boss Vincent Gigante in 1997 and claimed Gigante ordered 6 murder contracts as retaliation for murdering Philadelphia bosses Angelo Bruno and Phil Testa without approval from the other crime families, specifically in New York. He released a book about his life in 2012.
- Robert "Boston Bob" Luisi Jr. – former capo under Joey Merlino. Originally an associate of the Patriarca crime family, he joined the Philadelphia mob and became inducted in 1998. On November 6, 1995, his father, cousin, brother and family friend were killed by gunman Anthony Clemente who fired 13 shots inside of a Charlestown restaurant. It is noted that he attempted to seize control of the criminal rackets of Whitey Bulger in Boston during the 1990s, and attempted to meet Kevin Weeks in 1998. He was indicted by the FBI on June 28, 1999, alongside 13 others for conspiracy to acquire and distribute cocaine. In 2000, he admitted to the murder of Anthony DiPrizio in 1997. He later became a pastor and relocated to Tennessee using the alias Alonso Esposito.
- Lawerence "Yogi" Merlino – former capo. Merlino was born on June 18, 1946. He was the brother of Chuckie Merlino and uncle to Joey Merlino. Merlino was inducted into the Philadelphia family in June 1980. He was involved in cocaine distribution and was implicated in seven murders. In December 1979, Merlino, Nicodemo Scarfo and Philip Leonetti were arrested for the murder of Vincent Falcone. The trio were acquitted. Merlino and his brother owned Nat-Nat, Inc., in which Scarfo also held an interest. Due to his ownership of a construction company based in Atlantic City, Merlino relatives have been repeatedly denied a gaming license by the New Jersey Casino Control Commission since 1989. Merlino was promoted to capo in January 1982. On April 10, 1987, Merlino was indicted on racketeering conspiracy charges. In 1989, he agreed to become an informer and pleaded guilty to federal racketeering charges and to a murder charge. He died in 2001.
- Eugene C. "Gino" Milano – former soldier and hitman. Milano was born on July 26, 1959. In 1981, he and capo Salvatore Testa allegedly beat up Frank D'Alfonso, on orders of Scarfo. Milano was inducted into the Philadelphia family in January 1982. In January 1988, he was indicted on murder, attempted murder, extortion, gambling and conspiracy to distribute narcotic charges, alongside boss Nicky Scarfo and 18 others. Milano became a government witness in early 1989 and admitted to participation in the murder of Frank D'Alfonso on July 23, 1985. It is noted that he has testified against his younger brother. In 1990, he was sentenced to 15 years in prison, however in 1993, his sentence was reduced to 9-years imprisonment.
- Ralph Natale – former boss between 1994 and 1998. Natale was inducted by Joey Merlino while in prison in 1994 however he later claimed that he became a member under Angelo Bruno. He reached out to the FBI in the summer of 1998 while imprisoned on parole violations however a deal was worked out in 1999 after facing a charge of conspiracy to manufacture and distribute methamphetamine's in Philadelphia and New Jersey, alongside Joey Merlino. In 2000, he pleaded guilty to illegal gambling, extortion and drug distribution charges, including participating in 7 murders. He also admitted to handing bribes of around $50,000 to Milton Milan, the Democratic 45th mayor of Camden, New Jersey. He was interviewed by Trevor McDonald in 2015 and released a book about his mob life in 2017.
- Ron Previte – former capo. Previte was a Philadelphia Police Department officer for over a decade and was forced to resign around 1979. He became a bouncer in an Atlantic City casino shortly after. In 1985, he was arrested on theft charges and agreed to become an informer for the New Jersey state police. By 1993, he was a soldier in John Stanfa's Philadelphia crime family, and although he wasn't formally inducted, Stanfa allegedly told Previte to consider himself as a made man. He became an informer in 1997 and agreed to wear a wire for the FBI, he was also paid over $700,000 for information during his time as an informant. His cooperation, in part, led to former boss Ralph Natale's decision to cooperate in 1999. His testimony and cooperation has brought down at least 50 Philadelphia crime family members and associates. He died in August 2017 at the age of 73.
- Mario "Sonny" Riccobene — former associate. He was the half-brother of Harry Riccobene.
- Gaetano "Tommy Horsehead" Scafidi – former soldier. By 1986, he was a money runner for boss Nicky Scarfo, collecting and delivering money payments each week on behalf of Scarfo. His brother, Tori Scafidi, was also a soldier in the Philly crime family and was inducted in 1986. He joined the Merlino faction during the Philadelphia mob war in the 1990s, who opposed new boss John Stanfa. However he switched sides and was shortly after inducted into the crime family by Stanfa. In 1993, two gunmen attempted to kill him however the bullet shattered his car mirror. He became an informer in 2000.
- Joseph "Joe" Salerno Jr. – Salerno testified against Nicodemo Scarfo, Philip Leonetti and Lawrence Merlino in the 1980 murder trial in which they were acquitted of killing Vincent Falcone. In retaliation for his testimony, Scarfo ordered the shooting of Salerno's father, Joseph Salerno Sr., who survived being shot by Frank and Philip Narducci in Wildwood Crest, New Jersey in August 1982.
- John Veasey – former associate and hitman. He was part of the Stanfa faction during the Philadelphia mob war from 1992 to 1994. In August 1993, Veasey shot and killed Michael "Mikey Chang" Ciancaglini during a drive-by shooting, and wounded Joey Merlino with 4 gunshot wounds. In September 1993, he shot and killed Frank Baldino Sr. outside of the Melrose Diner in South Philadelphia. He alleged that Stanfa became withdrawn after Veasey's complaints and ordered a contract on him. On January 14, 1994, he was lured to a second-floor apartment and noted that the room was covered in plastic, the hitmen alleged that they were "painting". Moments after, he was shot 3 times in the head and once in the chest. Veasey managed to stab one of the attackers and hit the other one, eventually fleeing the apartment. In January 1994, he became a government witness. On the day of John Stanfa's trial in October 1995 which Veasey was scheduled to testify at, his brother, William "Bill" Veasey, was murdered. He was sent to prison in the mid-1990s and was released in 2005. He released a book about his life in January 2012.

== Factions and territories ==
The Philadelphia family operates primarily in South Philadelphia and the surrounding metropolitan area, including Delaware and New Jersey. The organization's principal criminal activities include labor racketeering, political corruption, sports and numbers betting, video gambling, extortion, loansharking, manufacture and distribution of drugs, money laundering, mail fraud, prostitution, theft, and hijacking.

- Pennsylvania — The family is based in South Philadelphia and operates throughout Southeastern Pennsylvania.
- New Jersey — The family has long operated in Atlantic City and throughout South Jersey, including Ocean City, Margate, Wildwood and Camden. The organization's influence in Atlantic City has waned in recent decades, however. The family also has a significant North Jersey faction based in the Down Neck neighborhood of Newark. Additionally, the organization operates in Trenton and along the Jersey Shore.
- Delaware — The family has a small contingent operating in Delaware.
- New York — The family conducts gambling operations in New York City.
- Florida — The family operates in South Florida's Palm Beach and Broward counties,, including in Fort Lauderdale.

== List of murders committed by the Philadelphia crime family ==
| Name | Date | Reason |
|---|---|---|
| Leo Lanzetta | August 22, 1925 | It is believed Lanzetta was killed as the retaliation for the unsanctioned murder of Joe Bruno, a Sicilian-born soldier for the Philadelphia Mafia. It is believed the boss of the Philadelphia family, Salvatore Sabella, ordered the murder of Lanzetta, and Lanzetta was shot and killed by five masked gunmen as he was leaving a barber shop located on 7th and Bainbridge Street in South Philadelphia. |
| Joseph Zanghi and Vincent Cocozza | May 30, 1927 | Zanghi and Cocozza were shot and killed in a drive-by shooting located on a street corner outside of the Cafe Calabria at 824 South 8th Street in Philadelphia, Pennsylvania. It is believed both men were accidentally killed with the intended target being Anthony Zanghi as Zenghi was involved in a dispute with Salvatore Sabella, the boss of the Philadelphia family at the time. Antonio Pollina, Joseph Scopoletti, Dominick Festa, Luigi Quaranta and John Avena were reputedly involved in the Zanghi-Cocozza murders. |
| Joseph Maggio & Ann Maggio | June 30, 1934 | Michael Maggio shot and killed his wife, Ann Maggio, and Joseph Maggio, his 21-year-old son, as the pair were caught in bed together, Michael Maggio was later sentenced to 5 years in prison. |
| Pius Lanzetta | December 31, 1936 | 37-year old Lanzetta was shot and killed inside of a luncheonette located on 726 South Eighth Street in Philadelphia. It is believed Lanzetta was killed as retribution for the murder of Philadelphia family boss, John "Nazzone" Avena, in August 1936. Lanzetta and his five other brothers were allegedly involved in bootlegging, drug trafficking, prostitution, and illegal gambling. |
| William Hugo "Willie" Lanzetta | July 1-2, 1939 | 38-year old Lanzetta was shot in the head execution style, with his head chopped off and decapitated, his head and body were later found at the Wynnewood Estate, now commonly known as the Maybrook Mansion, in Wynnewood, Pennsylvania. |
| Anthony Minerva | July 13, 1948 | 22-year old Minerva was shot and killed by Angelo Bruno and Angelo Martel located at 1100 block of South 13th Street in Philadelphia, with Peter Casella whom orchestrated the murder, as Minerva had allegedly attempted to "steal" customers from within a local cheese factory and business. |
| Joseph Sadia | April 5, 1950 | Sadia was shot and killed by Angelo Bruno and Phil Testa with Frank Nicoletti who had served as the getaway driver, as Sadia was accused of spreading a false rumour regarding the wife of Nicoletti having an affair with Salvatore Sabella, the former boss of the Philadelphia family. |
| Marshall Veneziale | December 6, 1954 | Veneziale was associated with Peter Casella and Anthony Casella. In 1961, the FBI alleged that Carl Ippolito, Frank "Bumper" Pollastrelli and Michael "Daylight" Tramahtana were responsible for the murder of Veneziale, although it is believed James Gatto was the triggerman. Veneziale was possibly killed for refusing to share profits from his illegal alcohol bootlegging business. Veneziale was found in the trunk of a car belonging to his brother, Anthony Veneziale, in South Philadelphia. |
| Alphonse Lanatto | 1957 | Lanatto had reportedly negatively gossiped about affiliates of the Philadelphia family, and he was allegedly murdered by Angelo Bruno, Phil Testa and Frank Nicoletti. |
| Dominick "Red" Caruso | January 30, 1962 | Caruso was killed for assaulting and attempting to extort Joseph "Joe the Boss" Rugnetta, whom was the consigliere of the Philadelphia family at the time. |
| William Dugan | May 26, 1963 | 24-year old Dugan was stabbed by Nicky Scarfo inside of a diner located on 3rd Street and Oregon Avenue in South Philadelphia, reportedly over a quarrel of who was to sit at a booth. Dugan was choking Scarfo when Scarfo managed to grab a butter knife and plunged the knife into Dugan's chest. |
| Ferdinand "Blackie" Iacono | August 7, 1963 | 47-year old Iacono was strangled to death by Philadelphia family capo Santo Idone as Iacono refused to share profits from his illegal gambling racket with Idone. The body of Iacono was found near a coal pit in Hazleton, Pennsylvania. |
| Robert DeGeorge | August 17, 1967 | DeGeorge, in his mid 30s, was shot once in the back and killed by Joseph Ciancaglini, as DeGeorge was willing to implicate Ciancaglini and union agent Francis "Frank" Sheeran in union corruption within the Local 107 in Philadelphia. |
| George Feeney | 1970 | Philly mob associate Feeney allegedly insulted Angelo Bruno and Ralph Natale, though it has been alleged Natale was seeking to seize control of the Local 170 Teamster union which Feeney controlled. Feeney was shot to death. |
| Dominick Anthony Luciano | February 12, 1971 | 47-year old Luciano was shot and killed in the driveway of his home located in the Pitcairn Park section of Roseland, New Jersey, by members of the Campisi gang as Angelo Bruno authorized the murder, due to Luciano having an affair with one of the Campisi brother's. |
| Pasquale "Jimmy Ross" Procopio | 1972 | Philly mob associate, unknown why he was killed. |
| Joseph McGreal | December 27, 1973 | 37-year old McGreal was the organizer for Teamsters Local 107. McGreal was shot 3 times in the head and killed by Ralph Natale following a union power struggle. The body of McGreal was found inside of a car on the White Horse Pike in Chesilhurst, New Jersey. |
| Alvin Feldman | 1974 | Joseph Ciancaglini stabbed Jewish mobster Alvin Feldman to death with an ice pick, after Feldman made threats that he was going to kill Nicky Scarfo. The murder was allegedly authorized by Angelo Bruno. Frank Narducci, Santo Idone and Joseph Scalleat were also part of the hit team. |
| Albert Meglio and Michael White | January 13, 1975 | 39-year old Meglio and 18-year old White, an employee of the Valley Bowl in Montclair, New Jersey, were kidnapped and murdered. It is believed Meglio was shot and killed by Antonino Caponigro, also involved were Gerardo "Jerry" Fusella, William "Billy Blonde" Layton and Giuseppe "Happy" Bellina. The bodies of Meglio and White were dumped into a landfill in Newark, New Jersey. |
| Edward "Butch" Snee | July 30, 1975 | Snee was killed for being a suspected informer. |
| Louis "Louie" DeMarco | 1976 | DeMarco was a drug user and was ordered killed by Angelo Bruno for robbing several illegal mob-run gambling houses. Phil Leonetti shot DeMarco 5 times. According to Leonetti, DeMarco was his first victim. |
| Edwin Helfant | February 15, 1978 | 50-year old Helfant, a former lawyer and retired municipal judge, was killed on orders of Nicky Scarfo after he refused to accept a bribe of the amount of $12,500 during the early 1970s in return for a short prison sentence for Scarfo's associate, Nicholas "Nick the Blade" Virgilio, however Helfant instead sentenced Virgilio to between 12 and 15 years in prison. Virgilio was released from parole in 1978 and later confronted Helfant at the Flamingo Motel on Pacific Avenue in Atlantic City, New Jersey, shooting Virgilio between 4 and 5 times, effectively killing him. |
| Vincent Falcone | December 16, 1979 | 30-year old Falcone was a South Jersey cement contractor. Falcone was shot once in the head and once in the chest by former Philadelphia family underboss and later witness, Phil Leonetti. It is believed Falcone was killed for insulting Nicky Scarfo. |
| Angelo Bruno | March 12, 1980 | 69-year old Bruno led the Philadelphia family from 1959 until 1980. Bruno was known as "The Gentle Don" due to his preference for conciliation over violence. Bruno was shot once in the head by a shotgun blast outside of his home located near the intersection of 10th Street at 934 Snyder Avenue. Bruno's murder was ordered by Antonio Caponigro, his consigliere, and Caponigro was later murdered for the unsanctioned murder in April 1980. It is believed Bruno was murdered for a combination of reasons including the ban of narcotics trafficking which several members hoped to get involved with if Bruno was eliminated, disputes over illegal gambling revenue shares, and with leaving members dissatisfied claiming that Bruno was too passive during his reign, preferring diplomacy and negotiation over aggressive criminal expansion. John Stanfa, who challenged with Joey Merlino during the 1990s Mob war, was later reportedly responsible for setting up Bruno according to authorities by December 1980. |
| Edward Bianculli | May 19, 1980 | Philly mob associate murdered by Theodore DiPretoro, unknown why he was murdered. |
| Frank "Barracuda Frank" Sindone | October 29, 1980 | 53-year old Sindone was found murdered in an alley in South Philadelphia, shot 3 times in the head, as Sindone helped plot the March 1980 unsanctioned murder of Angelo Bruno, the former boss of the Philadelphia family. |
| John McCullough | December 16, 1980 | 60-year old McCullough was the President of the Roofer's Union Local 30 in Philadelphia. McCullough was shot 6 times in the head and killed at his home in Bustleton of northeast Philadelphia in Pennsylvania by an assailant posing as a delivery man carrying flowers after he was reportedly expelled and warned to "stay out of Atlantic city" by organized crime leaders in South Jersey. |
| Phil "The Chicken Man" Testa | March 15, 1981 | 56-year old Testa served as the underboss to Angelo Bruno from 1970 until 1980, and succeeded Bruno for almost one year before Testa was killed by a nail bomb which exploded beneath the front porch of his home located on 2117 W. Porter Street in South Philadelphia. It is believed at least four perpetrators were involved in his murder with capo Frank Narducci being shot and killed in January 1982 whom orchestrated the murder, and Rocco Marinucci was also shot and killed in March 1982 and held responsible for planting and detonating the bomb, Peter Casella also engineered the Testa murder and fled to Florida where he died of natural causes in 1984, and 23-year old Theodore DiPretoro whom had built the bomb was sentenced to life in prison in November 1983 for the Testa murder. |
| Harry Peetros | May 26, 1981 | 53-year old Peetros was a high-ranking member of the Philadelphia Greek Mob. Peetros was found in the trunk of his 1979 Cadillac vehicle, shot multiple times, located in Upper Darby's East Lansdowne section in Pennsylvania, by two Scarfo gunmen as he had refused to pay street tax to Nicky Scarfo. |
| Chelsais Bouras | May 27, 1981 | 50-year old Bouras, the leader of the Philadelphia Greek Mob, and his 54-year old girlfriend, Jeannette Curro, were shot and killed, with Bouras shot 3 times in the head inside of a Greek restaurant in South Philadelphia by two masked Scarfo gunmen for refusing to pay street tax to Nicky Scarfo. |
| John Calabrese | October 6, 1981 | 45-year old Calabrese, an associate of the Philadelphia family, was primarily active in drug dealing and loansharking. Calabrese was murdered for refusing to pay street tax to the Philadelphia family headed by Nicky Scarfo. |
| Frank "Chickie" Narducci | January 7, 1982 | 48-year old Narducci, a capo in the Philadelphia family at the time of his death, was shot 10 times and killed allegedly by Salvatore Testa, the son of former Philadelphia family boss, Phil Testa, outside of his home in South Philadelphia. Narducci was killed for his involvement in the March 1981 murder of Phil Testa. |
| Vincent "Tippy" Panetta | February 4, 1982 | 59-year old Panetta, and his 19-year old girlfriend, Michelle A. Podraza, were murdered and found inside of an apartment located on Township Line Road in Cheltenham, Pennsylvania. Panetta was beaten and then strangled to death with a lamp cord, while his girlfriend died from suffocation. Panetta was reportedly heavily active in illegal gambling and loansharking. Panetta may have had been murdered due to his association with capo Frank "The Barracuda" Sindone, whom was previously murdered in October 1980 for his involvement in the unsanctioned murder of former Philadelphia family boss, Angelo Bruno. |
| Dominick "Mickey Diamond" DeVito | February 22, 1982 | 50-year old DeVito, a soldier for the Philadelphia family, was found inside of the trunk of his Cadillac vehicle in a street in South Philadelphia, hogtied and shot 3 times in the head. DeVito was killed for his rivalry towards Nicky Scarfo. |
| Rocco Marinucci | March 15, 1982 | 30-year old Marinucci served as a driver and bodyguard to Pete Casella, the underboss of the Philadelphia family during the early 1980s. Marinucci was shot 5 times in the chest, neck and mouth, he was also found with firecrackers in his mouth located at a South Philadelphia parking lot on Federal Street in the Southwark neighborhood. It is believed Marinucci was killed for planting and detonating the bomb which killed Phil Testa in March 1981, the successor of Angelo Bruno as boss of the Philadelphia family. |
| Frank Monte | May 13, 1982 | 50-year old Monte was the consigliere of the Philadelphia family at the time of his death. It is believed the murder of Monte was ordered by Harry Riccobene, before he formed a dissent faction in around August 1982 that opposed the rule of Nicky Scarfo whilst Scarfo was imprisoned in a Texas penitentiary for gun possession, as Monte refused to pay street tax to Scarfo. Monte was shot between 6 and 8 times by Joseph Pedulla in the head and neck located in the parking lot of a service station in Southwest Philadelphia by using a .22-caliber rifle, Pedulla later agreed to become a witness and became a chief prosecution witness during the 1984 trial of Harry Riccobene and his co-defendants. |
| Robert Hornickel | January 27, 1983 | 30-year old Hornickel, an associate of the Philadelphia family, was shot 3 times and killed by members of a crew headed by capo Joseph "Chickie" Ciancaglini as Hornickel was blamed for a botched drug deal. The body of Hornickel was found in the trunk of a car located near Philadelphia's Italian Market at Sixth and Bainbridge Street in Philadelphia. |
| Pat "Pat the Hat" Spirito | April 29, 1983 | 43-year old Spirito, a soldier in the Philadelphia family, was shot twice in the head inside of his car located on East Passyunk Crossing in South Philadelphia and killed as he had failed to murder Robert Riccobene, the brother of Harry "The Hunchback" Riccobene. |
| Samuel Tamburrino | November 3, 1983 | 35-year old Tamburrino was shot 16 times and killed by the rival Nicky Scarfo faction as Tamburrino was aligned with the Riccobene faction, located at his variety store in Southwest Philadelphia. |
| Robert "Bobby" Riccobene | December 6, 1983 | 43-year old Riccobene was shot in the head by a shotgun blast with Francis "Faffy" Iannarella involved in his murder, by the Nicky Scarfo faction, located at his mother's house in Southwest Philadelphia. |
| Salvatore "Salvie" Testa | September 14, 1984 | 28-year old Testa had been appointed as a capo at the time of his death by boss Nicky Scarfo. Testa is also the son of Phil "The Chicken Man" Testa, whom had briefly served as the boss of the Philadelphia family, succeeding Angelo "The Gentle Don" Bruno, following the murder of Bruno in March 1980, Testa himself was murdered at his home by a nail bomb in March 1981. It is believed Testa was ordered to be killed by Scarfo as Testa was gaining popularity, wealth and power, and Scarfo was paranoid and jealous that Testa may have had started a loyal following to become the boss of the Philadelphia family. According to the former Philadelphia family underboss and government witness, Phil Leonetti, Testa was murdered for breaking the engagement with the sister of Joey Merlino, Maria Merlino. Testa was lured to a candy store located on East Passyunk Avenue in South Philadelphia by Joseph Pungitore and was shot 2 times in the head and killed by Salvatore "Wayne" Grande, his body was found on a roadside in Gloucester Township, New Jersey. |
| Frank "J.R." Forlini | February 8, 1985 | 43-year old Forlini, an associate of the Philadelphia family, was shot several times and killed at the parking lot of the Delaware County K-Mart store. Forlini was marked for death by Nicky Scarfo in an attempt to take control of his illegal gambling operation. |
| Frank "Frankie Flowers" D'Alfonso | July 23, 1985 | D'Alfonso, in his 50s, an associate of the Philadelphia family, active since the Bruno-era, was shot around 5 times and killed by two gunmen, Nicholas Milano and Philip Narducci, located in South Philadelphia near the Italian Market. It is believed D'Alfonso was murdered for refusing to pay street tax to Nicky Scarfo, the boss of the Philadelphia family at the time. |
| Frankie Russo | February 28, 1987 | Russo, an associate of the Philadelphia family, was shot and killed in Bristol Township for stealing 15 gallons of P2P, the main ingredient in cooking crystal meth, from a drug trafficking operation headed by Scarfo-era capo, Albert "Reds" Potani. |
| Louis "Louie Irish" DeLuca | May 24, 1990 | 51-year old DeLuca, a soldier inducted during the Nicky Scarfo era of the Philadelphia family, was shot 4 times and killed after getting into an argument with the Joey Merlino faction. |
| Felix "Tom Mix" Bocchino | January 29, 1992 | Bocchino, a 73-year-old Bruno family soldier and close associate of boss John Stanfa, was shot in the head and neck as he started his car outside his South Philadelphia home. He was the first casualty in the Third Philadelphia Mafia War, in which a "Young Turks" faction led by Ralph Natale and Joey Merlino challenged Stanfa's leadership. |
| James "Jimmy Brooms" DiAddorio | May 20, 1992 | 55-year old DiAddorio, a Philadelphia family associate, Stanfa faction loyalist and former chief of the Delaware River Port Authority, was shot 6 times and killed by two men while speaking on the phone at Vulpine Athletic Club located on 12th and Federal Street in South Philadelphia for refusing to pay street tax from his bookmaking business and drug operations, and for negatively talking about Merlino and his crew in several local bars. According to the testimony of former Philadelphia family boss, Ralph Natale, DiAddorio was killed by Martin Angelina and Gaetano Scafidi. |
| Francesco DiGiacomo | November 29, 1992 | Philly mob associate and Stanfa crew loyalist. Shot and killed on Delaware Avenue in the Old City neighborhood of Philadelphia by Rosario Bellocchi for not repaying a debt to the Stanfa crew. |
| Billy Shear | 1993 | Philly mob associate based in North Jersey. Killed by Philip "Philly Fay" Casale in Newark, New Jersey for being a suspected police informer. |
| Rod Colombo | January 7, 1993 | 29-year old Philly/Los Angeles Mafia associate, shot 3 times in the back of his head in Audubon, New Jersey while sitting in his Cadillac car. |
| Louis "Gee Gee" Cappello | January 20, 1993 | Philly mob associate active in selling drugs and bookmaking. Cappello was killed for not paying street tax to John Stanfa. |
| Mario "Sonny" Riccobene | January 28, 1993 | Riccobene, a 60-year-old former Philadelphia family soldier and older brother of Harry Riccobene, had testified against the crime family in 1984 and entered the witness protection program. After being removed from the program and returning to South Philadelphia, Riccobene was ordered killed by the Stanfa faction. He was shot four times in the head outside of the Brooklawn Diner on 297 Crescent Boulevard in Brooklawn, Camden County, New Jersey. It is believed Mario "Sonny" Esposito, who became a soldier for the Philadelphia shortly after the Riccobene murder, was the shooter and . |
| Michael "Mikey Chang" Ciancaglini | August 5, 1993 | 30-year-old Philadelphia family soldier Ciancaglini was accompanied by Joey Merlino when they were fired upon in a 10-to-15-shot barrage by Stanfa faction gunmen Philip Colletti and John Veasey as they left a mob social club near 6th and Catharine Street in South Philadelphia. Ciancaglini died from gunshot wounds to the chest and lungs, while Merlino survived being shot in the buttocks. |
| Frank "Frankie Bronze" Baldino | September 17, 1993 | 46-year old Baldino was shot between 5 and 7 times in the head and torso and was killed outside of the Melrose Diner in South Philadelphia, by John Veasey. Frank Martines and Giuseppe Gallara accompanied Veasey in the drive-by shooting. Baldino was killed by the rival John Stanfa faction, as he was an affiliate of the Joey Merlino faction. |
| Nicasio Zagone | January 19, 1994 | Zagone was the nephew to boss John Stanfa and was killed as a case of mistaken identity. |
| William "Crazy Willie" Gantz | July 15/16, 1994 | 44-year old Gantz was a Philadelphia family associate who served as a driver and bodyguard to Joseph "Joe the Nodder" Sodano, the capo of the North Jersey crew. Gantz was shot once in the head and killed by the rival Joey Merlino faction. His body was discovered on Honiss Street, near North 8th Street in Newark, New Jersey at around 1:00 a.m. on the morning of July 16, 1994. |
| Michael "Mikey Ice" Brennan | December 6, 1994 | 38-year old Philadelphia family associate Brennan was shot once in the head after an alleged falling out with the Joey Merlino faction regarding the illegal drug and gambling business. The body of Brennan was reportedly wrapped in a carpet and dumped in a wooded area in Camden County, New Jersey. |
| Ralph Mazzuca | February 24, 1995 | Philly mob associate and South Philly drug dealer. Shot in the head and back in South Philly, hog-tied, and set on fire after he robbed two kilograms of cocaine from Joey Merlino's driver-turned government informer Roger Vella and tied up Vella's sister and dad at their home during the robbery in 1994. |
| Billy Veasey | October 5, 1995 | Philly mob associate and brother of John Veasey, 35-year old Veasey was shot four times and killed, allegedly by John "Johnny Chang" Ciancaglini, while exiting his South Philadelphia home on the morning his brother was set to testify against the Philadelphia crime family. |
| Michael "Dutchie" Avicolli | April 4, 1996 | 52-year old Avicolli was a bookmaker active in South Philadelphia and an associate of the Philadelphia family. According to the testimony of Ralph Natale, the former boss of the Philadelphia family during the late 1990s, Avicolli was shot and killed by Joey Merlino and Steven Mazzone, with the assistance of Genovese family associate, Stefano Mazzola, as Avicolli had an affair with the wife of Mazzone, and that Avicolli was buried in North Jersey. |
| Joseph "Joe the Nodder" Sodano | December 7, 1996 | Philly mob capo based in North New Jersey. Shot twice in his SUV in Newark, New Jersey by Philip Casale and Peter "Pete the Crumb" Caprio. Casale took Sodano's jewellery and $12,000 from the murdered man's wallet immediately after the hit. Sodano was allegedly killed for trust and loyalty concerns. |
| Robert Matonis | October 17, 1997 | Philly mob associate and drug dealer, killed by Philip Casale in Harrison, New Jersey. |
| Anthony Turra | March 18, 1998 | 61-year old Turra was shot twice and killed outside of his home located on South 20th Street near Passyunk Avenue in South Philadelphia while enroute to a racketeering trial in federal court. It is believed Turra was killed for ordering an assassination attempt on Joey Merlino as Merlino had feuded with his son, Louis Turra. Steven Mazzone is suspected in his killing. |
| Gino Marconi | April 10, 1999 | 42-year old Marconi operated as a drug dealer in South Philadelphia and may have had been murdered by the Philadelphia-Boston crew aligned with the Joey Merlino faction as Marconi refused to pay street tax. Marconi was shot 3 times in the chest and killed by a rifle outside of his home on the 2400 block of South 20th Street in South Philadelphia. |
| Ronald "Ronnie" Turchi | October 26, 1999 | 61-year old Turchi had once served as the consigliere for the Philadelphia family during the mid-1990s. Turchi was found in the trunk of his wife's car located on 7th and Federal Street on Passyunk Avenue in South Philadelphia with a plastic bag over his head. Turchi may have been killed for his association with Ralph Natale, who had become a government witness several weeks prior to the murder of Turchi, however another theory is that he may have had attempted to use his earnings to buy his way into the position of boss, giving the Gambino family $10,000 to be sworn in as the boss of the Philadelphia family. |
| Raymond "Long John" Martorano | January 17, 2002 | 74-year old Martorano was shot 3 times located on 700 block of Spruce Street in the Washington Square West section of Philadelphia whilst driving. Martorano had managed to drive about five blocks before crashing his car into a fire hydrant and was subsequently taken to Thomas Jefferson University Hospital, ultimately succumbing to his injuries and dying in hospital in February 2002. Martorano is the father to George Martorano, an associate of the Philadelphia family, whom had served over 32 years in prison for the wholesale distribution of marijuana, cocaine, methamphetamine, and methaqualone, from between September 1984 until his release from prison in October 2015. |
| John "Johnny Gongs" Casasanto | November 23, 2003 | 35-year old Casasanto was shot twice in the back and head and killed inside of his home located on 1200 block of Durfor Street, near 12th Street, in South Philadelphia, by members of the Merlino/Ligambi faction. Damion Canalichio and Anthony Nicodemo are suspects in his killing. Casasanto was a suspect in the January 2002 Raymond Martarano murder. It is believed Casasanto was killed for his allegiance to John Stanfa during the 1990s Merlino-Stanfa war, and that Casasanto had dated the wife of Joey Merlino whilst Merlino was serving a 14-year prison sentence for racketeering, extortion and illegal gambling. |
| Rocco Maniscalco | June 10, 2010 | 38-year old South Philadelphia bookmaker and loan shark, was shot 4 times in the back and killed located on the 1700 block of Wolf Street in South Philadelphia, near the intersection of Colorado Street, after he had left the Wolf Street Café after watching a Philadelphia Flyers hockey game and was walking home when he was shot, allegedly on orders of Joseph Ligambi for refusing to pay "protection money". |
| Gino DiPietro | December 12, 2012 | DiPietro was shot 5 times and killed outside of his home located at 2800 block of Iseminger Street in South Philadelphia by Philly mob soldier Dominic "Baby Dom" Grande. DiPietro was allegedly murdered over an unpaid debt in a backdoor poker game. Anthony Nicodemo was sentenced to a minimum of 25 years in prison after pleading guilty to conspiracy to the murder. According to George Anastasia, Nicodemo rejected several offers to cooperate against the Philadelphia crime family. |

== In popular culture ==
- At the beginning of Bruce Springsteen's 1982 song Atlantic City, mention is made of the murder of Phil "The Chicken Man" Testa, who was briefly the boss of the Philadelphia crime family from 1980 until his murder on March 15, 1981.
- In 2006, the film 10th & Wolf was released, and marketed as the true story of the Philadelphia Mafia. In this film, one of the two main characters is Joey "Skinny Joey" Merlino (played by Giovanni Ribisi), who was the second longest-serving boss of the Philadelphia crime family (having led them from 1999 to 2024).
- The 2006 courtroom comedy-drama film Find Me Guilty focuses on Jackie DiNorscio (portrayed by Vin Diesel), a notorious soldier in the Philadelphia crime family who later defects to the Lucchese crime family due to a bloody internal feud within the Philadelphia crime family that began after the murder of his boss, Angelo "The Gentle Don" Bruno.
- The Philadelphia Crime Family is the main antagonist of the 2006 video game The Sopranos: Road to Respect. In this game, the Philadelphia Crime Family (also known as the Buscetta Crime Family) are led by ruthless mob boss Angelo "Angie" Buscetta and are considered enemies of the DiMeo/Soprano crime family), mainly after Buscetta's nephew is killed by Paulie Gualtieri (the underboss of the DiMeo/Soprano crime family and Joey LaRocca (a key associate of the DiMeo/Soprano crime family).
- The Philadelphia crime family is the main antagonist of the two-part episode "The Gang Gets Whacked" (episodes 3x12 and 3x13 respectively) of the third season of It's Always Sunny in Philadelphia. In this episode, the Philadelphia crime family, led by the ruthless Don Sal (played by Joe Cortese) (Note: Based on the time The Gang Gets Whacked was released (November 1, 2007), it is heavily implied that Don Sal was based on Joey "Skinny Joey" Merlino, the second longest-serving boss of the Philadelphia crime family (from 1999 to 2024) and who was the boss of the Philadelphia crime family during the time period in which the events of The Gang Gets Whacked take place.) comes into conflict with the five protagonists of the series due to the fact that they stole a precious drug shipment that belongs to him.
- The Philadelphia crime family is considered an important part of the plot of the 2015 biopic film Legend. In this film, the longest-serving boss of the Philadelphia crime family, Angelo "The Gentle Don" Bruno (played by Chazz Palminteri) and his consigliere, Antonio "Tony Bananas" Caponigro (played by English actor Alex Giannini) are sent to London by Meyer Lansky (a powerful Jewish American mafia boss and one of the heads of the National Crime Syndicate) to negotiate a deal with the Kray twins (both played by Tom Hardy), a pair of identical twin brothers and powerful gangsters who ruled the London underworld during the 1960s and 1970s.
- The 2019 gangster film The Irishman focuses on two of the best known members of the Philadelphia crime family: Philadelphia crime family boss Angelo "The Gentle Don" Bruno (played by Harvey Keitel) and his underboss Felix "Skinny Razor" DiTullio (played by Bobby Cannavale). (Note: Based on the time period in which The Irishman is set, it is heavily implied that Felix "Skinny Razors" DiTullio was based on two real-life underbosses of the Philadelphia crime family, Antonio "Mr. Miggs" Pollina and Ignazio "Natz" Denaro.)

== See also ==
- Italian Market, Philadelphia

General:

- Crime in Philadelphia
- History of Italian Americans in Philadelphia
- List of Italian Mafia crime families

== Sources ==
=== Books ===
- Demaris, Ovid (1986). The Boardwalk Jungle. New York City: Bantam Books. ISBN 9780553051308.
- Jenkins, Philip, and Gary Potter. "The politics and mythology of organized crime: a Philadelphia case-study." Journal of Criminal Justice 15.6 (1987): 473–484.
- Salerno, Joseph (1990). The Plumber: The True Story of How One Good Man Helped Destroy the Entire Philadelphia Mafia. Philadelphia: Knightsbridge Publishing Co. ISBN 9781561290512.
- Anastasia, George (1991). Blood and Honor: Inside the Scarfo Mob, the Mafia's Most Violent Family. New York City: William Morrow & Co. ISBN 0940159864.
- Wagman, Robert J. (1994). Blood Oath. New York City: Simon & Schuster. ISBN 0671779052.
- Anastasia, George (1998). The Goodfella Tapes. New York City: William Morrow & Co. ISBN 0062009338.
- Morello, Celeste Anne (April 28, 2000). Before Bruno: The History of the Mafia and La Cosa Nostra in Philadelphia - Book One. Philadelphia: Jefferies & Manz, Inc. ISBN 9780967733418.
- Morello, Celeste Anne (November 28, 2001). Before Bruno: The History of the Philadelphia Mafia, 1931-1946 - Book Two. Philadelphia: Jefferies & Manz, Inc. ISBN 9780967733425.
- Anastasia, George (2004). The Last Gangster: From Cop to Wiseguy to FBI Informant: Big Ron Previte and the Fall of the American Mob. New York City: William Morrow & Co. ISBN 9780060544225.
- Morello, Celeste Anne (August 28, 2005). Before Bruno and How He Became Boss: The History of the Philadelphia Mafia, 1946–1959 — Book 3. Philadelphia: Jefferies & Manz, Inc. ISBN 9780977053209.

=== Reports ===
- Lane, Arthur S. (1980). Twelfth Annual Report (PDF) (Report). State of New Jersey Commission of Investigation. Archived from the original (PDF) on December 11, 2025 – via Government of New Jersey.
- Lewis Jr., Alvin B. (April 1981). 1980 Annual Report (PDF) (Report). Pennsylvania Crime Commission. Archived from the original (PDF) on November 17, 2021 – via Government of Pennsylvania.
- Lewis Jr., Alvin B. (April 1982). 1981 Annual Report (PDF) (Report). Pennsylvania Crime Commission. Archived from the original (PDF) on August 10, 2021 – via Government of Pennsylvania.
- Thurmond, Strom (1988). Organized Crime in America (PDF) (Report). National Institute of Justice – via United States Department of Justice.
- Reilly, Michael J. (April 25, 1989). 1989 Annual Report (PDF) (Report). Pennsylvania Crime Commission – via Government of Pennsylvania.
- Zazzali, James R. (September 1990). 21st Annual Report (PDF) (Report). State of New Jersey Commission of Investigation. Archived from the original (PDF) on June 1, 2021 – via Government of New Jersey.
- Reilly, Michael J. (March 30, 1991). 1990 Annual Report – Organized Crime in Pennsylvania: A Decade of Change (PDF) (Report). Pennsylvania Crime Commission. Archived from the original (PDF) on June 7, 2021 – via Government of Pennsylvania.
- Richardson, A. (May 1991). Outlaw Motorcycle Gangs – USA Overview (PDF) (Report). State of California Department of Justice, Bureau of Organized Crime and Criminal Intelligence. Archived from the original (PDF) on May 26, 2023 – via United States Department of Justice.
- Schiller, Francis E. (May 2004). The Changing Face of Organized Crime in New Jersey (PDF) (Report). State of New Jersey Commission of Investigation. Archived from the original (PDF) on April 17, 2016 – via Government of New Jersey.
