= Harry Riccobene =

American mobster

- Mugshot of Riccobene
- Born: July 27, 1909; Enna, Sicily, Italy
- Died: June 19, 2000 (aged 90); SCI Dallas, Dallas, Pennsylvania, U.S.
- Other name: "The Hunchback"

Harry "The Hunchback" Riccobene (July 27, 1909 – June 19, 2000) was a high-ranking member of the Philadelphia crime family who became a major figure in the Scarfo-Riccobene gang war that followed the 1981 death of boss Philip Testa.

He was born in Enna, Sicily, to Mario Riccobene Sr. and Anna Cimmari. His father, Mario, left Philadelphia to search for a job working in the coal mines in West Virginia and joined him in 1913. His father eventually found work as a stonemason in South Philadelphia. In 1925, Harry's biological mother died of unknown causes and Mario adopted his two nephews, Robert and Mario Jr. after their own mother died during the 1918 flu pandemic. By the 1960s he was separated from his wife Evelyn and is the stepbrother of Mario (Sonny), Robert and Enrico Riccobene. He spoke in a high pitched voice and as he grew older he donned a long white beard. One prospective juror for one of his criminal trials described him as looking like "A little Santa Claus." His legitimate businesses includes television tube companies in Philadelphia, Yonkers, New York and Richmond, Virginia. His arrest record included carrying a concealed weapon, larceny, and possession of narcotics. At one point, Riccobene spent time in prison on a narcotics conviction.

A longtime underworld figure in Philadelphia, Riccobene became a soldier under Prohibition mob boss Salvatore Sabella in 1927. Riccobene witnessed the rash of violence that started with the unsanctioned murder of Philadelphia crime boss Angelo Bruno and his replacement by Philip "Chicken Man" Testa. After running the family for one year, Testa was killed by a nail bomb at his home. Nicodemo "Little Nicky" Scarfo then became family boss. Riccobene led a faction against Scarfo for control of family operations in Atlantic City, New Jersey. Scarfo consigliere Frank Monte informed his crew that he was going to kill Riccobene and take over his loansharking and illegal gambling operations. Monte approached Mario Riccobene, Riccobene's half-brother, and demanded that Mario set up Riccobene to be killed. However, Mario betrayed Monte by telling Riccobene about the plot. Infuriated, Riccobene ordered Mario and hitmen Joseph Pedulla and Victor DeLuca to instead kill Monte, to "... get them before they get us."

On February 21, 1981, Riccobene and nine other mobsters were indicted on federal racketeering charges relating to loansharking, fraud and illegal gambling. He was convicted under the RICO Act on May 7, 1982. Riccobene was sentenced on June 25, 1982 to nine years in prison and fined $15,000.

Between August 1982 and January 1984, Scarfo was imprisoned in a Texas penitentiary for gun possession. During that time, Riccobene began to form another faction that opposed Scarfo. Mario, Pedulla, and DeLuca camped out in a van near Monte's parked Cadillac, waiting for him to come outside. Several hours later, Monte emerged and started getting into his car. Pedulla fired on Monte three times, killing him. Later on, the men unsuccessfully attempted to murder Salvatore Testa, Phil Testa's son, but this time they were arrested by police. Harry's brother Mario became a government informant. Riccobene was indicted on charges of first degree murder. During the trial, Riccobene denied any involvement in organized crime and said that he tried to prevent the three men from committing violence amid "unfounded rumors" of death threats made against them by Scarfo. Despite this, he was convicted of murder and sentenced to life imprisonment.

In 2000, Harry Riccobene died from sepsis at the State Correctional Institute at Dallas, Pennsylvania.

== Sources ==
- Sifakis, Carl. The Mafia Encyclopedia. New York: Da Capo Press, 2005. ISBN 978-0-8160-5694-1
- Sifakis, Carl. The Encyclopedia of American Crime. New York: Facts on File Inc., 2005. ISBN 978-0-8160-4040-7
- Blood and Honor: Inside the Scarfo Mob - The Mafia's Most Violent Family by George Anastasia, 2004, ISBN 0940159864
- Bureau of Narcotics, U.S. Treasury Department, "Mafia: the Government's Secret File on Organized Crime, HarperCollins Publishers 2007 ISBN 0-06-136385-5
