= Reginald E. Beauchamp =

American sculptor (1910–2000)

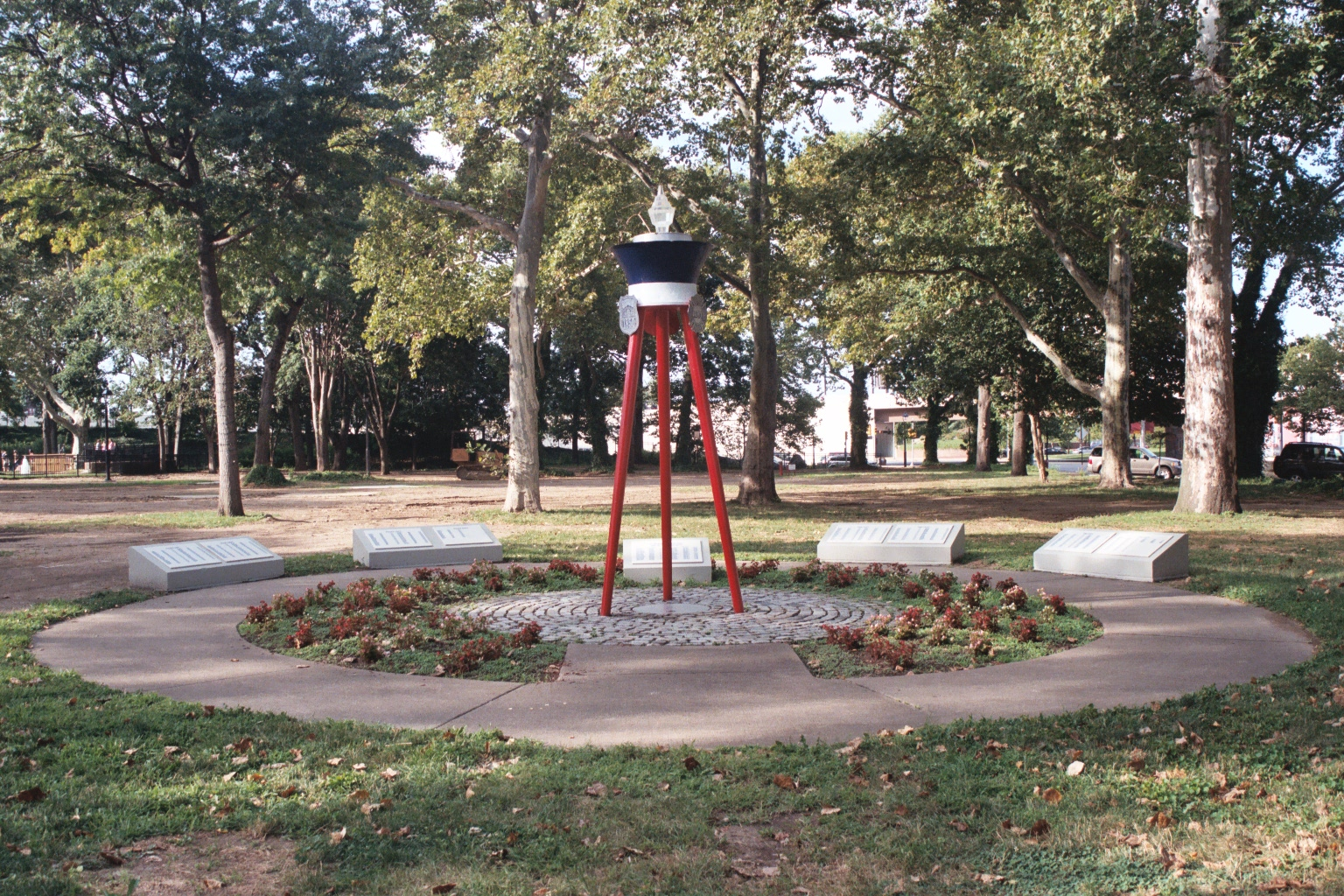
Beauchamp's 1976 Living Flame Memorial to the city's police officers and firefighters in Philadelphia's Franklin Square. Location: 39.955370°N 75.149810°W

Reginald E. Beauchamp (December 8, 1910 – December 20, 2000) was an American sculptor whose works include Penny Franklin (1971), Whispering Bells of Freedom (1976), and a bust of Connie Mack that sits in the Baseball Hall of Fame.

Born in London, Beauchamp immigrated to the United States at age 2 with his family, entering the country through Ellis Island. They lived for five years in Rensselaer, New York, before settling in Philadelphia. He worked as the director of special events and then the head of public relations and personnel at the Philadelphia Bulletin newspaper from 1945 to 1975. He was also involved in various community groups, including Rotary International, the Philadelphia Sketch Club, the Poor Richard Club, and the Philadelphia Public Relations Association, which named him the first member of its hall of fame in 1972. He was also a member of the Union League.

"As much as any man in recent history, Reginald Beauchamp has put his stamp on the city," a Philadelphia Inquirer columnist wrote in 1997.

== Artworks ==
Beauchamp created 25 works of public art, most of which were installed in Philadelphia. Among them are:

- The Living Flame Memorial, erected in 1976 in Franklin Square as the city's monument to honor city police and firefighters fallen in the line of duty.
- The Hero Mosaic in Philadelphia City Hall.
- The Vietnam Bronze War Memorial at Edison High School. The North Philly school lost 66 former students in the Vietnam War, more than any other U.S. high school. Tony Burgee, class of 1961, led the effort to create the memorial.
- The Signing of the Declaration of Independence painting at the Mellon Independence Center mall.
- A bronze of Dave Zinkoff, a veteran announcer of Philadelphia sporting events, at the Philadelphia Spectrum arena.
- A "plastic glass spire" at Mercy Philadelphia Hospital.
- Whispering Bells of Freedom (1976), outside the African American Museum in downtown Philadelphia.

In 1986, two Beauchamp bronze bas-reliefs of the face of Civil War hero George C. Platt were installed at the approaches to the George C. Platt Bridge over the Schuylkill River. They were commissioned by Platt's great-great-grandson, Lawrence Griffin Platt, who raised $10,000 with the help of a former Gulf Oil Co. executive, and were mounted on poles at either end of the bridge. One was stolen in 1987; the other was stolen later. A $500 reward offered by the Philadelphia Daily News in 2002 did not secure their return.

Beauchamp once hung colored ribbons from the statue of William Penn atop Philadelphia City Hall to nearby buildings, creating the look of a maypole more than 500 feet tall.

In 1967, he unsuccessfully proposed a $5 million, 14-story bust of Benjamin Franklin to be mounted on Belmont Plateau in the city's Fairmount Park. It was to be made of vertical stainless-steel tubes, six inches in diameter and one inch apart, that would have been lit from the interior of the sculpture.

Among the privately held works by Beauchamp is a sculptural rendition of John Trumbull's painting of the signing of the Declaration of Independence, installed at the Philadelphia Protestant Home in the Lawndale neighborhood.

Another is "Philadelphia Then & Now", a 53-by-68-inch painting commissioned by the Philadelphia Bulletin in 1947 to commemorate the newspaper's 100th anniversary. It depicts the city as it appeared in 1847, with the contemporary skyline floating in the clouds above. The painting was exhibited at Newman Gallery, hung for 25 years at the Poor Richard Club, shifted into private hands in the mid-1970s, and was offered at auction in 2009.

=== Penny Franklin ===
Beauchamp's favorite of his public works was Penny Franklin, a bust of Ben Franklin that was covered with 80,000 pennies collected from local schoolchildren. The work was conceived as a commemoration of the 100th anniversary of the Philadelphia Fire Department, the professional descendant of the Franklin-founded Union Fire Company, and an homage to the man who coined the phrase "a penny saved is a penny earned."

Using clay, Beauchamp modeled an adult-sized bust of a long-haired, gentle-eyed fellow — the Franklin of the history books, wise and timeless. Then he reached into his penny supply and covered the entire thing with coins, creating a sort of chain-mail effect. Beauchamp completed it with a quarter-inch coating of fiberglass.

The sculpture was installed in 1971 in Girard Fountain Park in Philadelphia's Old City neighborhood, and dedicated in a June 10 ceremony that featured a speech by U.S. Mint Director Mary Brooks. "It was a hit ... a favorite of tourists and passersby on Arch Street for 25 years", The Philadelphia Inquirer wrote. A box that would play a recorded message at the push of a button was less popular with nearby residents, and it was eventually dismantled.

The sculpture took a beating from children who climbed on it and vandals who pried off chunks of coins. In 1982, the city coated it with a defensive layer of epoxy and Beauchamp painted it to make it look "normal statuary green." "All those pennies don't do wonders for his complexion. But there are plenty of young adults in Philadelphia today who can remember donating their pennies to the cause", the Inquirer wrote.

Over a quarter-century, the work deteriorated, "began to lean precariously and became a hazard to pedestrians." Firefighters from the firehouse next door eventually tied ropes around the sculpture to keep it from toppling over.

In August 1996, the sculpture was removed to Philips Casting, a foundry where officials with the city government's Arts Commission sought to determine whether it could be repaired. The cost, estimated in the tens of thousands of dollars, was ultimately deemed prohibitive, and the work was moved to a municipal warehouse in South Philadelphia. "I've done a lot of things for this city, but that was my favorite", Beauchamp said.

In 2001, the Inquirer reported that local businessman Kal Rudman had offered to fund a restoration of the sculpture so it could be displayed in the Franklin Institute.

The sculpture's place in the park was taken in October 2007 by Keys To Community, a bronze sculpture by James Peniston, who echoed Beauchamp's work by sculpting a bust of Franklin and covering it with casts of keys collected from neighborhood schoolchildren.

== Family ==
Beauchamp's wife of 64 years, Elizabeth Sarah "Betty" Beauchamp, died January 9, 1999, of leukemia. She had helped create many of his public art works. An obituary noted:

In her earlier years, the former Elizabeth Brown worked for the Curtis Publishing Co. in the subscription department. Because the company would not employ married women, she and her future husband drove about 100 miles to Pottsville to be married. She kept her name out of the license columns of the Philadelphia newspapers and kept her marital status secret until she left Curtis to raise a family.

The Beauchamps had two sons, Ronald and Roy; and a daughter, Irene B. Brooks.
