= Martin Bickham =

American merchant

- Born: 28 April 1776; New Jersey, United States
- Died: 23 August 1858 (aged 82); Lancaster, Pennsylvania, United States
- Occupations: Merchant, diplomat
- Spouse: Emilie Raymonde Adeline Eugenie Rivalz de St Antoine
- Children: 3

Martin Bickham (born c. 1780) was an American merchant.

== Personal life ==
Bickham was born in New Jersey in approximately 1780, his family originated in Chester, England, and had emigrated to the Philadelphia region in the late 17th century. His elder sister, Sally Bickham, became mistress to merchant Stephen Girard in 1787, after his wife was committed to an insane asylum. Martin was looked after by Girard, almost as a surrogate son, and he was taught the merchant's business from the age of fourteen. Girard financially supported Martin and Sally's father, Caleb Bickham, until his death in 1799. Sally left Girard amicably in 1796 to marry.

Bickham established his own import/export firm in Philadelphia but was unable to make a success of it and the company went bankrupt. He returned to Girard and, in 1796, was sent as supercargo on Girard's ship Sally II to Île de France (later known as Mauritius), where he became the first US merchant to conduct trade with the island. Bickham acted as Girard's agent on the island from 1798 and traded rice, indigo, flour, brandy, tea, cookware, hats, Chinese fans, umbrellas and French imports. In 1799 he took the Sally II to Manila, Philippines under Girard's order to trade for sugar and indigo. On 2 October 1805 he married Eugenie Rivalz in Mauritius. Bickham served as US Consul to Île de France from 1816 to 1825, when he returned to the United States. Bickham was embroiled in a long-running legal case, White-Larramendi v. Martin Bickham, which concerned the loss of cargo from a ship owned by Bickham and ran from 1802 to 1829.

Bickham had a son, whom he named Stephen Girard Bickham, and arranged for him to be indentured to Girard. Girard invested $1,500 in training the boy in business, though his indentureship remained uncompleted upon Girard's death in 1831. Stephen Bickham later became a successful merchant in his own right. Martin Bickham also had a daughter, LaDorie, who married the Comte DuPont and had one son, Arthur DuPont. After the deaths of the Comte and LaDorie, Martin and Stephan Bickham became the managers of the DuPont estate in the United States.

The Historical Society of Pennsylvania holds some of Bickham's records. The Girard College (founded by Stephen Girard) also holds an archive of documents relating to Bickham, including letters between Bickham and Girard.
