= 1975 Philadelphia Gulf refinery fire =

Fire at refinery in Philadelphia, Pennsylvania

Coordinates: 39.902°N 75.208°W

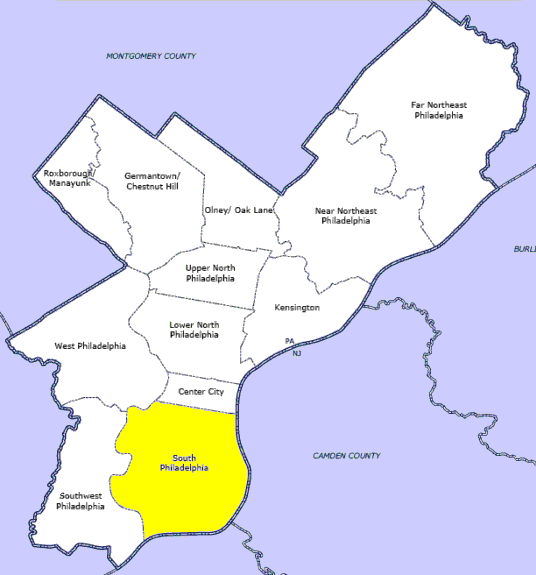
- Date: August 17, 1975
- Time: 5:57 a.m.
- Location: South Philadelphia
- Type: Fire
- Deaths: 8
- Injuries: 14

A refinery owned by Gulf Oil Corporation in Philadelphia, located at Girard Point on the Schuylkill River in South Philadelphia, caught fire on Sunday, August 17, 1975. This incident grew into an 11-alarm fire, not brought under control until 24 hours later, and resulted in the death of eight firefighters of the Philadelphia Fire Department (PFD), injuries to 14 other firefighters, and the loss of four PFD vehicles.

At the height of this fire, the loss of the huge, sprawling refinery complex was regarded as a real possibility as a tremendous firestorm enveloped two storage tanks, travelled through portions of the on-site piping, and destroyed the refinery's administration building.

== Before the fire ==
The Girard Point Refinery, built in 1905, occupied 723 acres (2.93 km^{2}) of land located on the east bank of the Schuylkill River, from Girard Point in the south to Penrose Avenue in the north, with the ARCO Point Breeze Refinery located on the north side of Penrose Avenue and extending toward Passyunk Avenue. An elevated section of Penrose Avenue passes between the refineries site, leading to the Penrose Avenue Bridge, connecting the east and west sides of the Schuylkill River.

At the time of 1975 fire, the Girard Point Refinery (the refinery) produced 180,000 barrels (29,000 m^{3}) per day of refined petroleum products.

Prior to August 17, 1975, the refinery had been the scene of ten extra-alarm fires since 1960. On September 9, 1960, several storage tanks were struck by lightning at the height of severe thunderstorms and resulted in an eight-alarm fire. On May 16, 1975, a six-alarm fire struck the refinery.

At 12:45 a.m. on the morning of Sunday, August 17, 1975, the tanker M/T Afran Neptune, tied up at one of the Gulf Refinery docks, began pumping reconstituted Venezuelan crude oil (with an additional 5 percent naphtha) into Gulf Refinery Tank No. 231. Tank No. 231, built in 1929, of riveted seam construction, had a capacity of 75,000 barrels (11,900 m^{3}) and had recently been renovated with an internal floating roof. Within the refinery's road system, the tank was located at Avenue “Y” and 4th Street.

Avenue “Y” is an east–west street running parallel to and just to the north of the Penrose Avenue Bridge, while 4th Street is a north–south street running perpendicular to the Penrose Avenue Bridge and Avenue Y.

Located just west of Tank No. 231 was Boiler House No. 4, the site of a four-alarm fire on April 22, 1967. A brick chimney arose from Boiler House No. 4 and this stack was a familiar sight to westbound motorists on the Penrose Avenue Bridge, as the word “GULF” was painted in large, white letters.

== The fire ==
Hydrocarbon vapors, emanating from Tank 231, accumulated in the area of the boiler house and were ignited by an unknown ignition source. A flame front followed the vapors back to Tank 231, causing fire at the tank's vents and an explosion within the outer shell of the stack. These events began to unfold at 5:57 a.m.

Shortly thereafter, a second explosion occurred within Tank 231. Burning petroleum spilled from the tank's vents into a diked area surrounding the tank. Within the diked area, a second tank (No. 114) just north of Tank 231, containing No. 6 grade fuel oil, also ignited as pipelines within the diked area began to fail. The initial explosion also damaged the pipe manifold outside of the dike wall and petroleum pouring out under pressure ignited.

=== 1st and 2nd alarms ===
At 6:04 a.m., upon receiving the report of fire from the Gulf Refinery, the Philadelphia Fire Department transmitted the refinery's fire alarm box: Box 5988, Penrose and Lanier Avenues. Upon leaving their station, Engine 60 (the assigned first-due engine company) could see fire and smoke conditions at a distance, and before arriving at the refinery, Engine 60 ordered the second alarm at 6:09 a.m.

=== 3rd to 6th alarms ===
First arriving companies had large clouds of heavy black smoke emanating from Tank No. 231, fire on top of Tank No. 114, and fire showing from the 150-foot (46 m) stack at Boiler House No. 4. The third and fourth alarms were ordered in quick succession by Battalion Chief 1, Arthur Foley, at 6:11 a.m. and 6:14 a.m. Acting Assistant Fire Chief Dalmon Edmunds ordered the fifth alarm at 6:34 am. The sixth alarm was ordered by Fire Commissioner Joseph Rizzo at 6:52 a.m.

Over the next several hours, firefighters utilized deluge guns and master streams to cool down surrounding exposures, and applied foam directly to the burning tanks and piping in an effort to extinguish the fire. By 8:44 a.m., it appeared that the fire was well contained and the situation sufficiently stabilized to declare the fire under control.

Commissioner Rizzo remained on the firegrounds throughout the warm, muggy August day to continue to oversee the firefighting operation. Philadelphia's two foam pumpers, Engines 160 and 133, along with the Gulf Refinery's foam pumper, continued to apply foam to the burning tank, piping and manifolds. Additional foam was acquired throughout the day from the fire department's warehouse and the nearby Atlantic Richfield refinery. It was also obtained from the National Foam Company in West Chester, Pennsylvania.

However, as the firefighting operation progressed, it became apparent that the refinery's sewage system was not up to the task of properly draining the foam, water and petroleum-naphtha product mixture that was accumulating on the ground along Avenue Y, between 4th Street and 5th Street to the east, running in front of the refinery's administration building. These drainage problems were further exacerbated by a decision by refinery personnel to shut off drainage pumps. These pumps were shut off as part of a decision to de-energize overhead power lines that ran adjacent to Tank 231 along 4th Street. As the liquid mixture continued to build up in Avenue Y, Engines 16 and 40 were sent to Avenue Y and 5th Street to draft from a sewer intake and pump the material to a diked area some distance away.

=== Additional ignition ===
Engine 133 was set up on the east side of Tank No. 231 at Avenue “Y” at 4th Street, applying foam to the tank. Three members were attending to the apparatus and wading in the foam-water-petroleum mixture which was accumulating on the ground. Commissioner Rizzo and Gulf Refinery manager Jack Burk were on an overhead catwalk nearby observing the fire-fighting operation. Without warning, and in full view of Commissioner Rizzo and Burk, the accumulating liquid surrounding Engine 133 ignited, immediately trapping the three firefighters working at Engine 133. Without hesitation, other nearby firefighters dove into the burning liquid to rescue their comrades, not aware of the danger to themselves. Five more firefighters would be consumed by the advancing fire.

=== 7th to 9th alarms ===
It was now 4:41 p.m. and a firestorm was developing as the fire quickly spread eastward along Avenue “Y” towards 5th Street. Viewing the unfolding horror before him, Commissioner Rizzo ordered the seventh and eighth alarms, five additional rescue squads, and the recall of all companies which had previously been released from the firegrounds throughout the day. The burned firefighters were loaded into the Gulf Refinery Ambulance which roared past Rescue 7 – a mobile intensive care squad and the first apparatus to arrive on the scene after the liquid reignited. Firemedics in Rescue 7 took up a position behind an expressway pillar but found the position untenable due to the excessive heat from the fire. The apparatus was moved to the road East of the expressway and found the Gulf Fire chief on the ground suffering from a heart attack. As Rescue 7 treated the Gulf Fire chief the Administration building ignited from the heat and became fully involved in fire. At 4:46 p.m., Commissioner Rizzo ordered the ninth alarm and notification of Philadelphia Managing Director Hillel Levinson as a major disaster was now unfolding at the Gulf Refinery.

As the fire swept eastward along 5th Street, Philadelphia's foam pumpers, Engines 160 and 133, and the Gulf Refinery foam pumper were destroyed in the fire's advance. At 5th Street, where Engines 16 and 40 had been assigned to improve drainage, their pieces were also destroyed in the fire's path, although their pump operators were able to escape. Upon reaching 5th Street, the fire traveled two city blocks north along 5th Street, threatening four additional storage tanks and the 125-foot (38 m) Penrose Avenue Bridge.

=== 10th alarm and unrelated 3-alarm fire ===
At 5:37 p.m., Commissioner Rizzo ordered the tenth alarm as the fire was then traveling southward and engulfing the refinery's administration building, which was located on the south side of Avenue “Y” between 4th and 5th Streets. The tenth alarm companies were ordered to report to Gate 24 at Penrose and Lanier Avenues, to set up deluge guns then remove themselves from the area.

As the tenth alarm was being requested, the burden on the city's firefighting personnel was exacerbated by a box alarm transmitted for a fire in a paper warehouse 8.6 miles (13.8 km) away at “F” Street and Erie Avenue in North Philadelphia. Upon arrival, Chief Edward Hampson, Battalion Chief 10, had heavy fire in a three-story, former printing company now being used for paper storage. The second alarm was ordered at 6:07 p.m., followed by a special call for three additional engine companies at 7:18 p.m. Assistant Fire Chief James Skala, who had been at the New Jersey shore, returned to the city and assumed command of operations.

=== 11th alarm ===
As the situation continued to deteriorate at the Gulf Refinery, Commissioner Rizzo ordered all of the "D" platoon members from the day shift held over, and at 6:01 p.m., he ordered the 11th alarm. By 7 a.m., the involved tanks and pipelines were gushing flames and nearby streets in the complex were burning streams of oil and other petroleum products.

For a period of time, it was far from certain where the fire would be stopped. Burk was quoted as saying that contingency plans had been made for a retreat through the refinery, street by street, tank by tank. But the PFD attacked, retaking 5th Street, 4th Street, and finally Avenue Y. At 1 a.m. on Monday, August 18, 1975, Commissioner Rizzo left the firegrounds, going to area hospitals to visit the injured firefighters and to the homes of the families of the members who were unaccounted for. He relinquished command to Deputy Fire Commissioner Harry T. Kite.

A second tank, 239, storing naphtha, was also involved in the fire. This tank was located on 4th Street just north of Avenue "Y." On Monday morning, naphtha was pouring out of a 12-inch (300 mm) pipe in that tank and igniting in mid-air. The naphtha was burning in the street in an ever-widening pool. To curtail this fire, it was determined that the valve, hidden behind an earthen levee at the rear of the tank, about 100 feet (30 m) from the burning naphtha, needed to be closed. Three Gulf employees volunteered to attempt to close the valve. Using an aluminum boat, they waded through the material contained within the dike surrounding the tank. Firefighters placed a water curtain over them as they kept moving forward to reach the valve. They successfully reached the valve, spun it shut, and took the time to tighten it with a wrench. This operation took five minutes.

=== Under control and (later) Fire out ===
Just minutes short of a full 24 hours after the fire started, Deputy Commissioner Kite declared the fire under control (but still burning) at 5:38 a.m. on Monday, August 18, 1975.

A decision was made to allow the fire in the original tank, Tank 231, to burn itself out, and the fire was not declared extinguished until Tuesday, August 26, 1975. However, in the intervening week, box alarms were transmitted for “flare-ups” on four occasions to assist the fireground details that continued to work on the fire.

== Casualties ==
By the morning of Monday, August 18, 1975, the cost to PFD personnel was confirmed. Six firefighters were killed and two were severely burned – and would die in the next few days – from the flare-up that occurred on Sunday afternoon.

With the fire still burning on Monday, five of the dead firemen had been recovered but the fire was still too intense to recover the sixth body at that time.

Fourteen other firefighters were burned and/or injured in their attempts to rescue the men caught in the flare-up.

The six firefighters killed onsite were:

- Firefighter John Andrews, Age 49, Engine 49
- Firefighter Joseph Wiley, Age 33, Ladder 27
- Firefighter Roger Parker, Age 28, Ladder 27
- Firefighter Hugh McIntyre, Age 53, Engine 56
- Firefighter Robert Fisher, Age 43, Engine 33
- Firefighter Ralph Campana, Age 41, Ladder 19

The two firefighters rescued, but fatally injured, were:

- Fire Lieutenant James Pouliot, Age 35, Engine 20, died of his burns on August 24, 1975
- Firefighter Carroll Brenek, Age 33, Engine 57, died of his burns on August 30, 1975.

== Cause of fire ==
The original cause of the fire was the overfilling of Tank 231. While no crude oil escaped from the tank as a result of being overfilled, large quantities of hydrocarbon vapors were trapped above the surface of the tank's crude oil. As the quantity of crude oil increased, these hydrocarbon vapors were forced out of the tank's vents and into the area of the No. 4 Boiler House where the initial flash occurred. The overfilling of the tank, in turn, resulted from a failure of the tanker's personnel to properly monitor the quantity of crude oil being pumped to the tank. At approximately 6:02 a.m. in the wake of the first explosions and fire, the tanker terminated its pumping operations, left its Schuylkill River berth and relocated downstream to the Gulf piers at Hog Island, near the junction of the Schuylkill with the Delaware River.

== October 1975 9-alarm fire ==
Two months after the disaster, another 9 alarm fire broke out at the nearby ARCO refinery. On site this time, in addition to Fire Commissioner Rizzo, was Philadelphia Mayor Frank Rizzo, the commissioner's brother. As with the August fire, the October fire was eventually deemed under control when a sudden flare up sent many of the firefighters and media scrambling for cover. Mayor Rizzo was knocked over by his bodyguard and suffered a severely broken right femur, which required surgery.

== Aftermath ==
On August 21, 1975, Governor Milton Shapp asked for an investigation into the cause of the fire.

On September 4, 1975, Attorney General Robert P. Kane asked for a task force investigation into the fire.

In October 1975, Philadelphia, represented by city lawyer Sheldon Albert, asked Gulf to pay $1.3 million in compensation damages for the city, and compensation for the widows and children of the firemen.

In July 1977, Gulf was fined $37,000 ($197,000 today) on charges covering more than 100 violations of the Philadelphia fire code. Thirty-nine charges were reportedly dismissed by judge Earl Simmons Jr.

In August 2007, about 200 people gathered at the Fireman's Hall Museum in Philadelphia as International Association of Fire Fighters President Harold Shaitberger unveiled individual plaques honoring the firefighters lost in the refinery disaster.

In 1982, following the merger of Gulf Oil and Chevron Corporation, the Gulf Girard Point refinery became the Chevron USA Philadelphia refinery. In 1994, Sunoco purchased the refinery from Chevron, merging it with the adjoining Point Breeze refinery complex (which Sunoco purchased in 1988) into a single operation—the largest on the U.S. Eastern seaboard. In 2012, Sunoco and investment firm The Carlyle Group formed the Philadelphia Energy Solutions (PES) partnership, to own and operate the refinery complex, renamed PES Philadelphia Refining Complex.
