= Girard Fountain Park =

Pocket park in Philadelphia

Coordinates: 39°57′09″N 75°08′47″W

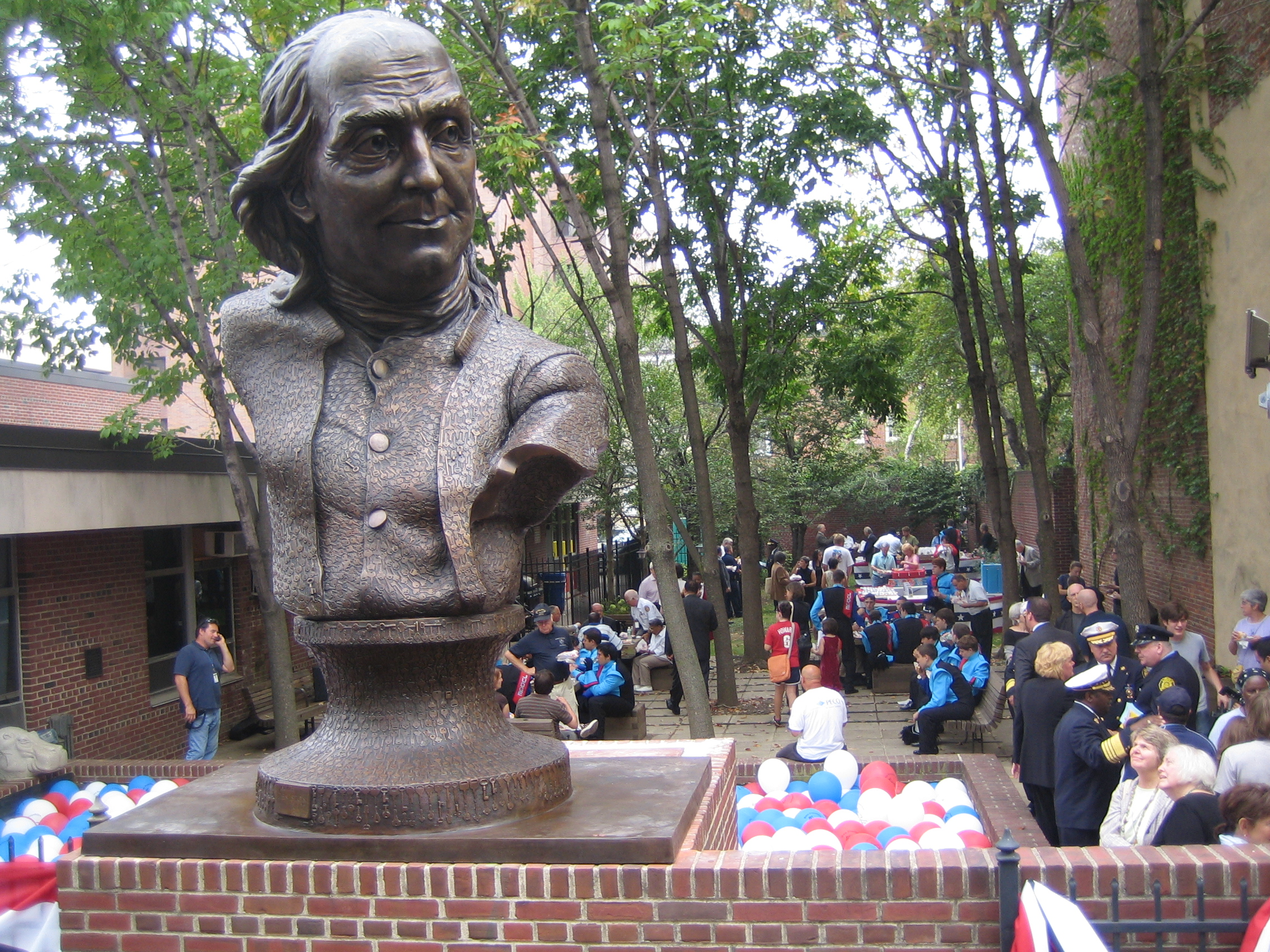
October 2007: The dedication of Keys To Community, a nine-foot bronze bust of Benjamin Franklin by sculptor James Peniston

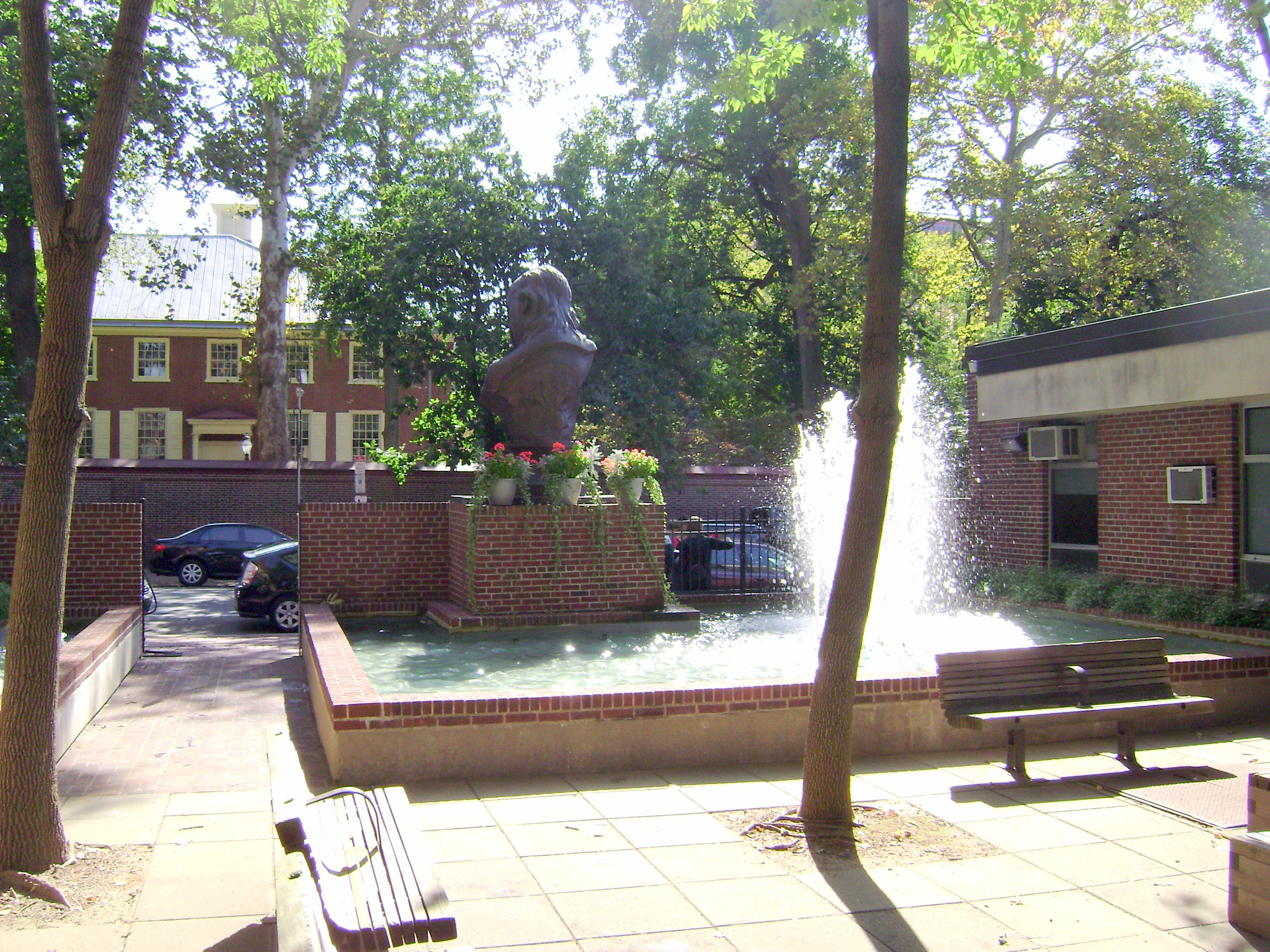
October 2009: Looking south toward the fountain and the bust of Franklin

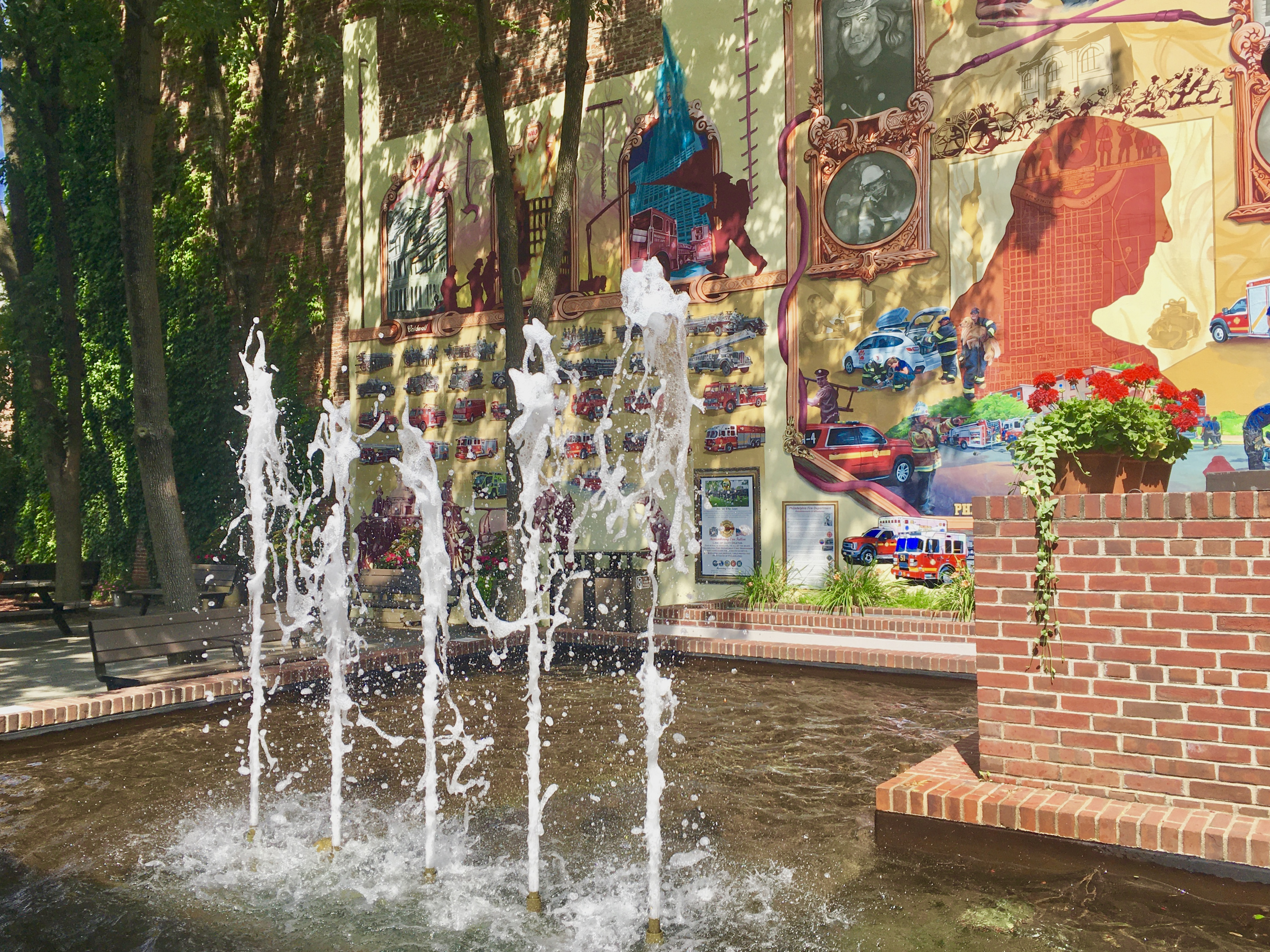
July 2020: The fountain and the 2019 mural

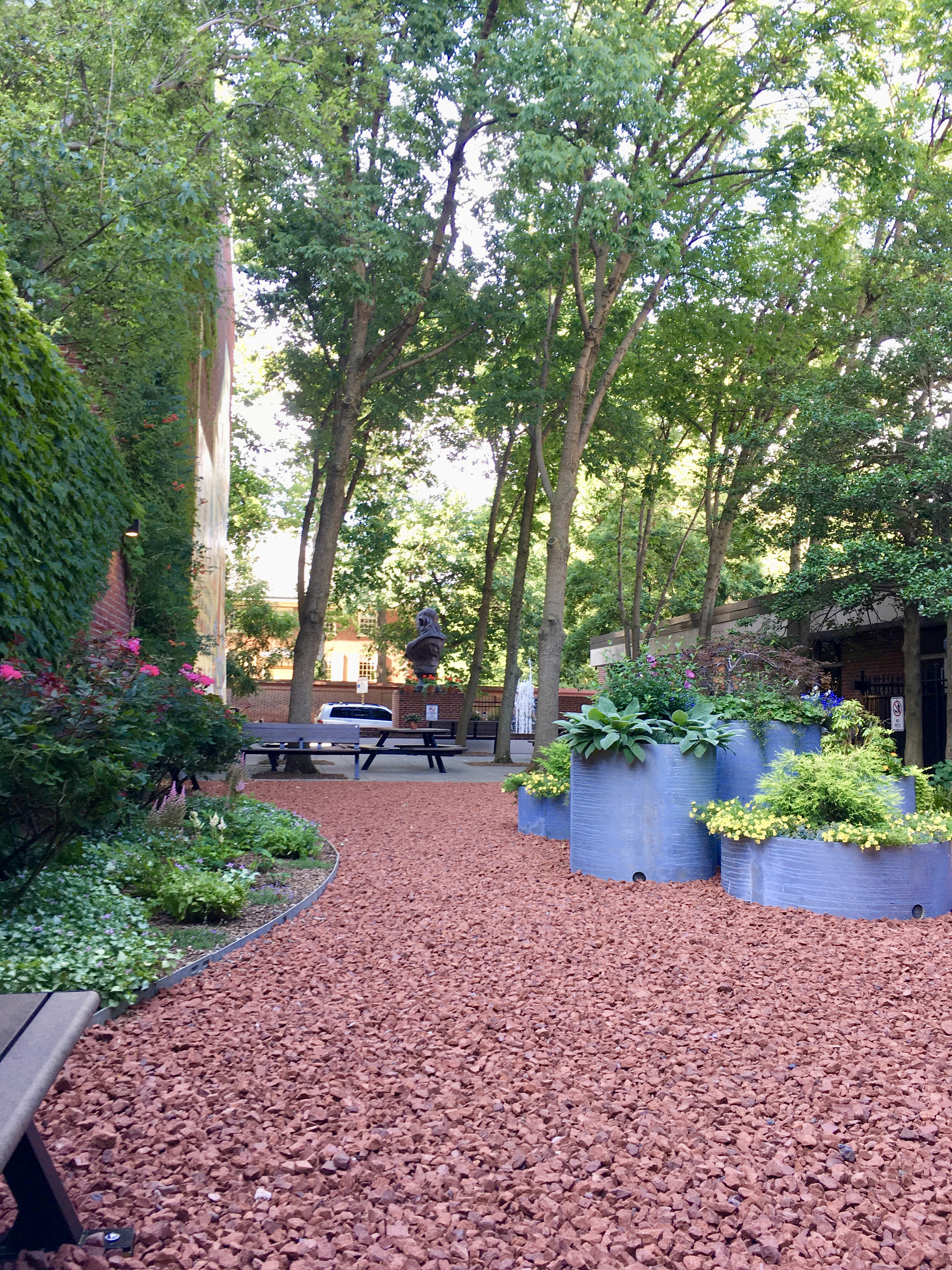
July 2020: Looking south from the garden toward the seating area and fountain

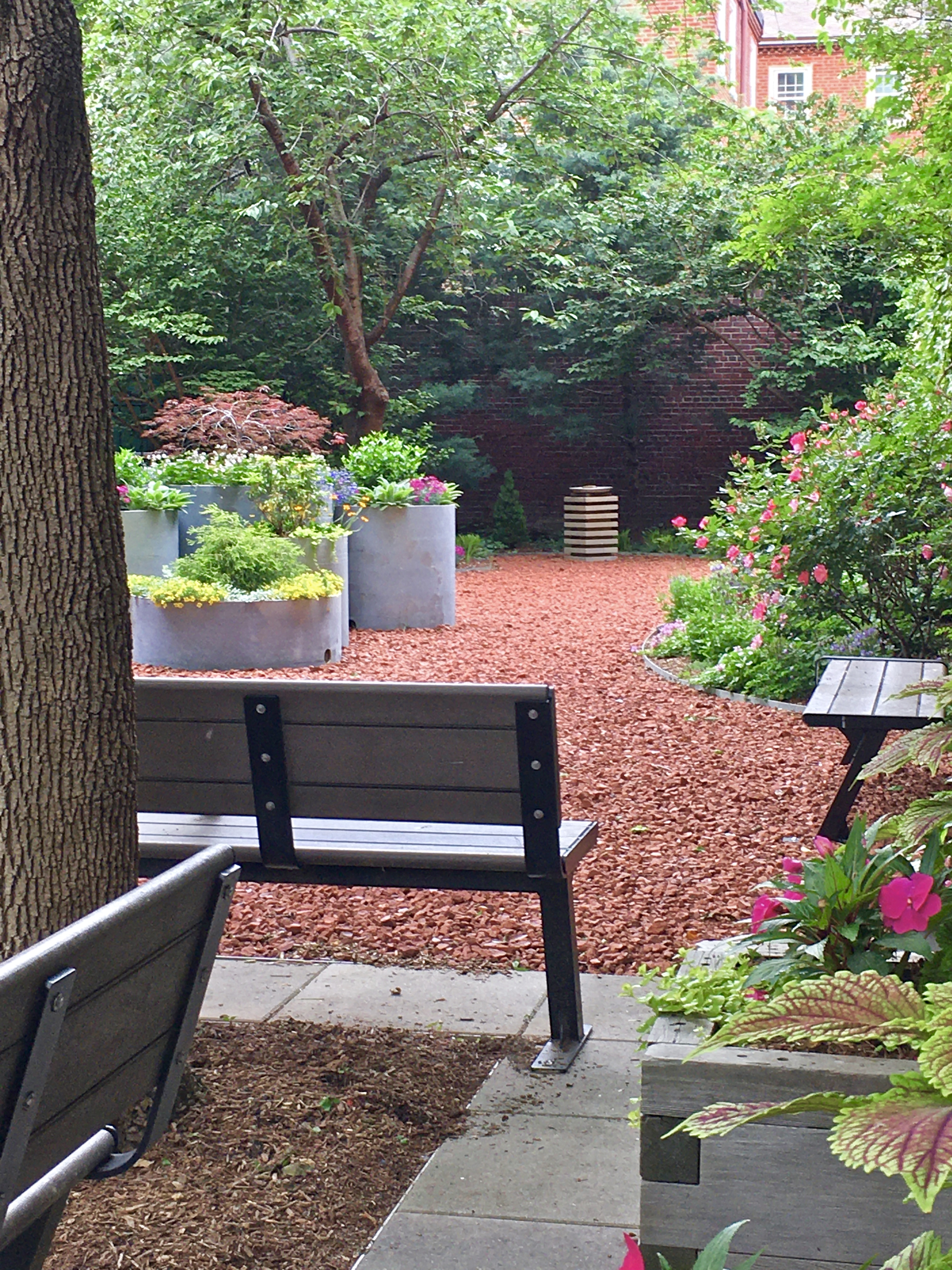
July 2020: Looking north from the central seating area to the garden area, which was improved in 2019

Girard Fountain Park is a 0.15-acre (610 m^{2}) pocket park in the Old City neighborhood of Philadelphia, at 325 Arch Street. It is open to the public during daylight hours and is maintained by local volunteers now incorporated as Old City Green.

== History ==
=== 20th century ===
The park was created in the mid-1960s after the demolition of four 3- and 4-story commercial buildings that had stood on the northeast corner of 4th and Arch Streets. A firehouse was built on the corner lots, while the lot formerly occupied by 325 Arch was cleared.

In 1971, a sculpture of Benjamin Franklin by local sculptor Reginald E. Beauchamp was installed atop the park's front wall. It was made of acrylic and covered with almost 80,000 pennies collected from local schoolchildren, and it incorporated a device that delivered a recorded two-minute speech on fire prevention at the push of a button. Penny Franklin was unveiled on June 10, 1971, by U.S. Mint Director Mary Brooks. Over the next two decades, the sculpture, also known as Penny Benny, became "one of the city's best-known landmarks." But the acrylic sculpture eventually deteriorated and became a hazard. For a while, it was kept from tumbling onto the sidewalk by ropes rigged by the firefighters from the firehouse next door. In 1996, it was moved to city storage.

The park was improved using a 1976 grant from a city-held fund established by banker Stephen Girard (1750–1831) to improve areas near the Delaware River.

By the mid-1990s, the park itself had fallen into disrepair. "The park was under the jurisdiction of the Philadelphia Department of Public Property, rather than the parks and recreation department, and it simply became overlooked," the Philadelphia Inquirer would later write. Its gate was generally kept locked by the Fire Department.

=== 21st century ===
In 2003, the city's public arts agency commissioned sculptor James Peniston to replace the Beauchamp sculpture, with additional funding from the Fire Department and more than 1.5 million pennies donated by schoolchildren in 500 area schools. Peniston sculpted a bust of Franklin textured with casts of some 1,000 keys collected from schoolchildren. The sculpture is made of about one ton of bronze, which includes several brass nameplates representing Philadelphia firefighters fallen in the line of duty over four centuries. Called Keys To Community, the work was unveiled and dedicated on October 5, 2007.

In the summer of 2006, Old City residents Janet Kalter and Joe Schiavo had begun an effort to restore the park and return it to public use. After the new sculpture was dedicated, Kalter and Schiavo won the Fire Department's consent to restore the park's fountain. The work began in June 2008. "Armed with a welder’s hammer, the 5-foot-2, 105-pound Kalter chipped away at the fountain down to the raw concrete," the Inquirer wrote. The fountain was restored to operation in August, and the Fire Department formally returned the fountain to service in a Nov. 1 ceremony.

Kalter and Schiavo created an organization to support their efforts called Old City Green. In 2016, with financial assistance provided by Old City District, Old City Green spent about $50,000 to replace all the aging park furniture and seating area pavers, upgraded the fountain filtration and chlorination systems, and altered the park entrance walls and gate to present a more welcoming appearance.

In 2019, Old City Green proposed, funded, and executed a redesign of the north section of the park, expanding the garden perimeter, installing a central raised-planter feature, adding three benches, and replacing the lawn with a deep-bed crushed-brick surface. Kalter paid $70,000 out of pocket to fund the improvements. On the park's east wall, a mural was installed to depict the history of organized firefighting in Philadelphia and the founding of the Philadelphia Fire Department and subsequent supporting organizations. Designed by Eric Okdeh, it was funded by Mural Arts Philadelphia, the Philadelphia Fire Department, the PFD Family Association, and Wawa.
