= Mary Lum =

Subject of the play "The Insanity of Mary Girard" by Lanie Robertson

Mary Lum Girard (1758–1815) is known for being the wife of banker, philanthropist and merchant millionaire Stephen Girard. She is best known for having been imprisoned in the Pennsylvania Hospital's insanity ward for 25 years.

== Life ==
The exact details of Lum's early life remain unknown, with various authors describing it differently. Lum met Stephen Girard in early 1777 and the two entered a quick courtship, marrying on June 6, 1777. Girard, one of the wealthiest men in Colonial America, was 26 and Lum was 18 years old.At the outbreak of the Revolutionary War, the couple moved from Philadelphia to Mount Holly, New Jersey, from where they sold supplies to the Continental Army.

Sometime in the 1780s, Lum began suffering from mental illness, with Girard variously describing her ailment in letters as being "sickness" and "discontent." Girard became increasingly irritated at Lum's condition, describing it in 1785 as having placed limits on his business success. That same year, Girard became much more involved in his wife's treatment, sending her to stay with family in Lancaster for a period of time and trying other informal medicines. Girard attempted to send Lum away again in 1796, this time to his brother Jean, but Jean refused to accommodate her. Despite some improvement in her condition, Lum began a series of violent outbursts that led to a short commitment in Pennsylvania Hospital.

Upon her release, her condition continued to deteriorate and was likely exacerbated by Girard's failure to give her attention. In 1788 he became romantically involved with their housekeeper and forced her to live entirely separately from him. Living independently from Girard gave Lum more freedom but did not improve her condition and, after various other attempts at treatment failed, Lum was involuntarily committed to Pennsylvania Hospital in 1790. She stayed in the hospital for the next twenty-five years, the rest of her life.

In 1791, Lum gave birth to a daughter while in the hospital. Girard claimed no relationship with the child and the hospital refused to allow her to stay with Lum, instead moving her to a nurse's care. The girl died later that year. Benjamin Rush, one of Lum's physicians, wrote that the birth of her daughter initially improved her condition and that after the child's death Lum continued to mentally deteriorate. Lum died at the hospital in 1815 and was buried in an unmarked grave.

== Legacy ==
Lum's life inspired Lanie Robertson to write the play "The Insanity of Mary Girard." The play is one act and has been staged multiple times around the United States. In 1992, a Philadelphia-area retiree named Joseph Vendetti began researching Lum's life. He successfully advocated for the Girard College alumni association to purchase a tombstone for her and pushed Pennsylvania Hospital to place the tombstone on their grounds as a monument to Lum. The hospital rejected Vendetti's proposal multiple times, citing "the family's wishes" as their reasoning.
