= James Peniston =

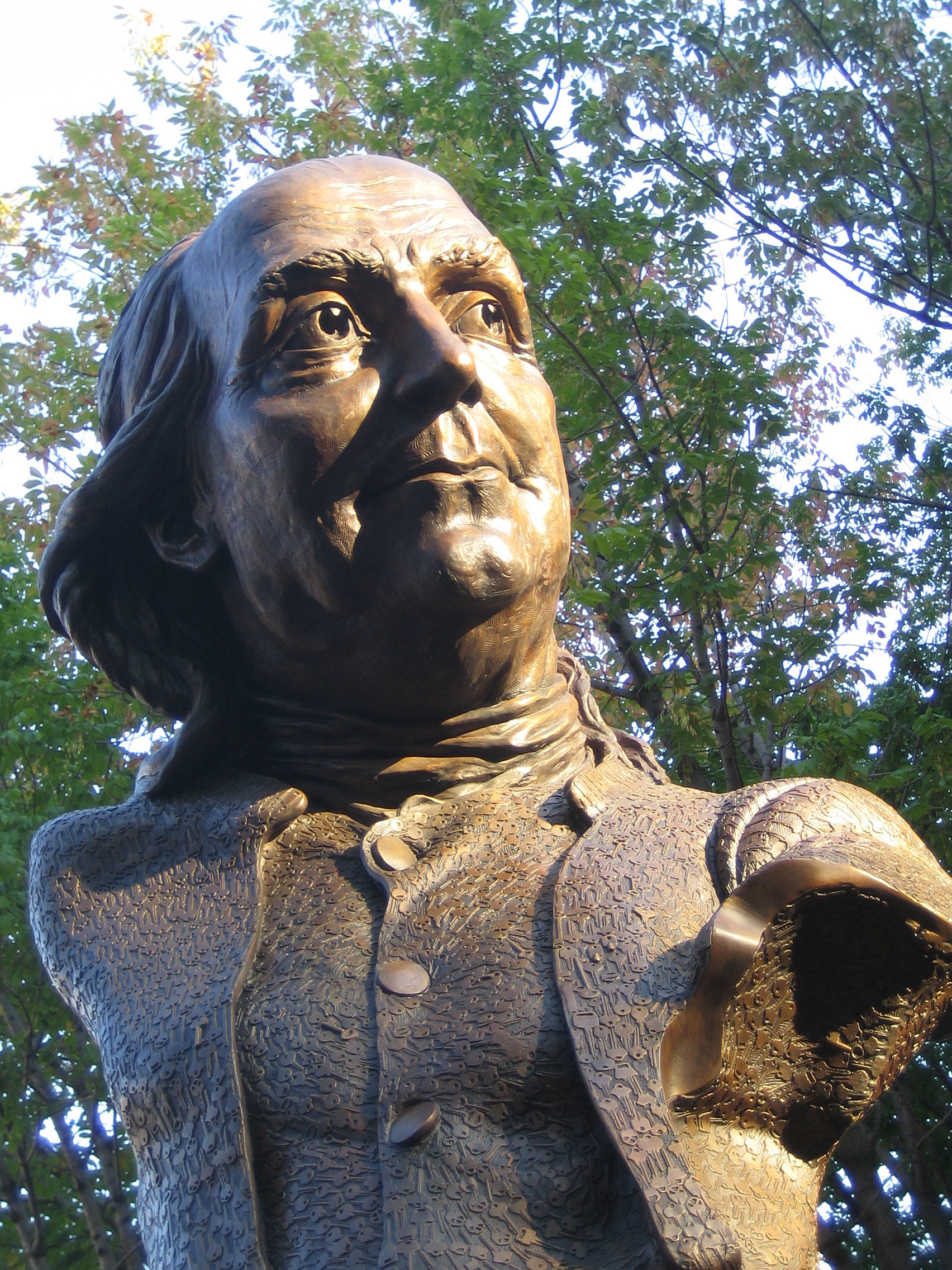
Peniston's 2007 Keys To Community stands in Girard Fountain Park in the Old City neighborhood of Philadelphia, Pennsylvania. Location: 39.952414°N 75.146301°W

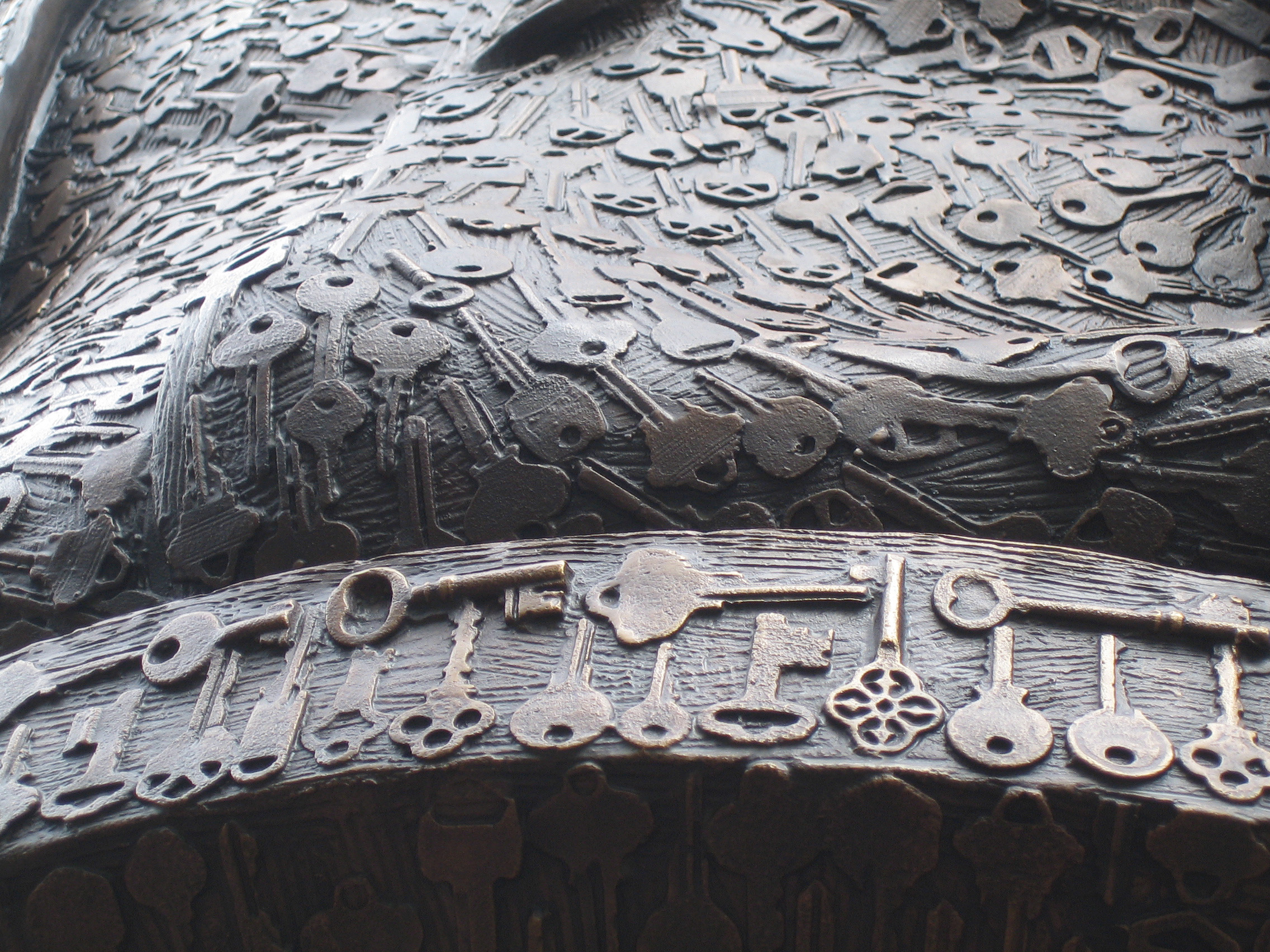
The surface of Keys To Community is textured with casts of about 1,000 keys donated by local schoolchildren.

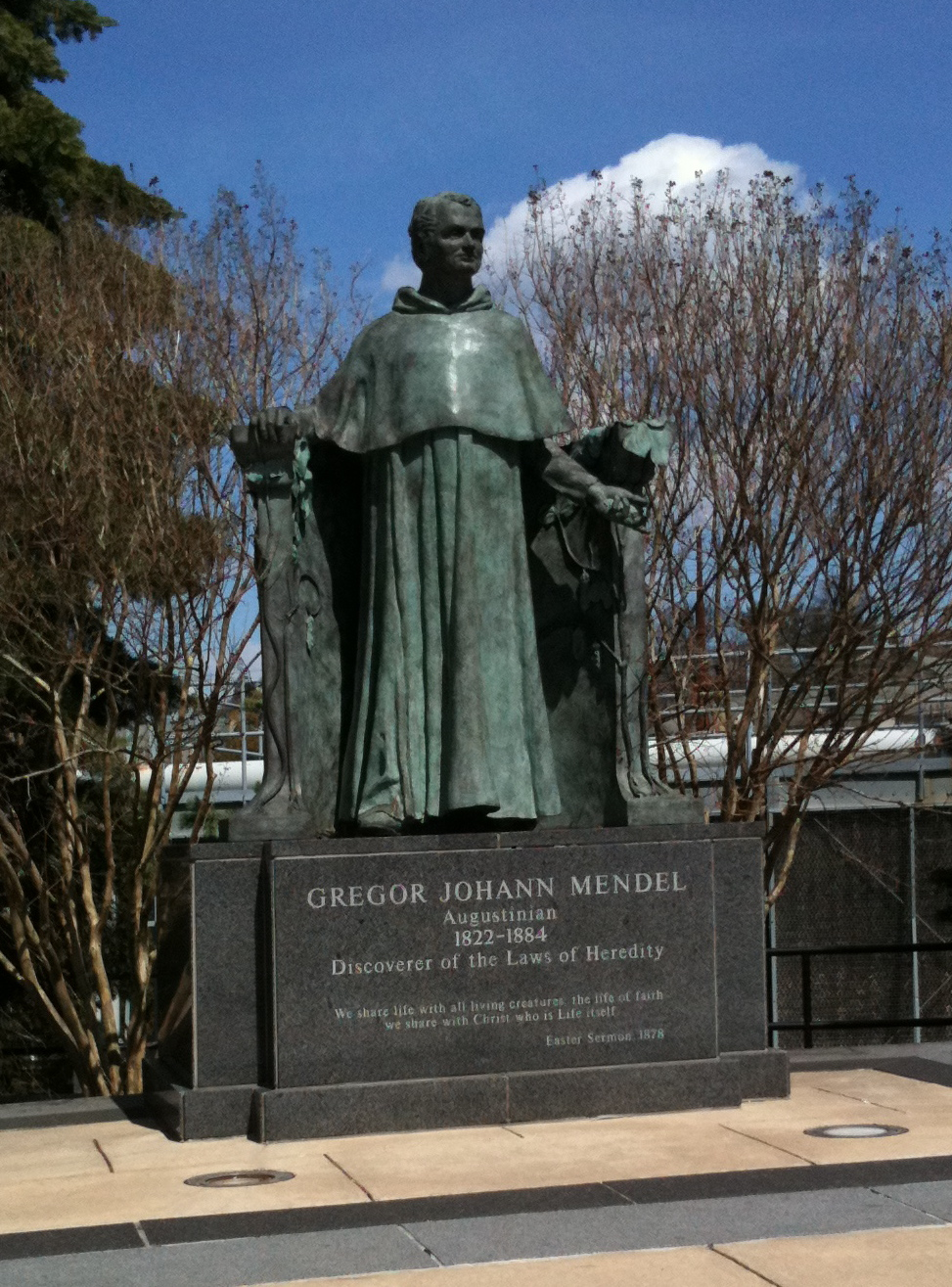
Peniston's 1998 Mendel stands by the science building at Villanova University outside Philadelphia.

James Peniston (born 1973) is an American sculptor whose monumental works in bronze include Gregor Mendel (1998), Keys To Community (2007), and American Pharoah (2017).

Peniston worked on the 2004 National World War II Memorial in Washington, D.C., for which he helped design the stainless-steel armature that holds up the bronze eagles and wreaths under the Atlantic and Pacific arches.

Peniston is also a cofounder and arts director of Studio 34: Yoga Healing Arts, a yoga and creative arts center in West Philadelphia, Pennsylvania.

== Works ==
Keys, a nine-foot bronze bust that portrays Benjamin Franklin turning to greet a visitor, sits at the front of Girard Fountain Park in the Old City neighborhood of Philadelphia, Pennsylvania. The sculpture was commissioned in 2003 by the city's arts agency and was unveiled and dedicated on October 5, 2007. It replaced Penny Franklin, an acrylic sculpture by Reginald E. Beauchamp that was covered with 80,000 pennies collected from local schoolchildren, and which had deteriorated and been removed. Peniston won the commission with a proposal that echoed the spirit of the older work. Over two years, the sculptor visited two dozen Philadelphia elementary schools, where he talked about Franklin's activities as a community-builder. He also asked the students to bring in a spare key to be worked into the sculpture, and ultimately collected more than 1,000 keys. "The keys, worked into the statue's surface, are meant to represent the role of community organizers, donors and volunteers in making projects around the city possible," wrote one local newspaper. Even more students became involved through a penny drive mounted by the Philadelphia Fire Department, which collected some 1.8 million pennies in 500 local schools to help fund the casting. The firefighters also added their own touch to the sculpture: When the molten bronze was poured for the work, they cast in brass nameplates representing fallen colleagues from four centuries of service.

Mendel, a seven-foot bronze statue that portrays pioneering geneticist Gregor Mendel holding a peapod, was commissioned by Villanova University, installed in 1998, and stands in the courtyard at the front of the university's Mendel Science Center.

American Pharoah, a life-sized bronze sculpture of the 2015 Triple Crown-winning racehorse and jockey Victor Espinoza, was commissioned by Charles Cella to commemorate the horse's two victories at Oaklawn Park in Hot Springs, Arkansas. In preparation for sculpting, Peniston visited and photographed the horse with the permission of trainer Bob Baffert. The sculpture was cast in 2017 at Laran Bronze outside Philadelphia and installed on January 11, 2018, at the entrance to Oaklawn's newly renovated grandstand. "James Peniston's full-scale, full-stride statue of American Pharoah [is] a perfect duplicate — down to its bulging muscles and veins — of the 3-year-old colt as he carried himself and jockey Victor Espinoza in the winter and spring of 2015 toward Triple Crown glory," the Arkansas Democrat-Gazette wrote.

In September 2026, the first section of Peniston's Thirty-Three Leaves, featuring monumental ginkgo leaves in bronze, was installed at John Burroughs School outside St. Louis, Missouri, joining a permanent collection that includes works by Willem De Kooning, Jasper Johns, Henry Moore, and others.
