= Old City Special Services District of Philadelphia =

Municipal authority in Philadelphia

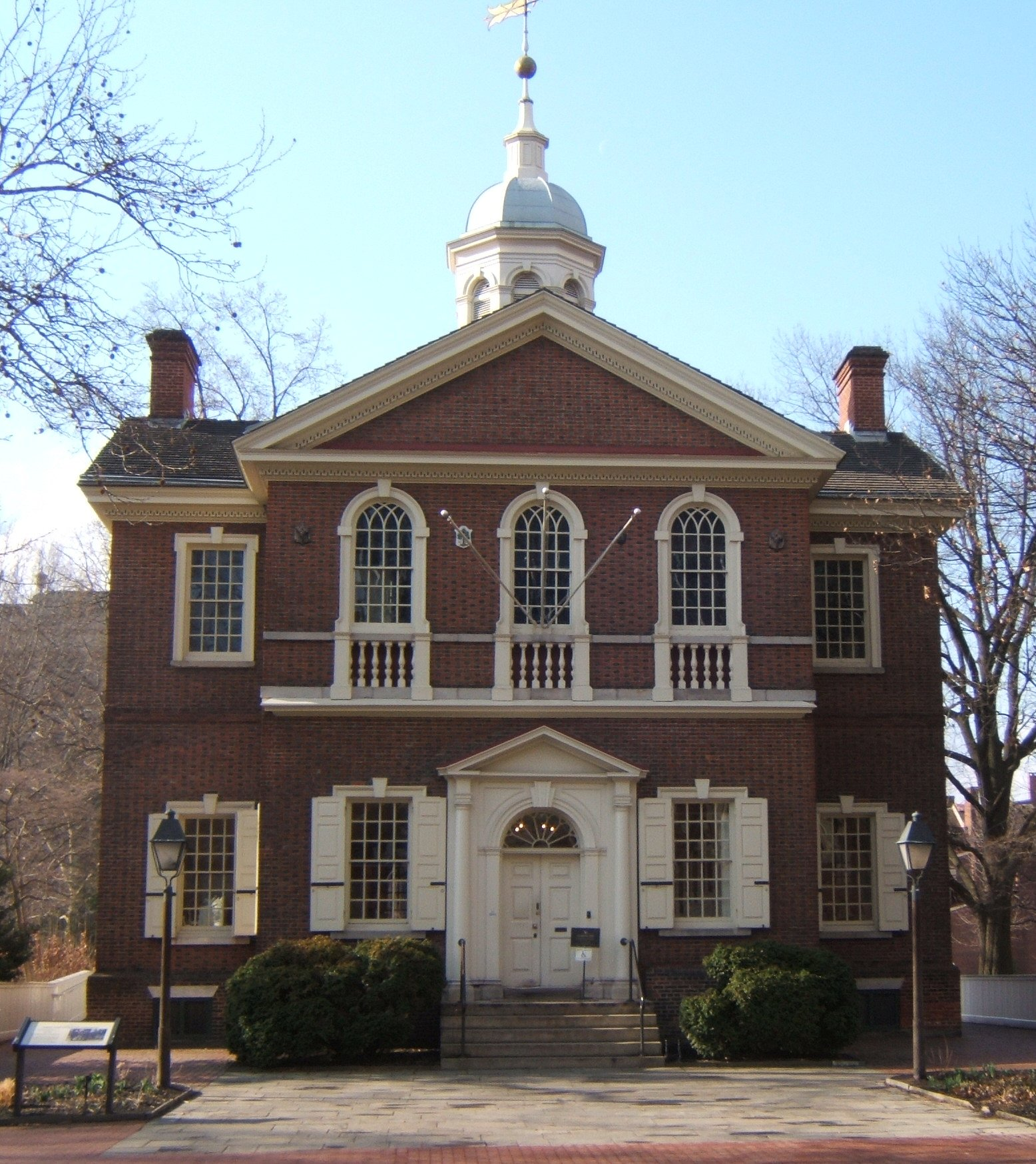
- Carpenters' Hall in Old City

Agency overview
- Formed: September 23, 1997
- Type: Municipal authority (Pennsylvania), a Business Improvement District
- Jurisdiction: The service area for Old City District includes the 22-block area bounded by Florist Street to the north, Walnut/Dock Streets to the south, 6th Street to the west and Front Street to the east.
- Headquarters: 231 Market Street; Philadelphia, PA 19106
- Employees: 4
- Agency executive: Job Itzkowitz, Executive Director
- Website: http://www.oldcitydistrict.org/

Old City Special Services District of Philadelphia is a municipal authority providing business improvement district services in the Old City neighborhood of Center City, Philadelphia.

== Services ==
=== Sidewalk cleaning ===
The Old City Special Services District has a program of sidewalk cleaning with uniformed crews to sweep and clean sidewalks with hand brooms during the day. These uniformed crews also remove graffiti from poles and signs. The District also encourages and responds to complaints about graffiti from the public. The Philadelphia Streets Department cleans the cart-ways from curb line to curb line and empties the public trash receptacles.

=== Security ===
The 6th Philadelphia Police District and the Old City Special Services District work together to improve safety and security for visitors, businesses and residents.

=== Marketing ===
To encourage and increase the commercial, retail, and cultural activities in the District, the Old City Special Services District supports marketing and promotional initiatives to enhance the public image of Old City. The official website is part of those initiatives.

=== Planning ===
The District has developed and implemented a streetscape improvement plan.

== Funding ==
Old City District is funded by an annual assessment charge on the assessed value of commercial properties within the District's boundaries.

== Administration ==
The Old City Special Services District Authority has a nineteen-member Board of Directors representing Old City's property owners, occupants, workers, and business owners. An executive director, who reports to the Board of Directors, manages the activities of the District and its operations.

== See also ==
- List of municipal authorities in Philadelphia
