= Don Stivers =

American artist (1926 - 2009)

- Born: Donald Ray Stivers; 1926
- Died: November 5, 2009 (aged 83)
- Occupation: artist
- Known for: historical and military subjects
- Notable work: depictions of Buffalo Soldiers, portrait of Civil War hero George Crawford Platt

Don Stivers (1926 – November 5, 2009) was an American artist, known for his portrayal of historical and military subjects.

== Biography ==
He was born Donald Ray Stivers in 1926 and raised in Superior, Wisconsin. During World War II, he served in the Navy in the Pacific. After his military service, he attended the California College of the Arts in San Francisco.

He was a member of the Loudoun Sketch Club. His art includes World War II scenes, Civil War scenes, and depictions of the American West. He is most known for his depictions of Buffalo Soldiers. His works are on display at military museums and bases, including the Pentagon, the U.S. Cavalry Museum, and the Army War College.

Stivers' portrait of Civil War hero George Crawford Platt is displayed at the National Gallery of Art in Washington, D.C.

He died on November 5, 2009, at the age of 83.
