= Stephen Girard =

French-born American banker and philanthropist (1750–1831)

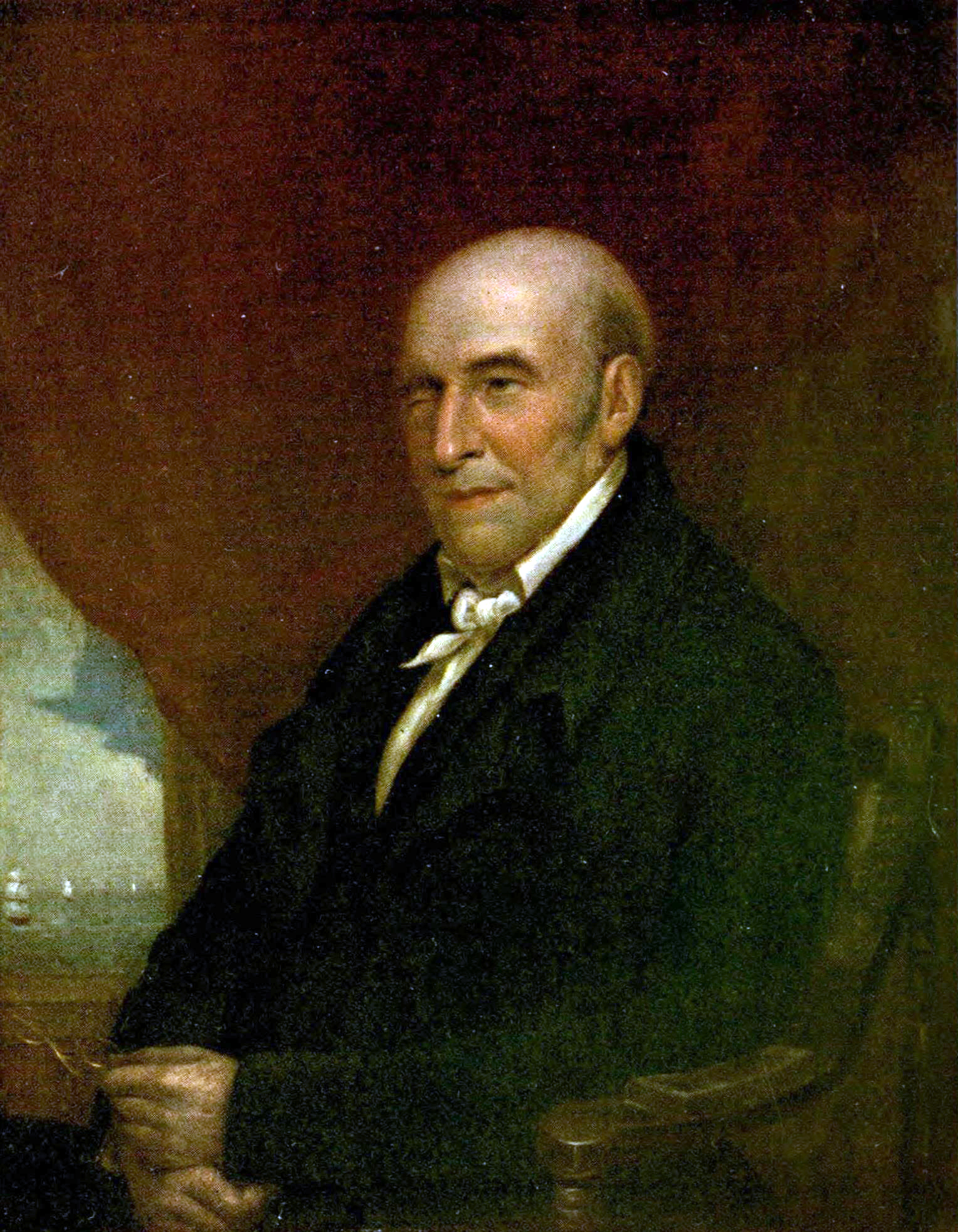
- Born: Étienne Girard; May 20, 1750; Bordeaux, France
- Died: December 26, 1831 (aged 81); Philadelphia, Pennsylvania, U.S.
- Occupation: Banker

Stephen Girard (born Étienne Girard; May 20, 1750 – December 26, 1831) was a French-born American banker and philanthropist. Born in Bordeaux, Girard subsequently immigrated to the Thirteen Colonies where he established himself in the American banking industry. During the War of 1812, Girard single-handedly saved the federal government of the United States from bankruptcy by personally financing the American war effort.

Eventually accumulating a large estate which included a slave plantation in Louisiana, which was managed by Henry Bry, his friend and colleague from Ouachita Parish, Girard was, according to a 2007 article in Fortune Magazine the fourth-richest American in history. Having no children, Girard devoted much of his fortune to philanthropy, in particular the education and welfare of orphans, and his estate continues to fund philanthropic endeavors in the present day.

== Early life ==
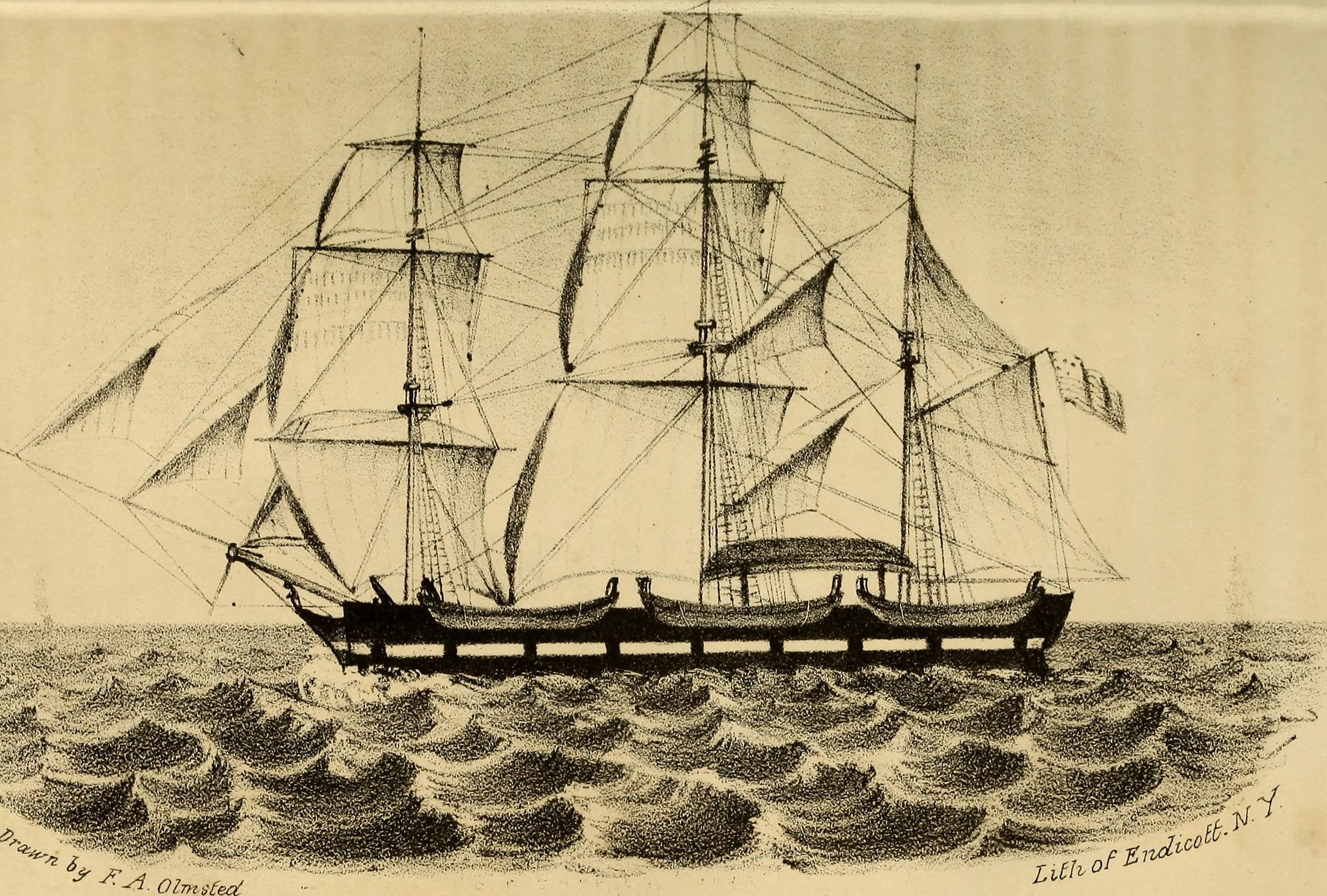
North America, a barque built by Stephen Girard (circa 1816)

Girard was born in Bordeaux, France, on May 20, 1750, the son of a sea captain. He lost the sight in his right eye at the age of eight and had little education. In 1760, he travelled to the colony of New York as a cabin boy and stayed there, working in the coastal trader system along the east coast and as far south as the Caribbean. He was licensed as a captain in 1773, visited New York in 1774, and with the assistance of a New York merchant began to trade to and from New Orleans and Port au Prince. In May 1776, after the outbreak of the American Revolutionary War, Girard sailed into the port of Philadelphia to avoid a group of Royal Navy warships and settled there, running a grocery and liquor shop. In 1783, Stephen's brother John Girard left him with a slave, a woman in her twenties named Hannah, during a visit from Saint-Domingue.^{:89-91} Pennsylvania's 1780 Act for the Gradual Abolition of Slavery had many loopholes and although it was amended throughout Girard's life, Hannah remained his slave until his death in 1831. An 1828 listing of taxable inhabitants reported that she was the only enslaved person in Philadelphia at that time.

By 1790, Girard had a fortune of $6,000 and a small fleet of trading vessels. In 1791, his merchantmen in the former colony of Saint-Domingue were involved in salvaging goods owned by French planters during the Haitian Revolution. He was left with $10,000 of goods stowed on his ships, the owners of which were likely massacred. Because the owners of the goods were not found, Girard added the goods to his possessions. He also participated in the Old China Trade, financing voyages to Canton. These voyages profited Girard through the sale of legitimate goods as well as opium, which was smuggled into China. Girard's business ventures in China ended in 1824 following an incident between one of his ships, the Terranova, and Chinese authorities.

== Marriage ==
In 1776, Girard met Mary Lum, a Philadelphia native nine years his junior. They married soon afterwards, and Girard purchased a home at 211 Mill Street in Mount Holly Township, New Jersey. Mary was the daughter of John Lum, a shipbuilder who died three months before the marriage. In 1778 Girard became a resident of Pennsylvania. By 1785 Mary had begun succumbing to sudden, erratic emotional outbursts. Mental instability and violent rages ensued, leading to a diagnosis of incurable mental instability. Though Girard was initially devastated, by 1787 he took a mistress, Sally Bickham. In August 1790 Girard committed his wife to the Pennsylvania Hospital (today part of the University of Pennsylvania) as an incurable lunatic, providing her every luxury for comfort. During this time she gave birth to a girl whose sire is not entirely certain. The child, baptized with the name Mary, died a few months later while under the care of Mrs. John Hatcher, who had been hired by Girard as a nurse. Girard spent the remainder of his life with mistresses.

== Yellow fever ==
In 1793, there was an outbreak of yellow fever in Philadelphia. Although many other well-to-do citizens chose to leave the city, Girard stayed to care for the sick and dying. He supervised the conversion of a mansion outside the city limits into a hospital and recruited volunteers to nurse victims, and personally cared for patients. For his efforts, Girard was feted as a hero after the outbreak subsided. Again during the yellow fever epidemic of 1797–1798 he took the lead in relieving the poor and caring for the sick.

== Girard's Bank ==
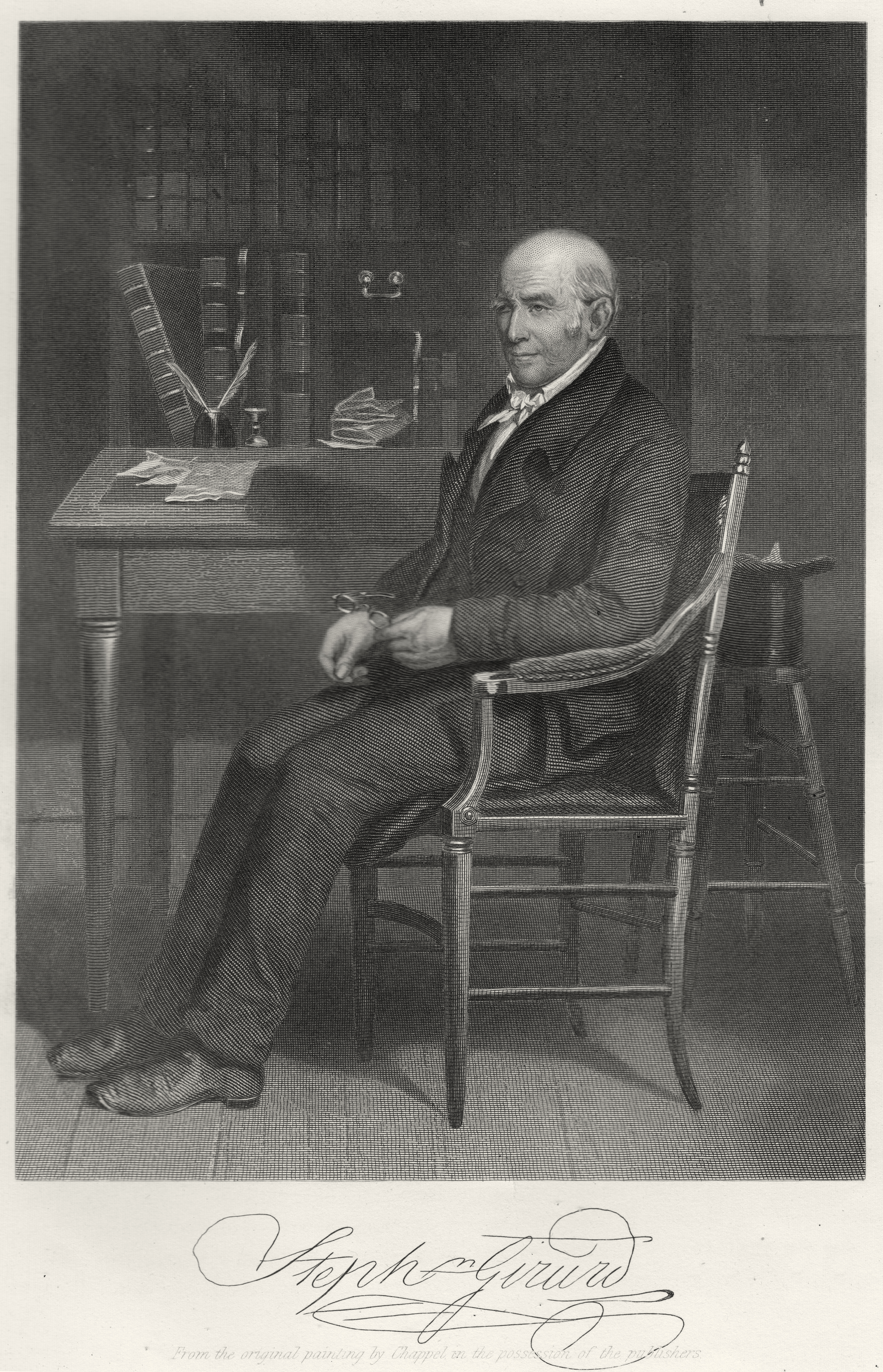
Steel engraving of Stephen Girard by Alonzo Chappel

After the charter for the First Bank of the United States expired in 1811, Girard purchased most of its stock and its facilities on South Third Street in Philadelphia, and reestablished it under his direct personal ownership. He hired George Simpson, the cashier of the First Bank, as cashier of the new bank, and with seven other employees opened for business on May 18, 1812. He allowed the Trustees of the First Bank of the United States to use some offices and space in the vaults to continue the process of winding down the affairs of the closed bank at a very nominal rent. Although Pennsylvania law prohibited an association of individuals from banking without a charter, it made no such prohibition on a single individual doing so. Philadelphia banks balked at accepting the notes that Girard issued on his personal credit and lobbied the state to force him to incorporate, without success.

Girard's Bank was the principal source of government credit during the War of 1812, worth an outstanding $1 million. Towards the end of the war, when the financial credit of the U.S. government was at its lowest, Girard placed nearly all of his personal resources at the disposal of the government and underwrote up to 95 percent of the war loan issue, which enabled the United States to carry on the war. After the war, he became a large stockholder in and one of the directors of the Second Bank of the United States.

Girard's Bank ceased operations upon his death in 1831, but Philadelphia businessmen, eager to cash in on Girard's reputation, opened a bank called the Girard Trust Company, and later Girard Bank. It merged with Mellon Bank in 1983, and was largely sold to Citizens Bank two decades later. Its monumental headquarters building still stands at Broad and Chestnut Streets in Philadelphia.

== Death, will and legacy ==
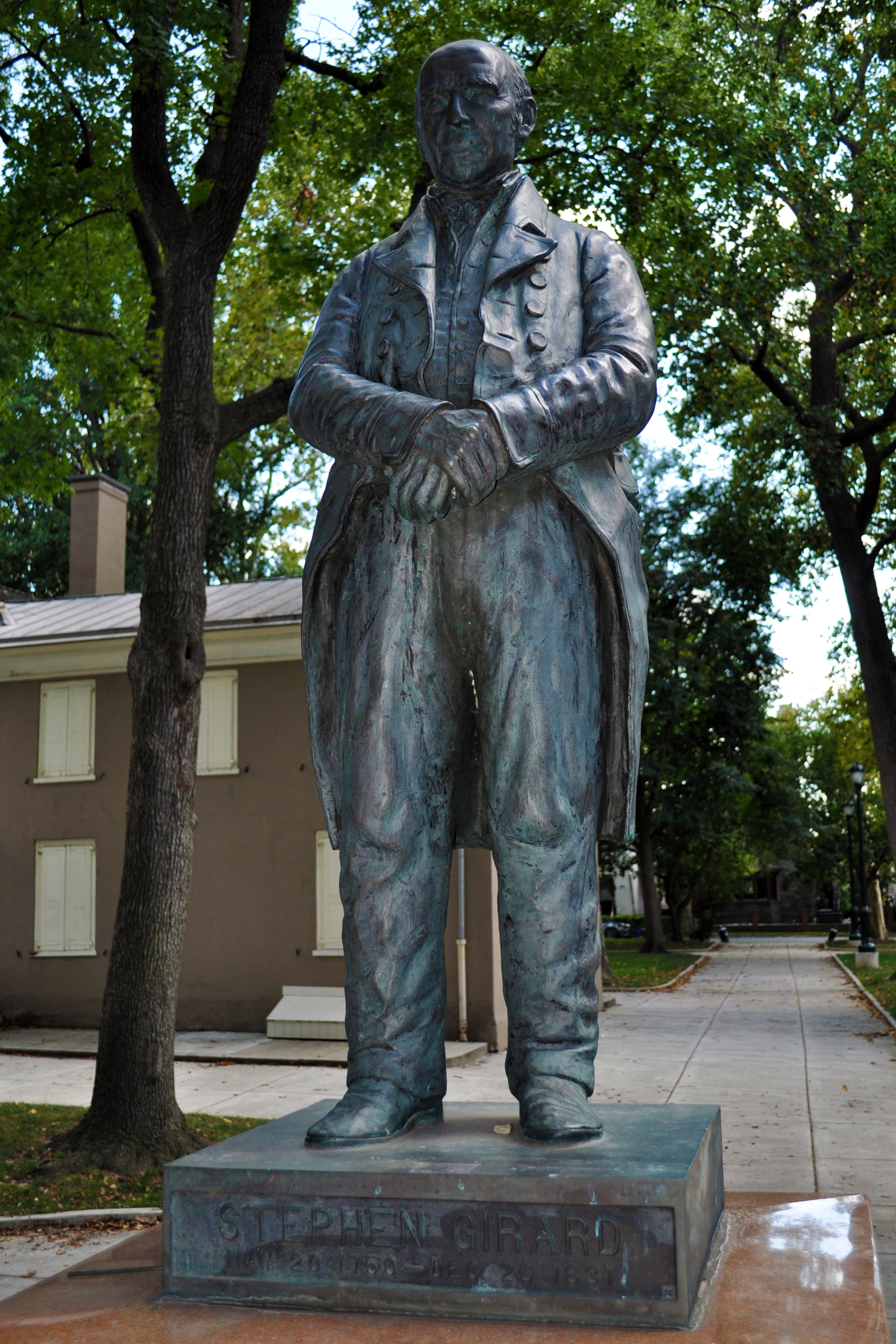
Statue in Stephen Girard Park, Philadelphia, Pennsylvania

On December 22, 1830, Stephen Girard was seriously injured while crossing the street near Second and Market Streets in Philadelphia. He was knocked down by a horse and wagon, and one of its wheels ran over the left side of his face, lacerating his cheek and ear as well as damaging his good (left) eye. Despite his advanced age of 80 years old, he got up unassisted and returned to his nearby home, where a doctor dressed his wound. He threw himself back into his banking business, although he remained out of sight for two months. Nevertheless, Girard never fully recovered and he died on December 26, 1831. He was buried in the vault he built for his nephew in the Holy Trinity Catholic cemetery, then at Sixth and Spruce Streets. Twenty years later, his remains were re-interred in the Founder's Hall vestibule at Girard College behind a statue by Nicholas Gevelot, a French sculptor living in Philadelphia.

At the time of his death, Girard was the wealthiest man in America. Michael Klepper and Robert Gunther, in their book The Wealthy 100, posit that, with adjustment for inflation, Girard was the fifth-wealthiest American of all time as of 1996, behind John D. Rockefeller, Andrew Carnegie, Cornelius Vanderbilt, and John Jacob Astor. He was worth around $7.5 million at the time of his death, equal to $255.9 million today.

Girard's will was contested by his family in France but was upheld by the U.S. Supreme Court in a landmark case, Vidal et al. vs Girard's Executors, 43 U.S. 127 (1844).

He bequeathed nearly his entire fortune to charitable and municipal institutions of Philadelphia and New Orleans, including an estimated $6 million (approximately $175 million in 2024) for establishing a boarding school for "poor, male, white orphans" in Philadelphia, primarily those who were the children of coal miners, which opened as Girard College in 1848.

Girard also made a bequest of $10,000 to the public schools of Philadelphia, with the income from its investment to be used for the purchase of books for the school libraries, and a bequest for the establishment of funds to procure medals for deserving pupils.

To his friend the Judge Henry Bry, he bequeathed the usufruct for 20 years of the plantation he owned in Louisiana, including thirty slaves.

When Girard's former counting house on 22 North Water Street near the corner of Front and Market Streets was demolished in 1907, a set of underground cells were uncovered. At the time of discovery, it was alleged that the cells were used to incarcerate slaves.

Although no longer in common use, people used to use the phrase "Stephen Girard work" or "Stephen Girard job" to refer to useless work. Girard did not believe in idleness, and in a time when people were loath to take handouts, he instead would pay for useless work. An example is paying workers to move bricks from one side of a yard to another (and then back again).

== Homages ==
A number of places are named after Stephen Girard:

- Girard Avenue is a major east–west thoroughfare of North Philadelphia and West Philadelphia and the location of Girard College.
- The neighborhood now known as Girard Estate is part of what was a successful farm that he established in the late 1700s, and includes the Stephen Girard Park where his "country mansion" still stands.
- Girard Fountain Park is in the Old City neighborhood of Philadelphia, in which a sculpture of Benjamin Franklin is displayed.
- The borough of Girardville, Schuylkill County, is located roughly 110 miles northwest of Philadelphia, bordered by many acres of land still connected to the Girard Estate.
- Stephen Girard Avenue is located in the Gentilly area of New Orleans.
- The town of Girard, Pennsylvania is located in Erie County, roughly 450 miles northwest of Philadelphia. It was named for him in 1832.
- The community of Girard, Louisiana, is in Richland Parish, where Girard financed and oversaw the startup of a plantation managed by his friend and agent, Henry Bry, in 1821.
- A Liberty ship was built and christened USS Stephen Girard in 1942.
- Girardsville, a town in Schuylkill County.

== See also ==
- Stephen Simpson (writer), a former employee at Girard's Bank and author of the book Biography of Stephen Girard, with His Will Affixed (1832), which is very critical of Girard
- List of richest Americans in history
- War of 1812
- Meredith Calhoun, a former assistant
