= George C. Platt Bridge =

George C. Platt Memorial Bridge
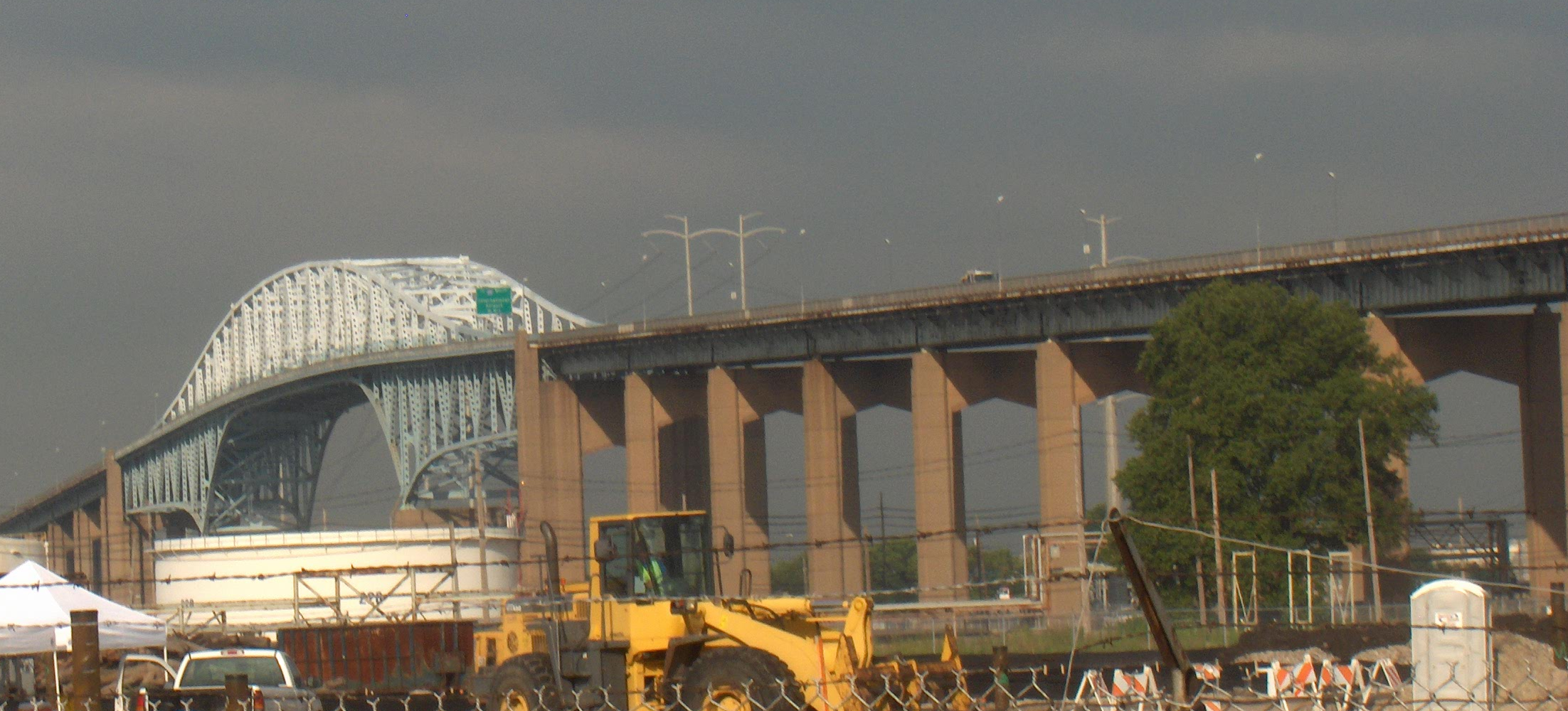
- Platt Bridge, looking south
- Coordinates: 39°53′53″N 75°12′42″W
- Carries: 4 lanes of PA 291 (Penrose Avenue)
- Crosses: Schuylkill River
- Locale: Philadelphia, Pennsylvania
- Official name: George C. Platt Memorial Bridge
- Maintained by: PennDOT

Characteristics
- Design: through truss bridge
- Total length: 8,780 feet (2,680 m)
- Width: 48 feet (15 m)
- Longest span: 680 ft (207 m)
- Clearance above: 17.5 feet (5.3 m)

History
- Construction start: Late 1940s
- Construction end: Early 1950s
- Opened: 1951

Statistics
- Daily traffic: 56,000
- Toll: free

Location
- Interactive map of George C. Platt Memorial Bridge

The George C. Platt Memorial Bridge is a through truss bridge that carries PA 291 (Penrose Avenue) over the Schuylkill River in Southwest Philadelphia, Pennsylvania. It was opened to traffic in 1951, replacing a swing bridge to the south which carried Penrose Ferry Road across the river. Originally called the Penrose Avenue Bridge, it was renamed in 1979 to honor Civil War hero George Crawford Platt (1842–1912). Today, the Platt Bridge is a key arterial route which carries an average of 56,000 vehicles daily.

In 1967, a steel dividing wall was installed to separate eastbound from westbound traffic lanes. The lack of a barrier led to more than 30 head-on collisions on the bridge between 1964 and 1967. The coming wall was announced by the State Highway Department on November 15, 1967.

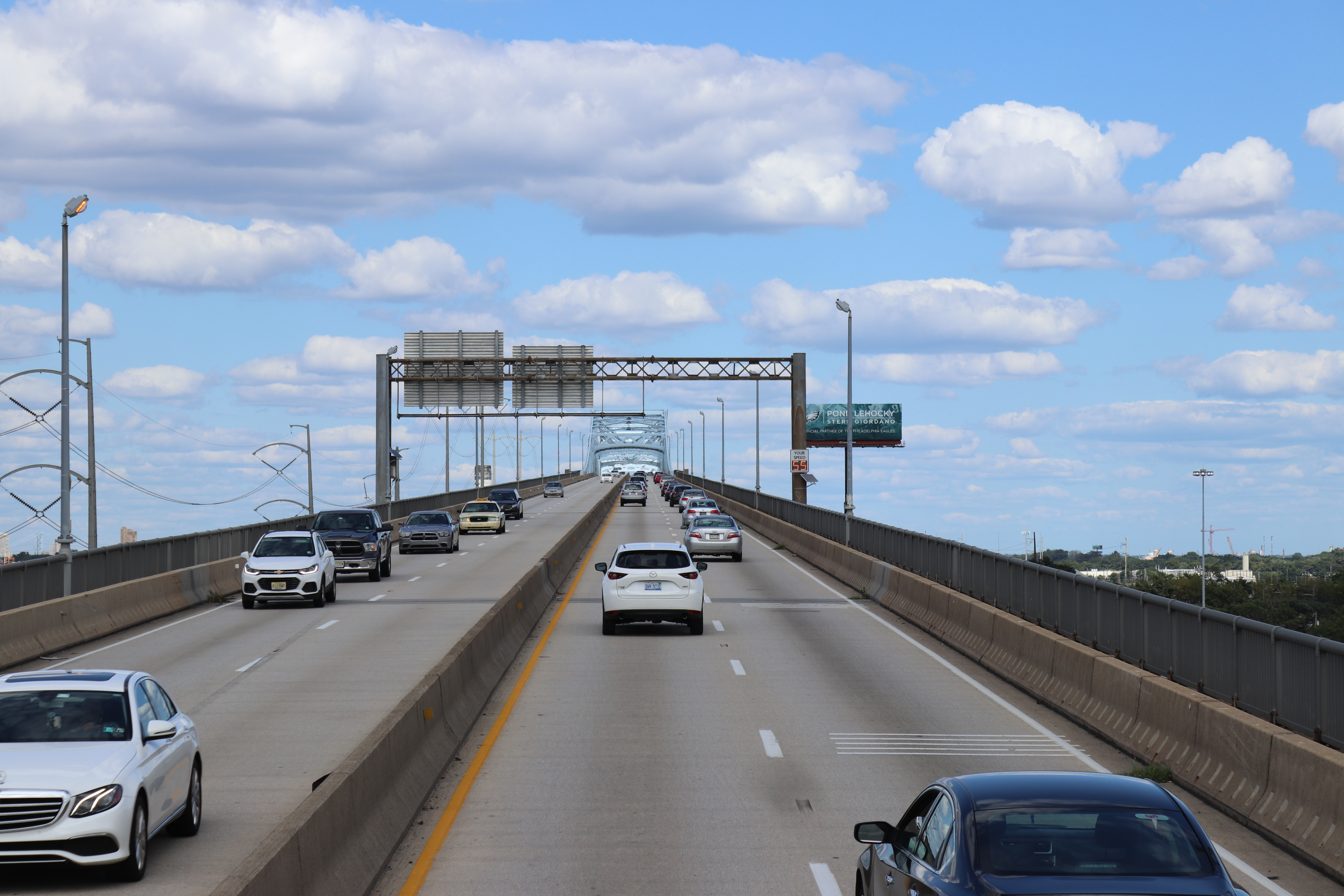
A view from the roadway on the bridge.

The bridge once passed over an oil refinery (originally owned by Gulf Oil, then by ARCO, then Sun Oil and last by Philadelphia Energy Solutions). Fires at the refinery have several times imperiled the bridge and even closed it for several hours during the 1975 Philadelphia Gulf refinery fire. On August 17, a fire began in a tank to the northeast of the bridge that was being filled with Venezuelan crude oil. As the fire enveloped much of the refinery, several explosions put a large crack in a smokestack next to the bridge. Officials closed the bridge for several hours, fearing that the stack might collapse or the fire might damage the bridge. Eight firefighters died fighting the fire.

In 1986, two bronze bas-reliefs of Platt's visage were mounted on poles at each end of the bridge. The works were commissioned by Platt's great-great-grandson, Lawrence Griffin Platt, who raised $10,000 with the help of a former Gulf Oil executive, and were sculpted by Philadelphia artist Reginald E. Beauchamp. Both were later stolen, the first in 1987, and the second some time later. A $500 reward offered by the Philadelphia Daily News in 2002 was unsuccessful in securing their return.

In June 2011, PennDOT began a three-year, $42.8 million rehabilitation project to repair and maintain the bridge, enabling it to continue to safely carry vehicular and pedestrian traffic for decades to come. Crews painted the bridge's steel truss and structural steel underneath the spans to protect them from the elements. They also rehabilitated and resurfaced the center truss spans; resurfaced concrete approach spans; repair structural steel; replaced or improved expansion joints; repaired concrete piers; repaired and replaced guide rail; and replaced damaged pedestrian railings. During construction, the bridge's four lanes were reduced to two; one in each direction. From May 7, 2012, until the completion of construction in June 2014, trucks and buses weighing more than seven tons or carrying hazardous material were banned from using the bridge to minimize the risk of accidents on one-lane sections.

By 2018, the new paint started to peel away from areas of the superstructure above the deck, and the exposed metal began to rust.

== See also ==
- List of crossings of the Schuylkill River
