= George Crawford Platt =

American Civil War Medal of Honor recipient

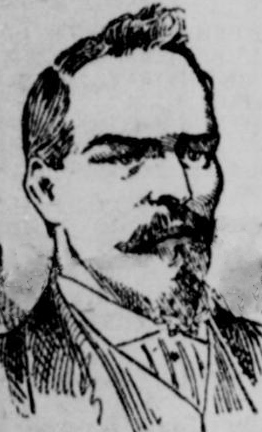
- Platt in 1888
- Born: February 17, 1842; Derry, Ireland
- Died: June 20, 1912 (aged 70); Philadelphia, Pennsylvania
- Burial place: Holy Cross Cemetery, Yeadon, Pennsylvania
- Military career
- Allegiance: United States of America
- Branch: United States Army (Union Army)
- Service years: 1861–1864
- Rank: Sergeant
- Unit: 6th US Cavalry
- Conflicts: American Civil War: Battle of Williamsburg; Siege of Yorktown; Battle of Hanover Court House; Battle of Charleston (1862); Battle of Chancellorsville; Stoneman's 1863 Raid; Battle of Brandy Station; Battle of Middleburg; Battle of Upperville; Battle of Gettysburg; Battle of Todd's Tavern; Battle of Trevilian Station; Second Battle of Deep Bottom
- Awards: Medal of Honor

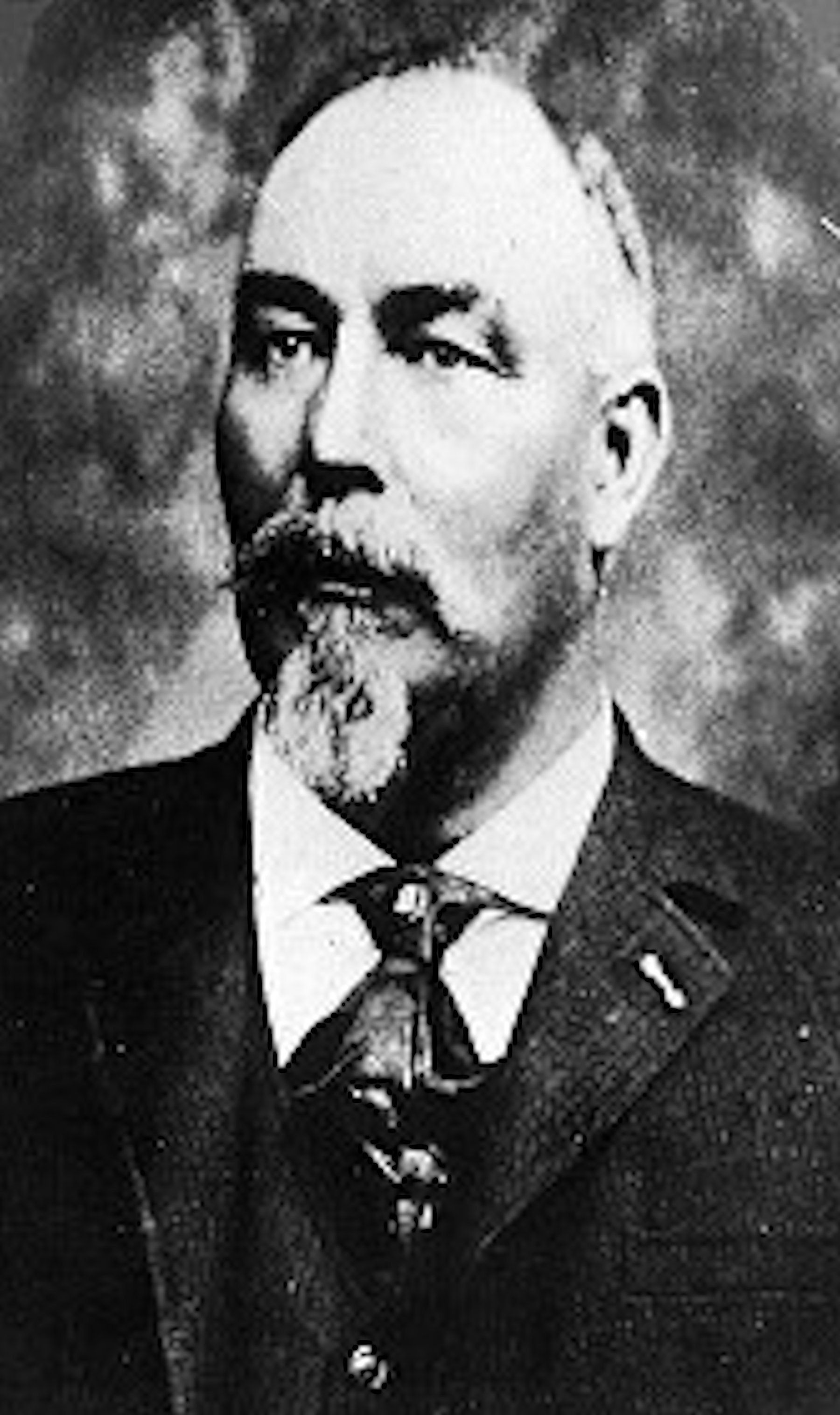
George Crawford Platt c. 1890

George Crawford Platt (February 17, 1842 – June 20, 1912) was an Irish soldier who served with the federal army of the United States (also known as the Union Army) during the American Civil War. A private with Troop H of the 6th U.S. Cavalry, he was awarded the Medal of Honor, America's highest award for valor in combat, for protecting the American flag in hand-to-hand combat near Fairfield, Pennsylvania, during the Battle of Gettysburg on July 3, 1863.

== Formative years ==
Born in Derry, Ireland, on February 17, 1842, George Crawford Platt was a son of Robert Platt and Martha (Kilgil) Platt, who were also both natives of Ireland. After spending his early childhood in Ireland, George Platt then emigrated sometime around 1851, and settled in Philadelphia, Pennsylvania.

== Civil War ==
Platt responded to President Abraham Lincoln's call for volunteers following the fall of Fort Sumter to Confederate States Army troops in mid-April 1861. After enlisting for a three-year term of military service in Philadelphia on August 5 of that year, Platt officially mustered in that same day as a private with Troop H of the 6th U.S. Cavalry.

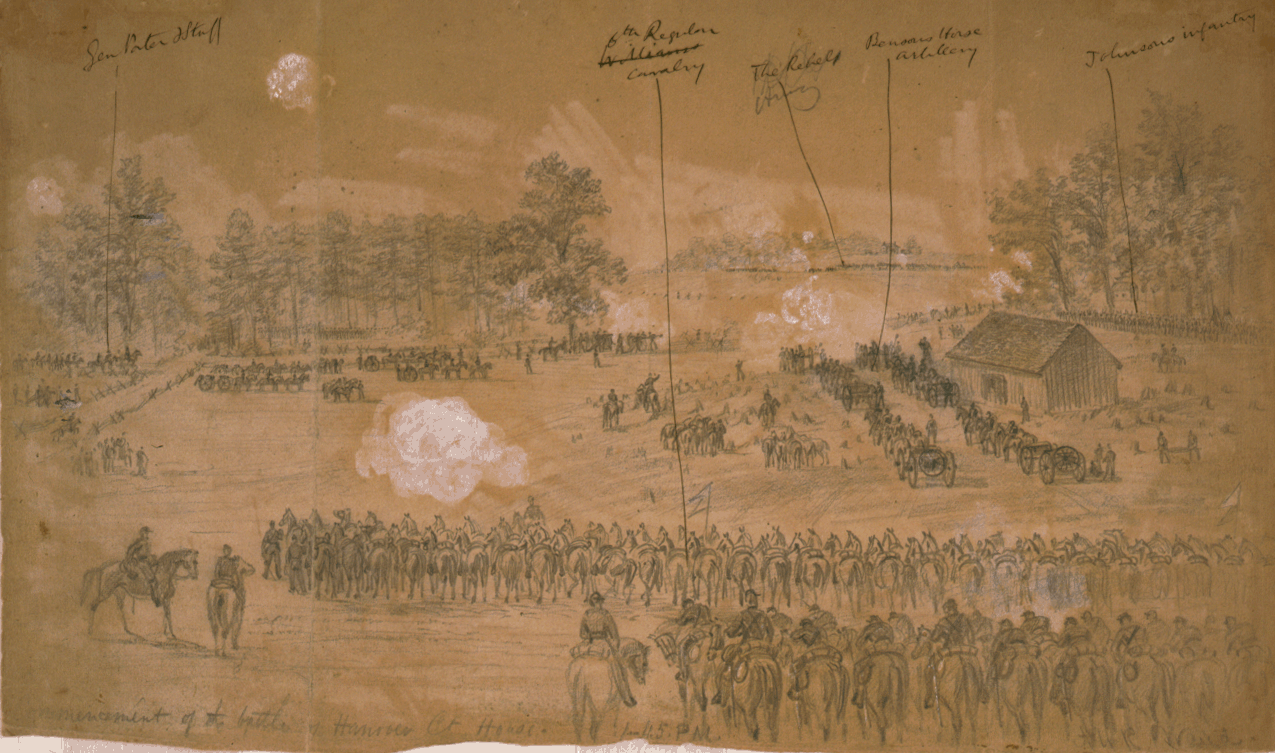
Battle of Hanover Court House, May 27, 1862 (Alfred Waud illustration with handwritten notes on position of 6th U.S. Cavalry)

Transported with his regiment to Bladensburg, Maryland, on September 12, he was equipped with a sabre and pistol, put through basic training and then assigned, with his regiment, to duties related to the defense of Washington, D.C., until March 10, 1862, when the 6th U.S. Cavalry was moved, by way of Fairfax Court House, Centreville, Manassas, Bull Run, and Alexandria, Virginia, to Fortress Monroe. Attached to the Army of the Potomac, the 6th U.S. Cavalrymen were then assigned to the Peninsula Campaign. After fighting in the Battle of Williamsburg (May 5), they participated in the Siege of Yorktown and other interactions with the enemy during the spring and early summer of 1862, including operations at Mechanicsville (May 24) and the Battle of Hanover Court House (May 27). Facing off against the forces of Confederate General J.E.B. Stuart in June, they then participated in Union operations at Falls Church, Sugar Loaf Mountain, and Middletown, the Battle of Charleston, the Leesburg expedition, and operations at Waterford, Charleston, Hillsboro, Philamont, Uniontown, Upperville, Barber's Cross Roads, Amosville, and the Rappahannock. Stationed at Belle Plain from November 24 until December 12, they then marched toward Fredericksburg, engaged briefly with the enemy, and made camp near Falmouth the following day.

Attached in February 1863 to the 3rd Brigade of the 1st Cavalry Division, which was under the command of Brigadier-General John Buford, they next fought in the Battle of Chancellorsville (April 30–May 6), Stoneman's 1863 raid, and the battles of Brandy Station (June 9), Middleburg (June 17–19), and Upperville (June 21) before being ordered north to Pennsylvania.

While fighting with his regiment during day three of the Battle of Gettysburg (July 3, 1863), Platt performed the act of valor for which he would later be awarded the U.S. Medal of Honor. Assigned with his regiment to attack Confederate States Army supply wagons near Fairfield, Pennsylvania, and prevent the possible retreat of CSA troops from the major fields of battle in and around Gettysburg, the 6th Cavalrymen encountered a significantly larger force from the 6th, 7th and 11th Virginia Cavalry, and were quickly forced into hand-to-hand combat. Retrieving the American flag after his regiment's color-bearer was killed, Platt fought off the enemy in order to prevent that flag from falling into enemy hands.

Afterward, Platt and the 6th Cavalry continued to pursue the enemy, and re-engaged with Confederate troops at Funkstown (July 7), Boonsboro (July 8–9), and Funkstown again (July 10). According to Captain William Carter, U.S. Army, "The service of the [6th U.S. Cavalry] during the period between the action at Beverly Ford and the last affair at Funkstown was one of incessant marching and fighting, and although nearly decimated by the casualties of action, the brave little band hung on to Lee's army with a courageous tenacity." Stationed in Germantown, Maryland, from August 8–September 12, Platt and the 6th U.S. Cavalry fought again with the enemy at Brandy Station, Culpeper, and Centreville before settling into winter quarters. Still stationed in Virginia during the spring of 1862, they resumed major actions against the enemy during the Battle of Todd's Tavern (May 7), and then engaged in the raid on Richmond (beginning May 9), the Battle of Trevilian Station (June 11–12), and the Second Battle of Deep Bottom (August 14–20).

Platt and other members of the 6th U.S. Cavalry were then detailed to service as the body guard for Union Major-General Philip H. Sheridan, a duty he performed only briefly. With his initial three-year term of service set to expire before the end of the summer, Platt opted to muster out honorably on August 5.

== Post-war life ==
Following his honorable discharge from the military in August 1864, Platt returned home to Philadelphia, where he wed Pennsylvania native Eliza Kelly. Working as a huckster in 1870, he resided in Philadelphia's 7th Ward with his wife and their Pennsylvania-born children: Robert, Edward, Martha, and Margaret. Employed as a ship's carpenter by 1880, his Philadelphia household had grown to include children: Levina/Levinia, George C., Elizabeth, and Ellen. A son, William Henry, did not survive infancy. Son Frank arrived in July 1882.

By 1888, the elder George Platt was employed as a contractor. A naturalized citizen of the United States by 1910, George Platt continued to reside in Philadelphia with his wife, Eliza. Still living with them was 44-year-old son, Edward. Post-war, Platt was also an active member of the Grand Army of the Republic.

== Death and interment ==
On June 20, 1912, Platt died from endocarditis in Philadelphia, Pennsylvania, at the age of 70. He was then buried in Holy Cross Cemetery in Yeadon, Pennsylvania, on June 24.

== Medal of Honor citation and other honors ==
Platt was initially honored for his gallantry during the American Civil War with the United States' highest award for valor in combat — the U.S. Medal of Honor. His citation reads:

Seized the regimental flag upon the death of the standard bearer in a hand-to-hand fight and prevented it from falling into the hands of the enemy.

In 1979, the George C. Platt Bridge (formerly known as the Penrose Avenue Bridge), in southwest Philadelphia, was renamed in his honor. Platt's great-grandson, Lawrence Griffin Platt, led the effort to have the bridge renamed.

A painting of Platt by Don Stivers is displayed in the National Gallery of Art in Washington, D.C.

== See also ==
- List of Medal of Honor recipients for the Battle of Gettysburg
- List of American Civil War Medal of Honor recipients: M–P
- Irish Americans in the American Civil War
- Pennsylvania in the American Civil War
