= List of gangsters by city =

This list includes gangsters and organized crime figures by area of operation/sphere of influence. Some names may be listed in more than one city.

== Australia ==
=== Melbourne ===
- Alphonse Gangitano (1957-1998)
- Graham "The Munster" Kinniburgh (1942-2003)
- Tony Mokbel
- Jason Moran (1967-2003)
- Lewis Moran (1941-2004)
- Mark Moran (1964-2000)
- Nikolai Radev (1959-2003)
- Squizzy Taylor (1888-1927)
- Andrew "Benji" Veniman (1975-2004)
- Carl Williams (1970-2010)

=== Sydney ===
- George Freeman (1935-1990)
- Michael Kanaan
- Lenny McPherson (1921-1996)
- Abraham Saffro (1919-2006)

== Canada ==
=== Blairmore ===
- Florence Lassandro (1900–1923)
- Emilio Picariello (1875 or 1879–1923)

=== Bradford ===
- Giuseppe Ursino

=== Guelph ===
- Tony Sylvestro

=== Hamilton ===
- Agueci brothers
- Carmen Barillaro (1944–1997)
- Giacomo Luppino (1900–1987)
- Enio Mora (1949–1996)
- Kenneth Murdock (born 1963)
- Angelo Musitano (1978–2017)
- Pat Musitano (1968–2020)
- Johnny Papalia (1924–1997)
- Rocco Perri (1887–disappeared 1944)
- Santo Scibetta
- Bessie Starkman (1889 or 1890–1930)
- Domenico Violi (born 1966)
- Giuseppe Violi (born 1970)

=== Mississauga ===
- Vincenzo DeMaria (born 1954)

=== Montreal ===
- Francesco Arcadi (born 1964)
- Richard Blass (1945–1975)
- Maurice Boucher (1953–2022)
- Alfonso Caruana (born 1946)
- Frank Cotroni (1931–2004)
- Vincenzo Cotroni (1911–1984)
- Harry Davis (1898–1946)
- Francesco Del Balso (1970–2023)
- Raynald Desjardins (born 1953)
- Juan Ramon Fernandez (1956–2013)
- Lorenzo Giordano (1963–2016)
- Antonio Macrì (1902–1975)
- Salvatore Montagna 1971–2011)
- Sabatino Nicolucci (born 1946/47)
- Monica Proietti (1940–1967)
- Paolo Renda (1939–declared dead in 2018 after missing since 2010)
- Leonardo Rizzuto (born 1968/69)
- Nicolo Rizzuto (1924–2010)
- Vito Rizzuto (1946–2013)
- Frank Ryan (1942–1984)
- Gerlando Sciascia (1934–1999)
- Réal Simard (born 1951)
- Rocco Sollecito (1948–2016)
- Paolo Violi (1931–1978)

=== Niagara Falls ===
- Carmen Barillaro (1944–1997)
- Nick Nero (born 1977)

=== Toronto ===
- Agueci brothers
- Salvatore Calautti (1971 or 1972–2013)
- Martino Caputo (born 1973)
- Howard Chard (1924–1983)
- Giuseppe Coluccio (born 1966)
- Cosimo Commisso (born 1950)
- Raffaele Delle Donne (born 1967 or 1968)
- Cecil Kirby (born 1950)
- Antonio Macrì (1902–1975)
- Salvatore Miceli (born 1946)
- Michele Modica (born 1955)
- Gaetano Panepinto (1959–2000)
- Roberto Pannunzi (born 1948)
- Johnny Papalia (1924–1997)
- Domenic Racco (1950–1983)
- Michele Racco (1913–1980)
- Johnny Raposo (1977–2012)
- Norman Ryan (1895–1936)
- Pietro Scarcella (born 1950)
- Asau Tran (1952 or 1953–1991)
- Paul Volpe (1927–1983)
- Dean Michael Wiwchar (born 1986)
- Rocco Zito (1928–2016)

=== Vancouver ===
- Rabih Alkhalil
- Bindy Johal (1971–1998)

=== Winnipeg ===
- Michael Sandham (born 1970)
- Danny Wolfe (1976–2010)
- Richard Wolfe (1975–2016)

=== Woodbridge ===
- Carmelo Bruzzese (born 1949)
- Salvatore Calautti (1971 or 1972–2013)
- Alfonso Caruana (born 1946)
- Antonio Commisso (born 1956)
- Raffaele Delle Donne (born 1967 or 1968)
- Angelo Figliomeni
- Pietro Scarcella (born 1950)
- Carmine Verduci (1959–2014)

== Colombia ==
=== Cali ===
- Gilberto Rodríguez Orejuela (1939-2022)
- Miguel Rodríguez Orejuela
- Mery Valencia

=== Medellín ===
- José Abello Silva (born 1954)
- Griselda Blanco (1943-2012)
- Pablo Escobar (1949-1993)
- Carlos Lehder Rivas
- Fabio Ochoa Restrepo (1924-2002)
- Jorge Luis Ochoa Vásquez
- José Gonzalo Rodríguez Gacha (1947-1989)

== Ireland ==
=== Dublin ===
- Martin Cahill, "The General" (1949–1994)
- John Gilligan, "Factory John" (born 1952)
- Gerry Hutch, "The Monk" (born 1963)
- Daniel Kinahan
- Christy Kinahan

== Israel ==
=== Netanya ===
- Asi Abutbul

=== Tel Aviv ===
- Yaakov Alperon (1955-2008)
- Zeev Rosenstein

== Italy ==
=== Naples ===
- Raffaele Amato (born 1965)
- Patrizio Bosti (born 1959)
- Edoardo Contini (born 1955)
- Giuseppe Dell'Aquila (born 1962)
- Paolo Di Lauro (born 1953)
- Cosimo Di Lauro (born 1973)
- Marco Di Lauro (born 1980)
- Ketty Gabriele (born 1981)
- Maria Licciardi (born 1951)
- Vincenzo Licciardi (born 1965)
- Salvatore Lo Russo (born 1953)
- Francesco Mallardo (born 1951)
- Cesare Pagano (born 1969)

=== Salerno ===
- Francesco Matrone (1947-2023)

=== Siderno ===
- Vincenzo DeMaria (born 1954)
- Giuseppe Coluccio (born 1966)
- Cosimo Commisso (born 1950)
- Antonio Macrì (1902–1975)
- Roberto Pannunzi (born 1948)
- Michele Racco (1913–1980)
- Carmelo Bruzzese (born 1949)
- Antonio Commisso (born 1956)
- Carmine Verduci (1959–2014)

=== Oppido Mamertina ===
- Saverio Mammoliti (born 1942)

=== Gioia Tauro ===
- Girolamo Piromalli (1918–1979)

== Japan ==
=== Tokyo ===
- Hisayuki Machii (1923–2002)

=== Yokohama ===
- Kakuji Inagawa (1914–2007)
- Susumu Ishii (1924–1991)

== Malaysia ==
- Bentong Kali (1961–1993), birth name Kalimuthu Pakirisamy
- Wong Swee Chin (1951–1981), nicknamed Botak Chin

== Mexico ==
=== Ciudad Juárez ===
- Amado Carrillo Fuentes (1956–1997)
- Vicente Carrillo Fuentes (born 1963)
- Rafael Aguilar Guajardo (died 1993)
- Pablo Acosta Villarreal (died 1987)

=== Guadalajara ===
- Javier Barba-Hernandez (died 1986)
- Rafael Caro Quintero (born 1952)
- Juan José Esparragoza Moreno (1949-2014)
- Ernesto Fonseca Carrillo (born 1942)
- Juan Matta-Ballesteros (born 1945)

=== Matamoros ===
- Juan Nepomuceno Guerra (1915–2001)
- Juan García Ábrego (born 1944)
- Osiel Cárdenas Guillén (born 1967)
- Antonio Cárdenas Guillén (1962–2010)
- Jorge Eduardo Costilla Sánchez (born 1971)
- Arturo Guzmán Decena (1976–2002)
- Mario Cárdenas Guillén
- Rafael Cárdenas Vela

=== Nuevo Laredo ===
- Miguel Treviño Morales (born 1970)
- Alejandro Treviño Morales (born 1974)
- Iván Velázquez-Caballero (born 1970)
- José Treviño Morales

=== Reynosa ===
- Samuel Flores Borrego (1972–2011)
- Jaime González Durán (born 1971)
- Mario Ramírez Treviño (born 1962)

=== Tijuana ===
- Ramón Arellano Félix (1962–2002)
- Benjamín Arellano Félix (born 1952)
- Francisco Rafael Arellano Félix (1949–2013)
- Carlos Arellano Félix (born 1955)
- Francisco Javier Arellano Félix (born 1969)
- Enedina Arellano Félix (born 1961)
- Edgardo Leyva Escandón (born 1969)
- Luis Fernando Sánchez Arellano (born 1977)

== Netherlands ==
=== Amsterdam ===
- Hüseyin Baybaşin (born 1956)
- Roland Tan (1948–2020), founding member of Ah Kong

== Puerto Rico ==
=== San Juan ===
- Martinez Familia Sangeros
- Tony Tursi (1901–1989)

=== Caguas ===
- Edsel Torres Gomez

== Russia ==
=== Moscow ===
- Sergey Mikhaylov
- Semion Mogilevich (born 1946)

=== Saint Petersburg ===
- Vladimir Kumarin (born 1958)

== Singapore ==
- Aw Teck Boon (1956–1999)
- Tan Chor Jin (1966–2009), nicknamed the "One-Eyed Dragon"

== Sweden ==
=== Gothenburg ===
- Denho Acar (born 1974)

== Turkey ==
=== Ankara ===
- Dündar Kılıç (1935–1999)

=== Istanbul ===
- Nurullah Tevfik Ağansoy (1960–1996)
- Alaattin Çakıcı (born 1953)
- Abdullah Çatlı (1956–1996)
- Sedat Peker (born 1971)
- Mahmut Yıldırım (born 1951)
- Kürşat Yılmaz

== United Kingdom ==
=== Liverpool ===
- Tommy "Tacker" Comerford (1933–2003)
- Paul Grimes (born 1950)
- John Haase (born 1948)
- Sean Mercer
- Michael Showers (born 1945)
- Curtis "Cocky" Warren (born 1963)
- Anthony Whitney
- Gary Whitney
- Paul Whitney
- John Kinsella (criminal)
- Vincent Coggins
- Francis Coggins
- Ian Fitzgibbon
- Jason Fitzgibbon
- Peter Clarke
- Stephen Clarke
- Colin “Smigger” Smith

=== London ===
- Terry Adams (1954–)
- Patrick Adams (1956–)
- Tommy Adams (1958–)
- Ronnie Biggs (1929–2013)
- Christopher Brayford (1965–)
- Jack Comer (1912–1996)
- George Cornell (1928–1966)
- Dave Courtney (1959–2023)
- Bobby Cummines (1951–)
- Albert Dimes (1914–1972)
- Buster Edwards (1931–1994)
- Freddie Foreman (1932–2026)
- Frankie Fraser, "Mad Frankie" (1923–2014)
- Mickey Green (1942–2020)
- William Hill (1911–1984)
- David Hunt (1961–)
- Carlton Leach
- Ronnie Knight (1934–2023)
- Kray twins (Reggie Kray 1933–2000; Ronnie Kray 1933–1995)
- Mark Lambie
- Tony Lambrianou (1942–2004)
- Lenny McLean (1949–1998)
- David McMillan (1956–)
- Jack McVitie, "Jack the Hat" (1932–1967)
- Kenneth Noye (1947–)
- Wilf Pine (1944–2018)
- Joey Pyle (1937–2007)
- Bruce Reynolds (1931–2013)
- The Richardson Gang, Charlie and Eddie Richardson
- Roy Shaw (1936–2012)
- Alf White (1887–1942)
- Charlie Wilson (1932–1990)
- Gilbert Wynter (1961–1998)

=== Birmingham ===
- Michael Michael
- John Palmer (criminal) (1950-2015)

=== Manchester ===
- Desmond Noonan (1959–2005)
- Dominic Noonan (born 1964)
- Anthony "White Tony" Johnson (1969–1991)
- Lee Amos
- Colin Joyce
- Dale Cregan

=== Salford ===
- Paul Massey (gangster) (1960–2015)
- Mark Fellows (hitman)

=== Middlesbrough ===
- Brian Charrington (born 1956)

=== Essex ===
- Tony Tucker (1957–1995)
- Patrick Tate (1958–1995)
- Craig Rolfe (1969–1995)
- Harry Roberts

=== Glasgow ===
- Paul Ferris (Scottish writer)
- Arthur Thompson
- Tam McGraw
- Ian McAteer

=== Widnes ===
- Shaun Attwood

== United States ==
=== Boston ===
- Gennaro Angiulo (1919–2009)
- Joe Barboza (1932–1976)
- James J. Bulger, "Whitey" (1929–2018)
- Arthur Doe, Jr. (1960–2018)
- Stephen Flemmi (born 1934)
- Vincent Flemmi (1935–1979)
- Jimmy Flynn (1934-2022)
- Donald Killeen (1923–1972)
- Johnny Martorano (born 1940)
- Bernard McLaughlin (1921–1961)
- Edward McLaughlin (died 1965)
- Paul McGonagle (1939–1974)
- James McLean (1929–1965)
- Patrick Nee (born 1943)
- James O'Toole (1929–1973)
- Alex Rocco (1936–2015)
- Frank Salemme (1933-2022)
- Charles Solomon (1884–1933)
- Vincent Teresa (1930–1990)
- Kevin Weeks (born 1956)
- Howie Winter (1929–2020)

=== Buffalo ===
- Albert Agueci (1922–1961)
- Vito Agueci
- Peter Magaddino (1917–1976)
- Stefano Magaddino (1891–1974)
- Joseph E. Todaro, "Lead Pipe Joe" (1923–2012)
- Frank Valenti (1911–2008)

=== Chicago ===
- Tony Accardo, Antonino "Joe Batters", "Big Tuna" (1906–1992)
- Joseph Aiuppa, "Joey Doves" (1907–1997)
- Felix Alderisio, "Milwaukee Phil" (1912–1971)
- Harry Aleman (1939–2010)
- Gus Alex, "Gussie", "Mr. Ryan" (1916–1998)
- Louis Alterie, Leland A. "Two Gun" Varain (1886–1935)
- Samuzzo Amatuna, "Smoots" (1899–1925)
- Joseph Andriacchi (1932–2024)
- Donald Angelini, "The Wizard of Odds" (1926–2000)
- Dominick Basso (1938–2001)
- Sam Battaglia, "Teets" (1908–1973)
- James Belcastro (1895–1945)
- Fifi Buccieri (1907–1973)
- Frank Buccieri, "The Horse" (1919–2004)
- Marshall Caifano (1911–2003)
- Frank Calabrese, Sr. (1937–2012)
- Frank LaPorte, "Frankie" (1901–1972)
- Nicholas Calabrese (1942–2023)
- Al Capone, Alphonse "Big Al", "Scarface" (1899–1947)
- Frank Capone, Salvatore (1895–1924)
- Ralph Capone, Raffaele James "Bottles" (1894–1974)
- Sam Cardinelli, [Cardinella] (1869–1921)
- Samuel Carlisi (1914–1997)
- Anthony Centracchio (1929–2001)
- Jackie Cerone, "Jackie the Lackey" (1914–1996)
- Eco James Coli (1922–1982)
- James Colosimo, "Big Jim" (1878–1920)
- Dominic Cortina (1925–1999)
- William Daddano, Sr., "Willie Potatoes" (1912–1975)
- Marco D'Amico (1936–2020)
- William Dauber (1935–1980)
- Mario Anthony DeStefano (1915–1975)
- Sam DeStefano, "Mad Sam" (1909–1973)
- John DiFronzo, "No Nose" (1928–2018)
- John Dillinger (1903–1934)
- Vincent Drucci, "Schemer" (1898–1927)
- Terry Druggan, "Machine Gun" (1903–1954)
- Ken Eto, "Joe the Jap", "Tokyo Joe", "Montana Joe" (1919–2004)
- Joseph Ferriola (1927–1989)
- Rocco Fischetti (1903–1964)
- Louis Fratto, "Lew Farrell", "Cockeyed Louie" (1907–1967)
- Sam Giancana, "Momo", "Mooney" (1908–1975)
- Joseph Glimco, Joey, "Tough Guy", Joseph Glinico, Joseph Glielmi, "Little Tim Murphy" (1909–1991)
- Jake Guzik, "Greasy Thumb" (1886–1956)
- Murray Humphreys (1899–1965)
- Joseph Lombardo, Sr., "Joey The Clown" (1929-2019)
- James Marcello, "Jimmy the Man" (born 1943)
- Louis Marino (1932-2017)
- Jack McGurn, "Machine Gun," Vincenzo Antonio Gibaldi (1902–1936)
- Bugs Moran (1893–1957)
- Charles Nicoletti, "Chuckie", "The Typewriter" (1916–1977)
- Frank Nitti, "The Enforcer" (1886–1943)
- Dean O'Banion (1892–1924)
- Ross Prio (1901–1972)
- Paul Ricca, "The Waiter" (1897–1972)
- John Roselli (1905–1976)
- Frank Rosenthal, "Lefty" (1929–2008)
- Michael Sarno (born 1958)
- Gerald Scarpelli (1938–1989)
- Frank Schweihs [Schwehis], "The German" (1932–2008)
- Anthony Spilotro, "Tony the Ant," "Tough Tony" (1936–1986)
- Michael Spilotro (1944–1986)
- Victor Spilotro (1933–1996)
- Al Tornabene, "Pizza Al" (1923–2009)
- John Torrio, "The Brain"; "The Fox"; "Pappa Johnny" (1882–1957)
- Frankie Yale (1893–1928)
- Frank Zito (1893–1974)

=== Cleveland ===
- Danny Greene (1933–1977)
- James "Jack White" Licavoli (1904–1985)
- John Nardi (1916–1977)
- Alfred "Big Al" Polizzi (1900–1994)
- John "John Scalise" Scalish (1912–1976)
- Frank Milano (1891–1970)
- Joseph "Big Joe" Lonardo (1884–1927)
- Salvatore "Black Sam" Todaro (1885–1929)
- John "Peanuts" Tronolone (1910–1991)
- Anthony "Tony" Milano (1888–1978)
- Angelo "Big Ange" Lonardo (1911–2006)

=== Dallas ===
- Joseph Civello (1902–1970)

=== Detroit ===
see Purple Gang

- Salvatore Catalanotte (1894–1930)
- Anthony Giacalone, "Tony Jack" (1919–2001)
- Kwame Kilpatrick (born 1970)
- Vincent Meli (1921–2008)
- Joseph Zerilli (1897–1977)

=== Galveston ===
- Rosario Maceo (1887–1954)
- Sam Maceo (1894–1951)
- George Musey (1900–1935)
- Johnny Jack Nounes (1890–1970)
- Ollie Quinn (1893-1949)
- Dutch Voight (1888-1986)

=== Kansas City ===
- Charles Binaggio (1909–1950)
- William "Willie the Rat" Cammisano, Sr. (1914–1995)
- Anthony "Tiger" Cardarella (1926–1984)
- Charles V. "Charley The Wop" Carrollo (1902–1979)
- Anthony Civella (1930–2006)
- Carl "Cork" Civella (1910–1994)
- Giuseppe Nicoli "Nick" Civella (1912–1983)
- Frank DeMayo (1885–1949)
- Charles "Mad Dog" Gargotta (1900–1950)
- Anthony "Tony" Gizzo (1902–1953)
- Nicolo Impostato (1906–1979)
- John Lazia (1896–1934)
- Gaetano Lococo (1895–1993)
- Tom Pendergast (1873–1945)
- Peter Simone (1945-2025)

=== Las Vegas ===
- Charles Baron, "Babe" (1920s-1960s)
- David Berman, "Davie the Jew" (1903–1957)
- Herbert Blitzstein, "Fat Herbie" (1934–1997), representing the Chicago Outfit
- Marshall Caifano, representing the Chicago Outfit (1911–2003)
- Frank Cullotta, "The Las Vegas Boss" (1938-2020), representing the Chicago Outfit
- Gus Greenbaum (1894–1958), representing the Chicago Outfit
- John Roselli (1905–1976), representing the Chicago Outfit
- Frank Rosenthal, "Lefty" (1929–2008)
- Irving Shapiro, "Slick" (1904-1931)
- Benjamin Siegel, "Bugsy" (1906–1947)
- Anthony Spilotro, "Tony the Ant"; "Little Guy" (1938–1986), representing the Chicago Outfit
- Michael Spilotro, "Micky" (1944–1986), representing the Chicago Outfit
- Joseph Stacher, "Doc" (1902–1977)

=== Los Angeles ===
- Girolamo Adamo, "Momo" (1884–1956)
- Joseph Ardizzone, "Iron Man" (1884–1931)
- Frank Bompensiero, "Bomp" (1905–1977)
- Dominic Brooklier (1914–1984)
- Frank Buccieri (1919–2004)
- Jimmy Caci, "Jimmy" (1925–2011)
- Frank DeSimone (1909–1967)
- Rosario DeSimone, "The Chief" (1873–1946)
- Vito Di Giorgio (1880–1922)
- Joseph Dippolito, "Joe Dip" (1914–1974)
- Jack Dragna (1891–1956)
- Louis Tom Dragna (1920–2012)
- Tom Dragna (1899–1977)
- Jimmy Fratianno, "Jimmy the Weasel" (1913–1993)
- Nicholas Licata (1897–1974)
- Carmen Milano, "Flipper" (1929–2006)
- Peter Milano (1925–2012)
- Michael Rizzitello, "Mike Rizzi" (1929–2005)
- Simone Scozzari, "Sam" (1900-1980)
- Joseph Sica (1911–1992)
- Johnny Stompanato (1925–1958)
- Mickey Cohen (1913–1976)
- Rene Enriquez (born 1962)
- Joe Morgan, "Pegleg" (1929–1993)

=== Milwaukee ===
- Felix Alderisio, (1912–1971) "Milwaukee Phil"
- Frank Balistrieri (1918–1993)

=== Minneapolis–Saint Paul ===
- Isadore Blumenfeld, “Kid Cann” (1900–1981)
- Danny Hogan, “Dapper” (c. 1880–1928)
- A. A. Ames, “Doc” (1842–1911)
- David Berman (1903–1957)

=== New Jersey ===
- Joseph Abate (1902-1996)
- Philip Abramo, "The King Of Wall Street" (born 1945)
- Anthony Accetturo, "Tumac" (born 1938)
- Jose Miguel Battle, Sr. (1930–2007) "El Padrino" Former Godfather of "The Corporation" (a.k.a. The Cuban Mafia)
- Ruggiero Boiardo, "Richie the Boot" (1890–1984)
- Salvatore Briguglio, "Sally Bugs" (1930-1978)
- Anthony Capo, "Tony" (1959/1960–2012)
- Antonio Caponigro, "Tony Bananas" (Philadelphia family member based in North Jersey) (1912–1980)
- Gerardo Catena, "Jerry" (1902–2000)
- Angelo DeCarlo, "Gyp" (1902–1973)
- Sam DeCavalcante, "The Plumber" (1912–1997)
- Lawrence Dentico, "Larry Fab" (born 1923)
- John DiGilio (1932–1988)
- Vincent Palermo, "Vinny Ocean" (born 1944)
- Angelo Prisco, "The Horn" (1939-2017)
- Marco Reginelli (Philadelphia family member based in South Jersey) (1897–1956)
- Giovanni Riggi, "John the Eagle" (1925–2015)
- Nicodemo Scarfo, "Little Nicky" (Philadelphia family member based in Atlantic City) (1929–2017)
- Giuseppe Schifilliti, "Pino" (born 1938)
- Gaetano Vastola, "Corky" (born 1928)
- Abner Zwillman, "Longie", "Al Capone of New Jersey" (1904–1959)

=== New Orleans ===
- Sam Carolla (1896–1972)
- Carlos Marcello (1910–1993)

=== New York City ===
- Settimo Accardi, "Big Sam" (1902–1997)
- Joe Adonis (1902–1971)
- Evsei Agron (died 1985)
- John Alite (born 1962)
- Vincent Alo, "Jimmy Blue Eyes" (1904–2001)
- Louis Amberg (1897–1935)
- Victor Amuso, "Little Vic" (born 1934)
- Albert Anastasia (1902–1957)
- Anthony Anastasio, "Tough Tony" (1906–1963)
- Marat Balagula (1943-2019)
- Leroy Barnes (1933-2012)
- Thomas Bilotti (1940–1985)
- Joseph Bonanno, "Joe Bananas" (1905–2002)
- Salvatore Bonanno (1932–2008)
- Lepke Buchalter (1897–1944)
- Louis Buchalter (1897–1944)
- James Burke, "Jimmy the Gent" (1931–1996)
- Anthony Casso, "Gaspipe" (1942–2020)
- Louis Campagna, "Little New York" (1900–1955)
- Anthony Carfano, "Little Augie Pisano" (1895–1959)
- Paul Castellano, "Big Paul", called "PC" by his family. (1915–1985)
- Gerardo Catena, "Jerry" (1902–2000)
- Dominick Cirillo, "Quiet Dom" (1929-2024)
- Vincent Coll, "Mad Dog" (1908–1932)
- Joseph Colombo (1923–1978)
- Jimmy Coonan (born 1946)
- Mike Coppola, "Trigger Mike" (1904–1966)
- Anthony Corallo, "Tony Ducks" (1913–2000)
- Nicholas Corozzo (born 1940)
- Frank Costello (1891–1973)
- Steven Crea, "Wonderboy" (born 1947)
- Edward Cummiskey, "Eddie the Butcher" (1934–1976)
- Domenico Cutaia, "Danny" (1936–2018)
- Alphonse D'Arco, "The Professor" (1932–2019)
- Aniello Dellacroce, "Mr. Neil" (1914–1985)
- Roy DeMeo (1942–1983)
- Thomas DeSimone, "Two-Gun Tommy" (1950–1979)
- Tom Devaney (died 1976)
- Jack Diamond, "Legs" (1897–1931)
- Johnny Dio (1914–1979)
- Thomas Eboli, "Tommy Ryan" (1911–1972)
- Carmine Fatico, "Charley Wagons" (1910–1991)
- Mickey Featherstone (born 1948)
- John Franzese, "Sonny" (1917–2020)
- Michael Franzese, "Yuppie Don" (born 1951)
- Christopher Furnari, "Christie Tick" (1924-2018)
- Thomas Gagliano (1884–1951)
- Carmine Galante (1910–1979)
- Joey Gallo, "Crazy Joe" (1929–1972)
- Carlo Gambino (1902–1976)
- Vito Genovese (1897–1969)
- Mario Gigante (1923-2022)
- Vincent Gigante, "Chin" (1928–2005)
- Gene Gotti (born 1946)
- John Gotti (1940–2002)
- John A. Gotti, "Junior" (born 1964)
- Peter Gotti (1939–2021)
- Richard G. Gotti (born 1967)
- Richard V. Gotti (born 1942)
- Sammy Gravano, "The Bull" (born 1945)
- Henry Hill (1943–2012)
- Vyacheslav Ivankov (1940–2009)
- Ronald Jerothe, "Foxy" (1947–1974)
- Gennaro Langella, "Jerry Lang" (1938–2013)
- Meyer Lansky (1902–1983)
- Philip Lombardo, "Benny Squint" (1908–1987)
- Anthony Loria, Sr., "Tony Aboudamita" (died 1989)
- Salvatore Lucania, "Charlie 'Lucky' Luciano" (1897–1962)
- Frank Lucas (1930-2019)
- Thomas Lucchese, "Three Finger Brown" (1899–1967)
- Owney Madden (1891–1965)
- Joseph Magliocco (1898–1963)
- Vincent Mangano (1888–1951)
- Francesco Manzo, "Frankie the Wop" (1925–2012)
- Richard Martino (born 1961)
- Joe Masseria, "Joe the Boss" (1886–1931)
- Joe Massino, "Big Joey" (1943-2023)
- Giuseppe Morello (1867–1930)
- Nicholas Morello (1890–1916)
- Willie Moretti, "Willie" (1894–1951)
- Hughie Mulligan (died 1973)
- Victor Orena, "Little Vic" (born 1934)
- Vincent Papa (1917–1977)
- Carmine Persico (1933-2019)
- Joseph Pinzolo (1887–1930)
- Joe Profaci (1897–1962)
- Bosko Radonjich (1943–2011)
- Philip Rastelli (1918–1991)
- Abraham Reles (1906–1941)
- Arnold Rothstein, "The Big Bankroll" (1882–1928)
- Alex Rudaj (born 1968)
- Anthony Salerno, "Fat Tony" (1911–1992)
- Frank Scalice, "Don Cheech" (1893–1957)
- Gregory Scarpa, "The Grim Reaper" and "The Mad Hatter" (1928–1994)
- Nicolo Schiro, "Cola" (1872–1957)
- Dutch Schultz (1901–1935)
- Bugsy Siegel (1906–1947)
- Mickey Spillane (1934–1977)
- Harry Strauss, "Pittsburgh Phil" (1909–1941)
- Anthony Strollo, "Tony Bender" (1899–1962)
- Vojislav Stanimirović, "Mr Stan" Born (1937-2022)
- Ciro Terranova, "The Artichoke King" (1888–1938)
- Frank Tieri (1904–1981)
- Joe Valachi (1903–1971)
- Paul Vario (1914–1988)
- Frankie Yale (1893–1928)

=== Philadelphia ===
- Angelo Bruno (1910–1980)
- Andrew Thomas DelGiorno (born 1940)
- Jack Diamond (1897–1931)
- Mickey Duffy (1888–1931)
- Waxey Gordon (1888–1952)
- Joseph Ida (1890-1970)
- Phil Leonetti, "Crazy Phil" (born 1953)
- Joseph Ligambi, "Uncle Joe" (born 1939)
- Joseph Massimino
- Joseph Merlino, "Skinny Joey" (born 1962)
- Marco Reginelli, "Small Man" (1897–1956)
- Harry Riccobene (1909–2000)
- Harry Rosen, "Nig" (1902-1953)
- Salvatore Sabella (1891–1962)
- Nicky Scarfo Jr., "Nicky" (born 1964)
- Nicodemo Scarfo, "Little Nicky" (1929–2017)
- Pat Spirito (1939–1983)
- John Stanfa (born 1940)
- Philip Testa, "Chicken Man" (1924–1981)
- Salvatore Testa (1956–1984)

=== Pittsburgh ===
- John Larocca (1956–1984)
- Michael James Genovese (1984–2006)
- John Bazzano Jr (2006–2008)
- Thomas "Sonny" Ciancutti (2008–2021)

=== Providence ===
- Nicholas Bianco (1932–1994)
- Matthew L. Guglielmetti, Jr. (born 1949)
- Luigi Manocchio (1927-2024)
- Raymond L.S. Patriarca (1908–1984)

=== St. Louis ===
- Dinty Colbeck (1890–1943)

=== San Diego ===
- Frank Bompensiero, "Bomp" (1905–1977)

=== San Francisco ===
- James Lanza, "Jimmy the Hat" (1902–2006)

=== San Jose ===
- Onofrio Sciortino (died 1959)

=== Tampa ===
- Ignacio Antinori (1885–1940)
- Santo Trafficante, Sr. (1886–1954)
- Santo Trafficante, Jr. (1914–1987)

=== Wilkes-Barre/Scranton ===
- Rosario "Russell" Bufalino (1903–1994)
- John Sciandra (1899–1940)
- Frank "The Irishman" Sheeran (1920–2003)

== Vietnam ==
=== Hanoi ===
- Dương Văn Khánh (Khánh Trắng ) (1956-1998)
- Nguyễn Thị Hạnh (Hạnh Sự) (born 1956)
- Trần Quốc Sơn (Sơn Bạch Tạng) (born 1962)

=== Haiphong ===
- Ngô Đức Minh (Minh Sứt) (1956-2018)
- Vũ Hoàng Dung (Dung Hà ) (1965-2000)
- Ngô Chí Thành (Thành Chân )
- Phạm Đình Nên (Cu Nên) (1957-1997)

=== Saigon ===
- Lê Văn Viễn (Bảy Viễn ) (1904-1972)
- Lê Văn Đại (Đại Cathay ) (1940-1967)
- Huỳnh Tỳ (1944-?)
- Vũ Đình Khánh (Sơn Đảo) (1944-1975)
- Trương Văn Cam (Năm Cam ) (1947-2004)
- Châu Phát Lai Em (Lai Em) (1959-2004)

== See also ==
- List of American mobsters of Irish descent
- List of British gangsters
- List of godfathers
- List of Italian-American mobsters
- List of Italian Mafia crime families
- List of Jewish-American mobsters
- List of post-Soviet mobsters
- List of Sicilian mafiosi
- Mafia
