= Dominick Basso =

American mobster (1938–2001)

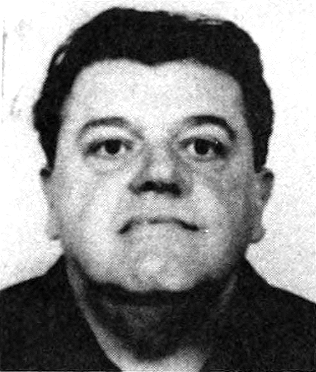
- Born: Dominick J. Basso; February 15, 1938; Chicago, Illinois, U.S.
- Died: March 25, 2001 (aged 63); Mount Prospect, Illinois, U.S.
- Allegiance: Chicago Outfit
- Convictions: Syndicate gambling, conspiracy (1988)
- Penalty: 20 months' probation and 70 days' work release

Dominick J. Basso (February 15, 1938 – March 25, 2001), sometimes shown incorrectly as Dominic Basso, was an American mobster in the Chicago Outfit and a high-ranking bookmaker who was convicted in 1988 for syndicated gambling. Basso most notably was linked to baseball star Pete Rose in a scandal as having been a bookie through whom Rose had placed bets on major-league baseball.

== Early life ==
Basso served in the United States Navy.

== Career in Chicago Outfit ==
Basso was arrested in January 1988 after being suspected of being an overseer of the Chicago Outfit's betting operations in DuPage County, Illinois and Chicago's northwest suburbs. In December 1988, Basso was convicted in Chicago of syndicate gambling and conspiracy to commit gambling and later was sentenced to 20 months of probation and 70 days of work release. At the time of Basso's arrest, betting slips showed that his clients often wagered large sums on baseball, football, basketball, and horse racing events. Authorities had seized $225,000 in betting slips, Basso's 1988 Lincoln Town Car, his cell telephone and $8,700 in cash, according to a news account.

Basso had been reported by the Chicago Sun-Times to have operated a cleaning store to conceal his real occupation as the head of crime syndicate bosses who had controlled the Midwest's sports betting.

In January 1991, the Chicago Crime Commission publicly identified Basso in a report titled Organized Crime in Chicago 1990. Basso was identified in 1989 as having worked for mob chieftains Ernest Rocco Infelise, Donald Angelini, Dominic Cortina and Salvatore DeLaurentis.

== Pete Rose gambling scandal ==
In 1989, baseball manager and retired baseball star Pete Rose was accused of having placed bets on major-league baseball games. Investigator John M. Dowd discovered six telephone calls that Rose had made to Basso's home and his bookmaking wire room over a period of several years in the late 1980s. Dowd's aides told the Internal Revenue Service that Rose had placed bets with Basso believed to be more than $2,000 each on a variety of sporting events. The Chicago Sun-Times reported at the time that Rose had made calls listed to telephones in various locations where Basso operated sports betting operations.

Rose famously denied knowing Basso at his farewell news conference on August 25, 1989, after he agreed to permanent ineligibility from baseball because of allegations that he had gambled on baseball games while playing for and managing the Cincinnati Reds (in 2004, after years of public denial, Rose admitted to betting on baseball and on, but not against, the Reds). "I don't know no Mr. Basso," Rose told reporters in August 1989. "Sounds like he should be from Chicago, though."

== Personal ==
Basso lived in Hawthorn Woods, Illinois from at least the 1980s until 1999.

Upon his death, Basso was survived by his wife, Diane; three sons, Michael, Vincent and Dominick Jr.; and a daughter, Christine Marzillo.

Basso's son, Vincent Basso, was sentenced in 1999 to 1½ years in prison and fined $27,000 by United States District Judge Robert C. Broomfield for his role in a point-shaving scandal involving Arizona State University basketball. Vincent Basso reaped $27,000 from betting on a basketball game between Arizona State and the University of Southern California.

== Death ==
Basso died in Mount Prospect, Illinois on March 25, 2001.
