= Frank Tieri =

Frank Tieri may refer to:

- Frank Tieri (writer) (born 1970), American comic book writer
- Frank Tieri (mobster) (1904–1981), New York mobster
