= Tieri (surname) =

Tieri is a surname. Notable people with the surname include:

- Aroldo Tieri (1917–2006), Italian actor
- Frank Tieri (born 1970), American comic book writer
- Frank Tieri (1904–1981), New York mobster
