= Carmelo Bruzzese =

Italian-Canadian mobster

- Born: July 13, 1949 (age 76); Grotteria, Calabria, Italy
- Occupation: Mobster

Carmelo Bruzzese (Italian pronunciation: [karˈmɛːlo brutˈtseːze; -eːse]; born 13 July 1949) is an Italian-Canadian mobster from Grotteria, Calabria, who was connected to the 'Ndrangheta and the Siderno Group branch based in Woodbridge, Ontario.

== Early life and family ==
Bruzzese was born in 1949, in Grotteria, Calabria, Italy. He immigrated to Canada on 3 May 1974, and later became a permanent resident in Canada. In 1977, he returned to Italy, travelling between countries several times. He returned to Canada on 12 December 2009, to Woodbridge, Ontario, where he settled with his wife, Carla Calabro, who is a Canadian citizen. He has five children; his daughter Melina, a Canadian citizen, married Italian mobster Antonio Coluccio, who was sentenced to 30 years in prison in 2018 for corruption, and his son Carlo, a Canadian citizen, serving a six-year sentence for the Italian crime of mafia association.

== Wanted in Italy for mafia association and deportation ==
In 2008, Bruzzese was charged, and faced a trial in Italy, on the allegation that he was associated with the Rizzuto crime family of Montreal; he was later acquitted of this charge. In September 2010, an arrest warrant was issued by the Italian authorities pursuant to article 416-bis of the Italian Criminal Code, which deals with mafia association, and later registered on 30 April 2018, with Interpol as a red notice. However, he was not extradited because there is no charge in Canada for association with a mafia-like organization under the IRPA.

On 21 August 2013, a section 44 IRPA report was written alleging that Bruzzese is inadmissible to Canada under paragraph 37(1)(a) of the IRPA for membership in the 'Ndrangheta criminal organization. On 22 August 2013, a warrant was issued for his arrest, and the next day, Bruzzese was arrested and detained by the immigration authorities at his Woodbridge home on the allegation of being unlikely to appear and of being a danger to the public. He was detained at Maplehurst Correctional Complex.

At his May 2014 Immigration and Refugee Board of Canada (IRB) hearing, there was a heightened security presence after Carmine Verduci, a 'Ndrangheta member and close associate of Bruzzese's, was gunned down two weeks prior. At another IRB hearing, Bruzzese had admitted under oath that he had his children physically bring large sums of cash from Italy on a regular basis instead of using bank wire, transfers or electronic transfers; he also acknowledged during his testimony that he drove a BMW registered in another person's name whose last name he did not know; he claimed medications prescribed to another person as his own; and he also bought a $600,000 home in Canada with one of his sons despite stating in the hearing that he did not earn enough money in Canada to file a tax return.

In August 2015, the IRB issued a deportation order for Bruzzese. Bruzzese appealed the decision to the Federal Court of Canada, but it was rejected, and on 2 October 2015, Bruzzese was escorted onto a plane in Toronto, landing in Rome, where he was arrested by Italian police. Major Giuseppe De Felice, a commander with the Carabinieri, told the IRB that Bruzzese "assumed the most important roles and decisions. He gave the orders." As of 2017, he awaits trial in Italy for a possible 10-year sentence for mafia association.
