= San Vitaliano =

- Comune
- Comune di San Vitaliano
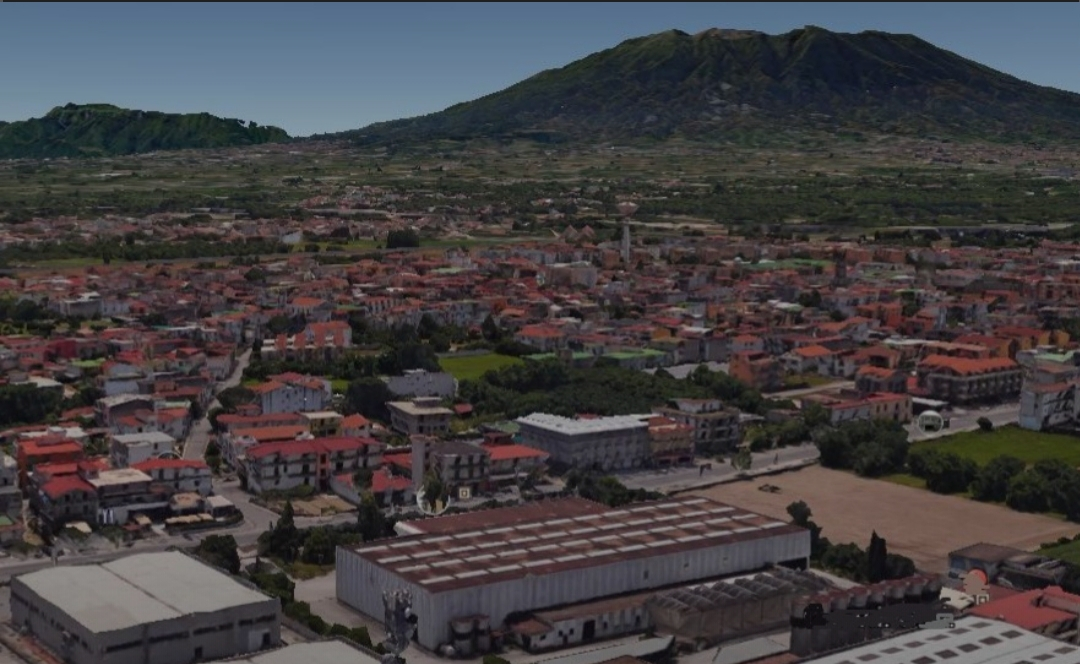
- San Vitaliano

- Location within Italy Location within Campania
- Coordinates: 40°56′N 14°29′E
- Country: Italy
- Region: Campania
- Metropolitan city: Naples (NA)

Government
  - Mayor: Pasquale Raimo

Area
  - Total: 5.5 km^{2} (2.1 sq mi)
- Elevation: 30 m (98 ft)

Population (28 February 2017)
  - Total: 6,398
  - Density: 1,200/km^{2} (3,000/sq mi)
- Demonym: Sanvitalianesi
- Time zone: UTC+1 (CET)
  - Summer (DST): UTC+2 (CEST)
- Postal code: 80030
- Dialing code: 0810
- Website: Official website

San Vitaliano (Italian pronunciation: [saɱ vitaˈljaːno]) is a comune (municipality) in the Metropolitan City of Naples in the Italian region Campania, located about 25 km (16 mi) northeast of Naples.

San Vitaliano borders the following municipalities: Marigliano, Nola, Saviano, Scisciano.
