= Saviano =

- Comune
- Comune di Saviano
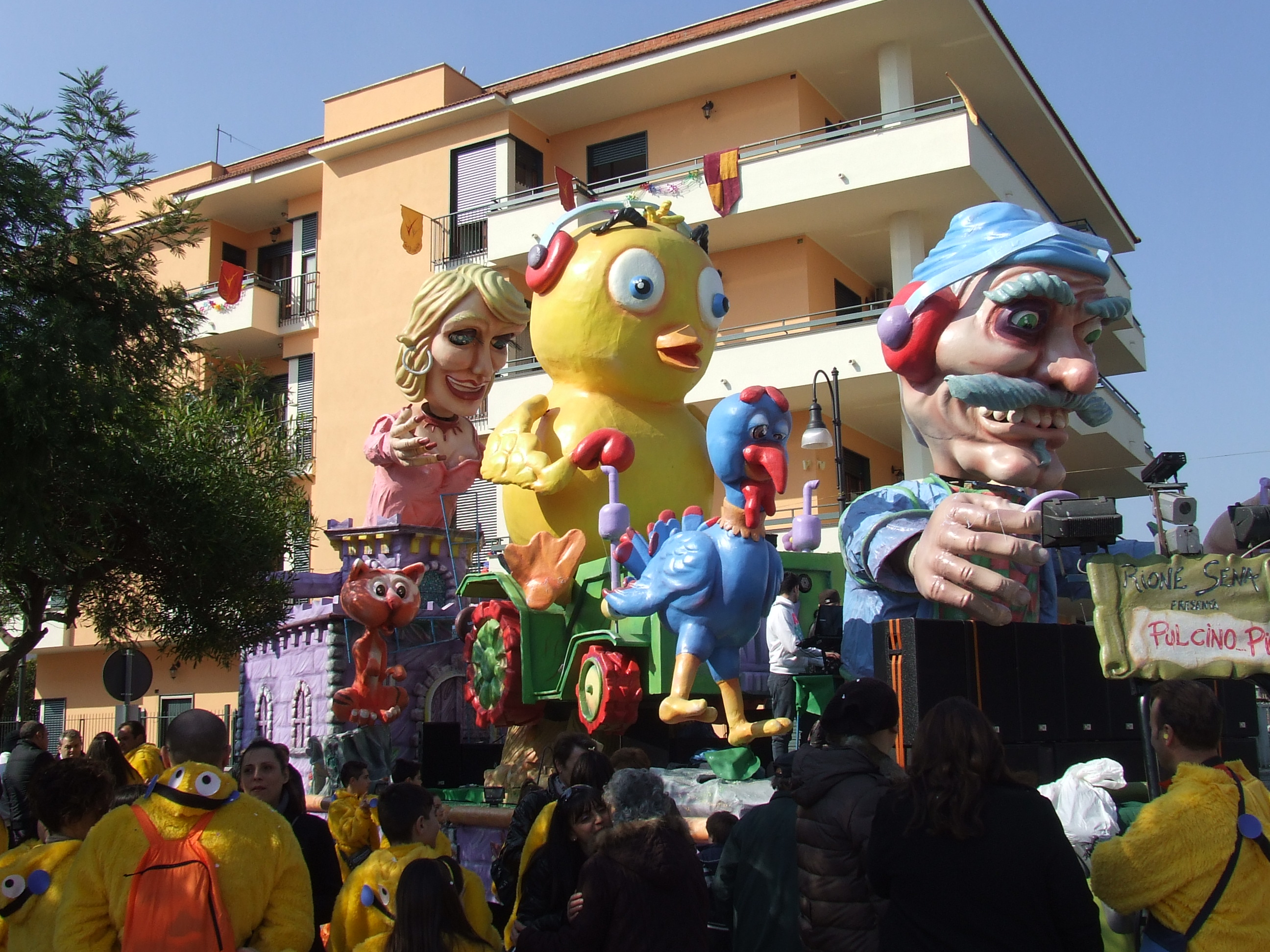

- Flag Coat of arms

- Location within Italy Location within Campania
- Coordinates: 40°55′N 14°31′E
- Country: Italy
- Region: Campania
- Metropolitan city: Naples (NA)
- Frazioni: Cerreto - Aliperti, Capocaccia, Fressuriello, Sant'Erasmo, Tommasoni

Government
  - Mayor: Carmine Sommese

Area
  - Total: 13.8 km^{2} (5.3 sq mi)

Population (Dec. 2004)
  - Total: 15,114
  - Density: 1,100/km^{2} (2,840/sq mi)
- Demonym: Savianesi
- Time zone: UTC+1 (CET)
  - Summer (DST): UTC+2 (CEST)
- Postal code: 80039
- Dialing code: 081

Saviano is a comune (municipality) in the Metropolitan City of Naples in the Italian region Campania, located about 25 km (16 mi) northeast of Naples. As of 31 December 2004, it had a population of 15,114 and an area of 13.8 km^{2} (5.3 sq mi).

== Geography ==
Saviano borders the following municipalities: Nola, San Vitaliano, Scisciano, Somma Vesuviana.

== History ==
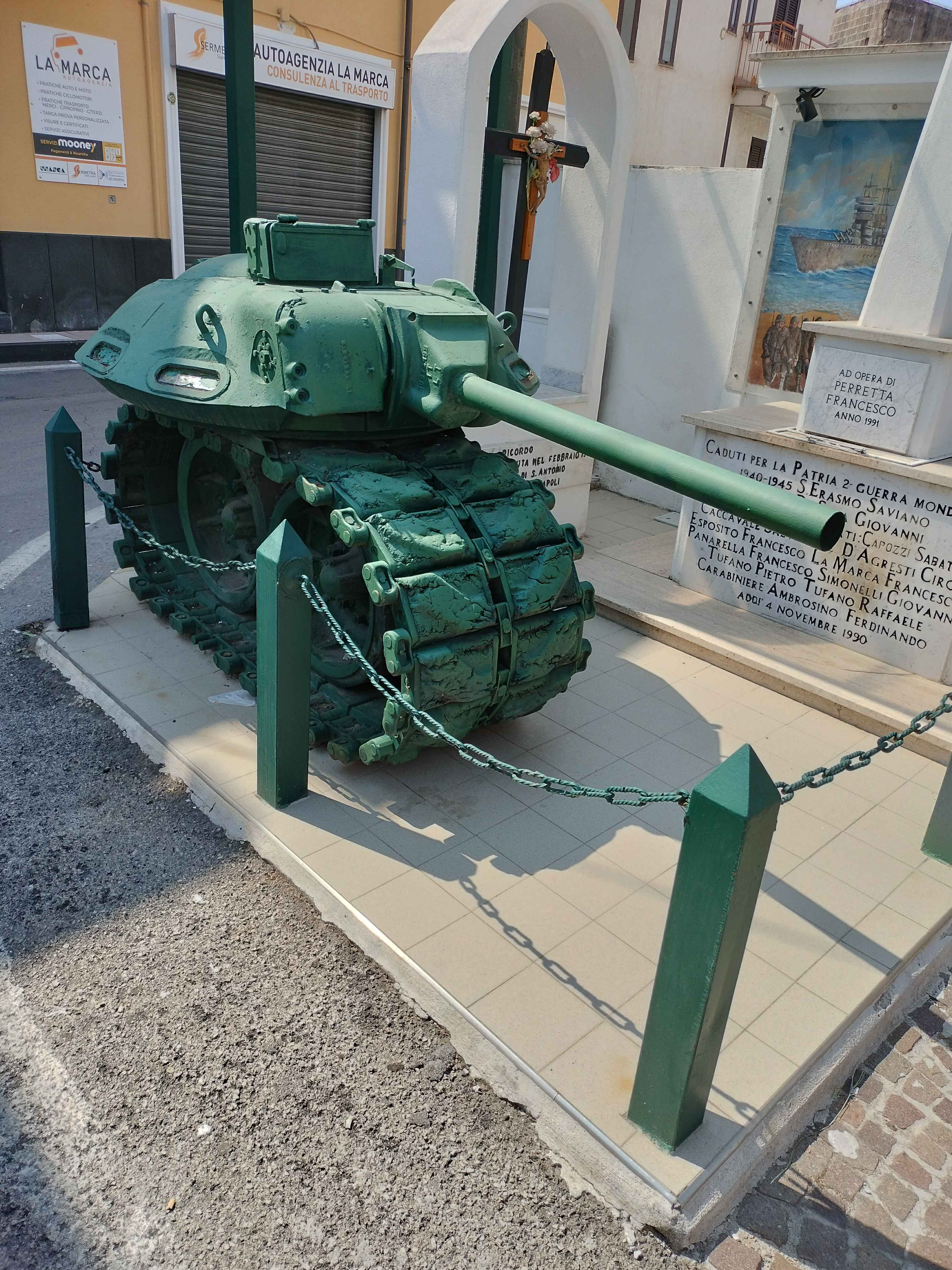
The Tonk, a World War II memorial in Saviano

The comune was created in 1867 through the merger of the former Sirico (thenceforth called Saviano) with Sant'Erasmo. It was part of the Terra di Lavoro province until 1927.

A World War II memorial, humorously called the Tonk, is located in Saviano.

== Demographic evolution ==
Historical population

Year	Pop.	±%
1861	6,444	—
1871	6,598	+2.4%
1881	6,952	+5.4%
1901	6,381	−8.2%
1911	6,353	−0.4%

Year	Pop.	±%
1921	6,648	+4.6%
1931	7,059	+6.2%
1936	7,614	+7.9%
1951	9,445	+24.0%
1961	10,259	+8.6%

Year	Pop.	±%
1971	10,552	+2.9%
1981	11,056	+4.8%
1991	13,101	+18.5%
2001	14,755	+12.6%

Source: Data from ISTAT
