= Siderno Group =

Multinational criminal organization

The Siderno Group is a criminal association in Canada, Australia and Italy related to the 'Ndrangheta, a Mafia-type organization in Calabria. The association is labelled the "Siderno Group" because its members primarily came from the town of Siderno on the Ionian coast in Calabria and migrated to Canada and Australia in the 1950s.

The Siderno crime group operates throughout Canada, the United States, Australia and Europe and is composed of a group of families who are related by blood or marriage. Siderno is home to one of the 'Ndrangheta's biggest and most important clans, the Commisso 'ndrina, involved in the global cocaine business and money laundering.

The group has moved narcotics over three continents. They had contacts in Bolivia, Venezuela, Brazil, Chile and Peru, and had permanent representation in Colombia for drugs and in Costa Rica and Panama for money laundering. Its key man in Colombia, Roberto Pannunzi, was arrested in Medellín, Colombia in 1994. In the past, he had been in charge of heroin shipments from Turkey through Italy to the United States.

== Canada ==
In Canada, in particular in the Greater Toronto Area, a branch of the Siderno Group has been active since the 1950s. Until 1980, the head of the Group was Michele (Mike) Racco. He maintained close contacts with the Luppino crime family in Hamilton, Ontario and with the Cotroni crime family in Montreal. By 1962, Racco established a crimini and Camera di Controllo in Canada with the help of Giacomo Luppino and Rocco Zito. Salvatore Triumbari and Filippo Vendemini were also co-founders until Racco sanctioned their murders in 1967 and 1969 respectively, due to disputes. Racco had been urged to start the Canadian operation by Antonio Macrì, the undisputed boss of Siderno until he was killed in January 1975. Michele Racco died of cancer in January 1980.

A May 2018 news report explained the group's initial involvement in Canada. "Siderno's Old World 'Ndrangheta boss sent acolytes to populate the New World" including Michele Racco who settled in Toronto in 1952, followed by other mob families. According to investigators in Italy, by 2010, Toronto's 'Ndrangheta had climbed "to the top of the criminal world" with "an unbreakable umbilical cord" to Calabria. The report stated that there were seven senior 'Ndrangheta bosses in the Greater Toronto Area, some on the Camera di Controllo, the "board of directors".

The Toronto-area Siderno group has included the Coluccio, Tavernese, DeMaria, Figliomeni, Ruso, and Commisso crime families; Leaders are based both in Calabria and Ontario. Carmine Verduci and Cosimo Stalteri were also linked with the 'Ndrangheta group.

By 1976, Cosimo Commisso was considered by the police to be a capo bastone (underboss) in the Siderno group. By the early 1980s, Zito was boss of the Toronto Siderno Group after the death of Michele Racco. Racco's son Domenic Racco also filled his void briefly. In January 1983, Anthony Musitano of the Hamilton-based Musitano crime family was sentenced to 15 years in prison for bombing a number of businesses in Hamilton, including bakeries. While in prison, he orchestrated the murder of Domenic Racco, who violated their cocaine trade agreement by dealing behind Musitano's back, and also owed the Musitano family as much as $500,000. Racco was also arrested in February 1982 and charged in connection with a cocaine-trafficking conspiracy and was awaiting trial. Tony Musitano befriended inmate Billy Rankin at Millhaven Institution in Kingston who was due to be released in December that year. Giuseppe Avignone, nephew of Tony and Domenic Musitano, often visited Tony in prison to discuss details of the plot, which were secretly recorded by the police. Rankin was released on December 7, and given "the okay" by Domenic Musitano. On December 10, 1983, Racco got into a car in front of his Mississauga apartment with Rankin, Domenic Musitano and Peter Majeste, thinking it was to discuss a potential drug trade, but was taken to a railway track and killed. In March 1984, Domenic and Tony Musitano, Avignone and Rankin were arrested. Domenic Musitano received six years for being an accessory after the fact to murder. Anthony Musitano, already in prison on the bombing charges, was sentenced to 12 years concurrently, Avignone got five years and Rankin was sentenced to 12 years, all three pleading guilty to conspiracy to commit murder.

The Siderno mob in Southern Ontario was at the centre of a criminal business such as drug trafficking, cigarette smuggling, extortion, and gambling. The organisation managed to gain high levels of income from these activities in Canada, but the affiliated persons used to maintain tight links with the small and poor town of Siderno. In fact the organisation of the group was controlled from Siderno or in accordance with clans based there.

Giuseppe Coluccio, a member of the Coluccio clan, was arrested on August 7, 2008, outside a strip mall in Markham, Ontario, north of Toronto. He had been hiding in Canada for nearly three years under a false identity and was wanted for drug related offences, charges of Mafia association and extortion. He was extradited from Canada to Italy on August 19, 2008, and incarcerated under the strict Article 41-bis prison regime. Also from the Greater Toronto Area, Giuseppe's brother Antonio Coluccio (who had used the alias Giuseppe Scarfo in Canada) was one of 29 people named in arrest warrants in Italy in September 2014. Police said they were part of the Commisso 'ndrina ('Ndrangheta) crime family in Siderno. In July 2018, Coluccio was sentenced to 30 years in prison for corruption. His two brothers, Giuseppe and Salvatore, were already in prison in Italy on Mafia-related convictions. His father-in-law, Carmelo Bruzzese was deported to Italy from Canada in 2015.

Cosimo Stalteri, considered to be a boss of one of 10 'Ndrangheta clans in Ontario, based in Toronto, Hamilton, Ottawa and London, and on the Camera di Controllo, died in 2011 of natural causes in Toronto at the age of 86. Rocco Remo Commisso, nephew of Michele Racco, and brother of Cosimo Commisso, has also been named as high-ranking in Canadian police reports.

In June 2018, Cosimo Ernesto Commisso ("Coco"), of Woodbridge, Ontario and an unrelated woman were shot and killed. According to sources contacted by the Toronto Star, "Commisso was related to Cosimo Commissio of Siderno, Italy, who has had relations in Ontario, is considered by police to be a "'Ndrangheta organized crime boss". The National Post reported that Cosimo Ernesto Commisso, while not a known criminal, "shares a name and family ties with a man who has for decades been reputed to be a Mafia leader in the Toronto area". The cousin of Cosimo, Antonio Commisso, was on the list of most wanted fugitives in Italy until his capture on June 28, 2005, in Woodbridge.

By mid-2019, Police in Italy and in Canada were convinced that "the ’Ndrangheta’s Canadian presence has become so powerful and influential that the board north of Toronto has the authority to make decisions, not only in relation to Canada’s underworld, but also abroad, even back in Siderno".

On July 18, 2019, the York Regional Police announced the largest organized crime bust in Ontario, part of an 18-month long operation called Project Sindicato that was also coordinated with the Italian State Police. York Regional Police had arrested 15 people in Canada and seized $35 million worth of homes, sports cars and cash in a major trans-Atlantic probe targeting the most prominent wing of the 'Ndrangheta in Canada, allegedly headed by Angelo Figliomeni. On July 14 and 15, approximately 500 officers raided 48 homes and businesses across the GTA, seizing 27 homes worth $24 million, 23 cars, including five Ferraris, and $2 million in cash and jewelry. Nine of the 15 arrests in Canada included major crime figures: Angelo Figliomeni, Vito Sili, Nick Martino, Emilio Zannuti, Erica Quintal, Salvatore Oliveti, Giuseppe Ciurleo, Rafael Lepore and Francesco Vitucci. The charges laid included tax evasion, money laundering, defrauding the government and participating in a criminal organization.

Also in mid-July, the related investigation in Italy led to the arrest of 12 people in the Siderno Group in Calabria. The 12 are "closely associated to the Canadian branch of the operation,” according to Fausto Lamparelli of the Italian State Police. On 9 August 2019, as part of the same joint investigation, several former Greater Toronto Area residents were arrested in Calabria, including Giuseppe (Joe) DeMaria, Francesco Commisso, Rocco Remo Commisso, Antonio Figliomeni and Cosimo Figiomeni.

Cousins of DeMaria, Giuseppe Gregaraci and his cousin Vincenzo Muià had visited Toronto on March 31, 2019, to meet with Angelo and Cosimo Figliomeni, seeking answers to who had ambushed and killed Muià's brother, Carmelo "Mino" Muià, in Siderno on January 18, 2018; Muià's smartphone was unwittingly and secretly transmitting his closed-door conversations to authorities in Italy. According to Italian police reports, the two men were picked up from Pearson International Airport by Luigi Vescio, a funeral home director in the Greater Toronto Area, where they were taken to Angel's Bakery, a family business of DeMaria's. They were also taken to meet with Joe DeMaria. Joe DeMaria and Vescio then drove to Kingston to visit his brother Vincenzo DeMaria in prison. When Muià and Gregaraci returned to Italy, they were arrested, and in January 2020, Gregaraci committed suicide in his prison cell. Muià was later sentenced in Italy to 16 years and 8 months in prison for his role in the "Canadian Connection", in March 2021.

In 2020, the charges laid against three individuals as a result of Project Sindicato were "stayed" (the prosecution discontinued), unless the prosecutors could find new evidence and proceeded with the charges again within one year. In January 2021, the charges against the remaining six were also stayed, including that of Angelo Figliomeni, "the head of the 'Ndrangheta in Toronto" according to York Regional Police. The charges were stayed after an investigation "into the use of the privileged conversations" that found "improper use of wiretapping" and "significant breaches of solicitor-client privilege". All property seized by police must now be returned — with the exception of illegal possessions.

== Australia ==
The Australian version of the Siderno Group was involved in drug and arms trafficking as well as money laundering. In the Australian case too, businesses were carried out in very tight relation with the Siderno families or families coming from the surroundings of the town.
