= Raffaele Delle Donne =

Raffaele Delle Donne (Italian: [raffaˈɛːle delle ˈdɔnne]; born 1967/68) is an Italian-Canadian Mafia associate based in Toronto and Woodbridge, Ontario, Canada, who later voluntarily turned police informant. After a botched hit on a rival mobster at a North York California Sandwiches shop that left an innocent bystander paralyzed, Delle Donne worked with police for 13 months wearing wiretaps. This led to the 2005 arrests of his associate Pietro Scarcella, Mark Peretz, Paris Christoforou and Antonio Borrelli, and the 2006 convictions that resulted in nine-year prison sentences for Scarcella, Peretz and Christoforou, while the shooter Borrelli received 10 years in prison.

== Early life ==
Delle Donne was born in Naples, Italy, where he sold fake Gucci belts to make money. In 1980, a massive earthquake killed more than 2,500 people and destroyed 30,000 homes, including the seventh-floor apartment where he lived with his parents and four siblings. In the winter of 1981, the family immigrated from Italy to Toronto. In grade 8, after his parents separated, Delle Donne quit school to work in a glass factory and made $10,000 every couple of weeks selling fake Armani suits out of his car. He later married and had two sons, giving up his scamming lifestyle to please his wife; he got a job at the post office in the Corso Italia area of Toronto.

== Attempted hit on Modica ==
In 2002, he became active in the mob with mobster Michael Marrese, allies with Michele Modica, who had a reputation as the "king of mortgage frauds". Marrese used Delle Donne as a chauffeur, errand boy and scout for potential properties. Delle Donne was later approached by rival mobster Pietro Scarcella to spy on Marrese and Modica. Hostilities developed between Scarcella and Modica, who owed $130,000 to him and the Hells Angels. Another mobster, Salvatore Calautti ran up over $200,000 in gambling debts to the Rizzuto crime family and the Hells Angels; refusing to pay, the debt was believed to be assumed by Modica. This led to the April 21, 2004, attempted assassination of Modica in a North York California Sandwiches shop, leaving an innocent victim, mother of three children, Louise Russo paralyzed while Modica and his associates escaped unscathed. Scarcella's nephew Antonio Borrelli had sprayed bullets with an AR-15 rifle from a van including Hells Angels bikers Paris Christoforou and Mark Peretz as the driver. Delle Donne, who had arranged the meeting to unsuspectingly double cross Modica under Scarcella's orders, was also in the shop at the time of the attempted hit. Modica was later deported to Sicily.

== Pentito ==
Delle Donne soon turned pentito (informant) voluntarily to help put those involved in injuring an innocent bystander in jail. Delle Donne worked with police for 13 months wearing wiretaps, and on April 14, 2005, Scarcella, Peretz, Christoforou and Borrelli, were arrested. In April 2006, in a plea bargain, Scarcella was convicted of conspiracy to commit murder, and sentenced to nine years in prison along with Peretz and Christoforou, while the shooter Borrelli received 10 years in prison. During the 2006 sentencing, Russo was paid $2 million in restitution from the mobsters to cover costs of rehabilitation and increased living expenses. Police offered Delle Donne up to $500,000 for his work, but he refused, as well as the refusal to enter Canada's federal witness protection program. After the shooting, his wife left with their sons in the witness protection program. Delle Donne, who lives in an unknown location, is considered a "rat" by the mob and has a $100,000 contract on his head.
