= Thomas Eboli =

Italian-American mobster (1911–1972)

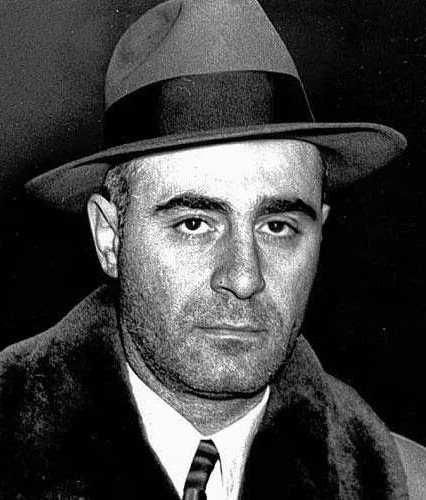
- Eboli in the 1940s
- Born: Tommaso Eboli; June 13, 1911; Scisciano, Campania, Italy
- Died: July 16, 1972 (aged 61); Crown Heights, Brooklyn New York
- Cause of death: Gunshot wounds
- Resting place: George Washington Memorial Park, Paramus, New Jersey
- Other names: "Tommy", "Tommy Ryan"
- Occupation: Crime boss
- Spouse: Mary Perello
- Children: 7
- Allegiance: Genovese crime family
- Conviction: Assault (1952)
- Penalty: 60 days' imprisonment

Thomas "Tommy Ryan" Eboli (born Tommaso Eboli, Italian: [tomˈmaːzo ˈɛboli]; June 13, 1911 Scisciano, Italy – July 16, 1972 Crown Heights, Brooklyn, New York) was a New York City mobster who eventually became the acting boss of the Genovese crime family.

== Early life ==
Eboli was born as Tommaso Eboli in Scisciano, in the Province of Naples, Italy, to Louis Eboli and Madalena Maddalone. Eboli was the brother of Genovese crime family capo Pasquale "Patty Ryan" Eboli. To hide his Italian heritage, Eboli adapted the nickname "Tommy Ryan" from professional boxer Tommy Ryan. Eboli became a U.S. citizen on August 27, 1960.

Eboli was married to Anna Ariola from Melrose Park, Illinois. Their children were Thomas Eboli Jr. and Chicago Outfit mobster Louis "The Mooch" Eboli. "The Mooch" died in 1987 from cancer at the age of 52.

After separating from Ariola, Eboli entered a relationship with Mary Perello. They had two daughters, Madelena and Mary, and a son Saverio. Eboli also had 2 daughters Roseann and JoAnne from when he was together with Helen Neggie of Jackson Heights. Eboli and his third family lived in a high rise apartment building in Fort Lee, New Jersey that overlooked the Hudson River. However, just before his death, Eboli had purchased a home in Fair Lawn, New Jersey.

As a young man, Eboli worked as a professional boxer. In the early 1920s, during Prohibition, Eboli became a bootlegger for future crime boss Lucky Luciano. By the early 1930s, Eboli had become the personal bodyguard for Luciano's underboss, Vito "Don Vito" Genovese. Some sources claim that Eboli committed as many as 20 murders for the Genovese family.

In 1933, Eboli was arrested on six counts of illegal gambling and disorderly conduct.

== Boxing manager ==
At some point during the 1930s or 1940s, Eboli became a boxing manager. One of his early boxing protegees was future Genovese family boss Vincent Gigante.

On January 11, 1952, Eboli assaulted two officials during a professional boxing match at Manhattan's Madison Square Garden Arena. On that evening, Eboli was managing middleweight boxer Rocky Castellani, who was fighting Ernie (The Rock) Durando. After Durando knocked down Castellani in the 6th and 7th rounds, referee Ray Miller stopped the fight and awarded a technical knockout victory to Durando. At that point, an enraged Eboli entered the boxing ring and punched Miller. Later in Castellani's dressing room, Eboli kicked Al Weill, the boxing promoter. Sport writers later speculated that Eboli had expected his fighter to win due to an illegal arrangement with Weill.

On January 23, 1952, Eboli was indicted on two counts of assault from the boxing incident. On May 26, 1952, Eboli pleaded guilty to reduced charges and was later sentenced to 60 days in prison, his only incarceration during a life of crime. The New York State Athletic Commission also banned Eboli from boxing for life.

== Acting boss ==
In 1957, Genovese finally became boss, and Eboli became the Caporegime over the old Greenwich Village Crew. Eboli was said to own several tourist nightclubs and gay bars in Midtown Manhattan and Lower Manhattan. Eboli also controlled rackets on the Hudson River docks in Manhattan. Eboli was also the owner of Jet Music Corporation, a jukebox supplier. and Tryan Cigarette Vending Service, Inc.

On April 17, 1959, Genovese was sentenced to 15 years in federal prison, leaving Eboli as acting boss of the family. Gerardo "Jerry" Catena became underboss and Michele "Big Mike" Miranda became consigliere. Anthony "Tony Bender" Strollo became Eboli's top aide. Some authors claim that for the next ten years, family decisions were made collectively by a "Committee/Ruling Panel" that included Eboli, Catena, and capo Philip Lombardo. Other authors state that Miranda, not Lombardo, was the third member of this panel.

In September 1966 he was arrested along with twelve others after attending the La Stella Restaurant meeting. All thirteen men were arrested and charged with "consorting with known criminals", each had bail set at $100,000. The sum total of their bail, $1,300,000, was paid the next day by a bail bondsman with no collateral. They were subsequently released.

On February 14, 1969, Genovese died of natural causes in prison, leaving the Genovese family hierarchy in turmoil. Eboli was a logical successor, but his health had deteriorated that year plus he was under investigation. On July 28, 1969, Eboli suffered his third heart attack of that year. He was rushed to New York University Medical Center in Manhattan, where he eventually recovered. His previous heart attack occurred on July 17, two days after appearing before the New Jersey State Investigation Committee in hearings on organized crime. Eboli first suffered an attack in February 1969 at a New York State Investigation Commission meeting. However, both law enforcement and other mobsters believed that Eboli had faked some of these attacks.

After Genovese's death, Catena became the new official boss. However, Catena was indicted and jailed in 1970. With Catena gone, Eboli now became the official boss of the Genovese family. However, Lombardo and Miranda were really in charge and Eboli was just a front for law enforcement.

== Eboli's downfall ==
Eboli continued as the "front boss" of the family for the next two years. However, Eboli wanted to be the real head of the Genovese family. To further his advancement, Eboli borrowed $4 million from the Commission chairman and head of the rival Gambino crime family, Carlo Gambino, to fund a new drug trafficking operation. However, law enforcement soon shut down Eboli's drug racket and arrested most of his crew. Gambino and his underboss, Aniello Dellacroce, allegedly came to Eboli to get their money back, but he did not have it. Gambino then allegedly ordered Eboli's murder due to lack of payment. However, it is believed that Gambino actually wanted to replace Eboli with Gambino ally Frank "Funzi" Tieri, and that Gambino used the drug trafficking operation to set up Eboli.

On July 16, 1972, Eboli left his girlfriend's apartment in Crown Heights, Brooklyn around 1:00 a.m. and walked to his chauffeured Cadillac car. As Eboli sat in the parked car, a gunman in a passing truck shot him five times. Hit in the head and neck, Eboli died instantly. No one was ever charged with his murder.

Eboli was buried at George Washington Memorial Park in Paramus, New Jersey. Aside from the Eboli family, the only attendees at the graveside funeral were law enforcement.

== See also ==
- List of unsolved murders (1900–1979)

American Mafia
Preceded by Vito Genovese	Genovese crime family Acting boss 1959-1969	Succeeded by Philip Lombardo as boss (effective)
Preceded by Vito Genovese	Genovese crime family Front boss 1969-1972	Succeeded by Frank Tieri
