= Anfield (suburb) =

Coordinates: 53°25′58″N 2°57′16″W

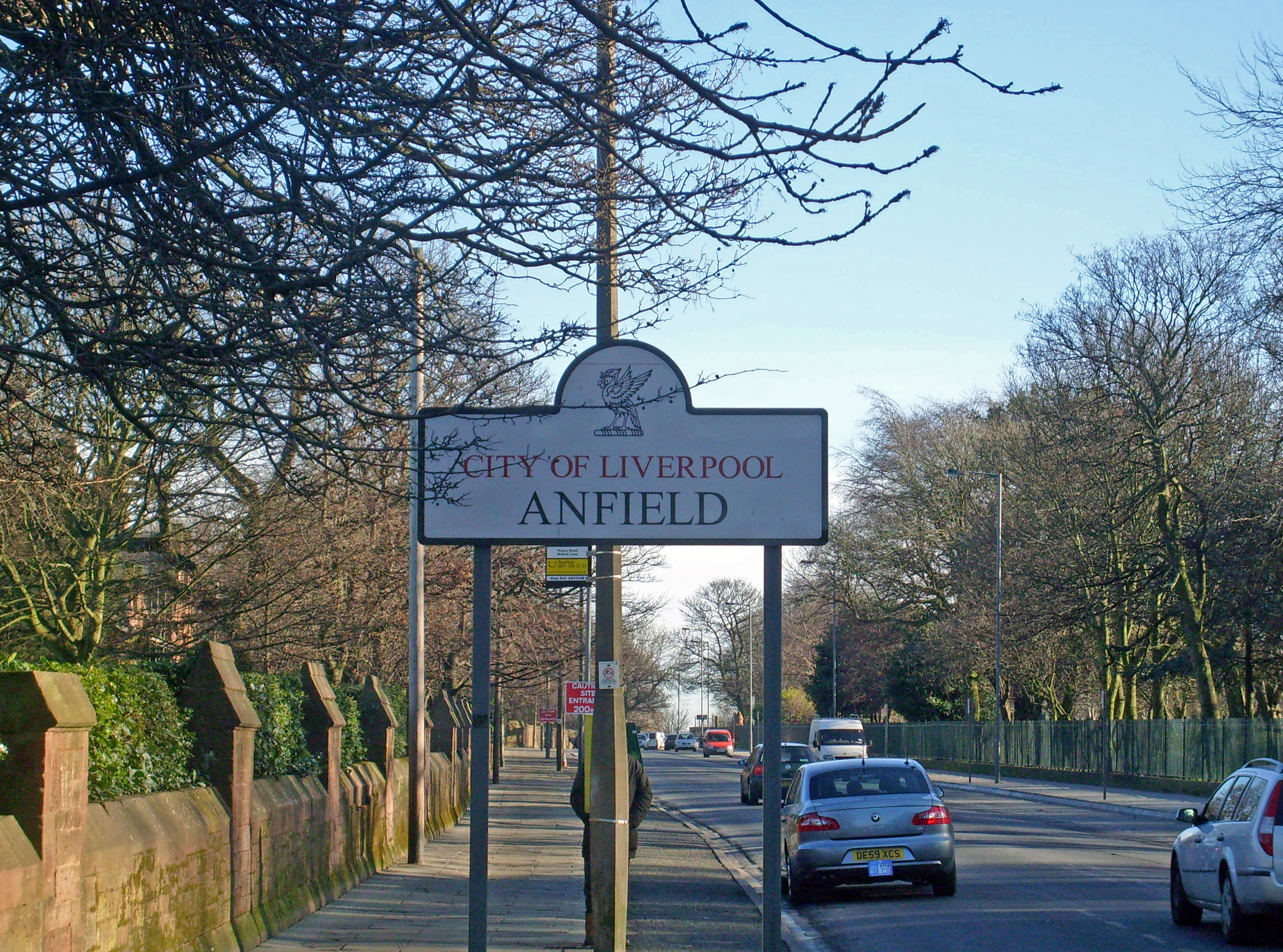
- Anfield district sign

- Location within Merseyside
- Population: 14,510 (2011)
- OS grid reference: SJ367933
- Metropolitan borough: City of Liverpool
- Metropolitan county: Merseyside
- Region: North West
- Country: England
- Sovereign state: United Kingdom
- Post town: LIVERPOOL
- Postcode district: L4, L5, L6
- Dialling code: 0151
- Police: Merseyside
- Fire: Merseyside
- Ambulance: North West
- UK Parliament: Liverpool Walton

Anfield is a suburb of Liverpool, England, in the Liverpool City Council ward of Anfield. Historically in Lancashire, it is part of the Liverpool Walton Parliamentary constituency. The population of the Liverpool Ward at the time of the 2011 census was 14,510. The area has been home to the football club Liverpool F.C. ever since the club's founding in 1892. The club's home stadium, Anfield, has been located there since its founding in 1884. As of September 2019, it was ranked the tenth-most deprived ward in the United Kingdom.

== Development ==
In 1836, Walton lost its independence and was made part of Liverpool Borough Council. The Ordnance Survey map from 1851 shows a house here called Anfield House (then described as Annfield House), around which the suburb developed.

From 1863, the City Council developed the 120 acres (49 ha) Priory Road Cemetery, to which later was added a crematorium.

== Transport ==
Anfield has no passenger rail service, despite the Canada Dock Branch line running through it. The area used to be served by Breck Road railway station and Walton & Anfield railway station until their closure in 1948. It was announced in December 2019 that Liverpool City Council had commissioned a feasibility study to see about reopening the Canada Dock Branch to passenger traffic.

== Notable buildings ==
Anfield is home to Liverpool F.C.'s Anfield Stadium.

Dan Carden MP's office is located on Priory Road.

== Notable residents ==
The Whitney gang lived in Anfield. Comedian Alexei Sayle, actress Alison Steadman, and writer Chris Shepherd all grew up in Anfield.

== See also ==
- Anfield Cemetery
