= Vincenzo DeMaria =

Italian-Canadian mob boss and business man

Vincenzo "Jimmy" DeMaria (Italian: [vinˈtʃɛntso demaˈriːa]; born 1954) is an Italian-Canadian businessman and alleged mobster originally from Calabria, Italy, now based in Mississauga, Ontario, Canada. In 1982, DeMaria was convicted of murder, and upon his release in 1990, has since been involved in constant parole hearings and deportation disputes. A 2010 Italian police report named DeMaria as one of the top Greater Toronto Area leaders in the 'Ndrangheta's Siderno Group. He also had a seat on the Camera di Controllo.

== Early life and conviction of murder ==
DeMaria was born in 1954, in Siderno, Calabria, Italy, to Carlo and Rosina DeMaria, the firstborn of nine children. DeMaria immigrated with his family to Canada, arriving by ship at nine months old, on January 31, 1955, docking at Pier 21 in Halifax, Nova Scotia, before moving on to Toronto, Ontario. In 1974, DeMaria married a woman named Linda. DeMaria never became a Canadian citizen, and between 1978 and 1981, he was arrested six times on charges ranging from carrying a concealed weapon to extortion, but all charges were either withdrawn or dismissed. DeMaria's family own Angel's Bakery in the Corso Italia neighbourhood, the site of two arsons during the nights of September 29 and October 1, 2017.

On September 20, 1982, DeMaria was convicted of second-degree murder for shooting Vincenzo Figliomeni, a man who owed him a $2,000 debt, behind a fruit market in Little Italy on April 22, 1981. At his trial, he said he had acted in self-defence, but evidence showed his victim was shot seven times in the back. For the murder, DeMaria was sentenced to 10 years, and served time in Millhaven maximum-security prison in Kingston and a medium-security prison in Joyceville. In 1985, DeMaria had filed a lawsuit after he was transferred back to a maximum-security prison based on a suspicion he smuggled cyanide into prison. When he faced no discipline or charge, and no cyanide was ever found, he took the warden to court and won a transfer back to medium-security. On another occasion in 1987, DeMaria was transferred to Millhaven from Joyceville after calling the office of then-Toronto MP John Nunziata about the prison conditions. He again took the prison to court and forced a reversal of his transfer and a judicial rebuke against the warden.

DeMaria was granted day parole in 1990 and full parole in 1992, for life.

== Parole violations and hearings ==
DeMaria was described in a 2009 police intelligence report as an "accomplice in the 2000 murder of Gaetano Panepinto", who was killed in October 2000 in Toronto, allegedly executed by Salvatore Calautti.

DeMaria has worked as a baker and operated a financial services company, Invicta Financial. On April 20, 2009, DeMaria was arrested at Invicta Financial on a parole violation, and was sent back to prison for consorting with mafia associates and violating the conditions of his release. Photographs of Toronto mobster Carmine Verduci meeting with DeMaria on October 2, 2008, were used at DeMaria’s parole hearing to justify placing tighter parole restrictions on him.

On November 14, 2013, DeMaria was arrested again when the province's Repeat Offender Parole Enforcement Squad arrested him at his Mississauga home. Based on "reliable and persuasive" information "provided by numerous police agencies," the Parole Board of Canada found he had violated parole conditions that prohibit him from associating with anyone known to be involved in crime. The board found he breached that condition when he attended two family weddings, one on February 25, 2012, and the other on June 23, 2012; one of which was Angelo Musitano's wedding of the Hamilton Musitano crime family. The board revoked his parole on June 18, 2014, declaring him an "undue risk to public safety." He appealed the decision to the board's appeal division, which upheld it, and then appealed to the Federal Court of Canada. DeMaria complained he was not given details of the allegations made against him by police; that he was refused a third postponement of his hearing; and his request for an oral hearing was denied. Judge Catherine Kane agreed the board was not procedurally fair to DeMaria when it denied him an oral hearing to respond to the police allegations and to address the credibility of the findings against him.

In July 2014, DeMaria's son, Carlo, owner of the Cash House, a payday loan and foreign exchange business, faced 10 charges, including fabricating evidence, identity theft, laundering the proceeds of crime and possession of property obtained by crime, but none of them were laid.

== Deportation hearings ==
In April 2018, the Immigration and Refugee Board of Canada (IRB) issued a deportation order for DeMaria. DeMaria once again appealed to the Federal Court; Judge James Russell issued a 65-page decision on April 18, 2019, weighing the arguments and the evidence which he considered to be "tenuous evidence, to say the least", overturning the IRB deportation order. The judge found that police had not provided evidence that DeMaria was a member of the 'Ndrangheta. Nonetheless, DeMaria remained in prison at Collins Bay Institution since his parole had previously been revoked. In May 2019, a Federal Court decision stated that police had not provided evidence to confirm that he was a "member of 'Ndrangheta"; while the Court agreed that there was "strong suspicion" that he was a mobster, this was "not backed by hard evidence".

Cousins of DeMaria, Giuseppe Gregaraci and his cousin Vincenzo Muià had visited Toronto on March 31, 2019 to meet with Angelo and Cosimo Figliomeni, seeking answers to who had ambushed and killed Muià's brother, Carmelo Muià, in Siderno on January 18, 2018; Muià's smartphone was unwittingly and secretly transmitting his closed-door conversations to authorities in Italy. According to Italian police reports, the two men were picked up from Pearson International Airport by Luigi Vescio, a funeral home owner in the Greater Toronto Area, where they were taken to Angel's Bakery. They were also taken to meet with DeMaria's brother, Giuseppe (Joe) DeMaria. Joe DeMaria and Vescio then drove to Kingston to visit Vincenzo DeMaria in prison. When Muià and Gregaraci returned to Italy, they were arrested, and in January 2020, Gregaraci committed suicide in his prison cell. On August 9, 2019, several former Greater Toronto Area residents were arrested in Calabria, including Joe DeMaria.

On April 27, 2020, the IRB recognized DeMaria's good behaviour while incarcerated and his "chronic kidney issues" which required regular visits to a specialist. It granted him day parole but required that he provide documented financial information. The issue of possible deportation was raised again by the Canada Border Services Agency (CBSA) but the hearing was postponed because of the COVID-19 pandemic in Canada. In May 2020, DeMaria was granted house arrest while he fights the deportation dispute, with conditions, imposed by the IRB. These included that he not communicate directly or indirectly with several alleged or accused mobsters and mob associates who live in Canada and Italy including his brother Joe, his cousin Michele Carabetta, funeral home owner Luigi Vescio, Angelo Figliomeni, Cosimo Figliomeni, Rocco Remo Commisso, Francesco Commisso, or Vincenzo Muià, report monthly to the CBSA, and be in the direct company of his wife Linda or Scott Wilson (a family friend who runs a franchised network of rehabilitation health clinics). Linda paid a $400,000 performance bond, while Wilson gave a $50,000 cash deposit. On October 15, 2020, DeMaria was granted full parole by the IRB.

On December 21, 2023, the IRB ruled that "the Minister did not submit evidence that sufficiently establishes that Mr. DeMaria is a member of the ‘Ndrangheta. The Panel finds that the totality of the Minister’s evidence does not establish a connection between Mr. DeMaria and his membership in the ‘Ndrangheta on reasonable grounds to believe." On January 18, 2024, the Minister of Public Safety filed a notice of appeal with the IRB, citing four grounds of dispute with IRB's ruling.

In late 2025, the IRB dismissed the government’s appeal, and confirmed that DeMaria was not deemed inadmissible to Canada.

== The American Department of the Treasury’s Office of Foreign Assets Control (OFAC) sanctions ==
On November 19, 2026 the Department of the Treasury’s Office of Foreign Assets Control (OFAC) sanctioned DeMaria alongside other Canadian ‘Ndrangheta members Angelo Figliomeni, Cosimo Figliomeni, Rocco Remo Commisso, Francesco Commisso and Luigi Vescio Sr. OFAC also designated Luigi Vescio Sr.’s wife, Rose Vescio, and his two children, Luigi Vescio Jr. and Laura Vescio, for their roles in owning and operating the Vescio Funeral Homes on behalf of Luigi Vescio Sr.
