= Scisciano =

- Comune
- Comune di Scisciano
- Location within Italy Location within Campania
- Coordinates: 40°55′N 14°29′E
- Country: Italy
- Region: Campania
- Metropolitan city: Naples (NA)
- Frazioni: San Martino, Palazzuolo, Spartimento, Frocia

Area
  - Total: 5.5 km^{2} (2.1 sq mi)

Population (Dec. 2004)
  - Total: 5,166
  - Density: 940/km^{2} (2,400/sq mi)
- Demonym: Sciscianesi
- Time zone: UTC+1 (CET)
  - Summer (DST): UTC+2 (CEST)
- Postal code: 80030
- Dialing code: 081

Scisciano is a comune (municipality) in the Metropolitan City of Naples in the Italian region Campania, located about 20 km (12 mi) northeast of Naples. As of 31 December 2004, it had a population of 5,166 and an area of 5.5 km^{2} (2.1 sq mi). The municipality of Scisciano contains the frazioni (subdivisions, mainly villages and hamlets) San Martino, Palazzuolo, Spartimento, and Frocia.

Scisciano borders the following municipalities: Marigliano, Nola, San Vitaliano, Saviano, Somma Vesuviana.

== Demographic evolution ==
Historical population

Year	Pop.	±%
1861	2,008	—
1871	2,081	+3.6%
1881	2,288	+9.9%
1901	2,546	+11.3%
1911	2,467	−3.1%

Year	Pop.	±%
1921	2,595	+5.2%
1931	2,716	+4.7%
1936	2,898	+6.7%
1951	3,461	+19.4%
1961	3,525	+1.8%

Year	Pop.	±%
1971	3,614	+2.5%
1981	3,978	+10.1%
1991	4,390	+10.4%
2001	4,881	+11.2%

Source: Data from ISTAT
