= Salvatore Miceli =

Member of the Sicilian Mafia

- Mug shot of Salvatore Miceli in 1993
- Born: 12 April 1946 (age 80); Salemi, Italy
- Allegiance: Sicilian Mafia

Salvatore Miceli (Italian: [salvaˈtoːre miˈtʃɛːli]; born 12 April 1946, in Salemi) is a member of the Sicilian Mafia. He was on the "Most wanted list" of the Italian Ministry of the Interior from 2001 until his arrest in Venezuela in June 2009. Some Mafia turncoats (pentiti) referred to Miceli as the Minister of Foreign Affairs, due to his frequent trips abroad. Others called him "the chicken that lays golden eggs", referring to his lucrative drug business.

== Drug trafficker ==
Miceli was born in Salemi, Italy, in the province of Trapani. He was the grandson of the notorious heroin trafficker Salvatore Zizzo. Together with Roberto Pannunzi, he is considered to be the intermediary between the Mafia and the Calabrian 'Ndrangheta clans with Colombian cocaine cartels. The two had met when they were living in Toronto, Ontario, Canada in the 1960s and 1970s. They became close friends and Pannunzi became the godfather of Miceli's firstborn. The relation between the Calabrian and the Sicilian mafioso also was very useful for drug trafficking.

Both were involved in a cocaine trafficking network with Mariano Agate, the Mafia boss of Mazara del Vallo and Calabrian clans of Marando, Trimboli and Barbaro from Platì. When one of the cocaine transports to Greece went wrong, Miceli was taken hostage by the Colombian suppliers. He was moved towards a hacienda in the Colombian jungle and only to be released when the damage of losing 900 kilogrammes of cocaine, some 22.5 million US dollars, would be repaid. He was only released when Pannunzi guaranteed the money through his Calabrian contacts.

The entire ring was dismantled in May 2003 – but Miceli remained at large. His wife Veronica Dudzinski and his sons Ivano and Mario Miceli were arrested in May 2003, when the cocaine trafficking network was disrupted.

At the beginning of the 1990s, after a failed cocaine transport, Mafia boss Giovanni Brusca also condemned Miceli to death. However, he was saved thanks to the intervention of Vincenzo Sinacori and Matteo Messina Denaro – the boss of Castelvetrano – who made clear that Miceli belonged to the Mafia in the province of Trapani, and that the "palermitani" could not act against him without the permission of the Mafia bosses of Trapani.

== Arrest ==
On 20 June 2009, Salvatore Miceli was arrested by police in Caracas, Venezuela. The arrest was made after a joint operation between Italian and Venezuelan authorities and Interpol agents. He was apprehended as he left his house on Sunday, along with two other unnamed Italian suspects. Miceli, who had been on the run from authorities since 2001, had been under police surveillance for three days prior to his arrest. The former head of Italy's Antimafia parliamentary commission, Giuseppe Lumia, suggested that Miceli's arrest would be a major blow to the Sicilian Mafia and their trans-Atlantic drug trafficking operations.

Venezuela extradited Miceli to Italy on 30 June 2009, to serve his prison term. He was convicted of drug trafficking and Mafia conspiracy in 2001. Since then he again has been charged for cocaine trafficking between Colombia, Sicily and Calabria.
