= Pietro Scarcella =

ItalianCanadian gangster

- Born: July 12, 1950 (age 76); Castellammare del Golfo, Sicily, Italy
- Other name: Peter
- Citizenship: Canadian
- Occupation: Mobster
- Allegiance: Rizzuto crime family
- Conviction: Conspiracy to commit murder
- Penalty: 9 years' imprisonment (2006)

Pietro "Peter" Scarcella (Italian: [ˈpjɛːtro skarˈtʃɛlla]; born 12 July 1950) is an Italian-Canadian mobster based in Toronto, Ontario, Canada, linked to the Sicilian Rizzuto crime family of Montreal, Quebec.

In the 1970s, Scarcella became the driver of Toronto mobster, Paul Volpe. In the 1980s, Cosimo Commisso planned to murder him along with Volpe, but the plot was later foiled. In 1983, Volpe was found dead in the trunk of his car, and Scarcella is said to be the last one to see Volpe alive before his unsolved murder. In the early to mid 2000s, hostilities developed between Scarcella and rival mob figure Michele Modica. In April 2004, Scarcella devised an assassination attempt of Modica in a North York California Sandwiches shop, but only left an innocent victim, Louise Russo, paralyzed. An associate of Scarcella's, Raffaele Delle Donne, became an informant, which led to Scarcella's 2005 arrest and 2006 sentencing to nine years in prison for conspiracy to commit murder. In 2012, Scarcella was released on a statutory release program.

== Early years with Volpe ==
Scarcella was born on 12 July 1950 in Castellammare del Golfo, Sicily. He immigrated to Canada with his family at the age of nine, and obtained Canadian citizenship in 1971. In the early 1970s, Scarcella worked at a parking lot in downtown Toronto where Paul Volpe, the caporegime of the Buffalo crime family's Toronto-area crew, and his brothers used to park his car. This allowed him to establish a connection with Volpe, as Scarcella became his personal driver.

In 1980, Scarcella was charged in connection with a commissions scam at a disposal company and was found guilty of writing phony invoices. Buffalo crime family was displeased with how Vople operated in Toronto and Hamilton. In 1981, Rocco Remo and Cosimo Commisso of the Commisso family of Toronto hired former Satan's Choice MC hitman Cecil Kirby to kill Scarcella and Volpe. However, the plot was foiled when Kirby turned Royal Canadian Mounted Police informant. During a conversation on 31 March 1981, Commisso told Kirby that he needed the approval of an unnamed higher authority before he could give the orders to kill Volpe. When Kirby asked "What about Volpe?", Commisso replied: "I'm waiting for an answer, OK?" On 23 April 1981, Commisso told Kirby that Scarcella could not be killed until he received permission from the unnamed authority, but he had the approval to kill Volpe. Commisso stated: "Ah, Scarcella, forget about it for now. Just don't worry about it for now", leading Kirby to ask "For how long?". Commisso replied: "A month, two months, we don't know yet. There's another guy". When Kirby asked "What the fuck is going on?", Commisso answered: "There's another guy I want you to take care of instead of him." Kirby later testified against Rocco Remo and Cosimo Commisso in 1982, and were arrested by the RCMP and charged with conspiracy to commit murder.

Scarcella moved up in Volpe's organization, having a hand in running the gambling and loan-sharking operations, while also working on schemes where they would be paid kickbacks from both the union and the developers for negotiating construction contracts. However, in November 1983, Volpe was found dead in the trunk of his BMW at Pearson International Airport; Scarcella is said to be the last one to see Volpe alive before his unsolved murder. After Volpe's death, Scarcella forged closer ties with the Montreal Mafia, the Rizzuto crime family, who were also Sicilian. On 29 January 2002, Juan Ramon Fernandez, the Toronto agent of the Rizzuto family, was recorded in a wiretapped phone call to the Hells Angel Steven "Tiger" Lindsay discussing having Scarcella murder Constantin "Big Gus" Alvizos, whom Fernandez accused of stealing $600,000 from the Rizzuto family.

== Attempted hit on Modica ==
In the early to mid 2000s, hostilities developed between Scarcella and former associate Michele Modica, who owed $130,000 to him and the Hells Angels. Another mobster, Salvatore Calautti ran up over $200,000 in gambling debts to the Rizzuto family and the Hells Angels; refusing to pay, the debt was believed to be assumed by Modica. This led to the April 21, 2004, attempted assassination of Modica in a North York California Sandwiches shop, leaving an innocent victim, mother of three children, Louise Russo paralyzed, while Modica and his associates escaped unscathed. Scarcella's nephew Antonio Borrelli had sprayed bullets with an AR-15 assault rifle from a van including Hells Angels bikers Paris Christoforou and Mark Peretz as the driver. Modica was later deported to Sicily.

== Prison time and later release ==
An associate of Scarcella's Raffaele Delle Donne, who had arranged the meeting to unsuspectingly double cross Modica under Scarcella's orders, was also in the shop at the time of the attempted hit. Delle Donne soon turned informant voluntarily to help put those involved in injuring an innocent bystander in jail. Delle Donne worked with police for 13 months wearing wiretaps, and on April 14, 2005, Scarcella, Peretz, Christoforou and Borrelli, were arrested. In April 2006, in a plea bargain, Scarcella was convicted of conspiracy to commit murder, and sentenced to nine years in prison along with Peretz and Christoforou, while the shooter Borrelli received 10 years in prison. During the 2006 sentencing, Russo was paid $2 million in restitution from the mobsters to cover costs of rehabilitation and increased living expenses.

On April 1, 2007, Scarcella was stabbed six times in the chest in Millhaven maximum security penitentiary, taken to Kingston General Hospital and returned to prison the following week, but kept away from other prisoners. He moved to Beaver Creek Institution in 2009. In 2009, Scarcella recommended that Martino Caputo should start working with Nick Nero when the latter was released on parole. On 11 April 2012, Scarcella was released on a statutory release program.

== Books ==
- Cédilot, André; Noël, André (2011). Mafia Inc The Long, Bloody Reign of Canada's Sicilian Clan. Toronto: Random House of Canada. ISBN 978-0-30736040-3.
- Edwards, Peter; Nájera, Luis (2021). The Wolfpack The Millennial Mobsters Who Brought Chaos and the Cartels to the Canadian Underworl. Toronto: Random House of Canada. ISBN 9780735275409.
