= Antonio Caponigro =

American mobster

- Mugshot of Caponigro from 1970s
- Born: Antonio Rocco Caponigro; January 22, 1912; Chicago, Illinois, U.S.
- Died: April 18, 1980 (aged 68); The Bronx, New York City, U.S.
- Cause of death: Gunshots
- Other name: Tony Bananas
- Allegiance: Philadelphia crime family

Antonio Rocco Caponigro (January 22, 1912 – April 18, 1980), also known as Tony Bananas, was an American mafioso who was the consigliere of Angelo Bruno in the Philadelphia crime family. He is known for ending the peaceful Bruno regime by ordering Bruno's murder over a dispute concerning the drug trade.

== Early life ==
Caponigro was born in Chicago, Illinois in 1912. He operated in the Ironbound neighborhood of Newark, New Jersey. As a made member of the Philadelphia crime family in the 1950s and 1960s, he became a recognized crime figure after being identified by mob turncoat Joseph Valachi in 1963. During that time he served under capo Riccardo Biondi. He was the son of a wealthy banana merchant who owned and managed a stand at the Italian Market, otherwise known as the South 9th Street Curb Market.

He lived in Short Hills, New Jersey. He had a wife, Kathleen, who died in 1991. He also had a half-sister, Susan, who had a daughter out of wedlock by the name of Teresa. Susan Caponigro married Alfred Salerno.

== Rise to power ==
He rose in rank to become the consigliere during the 1970s. Caponigro foresaw the end of the peaceful Angelo Bruno regime and decided to hasten it. Indictments for racketeering were being brought against the ailing Bruno, and there was no leadership in the illicit drug industry. Caponigro knew that he could count on the support of several key members of Bruno's administration after the don died.

Accordingly, Caponigro traveled to New York City to consult his "friend" Frank Tieri, from the Genovese crime family. Caponigro controlled a lucrative numbers game in Newark, New Jersey, a holdover from the 1960s when the New York families had ceded parts of North Jersey to the Philadelphia crime family. Tieri also had activities in the area, and he had challenged Caponigro's incursion. Caponigro appealed the territorial dispute to The Commission, which, acting on Bruno's recommendation, ruled in favor of Caponigro.

Caponigro approached Tieri with a plan to murder Bruno and take over the Philadelphia crime family. Tieri assured Caponigro that he would support him before the Commission. He returned to Philadelphia believing that his planned coup was now officially sanctioned. He recruited the support of his brother-in-law Alfred Salerno (no relation to mob turncoat Joseph Salerno or mob front boss Anthony Salerno) and Bruno regime capos John Simone and Frank Sindone, and ordered the assassination.

== Murder and discovery of body ==
Bruno was shot dead, while his driver, John Stanfa, was wounded while they were parked outside Bruno's Philadelphia home on March 21, 1980. When the Commission learned of Bruno's murder, Caponigro was summoned at once. He was told that the murder had not been considered, let alone sanctioned, by the Commission. He turned helplessly to Frank Tieri, who sat in on the meeting. When he identified Tieri as the man who had authorized the murder, Tieri categorically denied it. The Commission ruled that Caponigro had murdered a Commission member without authorization. On April 18, 1980, Caponigro and his brother-in-law, Alfred Salerno, were found dead, battered and nude in the trunk of a car in The Bronx, having presumably been tortured.

== Aftermath ==
The death of Angelo Bruno, his consigliere, and two capos threw the Philadelphia crime family wide open. With New York's blessing, Angelo Bruno's surviving underboss, Phil Testa, was appointed the new boss. After Caponigro murdered Bruno, Nicky Scarfo could return from his appointed exile in Atlantic City, New Jersey. Testa appointed narcotics trafficker Peter Casella as underboss and Scarfo as consigliere.

== Portrayal in media ==
Caponigro is portrayed by British actor Alex Giannini in Legend (2015), a biographical film about the Kray twins.

== See also ==
- List of unsolved murders (1980–1999)
