= Agueci brothers =

Sicilian mafiosi

Alberto (Italian: [alˈbɛrto]; 1922–November 1961) and Vito Agueci (Italian: [ˈviːto aˈɡwɛːtʃi]), also known as the Agueci brothers, were Sicilian mafiosi who were involved in the French Connection heroin smuggling ring from Europe into the United States and Canada during the late 1950s and early 1960s, closely connected to Hamilton, Ontario mobster Johnny Papalia and the Buffalo crime family.

== Early life ==
Alberto was born in 1922 in Trapani, Sicily, Italy, and immigrated to Canada in 1950 after he was turned away from the United States, settling in Windsor, Ontario where he worked in construction, soon after resettling in Toronto as co-owner of a bakery. In the late 1950s, he moved to Hamilton where the two brothers became involved in the French Connection with Johnny Papalia, as well as Papalia's vending machine businesses with Alberto.

== Arrest ==
With the help of Salvatore Valenti in Sicily, much of the heroin would come over through Sicilian immigrants in their suitcases as they embarked for the New York City pier. In October 1960, smugglers Salvatore Rinaldo and Matteo Palmeri were arrested as they picked up a trunk of heroin, turning informant. This led to the indictment of 20 men, including the Agueci brothers and Papalia on 22 May 1961. Alberto was arrested on 5 May 1961, after Toronto police found him carrying two capsules of heroin. By September 1961, Alberto was extradited and awaiting trial in New York. After paying tributes to Buffalo crime family boss Stefano Magaddino on profits coming in from the heroin ring, when Alberto was in jail, he expected Magaddino to raise his bail money, but when Magaddino did not, his anger grew and threatened to inform to the police. Alberto finally made bail by selling his home and borrowing money from a friend.

== Death ==
On 8 October 1961, Alberto left his wife Vita and his daughters in Toronto for a court appearance in New York. His charred body was found in a cornfield in Penfield, New York by hunters, on 23 November 1961. A subsequent investigation found that he was tortured over a period of several days. When he was found, several of his teeth were knocked out, his ribs were broken, his skull was fractured, his genitals were missing, and he had been trussed with barbed wire, strangled, and burned. The medical examiner determined that he had been dead for two weeks, and that animals had consumed large parts of his flesh. No charges were ever laid relating to Alberto's torture-murder, however it is believed Magaddino ordered his murder due to his instability. The court found that Alberto violated the conditions of his bail and refused to return the $20,000 to his family, leaving his wife and daughters destitute.

On 27 December 1962, Vito was sentenced to 15 years in prison for narcotics charges.
