= Asau Tran =

- Born: 1952/1953; Vietnam
- Died: August 16, 1991 (aged 38); Toronto, Ontario, Canada
- Cause of death: Gunshot wound (homicide)

Asau "Johnny" Tran (1952/1953 – August 16, 1991) was the former ring-leader of a large Vietnamese mob in Toronto during the 1980s, until his death in 1991.

== Background ==
Tran had immigrated to Canada in the early 1980s as a refugee from the Vietnam War, where he moved into the United States and settled in Los Angeles, only to be deported back to Canada. Under Canadian immigration law, Tran was not allowed to be sent back to Vietnam, where he could have faced the death penalty.

In Toronto, Tran was known to have had established a gang of more than one hundred people through active recruitment and the assimilation of members from existing gangs, where he was known for running protection rackets, extorting from Chinese entertainers in Toronto and for running a juvenile prostitution ring. In 1986, Tran and twenty-seven other gang members were hit with a total of eighty-eight charges by the Asian Crime Squad in Toronto.

== Death ==
In 1991, Tran was shot more than thirty times in his face and knees in downtown Toronto on Dundas Street alongside his girlfriend outside a restaurant. Police believe that his murder was a result of unpaid gaming debts. One week prior to his death, during a television interview with reporter Isabel Bassett, Tran stated that he predicted he would be shot, since Vietnamese gang leaders rarely reach the age of forty. He was quoted having said, "These guys – one of these groups may not let me stay alive."

== See also ==
- List of unsolved murders (1980–1999)
