= Whitney gang =

- Founding location: Liverpool, England, United Kingdom
- Years active: 1980s?–2011
- Territory: Anfield
- Ethnicity: English
- Membership: 17 members and associates
- Criminal activities: Drug trafficking

The Whitney gang or Whitney family were a notorious family gang from the Anfield district of Liverpool. In November 2011, the family and their associates were sentenced to a total of 82 years in prison for conspiracy to supply Class A drugs, with individual sentences ranging from two to nine years.

== Members ==
=== Whitney family ===
- Carol Whitney
- Leslie Whitney
- Lisa Whitney
- Paul Whitney
- Anthony "Tony" Whitney
- Gary Whitney (deceased 2006)

=== Associates ===
- Emma Mackenzie
- Mary McCabe
- Gary Edwards
- Thomas Dowd deceased
- Michael O'Toole
- Matthew Nayor
- Neil Brady
- Craig Rees
- Rodney Rees
- Wayne Hincks
- Michael Waters

== Conviction and imprisonment ==
All members were jailed for a total of 82 years in November 2011. The last member to be extradited from Spain was Anthony "Tony" Whitney from his home in Dénia where he got mixed up in another smuggling plot, and was apprehended for smuggling 50,000 tablets of an ecstasy-type substance. Emma Mackenzie was sentenced to 834 days in prison – a "significantly shorter and more lenient sentence" than she could have expected if not for her two-year-old daughter. She was subsequently released from court, having already served half her sentence on remand.
