= Michele Modica =

Sicilian criminal

Michele Modica (Italian pronunciation: [miˈkɛːle ˈmɔːdika]; born 1955) is an Italian businessman who has been active in organized crime in the United States and Canada.

== From New York to Toronto ==
Born in Sicily, Modica was convicted in his native Italy of gangsterism. In the 1980s, he was an illegal immigrant to the United States where he lived in New York City. Modica was a member of the Gambino family, where he was considered to be a good earner. He was convicted of heroin trafficking, and was deported back to Italy in 2000 after serving a long prison sentence. Frank Cali, a Gambino family capo arranged for the Rizzuto family of Montreal to take Modica under their wing and to let him work in Toronto under the supervision of Pietro Scarcella. A policeman who asked not to be named told the journalist Rob Lamberti: "Modica is the guy who had a beef in New York. He's a Gambino guy involved in the drug trade and he was causing problems for the Gambinos in New York. They had to look after him. Because he’s related by blood, the Gambinos, they asked a favour, for the Canadians up here to look after him. So who looks after him?" Modica arrived in Canada in the spring of 2000 illegally and lived under aliases Carlo Martoni and Antonio Reta.

Scarcella put Modica to work as a loan shark and lent him $300,000 in venture capital. Modica spurned loan sharking, which promised him a monthly income of about $30,000 and instead invested the money in the more profitable, but risky business of selling heroin. Modica's decision to move into selling heroin, a business reserved for the Hells Angels along with other members of the Rizzuto family caused much tension. In addition, Modica moved into debt collection and illegal gambling machines while showing little respect for the long established gangsters in Toronto. On June 19, 2001, Modica was arrested in Toronto on charges of possession of stolen property. Modica, who was in Canada illegally, made a deal with the Crown under which he would return to Italy at his own expense in exchange for the Crown staying the charges against him. Modica left Canada in June 2001 and returned illegally in April 2003, again under an alias. During his second stay in Canada, Modica allied himself with Michael Marrese and Salvatore Calautti. Calautti, a gambling addict lost $200,000 via the Platinum SportsBook gambling website. The principle investors in Platinum SportsBook were the Rizzuto family of Montreal, the London, Ontario chapter of the Hells Angels and various gangsters from York Region. As Modica outranked Calautti in the Mafia, he was made responsible for his debts. On April 9, 2004, a meeting was held at the Marriott Courtyard Hotel in Woodbridge to discuss the question of Calautti's debts. Modica proposed that Calautti pay the principle while the interest be written off. Calautti stated that he already paid the principle to Modica, which led to suspicions that Calautti was telling the truth and that Modica had cheated both Calautti and his creditors. Hostilities also developed between Modica and former associate Pietro Scarcella who Modica owed $130,000 to him and the Hells Angels.

== Attempted murder ==
On April 21, 2004, Modica visited a restaurant, California Sandwiches, in north Toronto along with his bodyguards Andrea Fortunato Carbone and Pietro Scaduto. As Modica sat down, a van cruised by and gunmen opened fire. Scarcella's nephew Antonio Borrelli had sprayed bullets with an AR-15 assault rifle from a van including Hells Angels bikers Paris Christoforou and Mark Peretz as the driver. Louise Russo, an innocent victim and mother of three children, was left paralyzed, while Modica and his associates escaped unscathed. Calautti was not one of the shooters in the attempted assassination. Modica was arrested at the Queens Quay in Toronto on charges of being in Canada illegally and was deported to Sicily on May 21, 2004. In an attempt to feign sympathy, Modica faked a heart attack when he was arrested.

In 2008, Modica was arrested in Italy by the Carabinieri as part of Operation Old Bridge, a joint operation that involved law enforcement in the United States and Italy. Modica was arrested on July 12, 2008 in Palermo on charges of conspiring to murder Pietro Lo Iacono, a Mafia boss. The Carabinieri alleged that after killing Lo Iacono that Modica planned to return to Canada. Modica was convicted of conspiracy to commit murder and later released from prison in April 2014. Lorenzo Carbone, a mafioso who turned pentito testified that Modica's former bodyguard Pietro Scaduto was planning to have him killed once he was released from prison.

== Books ==
- Edwards, Peter; Nicaso, Antonio (2015). Business Or Blood Mafia Boss Vito Rizzuto's Last War. Toronto: Random House of Canada. ISBN 978-0-345-81376-3.
