= Donald Angelini =

Mobster

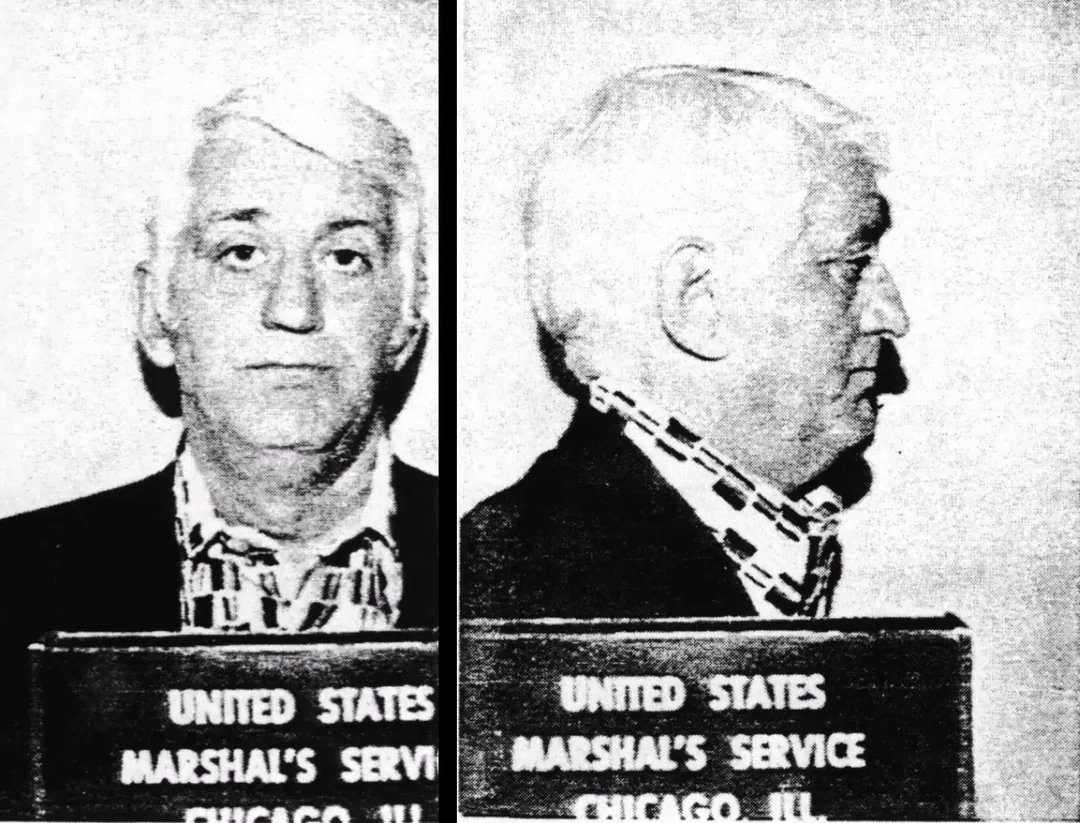
- Angelini's mugshot
- Born: September 30, 1926; Chicago, Illinois, U.S.
- Died: December 6, 2000 (aged 74)
- Other name: "The Wizard of Odds"
- Occupation: Mobster
- Allegiance: Chicago Outfit

Donald Angelini (September 30, 1926 – December 6, 2000), nicknamed "The Wizard of Odds", was an American mobster who specialized in gambling operations for the Chicago Outfit crime family.

== Career ==
After years in the Outfit, Angelini became the caporegime for a crew operating illegal gambling rackets in Elmhurst, Illinois. Angelini operated a highly successful sports-betting empire along with Dominic Cortina. He was the brother-in-law to Chicago Outfit mobster Michael Caracci.

In 1986, Angelini became the Outfit's enforcer in Las Vegas; his job was to protect the Outfit's illegal casino profits. Angelini replaced Chicago mobster Tony "The Ant" Spilotro in running the skim. Tony Spilotro and his brother, Michael Spilotro, had been killed by the Chicago Outfit. White-haired, trim, and very well-spoken with a pleasant smile, Angelini was a total opposite of the brutal Spilotro. Angelini found himself operating with a new crew in Las Vegas at a time when the Outfit's flagship casinos were badly crimped due to federal investigations. However, Angelini himself avoided arrest while there.

In the late 1980s, Angelini, Sam "Wings" Carlisi, and John "No Nose" DiFronzo attempted to extend Outfit influence over the gambling operations of the Rincon Indian Reservation near San Diego, California. Their objective was to skim profits off the casino profits there. In 1989, Angelini was sentenced to 37 months in prison on gambling and Racketeer Influenced and Corrupt Organizations Act (RICO) charges resulting from the Rincon operation. On October 14, 1994, Angelini was released from prison.

== Death ==
Donald Angelini died on December 6, 2000.
