= Roberto Pannunzi =

Italian criminal

Roberto Pannunzi (Italian: [roˈbɛrto panˈnuntsi]; born 1948) is an Italian criminal linked to the 'Ndrangheta, a Mafia-type organisation in Calabria. He is one of the top cocaine brokers for the Sicilian Mafia and the 'Ndrangheta with the Colombian cocaine cartels. He has been described as "Europe's most wanted drugs trafficker", and the "biggest cocaine trafficker in the world", the equivalent of Pablo Escobar, the head of the Colombian Medellín Cartel. According to the United States Drug Enforcement Administration (DEA), the drug trafficking activities of Pannunzi have been documented for over 30 years.

== Early years ==
Pannunzi was born in Rome in 1948. also known as Bebè (Baby), His father came from Rome but his mother from Calabria, kindred with the Macrì 'Ndrangheta clan from Siderno in Calabria. He is a former employee of Alitalia. As a boy, he moved to Canada with his family. In Toronto he became a pupil of Antonio Macrì, the Calabrian 'Ndrangheta boss from Siderno.

While in Toronto, he met Salvatore Miceli, a Sicilian mafioso. They became close friends, and Pannunzi became the godfather of Miceli's firstborn. The relationship between the Calabrian and the Sicilian mafioso was also very useful for drug trafficking because of their connection in both criminal organisations.

== Heroin trafficker ==
Back in Rome, he ran an upmarket fashion boutique, "Il Papavero" ("The Poppy"), as a cover in the 1980s when he was making his way in the poppy business. In the late 1970s and 1980s he was involved in heroin trafficking with the Sicilian Mafiosi Gaetano Badalamenti and Gerlando Alberti, organizing shipments from Turkey through Italy to the United States. He put them in contact with Corsican gangsters from Marseille and convinced the chemist André Bousquet an old hand from the French Connection days, to set up a heroin-refining lab on Sicily. He also traded heroin to the U.S. on behalf of the Mafia bosses from Palermo Stefano Bontade and Salvatore Inzerillo.

In 1989, Pannunzi was not involved in setting up a heroin lab near Brescia in northern Italy together with the Barbaro and Sergi 'Ndrangheta clans from Platì. The lab was discovered on 21 May 1990, in a farmhouse Valsecca, while French Connection chemists Alain Mazza and Gilles Pairone were refining 20 kilograms of heroin. Pannunzi was one of the first to understand that there was a lot more money to be made with cocaine, which was rapidly becoming the new drug of choice among the affluent. He set up a very profitable deal, trading 1 kilogram of heroin for 25 kilograms of cocaine in the U.S. using the differences in availability on both markets. As a result of the police dismantling the operation, an arrest warrant was issued against Pannunzi for drug trafficking and criminal association.

== Moving to Colombia ==
Pannunzi started to contact Colombian traffickers in Venezuela, Amsterdam and Madrid. He moved to Colombia where he would become one of the most important cocaine brokers for both the Sicilian Mafia and the Calabrian 'Ndrangheta with the Colombian cocaine cartels. According to the deputy chief prosecutor in Reggio Calabria, Nicola Gratteri, Pannunzi would become "the only one who can sell both to the 'Ndrangheta and to Cosa Nostra. He is definitely the most powerful drug broker in the world". According to crime writer Roberto Saviano, he traded cocaine to rival Italian crime families: "He collected money from the various families, often rival families."

At the height of his criminal career, he was trading 1,500 to 2,000 kilograms of cocaine a month. On a tapped phone, he was overheard boasting of the ease and confidence with which he handled his Colombian suppliers. To reinforce the bonds with his Colombian suppliers, Pannunzi arranged his son Alessandro Pannunzi's marriage with a notorious family from the Medellín Cartel.

== First arrest, in Colombia ==
He was first arrested on January 28, 1994, in Medellín, Colombia, while attending the funeral of a Colombian friend. He had tried to bribe the policeman who arrested him offering one million US dollars. When he was visited in prison by an Italian police officer he boasted about the huge investments in property and precious stones in Canada, Australia, Medellín and Rome. He had unrestricted use of a cellular phone throughout the year he spent in prison in Colombia before his extradition to Italy, and hence was able to continue his business.

Pannunzi was extradited to Italy in December 1994, but managed to escape in 1998 taking advantage of a temporary medical release. The next day he was on the run. He became a fugitive based in Colombia. In 1999, he was included in the list of most wanted fugitives in Italy.

== Second arrest, in Spain ==
He was arrested again on 5 April 2004, in Madrid, Spain, together with his son Alessandro Pannunzi and his right-hand man and son-in-law Francesco Antonio Bumbaca, married to his daughter Simona. The arrests completed an investigation, known as Operation Igres, that resulted in a total of 42 arrests in three countries. In 2001 and 2002, the organization arranged shipments of over eight tons of cocaine from Colombia to be distributed to Italian crime groups in Europe. The extended network operated in Colombia, Peru, Venezuela, Portugal, Spain, Greece, South Africa, Switzerland, and the Netherlands. "Every important criminal figure went to him," according to Diego Trotta, a member of an elite police squad that captured Pannunzi. Pannunzi was working with the 'Ndrangheta from the town of Platì, notably Paolo Sergi and Pasquale Marando, and Salvatore Miceli, a Sicilian Mafia boss based in Venezuela with links to Giuseppe Guttadauro from the Mafia family from Brancaccio in Palermo.

In 2010, he managed to escape from a private hospital in Rome, where he was being treated for heart disease.

== Third arrest, in Colombia ==
On 5 July 2013, he was captured again in a shopping mall in Bogotá, in a joint operation between the Colombian police and the DEA. He was immediately deported to Italy to prevent a lengthy extradition procedure, to serve a 16 1/2-year sentence in Italy. "He is the biggest cocaine importer in the world", said Nicola Gratteri, deputy chief prosecutor in Reggio Calabria, when he was detained. "He is the only one who can organise purchases and sales of cocaine shipments of 3,000 kilos and up." According to crime writer Saviano, "he was a sort of Copernicus of cocaine. He changed the way the business works, he understood the new dynamics of the cocaine market."
