= Dominic Cortina =

American mobster

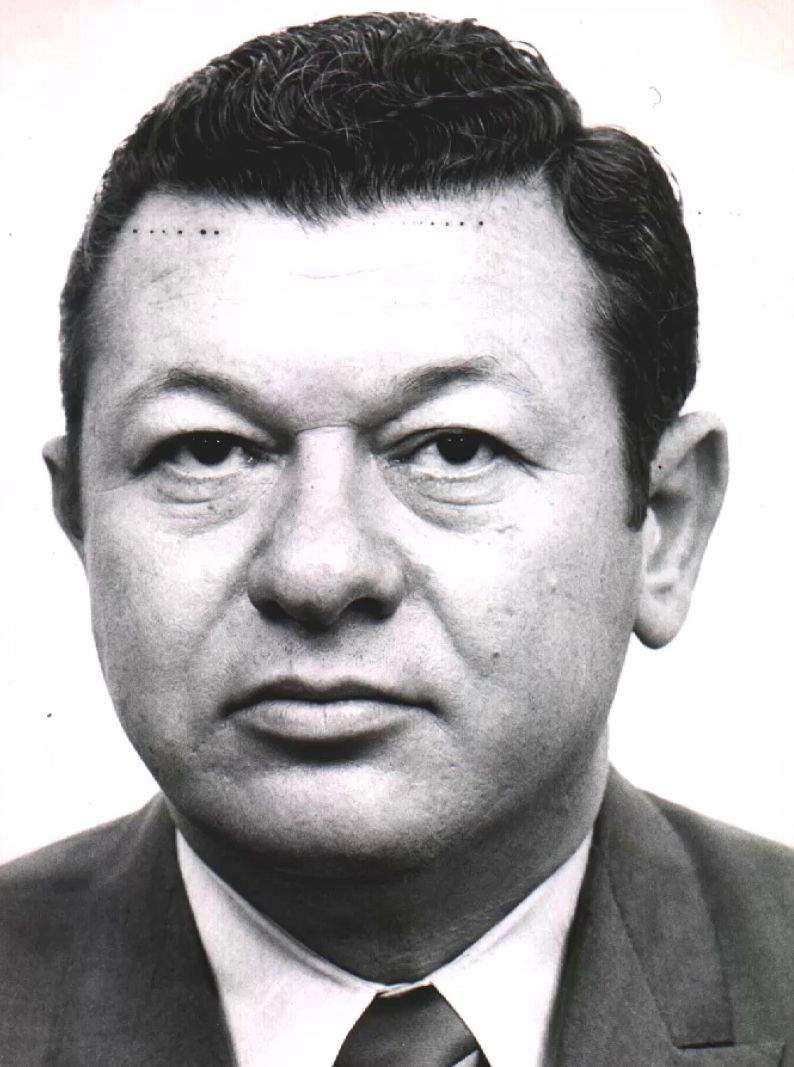
- Born: January 28, 1925; Chicago, Illinois, United States
- Died: November 19, 1999 (aged 74); Chicago, Illinois, United States
- Other names: Big Dom, Large, The Hat
- Occupations: Gangster, member of Chicago Outfit
- Spouse: Jody Cortina
- Children: Pam Cortina, Vicki Annecca, Michael Cortina
- Status: Deceased
- Criminal charges: Gambling, loan sharking, robbery, insurance fraud, conspiracy
- Penalty: 3 years (for gambling), 21 months (for insurance fraud and conspiracy)

Dominic Cortina (January 28, 1925 – November 19, 1999) was an American mobster and high-ranking member of the Chicago Outfit criminal organization, who oversaw gambling. His nicknames were "Big Dom", "Large", and "the Hat."

== Chicago Outfit career ==
In the late 1940s, Cortina famously purchased a cigarette tax stamp machine and reported it stolen. Before it surfaced, millions of dollars in bogus tax stamps had been run off for the mob.

In 1963, Cortina was among associates of the Chicago Outfit named at a United States Senate hearing.

In 1970, Cortina was convicted of federal gambling charges for operating a gambling business across state lines. He was sentenced to three years in prison. The convictions of Cortina and four other alleged gangsters, including that of Jackie Cerone, were touted as a milestone in the FBI's effort to smash coast-to-coast betting rackets on sports.

In 1982, an Illinois legislative investigating committee linked a bingo parlor on Chicago's Northwest Side to Cortina and another reputed syndicate gambling figure, William McGuire.

By the mid-1980s, Cortina was operating a sports betting empire along with Chicago Outfit member Donald Angelini.

In 1987, Cortina and Angelini were sent by Outfit head Joseph Ferriola to assume caretaker roles in Nevada, in the wake of the murder of Anthony Spilotro, who had overseen Chicago Outfit interests there.

On June 22, 1989, Cortina was arrested at his home and charged with conspiring with six others to engage in loan sharking, robbery, insurance fraud, gambling and the illegal import of cars into this country from Europe. The indictment, which was unsealed in Miami, Florida, alleged that Cortina and others had conspired since 1982 to steal and defraud, using a North Miamoi Beach pawn shop as a cover for their activities. Cortina, who also had maintained a home in Naples, Florida, was accused in the indictment of racketeering conspiracy, plotting a home invasion in which an expensive diamond ring was taken, running a bookmaking operation and cheating the government out of payment of tens of thousands of dollars in customs duties on so-called "grey market" cars imported from West Germany.

On November 8, 1989, Cortina, Angelini and an associate, Joseph Spadavecchio, were charged with running a multimillion-dollar sports betting ring between 1982 and 1988. Cortina was alleged to have supervised offices on Chicago's West Side and in its west suburbs that were used to take bets on professional and college football, basketball and baseball games. Cortina, Angelini and Spadavecchio all pleaded guilty to running the sports betting ring. Federal investigators presented evidence showing that the gambling ring operated in 16 locations in Chicago, Oak Park and Bensenville and took in $127,309,188 during that period.

On March 21, 1990, United States District Judge Nicholas John Bua sentenced Cortina and Angelini each to 21 months in prison and ordered each one to pay the $1,210 monthly cost of his imprisonment. Spadavecchio was sentenced to 18 months in federal prison, fined $50,000 and also ordered to pay the cost of his imprisonment. Bua rejected prosecutors' request for sentences of approximately twice those lengths, noting that no federal court anywhere in the U.S. had sentenced individuals convicted of similar crimes to sentences of the length that prosecutors were requesting.

Cortina was released from federal prison in 1992, and later returned to federal prison after being convicted of other charges. He was released from federal prison for good on April 6, 1995.

Cortina never was associated with the violent faction of organized crime. In fact, he and Angelini were known for not strong-arming clients but instead for treating them politely. In some cases, prosecutors said, the duo even suggested that their clients give up gambling for their own well-being.

== Personal life ==
In August 1988, Cortina moved into a one-story home on Windsor Drive in Oak Brook, Illinois. The house backed up to a hotel parking lot, and investigators speculate that Cortina preferred the location because the location would make it more difficult for investigators to learn who was coming to see him. Cortina sold that house in 1994 for $710,000 and moved into a condominium unit nearby.

Cortina died on November 19, 1999, of cancer in a Chicago-area hospice.

Cortina was survived by his wife, Jody; two daughters, Pam Cortina and Vicki Annecca; a son, Michael; and five grandchildren Michelle Cortina, Joseph Cortina, Christine Cortina, and Dominic.
