= Carmine Verduci =

Italian-Canadian mobster

Carmine Verduci (Italian: [ˈkarmine verˈduːtʃi]; May 12, 1959 – April 24, 2014) was an Italian-Canadian mobster from Oppido Mamertina, Calabria, based in Woodbridge, Ontario linked to the Greater Toronto Area 'Ndrangheta group called the Siderno Group. He also had a seat on the Camera di Controllo in Canada.

== Criminal activities ==
Verduci was considered to be the 'Ndrangheta's transatlantic messenger, having "the task of travelling between Italy and Canada, acting as a carrier of news between the Italian group and the Canadians," according to police reports. On February 12, 2008, Italian authorities noticed Verduci in Italy at a meeting of the 'Ndrangheta. Verduci's telephone conversations were intercepted by police in Italy in 2008 and 2009, including talks with Giuseppe Commisso, head of the Commisso 'ndrina in Siderno. On March 8, 2011, Verduci was among 51 individuals whose arrest warrants were issued by Italian authorities for mafia association. Further, prosecutors named about 40 men linked to the "Canadian cell" 'Ndrangheta crime network; many with "operational links" to Italy. The charge against him in Italy meant he could not return there without arrest, but was not grounds either for extradition, as Mafia association is not a crime in Canada, or deportation as he was a Canadian citizen. Police suspected Verduci was smuggling AK-47 assault rifles into the GTA, as well as having arranged heroin shipments from Mexico, and multi-kilo shipments of cocaine.

== Death ==
Verduci was shot to death outside the Regina Sports Café in Woodbridge, Ontario on April 24, 2014. According to police, Verduci was a prime target for Montreal assassins because he had tried to encroach on turf which the Rizzuto crime family considered their own. During the fight to steal turf from boss Vito Rizzuto, Verduci was allegedly part of a group that became involved with Salvatore Montagna, head of the Bonanno crime family of New York City.
