= Frank Tieri (mobster) =

Italian-American mob boss

- Tieri in the 1970s
- Born: Francesco Tieri; February 22, 1904; Castel Gandolfo, Lazio, Kingdom of Italy
- Died: March 29, 1981 (aged 77); New York City, New York, U.S.
- Resting place: Saint John's Cemetery, Queens, New York, U.S.
- Other names: Funzi Tieri; The Old Man
- Occupation: Mobster
- Children: 2
- Allegiance: Genovese crime family
- Conviction: Racketeering (1981)
- Penalty: 10 years' imprisonment

Frank Alphonse "Funzi" Tieri (/tiˈɛəri/; born Francesco Tieri, Italian: [franˈtʃesko ˈtjɛːri]; February 22, 1904 – March 29, 1981) was an Italian-American mobster who eventually became the front boss of the Genovese crime family of New York City

== Early life ==
Tieri was born on February 22, 1904, in Castel Gandolfo, Lazio, Italy, to Carmela Tofano and Augustino Tieri, and had two sisters, Assunta and Antonietta. He immigrated from Naples to New York City with his family in 1911. Tieri was denied U.S. citizenship twice, living as a resident alien in Brooklyn. Tieri lived in a modest home in the Bath Beach section of Brooklyn with his wife and two granddaughters. His mistress, a former opera singer from Italy, lived in a house a few blocks away. Tieri claimed to be an employee of a sportswear manufacturer.

== Boss ==
In 1972, after the murder of Genovese acting boss Thomas Eboli, Tieri became the boss of the Genovese family. At that time, it was speculated that Gambino crime family boss Carlo Gambino had ordered Eboli's murder because Eboli owed him $4 million. According to this theory, Gambino wanted Tieri to be the boss of the Genovese family. However, most experts now believe that Tieri was merely a front for the Genoveses' actual boss, Philip "Benny Squint" Lombardo. Luigi Angelo Martino, "the architect" for money laundering for the Genovese family, served directly under him.

Tieri was considered a low-profile and diplomatic mobster, a good earner for the family who believed in sharing wealth with his capos and soldiers. He was convicted of armed robbery when he was aged twenty but avoided further indictments until the end of his life. Given that Tieri was a front boss, it is unknown how much power Lombardo allowed him. However, Tieri did have a reputation as an orderly and smart manager who used violence only as a last resort.

== Bruno assassination ==
In 1980, Tieri played a key role in the assassination of Philadelphia crime family boss Angelo Bruno and the opening of Atlantic City, New Jersey to the New York crime families. The State of New Jersey had announced the introduction of legal casino gambling in Atlantic City, and the New York families wanted to open operations there. However, Atlantic City belonged to the Philadelphia family, and Bruno wasn't willing to share it. In March 1980, Tieri sent a message to Philadelphia's consigliere, Antonio Caponigro, that the Mafia Commission would support him as boss if he assassinated Bruno. What Caponigro didn't know was that the Commission had no intention of sanctioning Bruno's murder. On March 21, 1980, Bruno was murdered in his car on a Philadelphia street. The Commission immediately summoned Caponigro to New York for a meeting; two weeks later, his body was discovered in New York with $20 bills stuffed in his orifices. However, the New York families did achieve access to Atlantic City.

== Conviction and death ==
Federal prosecutors eventually charged Tieri with being the head of a crime family that was involved in racketeering, extortion and illegal gambling. On January 23, 1981, the ailing Tieri, using a wheelchair and an oxygen tank, was convicted of violating the RICO Act. At the sentencing, Tieri's lawyers argued for leniency, saying that he was dying. Prosecutors told the judge it was an act, and the judge sent Tieri to prison for ten years.

Two months later, on March 29, 1981, Tieri died from an unspecified "long illness" at Mount Sinai Hospital in New York. He is buried in Saint John's Cemetery, Queens, New York.

American Mafia
Preceded by Gerardo Catena	Genovese crime family Underboss; 1972	Succeeded by Carmine Zeccardi
Preceded by Thomas Eboli	Genovese crime family Front boss 1972–1980	Succeeded by Anthony Salerno
