= 1966 in organized crime =

== Events ==
- Shortly after his release from federal prison, Chicago Outfit leader Sam Giancana is forced to leave the United States for Mexico as he is faced with additional federal charges. Coming out of semi-retirement, Tony Accardo decides to take a more hands-on leadership within the Outfit, but places Samuel "Sam Teets" Battaglia out front as boss of the Outfit and Fiore "Fifi" Buccieri as underboss, while Accardo himself heads the Chicago mafia from the shadows.
- Charles LeCicero, a member of the Colombo crime family, is murdered.
- New Jersey loan shark Harold "Kayo" Konigsburg in sent to prison.
- March –
  - In a prelude to the Coonan–Spillane Wars, a local gangster associated with Mickey Spillane is abducted from a Tenth Avenue bar in Hell's Kitchen and taken to Queens where he is murdered in a back alley by a small group led by Jimmy and Jackie Coonan.
  - Eddie Sullivan, a veteran gunman now allied with Coonan's faction, is taken by Spillane gunmen and beaten in the back of the White House bar.
  - While visiting illegal gambling operations between 11th and 12th Avenue, Mickey Spillane is ambushed by Jimmy Coonan who fires a machine gun from a nearby rooftop. Although Spillane and his seven or eight escorts are pinned down, Coonan flees the scene where he runs out of ammunition.
- March 10 – George Cornell is shot dead by Ronnie Kray at the Blind Beggar pub in Whitechapel, London.
- March 24 – Virginia Hill commits suicide in Salzburg, Austria.
- April 1 – Jackie Coonan shoots and kills a local bartender in Queens, and imprisoned in Sing Sing Prison.
- April 4 – During a drunken altercation with two men at an East Side bar, who gangster Eddie Sullivan became convinced were hitmen recently hired by Micky Spillane, were taken to a vacant lot near Cavalry Cemetery in Queen and shot. One of the men who survived the attack, and later testified against Coonan and the others. All four members were indicted including Sullivan was given a life sentence and Coonan, accepting a plea bargain, was sentenced to 5–10 years for felonious assault.
- May – Joseph Bonanno unexpectedly returns to New York where he assumes control from his son, who had since been at war with Gaspar DiGregorio for the leadership of the crime family. The "Troutman St. Ambush" of Bill Bonanno by DiGregorio Faction shooters has brought Joe Bonanno back to N.Y. to rally his troops and supporters against DiGregorio and his Commission supporters. With the sudden return of Bonanno, DiGregorio loses both the support of his remaining gunmen and The Commission withdraws its support due to his inability to lead the Family. Paul Sciacca and Frank Mari are selected by the commission to replace DiGregorio as boss and underboss. The Banana War shootings now come more rapidly.
- May 17 – Joseph Bonanno, after being in hiding for 19 months, officially surrenders to federal authorities at the Foley Square Courthouse. Later that day after appearing before a judge and receiving bail, Joe Bonanno along with his son Salvatore "Bill" Bonanno and several close associates such as his brother-in-law Frank LaBruzzo and Bonanno crime family caporegime, Joseph "Little Joe" Notaro decide to dine at La Scala restaurant in Manhattan. Soon after the various Bonanno associates begin to dine and toasts are made congratulating Joe Bonanno on his return to New York, Joe Notaro appears to be in distress and in need of aide, he has a heart attack and dies right there at the table.
- May 23 – Chicago labor racketeer Benjamin Stein is arrested and imprisoned for 18 months.
- August – Frank LaBruzzo, brother-in-law of New York mafia boss, Joseph "Joe Bananas" Bonanno and a trusted aide to the boss dies of lung cancer only months after the death of Joe Notaro, another longtime Bonanno associate and aide.
- September 22 – A police raid by the NYPD at the LaStella Restaurant in Queens, New York reveals a meeting between New York, Florida and New Orleans mafia members including Carlo Gambino, Tommy Eboli, Joe Colombo, Joey N. Gallo, Mike Miranda, Aniello Dellacroce, Dominic Alongi and Anthony Cirillo from N.Y., Carlos Marcello, Joseph Marcello, Anthony Carolla and Frank Gagliano from New Orleans, along with Santo Trafficante Jr. from Tampa. The meeting, later known as "Little Apalachin Meeting", appeared to be concerning the leadership succession within the Lucchese crime family as longtime boss Thomas Lucchese who had been hospitalized for over a year was terminally ill and basically in retirement. Also on the meeting agenda was allegedly the division of underworld territory and operations in New Orleans. Anthony Carolla, the son of former boss Sylvestro "Silver Dollar Sam" Carolla and a high level member of the New Orleans crime family felt entitled to more of the crime family spoils and a guarantee of ascension to the position of crime family boss once recently named boss, Carlos Marcello eventually retires. Carolla felt that he had been disrespected and ignored by the Marcello regime in New Orleans and deserved to be recognized as a top crime family member being the son of former New Orleans mafia power Sam Carolla. The Commission members present voted in favor of Marcello and decided Carolla should be given control over additional crime family interests, but nothing of importance that would diminish the influence and profits of Marcello. Carolla was not guaranteed the succession, but almost 30 years later became boss in New Orleans.

== Deaths ==
- Charles LeCicero, Colombo crime family member
- Joseph Notaro, Bonanno crime family lieutenant
- March 10 – George Cornell, Richardson Gang member (38)
- March 24 – Virginia Hill, former bagwoman for the Chicago Outfit (49)
- October 1 – Michael "Trigger Mike" Coppola, former caporegime of the 116th Street Crew (66)
