= La Stella Restaurant meeting =

Meeting of the American mafia in 1966

The La Stella Restaurant meeting was a famous convocation of the American Mafia that took place on September 22, 1966. It has been described as the "most important known conclave of Mafia since Apalachin" in 1957. In reference to this and to its comparatively smaller size, it is also referred to as the Little Apalachin meeting.

== Meeting ==
The exact purpose or purposes of the meeting are not known for certain; however, a number of reasons, not mutually exclusive, have been suggested. One of these is to appoint a replacement for Tommy Lucchese, boss of the Lucchese crime family, who was terminally ill. Another is to settle a dispute between Carlos Marcello, boss of the New Orleans crime family, and Anthony Carolla concerning the latter's share of profits; and a third to confirm that Tommy Eboli, Mike Miranda, and Gerardo Catena would jointly run the Genovese crime family.

Mafiosi from Florida, Louisiana, and New York City gathered together at La Stella Restaurant on Queens Boulevard in the Forest Hills neighborhood of Queens. La Stella was a favourite eating spot for local persons involved in organized crime, only a few blocks away from owner Mike Miranda's home. They convened in the private dining room located in the restaurant's basement, seated together at one big table formed by pulling together four separate tables.

Seated at the top was the host, Mike Miranda. To his right were his fellow New Yorkers, the boss of the Colombo crime family Joe Colombo, Tommy Eboli, and Dominick Alongi; to his left was Gambino crime family boss Carlo Gambino, also from New York; Carlos Marcello of Louisiana; and Santo Trafficante Jr. of Florida. Seated at the opposite end of the table was Carlos' younger brother and underboss Joe Marcello, Gambino underboss Aniello Dellacroce, Joe Gallo, Anthony Carolla, Frank Gagliano, and Tony Cirillo.

=== Discovery ===
Police suspicions were aroused when officers who had been tailing Miranda witnessed him entering the restaurant, followed by Gambino and Gallo. Not long afterward, a man whom one officer recognized as Trafficante entered the building. Trafficante is reported to have served as a mediator at the meeting. He flew in alone with a plane ticket purchased under a fake name.

Police entered at approximately 2:30pm. None offered any resistance, or even stood up. They were told to stay seated and a diagram was drawn of who was sitting where. Ralph Salerno described the seating arrangement as "as formal as it could be if the chief of protocol of the State Department had, in fact, put place cards there". All thirteen men were arrested and charged with "consorting with known criminals", and each had bail set at $100,000. The sum total of their bail, $1,300,000, was paid the next day by a bail bondsman with no collateral. They were subsequently released.

=== Aftermath ===
The New York Times responded by sending food critic Craig Claiborne to the restaurant, who gave it a two-star rating. Later, as a show of defiance, some of those arrested returned to La Stella for lunch in the days after their arrest. At this lunch were Trafficante, he and Marcello's lawyer Frank Ragano, Marcello's lawyer Jack Wasserman, Carolla, Gagliano and Joe Marcello. In the presence of the media Marcello joked "Why don't they arrest us again for eating here?", while Trafficante raised his wine glass in a toast. Ragano paid for the meal and explained that they were there "simply because it is the best restaurant in the neighborhood, good food – no other reason". When Time published a photograph of Ragano at this dinner, labeling him a "top Cosa Nostra hoodlum", he sued the magazine for libel, hiring the attorney Melvin Belli to represent him. He lost the case. Wasserman also sued, but due to a technicality in the early proceedings the case went no further.

== See also ==
- Atlantic City Conference, 1929
- Havana Conference, 1946
- Grand Hotel et des Palmes Mafia meeting, 1957
