= Havana Conference =

1946 meeting of US organized crime figures in Cuba

The Havana Conference of 1946 was a meeting of American Mafia and National Crime Syndicate leaders to determine Syndicate policy, rules, and business interests in the new postwar era. The conference is considered to be the most important US organized crime summit since the 1929 Atlantic City Conference. Decisions made in Havana resonated throughout the US in ensuing decades.

The Havana conference was reportedly convened by mob boss Charles "Lucky" Luciano. Delegations representing crime families from across the United States attended. It was held at the Hotel Nacional de Cuba in Havana during the week of December 22, 1946.

== Background ==
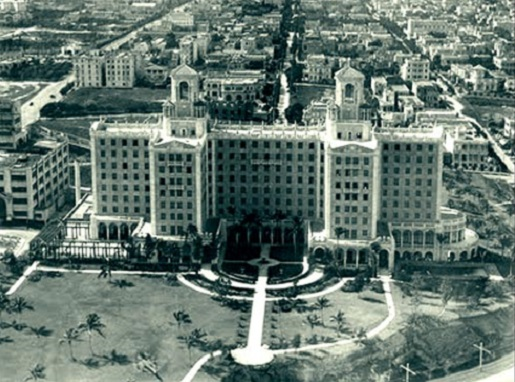
The Hotel Nacional de Cuba, site of the 1946 conference (undated).

The conference took place at the Hotel Nacional de Cuba. The reported organizer of the Havana Conference was crime boss Lucky Luciano. At the beginning of World War II, Luciano was serving a 30-to-50-year prison term for pandering. In 1942, U.S. military intelligence officers approached Joseph "Socks" Lanza and Meyer Lansky with a proposal for Luciano. At that time, Lanza was one of the Mafia bosses who controlled Manhattan's Fulton Fish Market, its workers, and the docks in Lower Manhattan. Lansky had broader power in cities along the Atlantic Seaboard. Military intelligence was worried about possible Nazi sabotage of docks and other shipping facilities in New York and other East Coast ports. The government told Luciano that if his family was able to protect East Coast ports from sabotage, he would be pardoned at the end of the war and deported to Italy as a free man. Luciano agreed to the proposal and assisted the government.

After the war ended, New York Governor Thomas E. Dewey agreed to Luciano's pardon on the condition that he never be allowed back into the U.S. In February 1946, after a lavish farewell party on the ocean liner, Luciano sailed back to Italy. He first settled in Lercara Friddi, Sicily, then moved to Palermo, Naples, and Rome. After being forced out of Rome by Italian police, he finally settled in Naples and immediately started planning a return to the United States.

In early fall 1946, Luciano received a sealed envelope from a recently deported U.S. mafioso, which contained three words, "December-Hotel Nacional." In late September, Luciano obtained two Italian passports issued in his real name, Salvatore Lucania, with visas for Mexico, Cuba, and several South American nations. Luciano was now able to visit the Western Hemisphere and meet with criminal associates from the U.S.

In late October, Luciano traveled from Italy to Caracas, Venezuela, Mexico City, and finally Havana. Lansky greeted his old friend on his arrival in Cuba. Following Luciano's orders, Lansky had organized a conference in Havana the week of December 22 of crime bosses from all over the United States. Lansky quickly suggested that Luciano purchase a $150,000 interest in the Hotel Nacional, a plush casino and hotel owned by Lansky and his silent partner, Cuban president Fulgencio Batista y Zaldívar. Luciano agreed and the Havana Conference was set.

In December 1946, the Havana Conference started as planned. To welcome Luciano back from exile and acknowledge his continued authority within the mob, all the conference invitees brought Luciano cash envelopes. These "Christmas Presents" totalled more than $200,000. At the first night dinner hosted by Lansky, Frank Costello, and Joe Adonis, Luciano was presented with the money. The official cover story for the Havana Conference was that the mobsters were attending a gala party with Frank Sinatra as the entertainment. Sinatra flew to Havana with Al Capone's cousins, Charlie, Rocco, and Joseph Fischetti from Chicago. Joseph "Joe Fish" Fischetti, an old Sinatra acquaintance, acted as Sinatra's chaperone and bodyguard. Charlie and Rocco Fischetti delivered a suitcase containing $2 million to Luciano, his share of the U.S. rackets he still controlled.

The most pressing items on the conference agenda were the leadership and authority within the New York mafia, the mob-controlled Havana casino interests, the narcotics operations, and the West Coast operations of Benjamin "Bugsy" Siegel, especially the new Flamingo Hotel and Casino in Las Vegas. Luciano, absent from the American underworld scene for several months, was especially concerned with the situation in New York. Boss Vito Genovese had returned to New York from exile in Italy and was not content with assuming a minor role in the organization.

== The conference begins ==
The Havana Conference convened on December 20, 1946. Delegates were present representing New York City, New Jersey, Buffalo, Chicago, New Orleans, and Florida. The largest delegation of bosses was from the New York-New Jersey area. Several major bosses from the Jewish Syndicate were at the conference to discuss joint La Cosa Nostra-Jewish Syndicate business. According to conference rules, the Jewish delegates could not vote on Cosa Nostra rules or policies; however, the Jewish crime bosses were allowed input on any joint business ventures, such as the Flamingo Hotel.

Luciano opened the Havana Conference by discussing a topic that would greatly affect his authority within the American Mafia; the position of capo di tutti capi ("boss of all bosses"). The last official boss of all bosses had been Salvatore Maranzano, who was murdered in September 1931. By the end of 1931, Luciano had eliminated this top position and re-organized the Italian mafia into "Cosa Nostra", or "This Thing of Ours". A board of directors, commonly called the "Commission", had been formed to oversee criminal activities, control rules, and set policies. Cosa Nostra thus became the top criminal organization within the National Crime Syndicate.

Luciano could easily have declared himself as Maranzano's heir in 1932; instead, he decided to exercise control behind the scenes. This arrangement had worked until Vito Genovese's return from Italy. Officially, Genovese was now just a caporegime; however, he had made it clear that he intended to take control of the Luciano crime family. Since Luciano's deportation in 1946, Luciano ally Frank Costello had been the acting boss of the Luciano family. As a result, tensions between the Costello and Genovese factions had started to fester. Luciano had no intention of stepping down as family boss; he had to do something about Genovese. Luciano also realized that Genovese threatened his overall authority and influence within the American mafia, probably with support from other crime bosses. Therefore, Luciano decided to resurrect the boss of all bosses position and claim it for himself. He hoped the other bosses would support him, either by officially affirming the title or at least by acknowledging that he was still "First Amongst Equals".

At the conference, Luciano allegedly presented the motion to retain his position as the top boss in La Cosa Nostra. Then Luciano ally, Albert "The Mad Hatter" Anastasia seconded the motion. Anastasia voted with Luciano because he felt threatened by Genovese's attempts to muscle in on his waterfront rackets. Checkmated by the Luciano-Costello-Anastasia alliance, Genovese was forced to swallow his ambitions and plan for the future. To further embarrass Genovese, Luciano encouraged Anastasia and Genovese to settle their differences and shake hands in front of the other bosses. This symbolic gesture was meant to prevent another bloody gang war such as the Castellammarese War of 1930–1931. With Luciano solidifying his personal position and squashing Genovese's ambition for now, Luciano brought up discussion of the mob's narcotics operations in the United States.

== Narcotics trade ==
One of the key topics at the Havana Convention was the global narcotics trade and the mob's operations in the United States. A longstanding myth has been the supposed refusal of Luciano and Cosa Nostra to deal in narcotics. In reality, only a few bosses such as Frank Costello and the other bosses who controlled lucrative gambling empires opposed narcotics. The anti-drug faction believed that Cosa Nostra did not need narcotics profits, that narcotics brought unwanted law enforcement and media attention, and that the general public considered it to be a very harmful activity (unlike gambling). The pro-drug faction said that narcotics were far more profitable than any other illegal activity. Furthermore, if Cosa Nostra ignored the drug trade, other criminal organizations would jump in and eventually diminish Cosa Nostra's power and influence.

Luciano himself had a long involvement in the drug trade, starting as a small time street dealer in the late 1910s. In 1928, after the murder of Arnold "The Big Bankroll" Rothstein, Luciano and Louis "Lepke" Buchalter took over Rothstein's large drug importation operation. Since the 1920s, Cosa Nostra had been involved in drug importation (heroin, cocaine, and marijuana) into North America. In the 1930s, the organization started transporting narcotics from the East Asia Golden Triangle and South America to Cuba and into Florida. The American mob had a longtime association with the government of Cuba concerning gambling interests such as casinos along with their legitimate business investments on the Caribbean island. This put them in a position to use their political and underworld connections to make Cuba one of their narcotics importation layovers or smuggling points where the drugs could be stored. They were then placed on sea vessels before they continued on to Canada and the United States via Montreal and Florida among the ports used by Luciano's associates.

With Luciano's deportation to Italy, he had the opportunity to import heroin from North Africa via Italy and Cuba into the US and Canada. Luciano made connections with Sicily's biggest bosses such as Don Calogero "Calo" Vizzini of Villalba who assisted the Allies' invasion of Sicily and had the greatest political connections of all the Sicilian bosses. Also, Don Pasquale Ania, a powerful boss in Palermo who had connections to legitimate pharmaceutical companies because large-scale heroin manufacturing in Italy was legal at the time.

During the Havana Conference, Luciano detailed the proposed drugs network to the bosses. After arriving in Cuba from North Africa, the mob would ship the narcotics to US ports that it controlled, primarily New York City, New Orleans, and Tampa. The narcotics shipped to the New York docks would be overseen by the Luciano crime family (later the Genovese) and the Mangano crime family (later the Gambino). In New Orleans, the operation would be overseen by the Marcello crime family, led by Carlos "Little Man" Marcello. In Tampa, the narcotics shipments would be overseen by the Trafficante crime family led by Santo Trafficante, Jr. The Havana Convention delegates voted to approve the plan.

Luciano built a massive drug organization spanning Italy and America. One of Luciano's narcotics lieutenants in Siculiana, Sicily was his old associate from New York, Nicola "Zu Cola" Gentile who oversaw all drug operations in the Agrigento province for Lucky Luciano and his partner Don Giuseppe Settecasi, the capo-provincial of Agrigento. A top Luciano lieutenant in the "Caneba Network" of mainland Italy was Antonio Farina, who would ship the narcotics to their U.S. partners in New York's Mangano crime family including Albert Anastasia, Frank "Don Cheech" Scalise, Jack Scarpulla, Peter Beddia and Matthew "Matty" Cuomo.

Long time Luciano ally Frank "Fingers" Coppola ran the Sicilian "Partinico Clan". This was a satellite group affiliated with the Detroit Partnership or Zerilli crime family led by boss Joseph "Joe Z." Zerilli and fellow bosses and Detroit allies, John "Papa John" Priziola, Angelo Meli, and Rafaelle Quasarano. The Detroit crime family then shipped the narcotics to their New York contacts, Giovanni "Big John" Ormento, of the Lucchese crime family, Carmine "Lilo" Galante and Natale "Joe Diamonds" Evola of the Bonanno crime family, Frank "Cheech" Livorsi of the Luciano crime family, and Joseph "Joe Bandy" Biondo of the Mangano crime family. These East Coast contacts would then distribute the drugs all along the East Coast.

Other Luciano lieutenants working mainland Italy included American deportees, Frank Barone and Giuseppe Arena in Rome, Frank Pirico, Frank Saverino and Giovanni Maugeri in Milan, Salvatore DiBella in Naples, and former Mangano crime family soldier, Joseph "Joe Peachy" Pici in Milan and Genoa. Other U.S. distribution groups that worked with Luciano and his allies were "The Bellanca Gang", brothers Antonio, Joseph, and Sebastiano "Benny Blanca" Bellanca and Gaetano "Tommy" Martino of the Mangano crime family. Then there was the group of Settimo "Big Sam" Accardi, Joseph "Hoboken Joe" Stassi and his brothers James "Jake" and Anthony, Anthony Granza, Vincent Ferrara and Louis Cirillo who worked for Albert "The Mad Hatter" Anastasia and Carlo "Carl" Gambino. Even with all the growing animosity Lucky Luciano couldn't leave out his old associate, Vito "Don Vito" Genovese who had his group of distributors including Anthony "Tony Bender" Strollo, Vincent "Vinnie Bruno" Mauro, Frank "The Bug" Caruso, Salvatore "Sam" Maneri, Vincent "Chin" Gigante and even Joseph "Joe Cago" Valachi who were all associated with the "Papalia-Agueci Network" of the Magaddino crime family of Buffalo and led by members Johnny "Pops" Papalia and Alberto Agueci of Hamilton and Toronto, Ontario.

At first the Mafia's operation was one of many individual operations connected or affiliated to the French-Corsican Mob or Unione Corse's famous "French Connection" heroin distribution ring. By the late 1950s the Sicilians and Americans organized a joint U.S. and Sicilian La Cosa Nostra narcotics operation that would eventually grow into one of the largest global narcotics operations ever. This famous joint U.S.-Sicilian operation came to be known as the Pizza Connection and was cemented between the two mafia organizations at the famous mafia summit held at the Grand Hotel des Palmes in Palermo, Sicily in October, 1957.

Salvatore and Ugo Caneba assisted Luciano and were the overseers of the famous heroin operation they controlled from mainland Italy to the United States, the Caneba Network which supplied high grade pharmaceutical quality heroin. Luciano's narcotics network was big and complex and he had many of his old, deported former U.S. allies to help him run his empire throughout the late 1940s. The main drug imported by Luciano's network at the time was heroin and the main sources were French underworld clans that made up the core of the Unione Corse Syndicate, or French Mob. The Corsican Clan was headed by powerful bosses Antoine D'Agostino, Jean Baptiste Croce, and Paul Mondolini, while the Marseilles Clan was made up of four groups. These four powerful groups included brothers Antoine and Barthelemy "Meme" Guerini, brothers Dominique and Jean Venturi, brothers Marcel, Xavier and Jean Francisci, and Joseph Orsini. Auguste Joseph Ricord was another boss that became part of the Unione Corse in the 1960s-70s. These two clans ruled the French underworld from the late 1940s to the late 1960s, supplying Luciano and his mafia allies with large amounts of heroin until the heroin ring known as the French Connection started to crumble in 1972 with the arrest of one of its biggest bosses, Auguste Joseph Ricord.

The Luciano narcotics empire continued to grow and prosper with the help of his U.S. associates. Many of Luciano's partners in the narcotics empire were Havana Conference delegates such as Joseph "The Old Man" Profaci who was once the biggest importer of olive oil and tomato paste in the United States and quietly used his food importation business to smuggle narcotics for decades, Gaetano "Tommy Brown" Lucchese, a longtime Luciano ally from their days as children in the streets of New York and who, along with his Lucchese crime family's narcotics distribution arm, the 107th St. Crew, which controlled all heroin distribution in Harlem, New York. Without a doubt one of the architects of the American heroin network and a partner of Luciano is well known and powerful New York mafia boss, Joseph "Joe Bananas" Bonanno, the patriarch of the Bonanno crime family, who along with the assistance of his cousin, Buffalo crime family boss Stefano "The Undertaker" Magaddino led the American mafia's expansion into Canada. Bonanno's and Magaddino's crime families in New York and Buffalo opened up Montreal and Toronto in the 1950s as satellite groups or individual operations connected with the famous French Connection, but eventually the satellite groups would grow into their own powerful crime families and control massive narcotics distribution networks that still operate even today, all of the narcotics networks mentioned help destroy the myth that Charlie Luciano and La Cosa Nostra were against narcotics. When Cuban president Fulgencio Batista y Zaldivar was eventually overthrown by Fidel Castro in 1959, the mob had to look elsewhere for a landing and storage facility for their narcotics shipments.

== The Siegel Situation ==
The next item on the agenda at the Havana Conference was what Lansky called the "Siegel Situation". In the mid-1930s, the New York and Chicago crime families had been sent west to establish and oversee a race wire service, gambling activities in Los Angeles and Nevada, and supervise narcotics shipments from Mexico. In a short while, Benjamin "Bugsy" Siegel had become a popular and visible figure in Hollywood's most glamorous circles.

The Flamingo Hotel was the creation of Billy Wilkerson, a Hollywood nightclub owner and one of the founders of The Hollywood Reporter. By the mid-1940s, it was still unfinished. This Flamingo Hotel project became Siegel's obsession. Siegel persuaded his longtime friend and business associate Meyer Lansky to help him sell New York and Chicago crime bosses on investing in this project. Siegel promised the bosses that the hotel and casino would be a smart and profitable investment.

The Flamingo project immediately ran into problems. Siegel appointed his girlfriend Virginia Hill as a project overseer. As a result, contractors were stealing from Siegel. They would sell him materials one day, then steal them from the building site at night, then resell them to him the next day. The Flamingo project was also impacted by the rising cost of materials and labor from the post World War II building boom. The bottom line was that a project projected to cost $1.5 million would eventually reach $6 million.

To make matters worse, the bosses suspected Siegel and Hill of stealing project money. Lansky and the bosses had discovered that Hill was taking frequent trips to Zürich, Switzerland and depositing money in a bank account. They suspected that Siegel was skimming money and might flee the country if the Flamingo failed.

Following a discussion, the delegates voted to execute Siegel. The delegates assigned Chicago Outfit consigliere, Charles "Trigger Happy" Fischetti to oversee the contract. The actual hit would be given to Jack Dragna, the Los Angeles crime family boss. Dragna, who despised Siegel, then gave the contract to Mob hitman, John "Frankie" Carbo, a Lucchese crime family soldier.

At the last moment Siegel got a reprieve. The partly completed Flamingo was scheduled to open December 26. Longtime Siegel friend Lansky convinced the delegates to see how the hotel did in its opening. The delegates agreed, and then took a break for Christmas Day. The delegates soon learned that the Flamingo opening night was a flop. The enraged mobsters demanded Siegel's head. Lansky again convinced them to wait. He argued that Siegel could still save the casino and make money.

After two weeks, the Flamingo closed to resume construction. The completed hotel opened a few months later. The Flamingo started making a small profit, but the Mafia investors had finally lost patience with Siegel. On June 20, 1947, Siegel was home alone at Hill's mansion in Los Angeles reading a newspaper by a living room window. A gunman with a military M-1 carbine rose up from the bushes and fired four shots into the room. Siegel was hit twice in the head and twice in the torso and died instantly.

== Lucky and Don Vito ==
At the end of the Havana Conference, the tension between Luciano and Genovese allegedly reached a boiling point, according to The Last Testament of Lucky Luciano, by Martin Gosch and Richard Hammer.

Meeting with Luciano in his room at the Hotel Nacional, Genovese told him that the U.S. government knew that Luciano was in Cuba and was pressuring the Cuban Government to expel him. Since Luciano was going to have to return to Italy, he should turn over leadership of the Luciano Family to Genovese and retire.

Positive that Genovese had tipped off the US government to his presence in Cuba, Luciano finally snapped. He proceeded to beat Genovese and eventually broke three of his ribs; it was three days before Vito could travel again. When Genovese felt better, Luciano and Anastasia put him on a plane to the States. Luciano also threatened to kill Genovese if he ever mentioned this incident to anyone.

In February 1947, the New York City papers got wind of the fact that Luciano was in Cuba. U.S. drug agent Harry Anslinger (called "that S.O.B Asslinger" by Luciano) demanded that Cuba deport Luciano to Italy. Anslinger claimed that Luciano was behind the recent surge of heroin into the United States. When Cuba refused to comply, Anslinger took his case to President Harry S. Truman. The U.S. government then halted all shipments of medical supplies to Cuba while Luciano was still on the island. Later in February, the Cubans caved in; they arrested Luciano and sent him back to Italy. When his plane landed there, the Italians arrested Luciano, but released him soon after.

Lucky Luciano died on January 26, 1962, of a heart attack at the Naples, Italy airport while picking up movie producer Martin Gosch.

Martin Gosch had helped Luciano write an autobiographical screenplay, but the Mafia Commission wouldn't allow the film to be made. Gosch along with Richard Hammer used the screenplay to write the book The Last Testament of Lucky Luciano in 1975.

Luciano's longtime associate and eventual nemesis, Vito Genovese, died a natural death in the Atlanta Federal Penitentiary in 1969. Luciano and Genovese are buried 100 feet from each other in the same cemetery in New York.

== Havana Conference attendees ==
List of the organized crime figures who attended the Havana Conference on December 20, 1946 at the Hotel Nacional in Havana, Cuba.

=== Hosts ===
- Charlie "Lucky" Luciano, former Luciano family boss, former chairman, founder and member of the Commission. Luciano was living in Naples, Italy. After the meeting he was named United States’ boss of bosses.
- Meyer "The Little Man" Lansky, Jewish Syndicate boss, a top financial and gambling operations advisor for the Italian mafia in America and casino operations front man (Las Vegas, Cuba, Bahamas).

=== New York-New Jersey delegation ===
- Frank "The Prime Minister" Costello, Luciano family boss, Commission member.
- Gaurino "Willie Moore" Moretti, Luciano family underboss.
- Salvatore “The Pope” Pellegrino, Luciano family consigliere and future front boss.
- Vito "Don Vito" Genovese, Luciano family caporegime and future boss.
- Giuseppe "Joe Adonis" Doto, Luciano family caporegime.
- Anthony "Little Augie Pisano" Carfano, Luciano family caporegime.
- Michele "Big Mike" Miranda, Luciano family caporegime and future consigliere.
- Albert "The Mad Hatter" Anastasia, Mangano family underboss and future boss.
- Joseph "Joe Bananas" Bonanno, Bonanno family boss, charter Commission member.
- Gaetano "Tommy Brown" Lucchese, Gagliano family underboss and future boss.
- Giuseppe "The Old Man" Profaci, Profaci family boss, charter Commission member.
- Giuseppe "Fat Joe" Magliocco, Profaci family underboss.

=== Chicago delegation ===
- Anthony "Joe Batters" Accardo, Chicago Outfit boss, Commission member.
- Charles "Trigger Happy" Fischetti, Chicago Outfit consigliere.
- Sam Giancana, Chicago Outfit front boss.

=== Buffalo delegation ===
- Stefano "The Undertaker" Magaddino, Buffalo family boss, charter Commission member.

=== New Orleans delegation ===
- Carlos "Little Man" Marcello, New Orleans family boss (some mob historians dispute his position at this time).

=== Tampa delegation ===
- Santo "Louie Santos" Trafficante Jr., Tampa family caporegime, moved to Havana in 1946 to oversee La Cosa Nostra and Tampa family casino and business interests, future Tampa family boss.

=== Jewish Syndicate delegation ===
- Abner "Longy" Zwillman, New Jersey Jewish Syndicate boss, National Syndicate Commission member.
- Morris "Moe" Dalitz, Cleveland Jewish Syndicate boss, casino front man (Desert Inn, Las Vegas)
- Joseph "Doc" Stacher, New Jersey Jewish Syndicate boss, casino front man (Sands Hotel, Las Vegas)
- Philip "Dandy Phil" Kastel, Jewish Syndicate boss, Frank Costello's Louisiana slots operations and Tropicana Casino, Las Vegas partner.

=== Entertainment ===
- Frank Sinatra

== Sidenote ==
While Luciano knew that Vito Genovese had tipped off the U.S. government to his whereabouts in Cuba, he did not live to learn that it was "Joe Bananas" Bonanno who revealed to New York City newspapers as to Luciano's whereabouts in Cuba in February 1947. Joseph Bonanno was a respected and feared Don, who was ruthless, ambitious and had aspired to being crowned capo di tutti capi (boss of all bosses) like his former boss and mentor Salvatore Maranzano. This information of Joseph Bonanno's treachery was picked up by former FBI agent William Roemer, who was given the information by several of his former FBI colleagues. Bill Roemer details this on pages 132-42 in his 1990 book, War of the Godfathers.

== In popular culture ==
The film The Godfather Part II has an homage to the Havana Conference when Michael Corleone travels to Havana to have a meeting with several other mob bosses. In the film a cake decorated with a picture of Cuba is cut into slices and handed out to the attendees, symbolizing the mafia takeover of the country.

Bugsy also has the climactic debate and decision on whether to and when to execute Bugsy Siegel set at the Hotel Nacional.

== See also ==
- Atlantic City Conference, 1929
- Grand Hotel et des Palmes Mafia meeting, 1957
- La Stella Restaurant meeting, 1966.
