= Frank Caracci =

Frank Caracci was an American mobster from New Orleans, Louisiana. He was associated with Carlos Marcello and the New Orleans crime family.

== Biography ==
Caracci was born in New Orleans, Louisiana, where he resided for the entirety of his life. He graduated from Samuel J. Peters High School. In New Orleans he operated a number of establishments. Caracci owned the bars The 500 Club on Bourbon Street and The Dungeon on Toulouse Street. In addition, the restaurant Court of the Two Sisters, located in the French Quarter, was under his ownership. Caracci was acquainted with Jack Ruby, later infamous for shooting Lee Harvey Oswald. He and Ruby were in telephone contact from the summer to the autumn of 1963, meeting at least one time.

In September 1967 Caracci testified before a Louisiana grand jury that had been set up by New Orleans District Attorney Jim Garrison to probe organized crime in the area. He stated that he knew nothing about organized crime and that the investigation was "off base". By at least 1969 he had ties to the Detroit Partnership in Michigan, having been observed in their company in the Detroit area. In 1970 he was convicted of bribing an Internal Revenue Service agent. He pled innocent but was convicted and sentenced to one year in prison along with being fined $10,000. In 1972 he was convicted for transporting pinball machines for the purpose of illegal gambling. He received two years in prison and a $10,000 fine. Following his release he continued his gambling operations. He also sought a pardon which was granted by Louisiana Governor Edwin Edwards in 1976. This was in spite of the objections of the New Orleans PD, who noted that Caracci "has been identified by federal, state and local authorities as an organized crime figure in the New Orleans area".

Caracci had involvement in the video poker machine industry. In 1990 he travelled to Las Vegas with Antoine Saacks, Deputy Chief for the New Orleans Police Department, on a business trip to scout locations for video poker machines in the city. Saacks was a friend of Caracci's son Mark, a lawyer who represented him in his civil suits. Later Saacks was suspended from the force for business dealings with a video poker company, a violation of departmental regulations. Under an April 1992 contract with the video poker company A.-Ace, Caracci received a commission of 25% from any profits made in the placement of video poker machines. Caracci earned $466,000 from this deal, as 90% of the A.-Ace machines were placed by Caracci. The Louisiana state police made an attempt to strip the company of its license because of this connection with Caracci. A.-Ace unsuccessfully fought the attempt and was stripped of its license in 1993.

He died in September 1996, aged 72, from heart disease at the Memorial Medical Center.
