= Phillip Kastel =

American mobster (1893–1962)

- Born: April 2, 1893; New York, New York, U.S.
- Died: August 16, 1962 (aged 69); New Orleans, Louisiana, U.S.
- Cause of death: Gun shot
- Occupation: Crime
- Spouse(s): Elsie Conner d.; Margaret Dennis
- Parent(s): Solomon Kastel and Rachel Rosenthal
- Relatives: Brother: Allen. Sisters: Florence, Ida and Rose Kastel

Phillip "Dandy Phil" Kastel (April 2, 1893 – August 16, 1962) was an American mobster, gambler, and longtime associate of both the Genovese and New Orleans crime family.

== Early life ==
Phillip Frank Kastel was born to a Jewish family on New York's Lower East Side to Solomon Kastel and Rachel Rosenthal on April 2, 1893. He was brother to Allen, Florence, Ida and Rose Kastel. He stood 5'7" and weighed 165 pounds. He married Elsie Conner in 1940 but they later divorced and he married Margaret Dennis. Despite growing up in a violent neighborhood frequented by street gangs and others of the city's underworld, Kastel instead became involved in gambling and confidence games during the early 1900s and held interests in many of the city's gambling dens shortly before Prohibition.

In 1917, upon the United States entry into World War I, Kastel fled to Canada in order to avoid the draft and operated a nightclub in Montreal, Quebec, for the remainder of the war. Returning to New York in 1919, Kastel was quickly arrested for extortion, although the charges were dismissed. Finding employment with Arnold Rothstein, Kastel oversaw Rothstein's numerous bucket shops, an early telemarketing scam selling fraudulent securities. He also preyed upon local chorus girls, specifically being charged with stealing $22,000 from chorus girl Betty Brown in 1922; however this charge was dismissed.

== From New York to New Orleans ==
Following Rothstein's death in 1928, Kastel went to work for former Rothstein associate and Luciano crime family acting boss Frank Costello and later moved to New Orleans to establish gambling operations, primarily slot machines, during the mid-1930s. Between 1935 and 1937, the Costello-Kastel partnership earned an income of over $2.4 million from slot machines alone, according to federal authorities. Although both were charged in 1939 for tax evasion, Kastel and Costello were both acquitted.

By the 1940s, with control over the majority of gambling in Louisiana, both legal and illegal, Kastel, Costello and the New Orleans crime family's acting boss Silvestro Carollo began to expand their operations into high class gambling casinos in New Orleans, which earned millions. It was during this period that Frank Costello was allegedly claimed to have committed his only act of violence when Kastel, in daily contact with the New York boss, reported his suspicions that one of the casino employees had been holding back money from the slot machine skimming operation. Costello was said to have replied he would handle the matter personally and, flying down to New Orleans, called for a sit-down between Kastel's entire organization and New Orleans crime family. Calling the accused employee forward, he was asked to explain the unusual shortages in his collections. As the employee was explaining, Costello was said to have reached under the podium and knocked the man unconscious with a monkey wrench. When he had regained consciousness, Costello told the man to return to his seat and told the audience that if anyone were caught trying to steal from the both crime families there would be worse treatment.

Kastel also attended the Havana Conference that began on December 20, 1946.

== Final years ==
Kastel continued to run the organization throughout the 1950s and, due to considerable financial contributions to local politicians (including $750,000 to the campaign fund of Governor Earl Long, the younger brother of former Governor Huey Long, from Kastel, Costello and Frankie Carbo in 1955), without interference from city officials.

However, as Costello was replaced by new acting boss Vito Genovese, Kastel was forced to hand over control of his illegal gambling operations in Louisiana to the New Orleans crime family and its new acting boss Carlos Marcello. In failing health, having lost his sight in one eye and worsening vision in the other, Kastel remained in his apartment at the Claiborne Towers in New Orleans until August 16, 1962, when he was found dead in his apartment from a gunshot wound to the head. His death was ruled a suicide.

== See also ==
- Sylvestro Carolla
