= Joseph Marcello =

American crime family underboss

Joseph Marcello was the underboss of the New Orleans crime family and the younger brother of its boss Carlos Marcello. When his brother was imprisoned he succeeded him as head of the family until 1990.

== Biography ==
Marcello was listed as the owner of the establishments Elmwood Plantation Restaurant and the Holiday Motel in Jefferson Parish, Louisiana. He was also a partner in Nola News with Joseph Poretto, and in the Southern News Company. In 1957 he attended the Apalachin meeting, a convocation of mafiosi from across the entirety of the United States. He arrived there with Mario Presta, Luciano family boss Frank Costello's man in New Orleans. When the meeting was stumbled upon by the police many were arrested but Marcello escaped. Marcello avoided arrest by staying inside the meeting house instead of fleeing like many others.

In 1966 he was present at another mafia gathering in La Stella Restaurant, New York that was raided by the police. This time however Marcello was caught. Marcello, his brother Carlos, Joe Colombo, Carlo Gambino, Santo Trafficante Jr. and seven others were arrested. They were charged with "consorting with known criminals", each had bail set at $100,000. The sum total of their bail, $1,300,000, was paid the next day by a bail bondsman with no collateral. They were subsequently released. Later, as a show of defiance, some of those arrested returned to La Stella for lunch in the days after their arrest. At this lunch were Trafficante, he and Carlos Marcello's lawyer Frank Ragano, Carlos Marcello's lawyer Jack Wasserman, Carolla, Gagliano and Joseph Marcello. In the presence of the media they joked "Why don't they arrest us again for eating here?". Ragano paid for the meal and explained that they were there "simply because it is the best restaurant in the neighbourhood, good food - no other reason".

In the 1970s and 1980s mafia boss Vincent LoScalzo attempted to deepen the already close ties between the New Orleans crime family and the Trafficante crime family. He was observed in the company of Marcello on numerous occasions. Marcello also knew Joe Campisi of the Dallas mafia. In the latter half of the 1970s the Marcellos were under heavy FBI investigation, with his brother Carlos being caught in a sting and sent to jail. One of the FBI agents investigating the Marcellos was having an affair with Marcello's wife Bootsie, who passed on information about Joseph and his family to the FBI.

On 30 June 1980 Marcello was subpoenaed by a grand jury in relation to the killing of judge John H. Wood Jr. in Texas. The jury was played a tape of Marcello talking about what he called a "third-hand rumor" that Lebanese brothers "had some thing to do with killing that judge in El Paso". Marcello claimed not to remember the conversation. On 21 April 1982, he was indicted for perjury before the grand jury, being released on bail set at $50,000. After his brother's imprisonment Marcello took over as boss of the family. In 1990, Anthony Carollo became boss of the organization after Marcello stepped down.

In 1991 video poker was legalized in Louisiana, as a result there was a surge of investment. Marcello got involved with the Worldwide Gaming company, owned by Bally Gaming, the profits of which he skimmed. In the end the company went bankrupt; Marcello, Anthony Carollo and Frank Gagliano were three of seventeen people indicted in the scheme. Marcello received a 33-month sentence and was ordered to pay $250,000 in restitution.

Marcello died of congestive heart failure at the age of 75, on June 12, 1999, in the Memorial Medical Center.
