= Anthony Carollo =

American mob boss (1923–2007)

- Born: Anthony Samuel Carollo; November 24, 1923; New Orleans, Louisiana, U.S.
- Died: February 1, 2007 (aged 83); Slidell, Louisiana, U.S.
- Resting place: Metairie Cemetery; New Orleans, Louisiana, U.S.
- Occupation: Crime boss
- Spouse: Mary Evans
- Children: 2
- Parent: Silvestro Carollo
- Allegiance: New Orleans crime family
- Conviction: Racketeering (1996)
- Criminal charges: Racketeering, Illegal gambling, conspiracy (1994)

Anthony Samuel Carollo (/kɑːˈrɔːloʊ/ kar-AW-loh, Italian: [kaˈrɔllo]; November 24, 1923 – February 1, 2007) was an American mobster, boss of the New Orleans crime family and son of the mob boss Silvestro Carollo. He led the organization from 1990 until his death on February 1, 2007.

== Early life ==
Carollo was born on November 24, 1923, in New Orleans, to Silvestro Carollo and Catherine Tenie Carollo. He had two siblings, Michael Carollo and Sarah Misuraca. At this time his father was the acting boss of the New Orleans Mafia, and he followed him in crime. He served in the U.S. Army during World War II and was owner of Venezia Restaurant in New Orleans.

Carollo married Mary Evans, and had one son, Sam Carollo and a step-son, Marlon Kenney.

== Rise to power ==
In September 1966, Carollo and other Mafia members attended a meeting at La Stella restaurant in Queens, New York. When the police raided the building, among those arrested were Carollo, Carlos Marcello, Santo Trafficante Jr., Joe Colombo, Carlo Gambino and others. He was freed on bail set at $100,000.

It has been alleged that this meeting was to resolve matters relating to the New Orleans crime family. The meeting was referred as "Little Apalachin".

== Boss and later years ==
When Carlos Marcello went to prison in 1983, his brother Joseph Marcello was the boss until 1990, when he stepped down. At some unknown point afterwards, Carollo, described as, "a portly restaurant owner", living in the New Orleans suburb of Slidell, Louisiana, became acting boss of the family.

According to FBI agent Rick McHenry, by the time the Bureau began investigating organized crime infiltration of the video poker industry in 1991, Carollo was the undisputed boss. Metairie resident Frank Gagliano, Sr., was the family's underboss.

Agent McHenry described Anthony Carollo as, "an old-style Mafia leader", saying, "He demands and commands respect, but in return treats others very fairly who are within the Family."

In May 1994, following an FBI sting dubbed "Operation Hard Crust", Carollo and 16 other persons belonging to the Marcello, Gambino and Genovese families were arrested on charges of infiltrating the newly legalized Louisiana video poker industry, racketeering, illegal gambling and conspiracy. In September 1995, Carollo pleaded guilty to a single count of racketeering conspiracy, with Frank and Joseph Gagliano and associates Felix Riggio III and Cade Carber. He was sentenced to 44 months in prison and ordered to pay in $500,000 in restitution.

Carollo died on February 1, 2007, at Northshore Regional Medical Center, Slidell, Louisiana, of natural causes. He is buried on Metairie Cemetery.

American Mafia
Preceded by Joseph Marcello Jr.	New Orleans crime family Boss; 1990–2007	Unknown
