= Frank Todaro =

Italian-American mob boss (1889–1944)

- Born: Francesco Todaro; July 15, 1889; San Cipirello, Sicily, Italy
- Died: November 29, 1944 (aged 55)
- Resting place: Metairie Cemetery; Metairie, Louisiana, U.S.
- Occupation: Mobster
- Spouse: Nancy Giamalva (m. 1914)
- Children: 4
- Relatives: Carlos Marcello (nephew by marriage)
- Allegiance: New Orleans crime family

Frank Todaro (/toʊˈdɑːroʊ/; born Francesco Todaro, Italian: [franˈtʃesko ˈtɔːdaro]; July 15, 1889 – November 29, 1944) was an Italian-American mobster, who was the boss of New Orleans crime family during 1944.

== Early life ==
Todaro was born in the area of San Cipirello, Province of Palermo, Sicily on July 15, 1889, to Giuseppe Todaro and Giuseppa DiMaggio. Todaro along with brothers Calogero "Charlie", Giuseppe "Joe", and Salvatore "Sam" Todaro immigrated to the United States in 1907 and settled in New Orleans, Louisiana, while his brother Angelo remained in Sicily.

Frank married Nancy Giamalva on July 14, 1914, in New Orleans, and they had four children together; two sons, Joseph and Clement Todaro, and two daughters, Jacqueline Leggio and Josephine Gallo.

== Career ==
Todaro was underboss of the New Orleans Mafia and succeeded Corrado Giacona as boss, after his death on July 25, 1944. He was boss for four months, until his death. Carlos Marcello, who became boss of the family in 1947, married his niece Jacqueline "Jackie" Todaro, the daughter of his brother Joseph. (Note: In Mafia Kingfish, by John H. Davis, has been erroneously reported that he was the father-in-law of Carlos Marcello.)

== Later life ==
Todaro died at his residence on S. Broad Street in New Orleans on November 29, 1944, from complications related to throat cancer. It has been speculated that Silvestro "Silver Dollar Sam" Carollo had a hand in his death with a little poison, but there is no concrete evidence to support this theory.

His funeral was held on December 1, 1944, the wake was conducted at Lamano-Panno-Fallo Funeral Home, a Roman Catholic Requiem Mass was held at St. Mary's Church and he was interred at Metairie Cemetery.

== Notes ==
American Mafia
Preceded by Vincenzo Moreci	New Orleans crime family Underboss; 19??–1944	Succeeded by Joseph Poretto
Preceded by Corrado Giacona	New Orleans crime family Boss; 1944	Succeeded by Silvestro Carollo
