= Frank Ragano =

American lawyer (1923–1998)

- Born: January 25, 1923; Ybor City, Florida, U.S.
- Died: May 13, 1998 (aged 75); Tampa, Florida, U.S.
- Occupation: Criminal defense lawyer
- Years active: 1952–1990

Frank Ragano (January 25, 1923 – May 13, 1998) was a self-styled "mob lawyer" from Florida, who made his name representing organized crime figures such as Santo Trafficante, Jr. and Carlos Marcello, and also served as lawyer for Teamsters leader Jimmy Hoffa. In his 1994 autobiography Mob Lawyer, Ragano recounted his career in defending members of organized crime, and made the controversial allegation that Florida mob boss Santo Trafficante, Jr. confessed to him shortly before he died in 1987 that he and Carlos Marcello had arranged for the assassination of President John F. Kennedy in 1963.

== Early life ==
Born in Ybor City, Tampa, Florida to Sicilian parents, Ragano attended Stetson Law School and clerked for the Florida Supreme Court before admission to the Florida Bar in 1952 and beginning his trial practice in Tampa, Florida. In 1954, he was recruited by another attorney to represent several defendants arrested in Tampa for involvement in Santo Trafficante, Jr.'s illegal bolita operations. He immediately befriended Trafficante, who thereafter welcomed him into the inner circles of Florida's organized crime scene.

Ragano became a frequent visitor to Trafficante's Havana nightclubs. During one such visit, Trafficante told Ragano that in 1957 he and others had set up then Senator John F. Kennedy in a Havana hotel room with several prostitutes, and that Trafficante rued the day he had failed to preserve the moment in secret surveillance tapes that could have been used for bribery purposes.

In 1959, after Fidel Castro overthrew the Fulgencio Batista regime in Cuba, Trafficante's casinos were closed down and he was imprisoned by the new government. Ragano worked on various attempts to free Trafficante, who was ultimately released in early 1960 and returned to the United States.

== Hoffa and Marcello ==
By 1960, Ragano was already known as a shrewd, up-and-coming criminal defense attorney, who defended a wide range of clients. Thanks to a recommendation from Santo Trafficante, Ragano was hired by Jimmy Hoffa to represent him on union corruption charges, thus beginning a long association with the infamous labor leader. He used his position with Hoffa to help place loans from the Teamsters' pension funds in return for "finder's fees." Liberace, the entertainer, was one such client who attempted to get a Teamsters' loan. Ragano witnessed millions of dollars of kickbacks to Hoffa from the Teamsters' pension fund.

In 1963, again on Trafficante's recommendation, Ragano began serving as attorney for Carlos Marcello, the head of the New Orleans crime family. In his book, Ragano claimed that Hoffa, who was being hounded by United States Attorney General Robert F. Kennedy on corruption and jury tampering charges, asked him to convey a message to Trafficante and Marcello that an assassination of President Kennedy should be arranged.

On 19 March 1963 Frank Chavez was indicted for obstruction of justice after he was caught handing out literature to grand jurors. At Hoffa's request, Ragano travelled to San Juan to represent him. Ragano asked for Chavez's trial, set for the 14th October, be delayed because he was representing Hoffa in Nashville on the same date. The plea was denied on the grounds that Ragano was not an attorney of record in Nashville and did not participate in the pretrial motions. Chavez got off on a mistrial when the jury failed to reach a verdict.

When Kennedy was shot and killed later that year, Ragano wrote that Hoffa always assumed that Trafficante and Marcello had actually carried out such a plan. Trafficante did "celebrate" with Ragano upon hearing word of Kennedy's assassination, but made no admission to Ragano at that time that he was in any way involved. He did tell Ragano later that the Central Intelligence Agency (CIA) had once asked him for help in assassinating Castro in Cuba.

Together with lawyer Percy Foreman, Ragano defended Wynell Sue Edwards when she was charged with shooting her husband. Edwards was acquitted in 1964 and the shooting was ruled accidental. In 1975, Ragano was asked by Trafficante to convey an urgent message to Hoffa to "be very careful and not take any chances." Within days, Hoffa disappeared under mysterious circumstances, never to be found.

== Later life ==
In 1966, while representing Trafficante in connection with an arrest of several top mobsters in New York City during the La Stella Restaurant meeting, Ragano was photographed having lunch with Trafficante, Marcello, and others, and was identified by Time magazine as a "top Cosa Nostra hoodlum." He later sued Time for libel and was represented by famed trial lawyer Melvin Belli. During the libel trial he was called "house counsel for the mob." He lost his suit. Belli had previously represented Jack Ruby, the man who killed Lee Harvey Oswald, the accused killer of Kennedy, and Ragano claimed that Trafficante warned him not to ask Belli any questions about Ruby.

In connection with an incident made famous in the Martin Scorsese film Goodfellas, Ragano helped represent four mobsters, including "Jimmy the Gent" Burke and Henry Hill, charged in 1972 with extortion in collecting a gambling debt in Tampa, Florida.

Ragano himself became the accused when he was charged with tax evasion in 1972. Although his conviction was reversed on appeal, he was later retried and convicted on related charges. As a result, he was suspended from the practice of law in 1976, and claims that Trafficante provided no support and abandoned him.

In 1978, Ragano testified before the House Select Committee on Assassinations, which was reinvestigating the John F. Kennedy assassination, and denied involvement in any JFK plots. In 1981, Ragano was reinstated as an attorney by The Florida Bar, and eventually made amends with Trafficante, whom he then represented in 1986 in a racketeering case also made famous in the film Donnie Brasco. Trafficante, who was also represented by others, was acquitted of all charges.

In 1990, Ragano was again convicted of tax evasion. In 1993, he served 10 months in prison. In 1995, the A&E Network aired an episode of American Justice devoted to his career as a "defender of the mob." On May 13, 1998, in Tampa, Frank Ragano died in his sleep. He was survived by his second wife (former mistress) and their two children, and his first wife and their three children.

== Mob Lawyer ==
In 1994, Ragano's autobiography Mob Lawyer was published by Charles Scribner's Sons. The book was co-written with Selwyn Raab, a reporter for The New York Times, and featured a foreword by Nicholas Pileggi. He was described by Frontline as "the first mob lawyer ever to go public with what he knows".

Kirkus Reviews described Mob Lawyer as a "riveting memoir of life inside the murderous world of Mafia chieftain Santo Trafficante and Teamster boss Jimmy Hoffa, by their personal lawyer" and an "insider's impossible-to-put-down account of life within the 'Honorable Society.'" In a review for ABA Journal, Martin Kimel called it an "intelligent memoir" and wrote: "Despite the seaminess of its cast of characters, Mob Lawyer is engrossing reading and an object lesson in lifestyles of the rich and infamous."

Publishers Weekly said: "The story, which profits from the smooth style of New York Times crime reporter Raab, has less impact as an account of a man who woke up too late than for its revelations about significant events of our time." Ronald Goldfarb reviewed the book for The Washington Post stating: "Ragano's biography of his career is full of naive rationalizations about the virtues of these men he cavorted with and represented..., and self-serving criticism of the government's Gestapo-like tactics, selective prosecution, use of spies as witnesses and intimidation of suspects' families." Goldfarb added, "Cynics will wonder whether Mob Lawyer is merely the latest entry in the books-by-crooks genre. Except for the shocking disclosures about his deceased former clients, there is no reason to read this book. With them, however, it joins a select few that provide critical links in the circumstantial case that the mob planned JFK’s killing."

== JFK assassination claims ==
On January 14, 1992, Ragano told Jack Newfield of the New York Post that he relayed a request from Hoffa to Trafficante and Marcello asking that the two Mafia bosses kill Kennedy. He repeated the claim two days later on ABC's Good Morning America, in Newfield's Frontline report entitled JFK, Hoffa and Mob broadcast in November 1992, and again in his 1994 autobiography Mob Lawyer.

According to Ragano, he met Hoffa at the Teamsters' headquarters in Washington D.C. then delivered the message to Trafficante and Marcello a few days later in a meeting at the Royal Orleans Hotel in New Orleans. He stated he was chosen by Hoffa because, as both Hoffa and Trafficante's lawyer, he could be assured of attorney–client privilege. Ragano said that Jim Garrison served as a patsy for the New Orleans mob by disseminating theories that served to distract attention from mafia figures who were involved in the plot.

Although Ragano believed he had received a few hints from both Trafficante and Marcello that they had somehow been involved in the Kennedy assassination, it was not until just before he died in 1987 that Trafficante, according to Ragano, made a direct confession to him. Ragano wrote that on March 13, 1987, a dying Trafficante (he died four days later) asked to meet him in Tampa for a hurried meeting. While riding in Ragano's car, Trafficante allegedly told Ragano in Sicilian: "Carlos e' futtutu. Non duvevamu ammazzari a Giovanni. Duvevamu ammazzari a Bobby," which Ragano translated as: "Carlos screwed up. We shouldn't have killed John. We should have killed Bobby." Ragano stated three witnesses could support his statement that he met Trafficante in Tampa. He refused to name them adding: "One guy is afraid of retaliation. The other guys are two doctors, who say they'll testify if they're summoned to court."

In his book Reclaiming History: the Assassination of President John F. Kennedy, Vincent Bugliosi has criticized Ragano's claims. Bugliosi argues that Trafficante was most likely not in Tampa on the day in question, but was rather in North Miami Beach receiving dialysis treatments. Bugliosi states that it is absurd to think that Marcello and Trafficante would get involved in plotting to assassinate a president, particularly as nothing more than a supposed favor to Jimmy Hoffa. He also stated that by allegedly conveying a message in 1963 to that effect, and by relating this confession from an alleged conspirator, Ragano would himself be admitting to having been a part of a murder conspiracy.

Shortly after the initial allegations, Jeffrey Hart compared Ragano's account with that presented in Oliver Stone's recently released film JFK. According to Hart, Ragano presented an "earthy motive, vastly more plausible than the movie theory." Hart quoted G. Robert Blakey as stating that he believed Ragano and that his testimony "would have strengthened the conclusions" of the HSCA. Hart also quoted Frank Mankiewicz, Robert F. Kennedy's press secretary, as finding Ragano's scenario as "the most plausible (assassination) theory".

When Ragano was questioned by the Assassination Records Review Board, created in 1992 to reexamine JFK conspiracy theories after the release of Stone's film, he claimed to have contemporaneous notes of his conversations regarding the JFK plot, but when they were produced, "he could not definitively state whether the notes were taken during the meetings [with mob figures]... or later when he was working on his book." His notes were subjected to Secret Service tests to determine when they were actually prepared, but the results were inconclusive.

== Billie Jean King-Bobby Riggs Allegations ==
In August, 2013, The Tampa Tribune newspaper and ESPN published allegations by a former employee of the Palma Ceia Country Club in Tampa, claiming that in 1973 an employee overheard Ragano, Trafficante and Marcello discussing plans by Bobby Riggs to throw the famed tennis match with female tennis star Billie Jean King. That year, Riggs and King held a nationally televised tennis match called "The Battle of the Sexes," in which King beat Riggs in three straight sets after Riggs had taunted female tennis players and had beaten Margaret Court. According to Hal Shaw, a former employee of the Palma Ceia Golf & Country Club (an exclusive private club near downtown Tampa, Florida), he overheard Ragano tell Trafficante and Marcello that Riggs owed over $100,000 to the mob, and that in exchange for throwing the match his debt would be absolved.

Selwyn Raab, who co-authored Mob Lawyer with Ragano, when told of these allegations, stated that no mention was ever made by Ragano about this in any of his notes or in the FBI files. "It's kind of a good story. I don't think (Ragano) would have excluded it."

Chris Ragano, a Tampa attorney and son of Frank Ragano from his second marriage to his mistress Nancy, responded to the allegations by stating that the Ragano family did not move to Tampa until 1979. That is clearly not true as the Frank Ragano's original family had been in the Tampa Bay area since the early 1950s and Frank was born in Tampa. In 1974, Frank Ragano was convicted on 5 separate tax fraud charges Further, Hal Shaw's recollection that he gave tennis lessons to Frank Ragano's wife was not confirmed by Mrs. Ragano, who has no recollection of any such lessons in Tampa. Trafficante and Marcello were not known to frequent the Palma Ceia Country Club, preferring meetings at Malio's Steakhouse in Tampa or La Tropicana Cafe in Ybor City to discuss mob business.

In 2016, Robert J. Cipriano obtained the film rights to Mob Lawyer from Ragano's wife Nancy and son Chris. Cipriano was introduced to Ragano by Thomas Lipscomb of the New York Times Book Review in early 1986, while Cipriano was producing film and televisions projects with Parkinson Friendly Productions in Los Angeles, California.

== Related Books ==
- Mob Lawyer (1994), Frank Ragano and Selwyn Raab, Charles Scribner's Sons, ISBN 0-684-19568-2
- Cigar City Mafia: A Complete History of the Tampa Underworld (2004), Scott M. Deitche, Barricade Books, ISBN 1-56980-266-1
- The Silent Don: The Criminal Underworld of Santo Trafficante, Jr. (2007), Scott Deitche, Barricade Books, ISBN 1-56980-322-6
