= Aldo Vera Serafin =

Cuban exile murdered in Puerto Rico in 1976

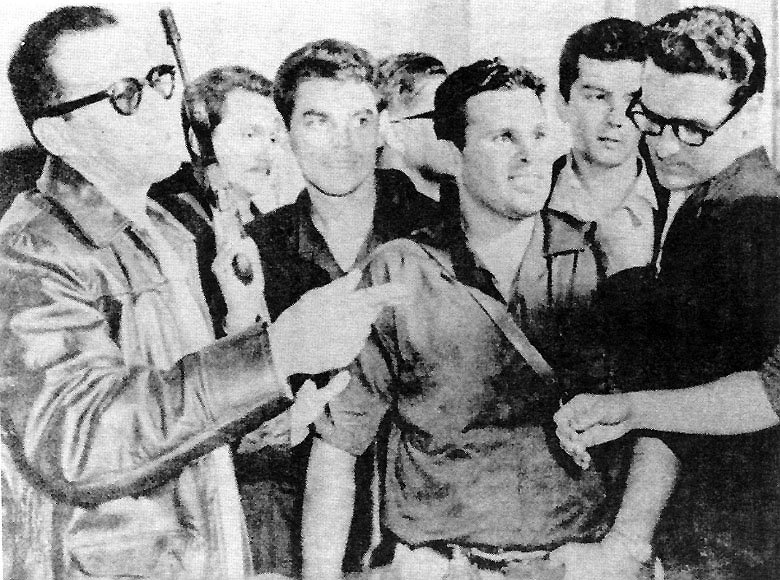
- Aldo Vera (third from the right), Armando Hart (second from the right) in Columbia in January 1959.
- Born: c. 1933; La Habana, Cuba
- Died: October 26, 1976 (aged 43); San Juan, Puerto Rico
- Cause of death: Gunshot wounds
- Known for: Victim of unsolved homicide

Aldo Vera Serafin (c. 1933 – October 26, 1976) was a Cuban exile who was once a top police official for Prime Minister Fidel Castro. He later split with Castro.

== Background ==
In 1958 he joined Castro's 26th of July Movement, engaging in sabotage work in Havana. In January 1959, he was named head of the technical investigations department, the main intelligence organ of the Cuban police. Vera became disenchanted with communism and fled Cuba in 1961. He formed the Movimiento Acciόn Patriόtica, which received financial backing from the mafia boss Santo Trafficante Jr.

On October 26, 1976, Vera was hit with two shots fired from an automobile in a suburb of San Juan, Puerto Rico, as he was stepping out of a bakery on the way to a meeting with members of an anti-Castro political group. Serafin died almost immediately. His death has never officially been solved.

== See also ==
- List of unsolved murders (1900–1979)
