= La Stella Restaurant =

Italian restaurant in Queens, NY

Coordinates: 40°43′34″N 73°51′04″W

La Stella Restaurant was an Italian restaurant in Forest Hills, Queens.

La Stella was opened by Joe and Jack Taliercio in 1960. It closed in 1992.

Tony Talierico later opened a location in Sunrise, Florida.

On the morning of June 2, 1970, a pipe bomb exploded outside the restaurant knocking in the front door, smashing in the front window and starting a small fire.

== Organized crime ==
On September 22, 1966, Queens County District Attorney Nat Hentel organized the arrest of 13 Mafia leaders. Those arrested included Carlo Gambino, Joseph Colombo, Carlos Marcello, Santo Trafficante Jr., Aniello Dellacroce, Michele Miranda and Anthony Carollo. It was called “Little Apalachin” after the 1957 arrests. Other reports say it happened on September 30 and 15 were arrested.

No-one was charged with any crimes but they were held as material witnesses on $100,000 bail each for a grand jury investigation which resulted in no indictments.
