= Silvestro Carollo =

Italian-American mob boss (1896–1970)

- Born: June 17, 1896; Terrasini, Sicily, Italy
- Died: June 26, 1970 (aged 74); New Orleans, Louisiana, U.S.
- Resting place: Metairie Cemetery; Metairie, Louisiana, U.S.
- Other names: Silver Dollar Sam; Sam Carollo
- Occupation: Crime boss
- Spouse: Catherine Tenie
- Children: 3, including Anthony Carollo
- Allegiance: New Orleans crime family
- Conviction: Murder (1932)
- Penalty: 2 years' imprisonment

Silvestro Carollo (Note: Also spelled Silvestro Carolla, Sylvestro Carollo and Sylvestro Carolla.) (/kɑːˈrɔːloʊ/, Italian: [silˈvɛstro kaˈrɔllo]; June 17, 1896 – June 26, 1970), nicknamed "Silver Dollar Sam", was an Italian-American mob boss, and boss of the New Orleans crime family. He transformed the New Orleans's Black Hand gang into a Cosa Nostra crime family, and acted as street boss from 1922 to 1944. He was the boss from 1944 until his deportation in 1947. In 1970, he came back to the United States, and died on June 26, 1970.

== Early years ==
Carollo was born on June 17, 1896, in Terrasini, Sicily, and immigrated to the United States in 1903 to join his parents in the French Quarter of New Orleans. By 1918, Carollo was a high-ranking member of the New Orleans Black Hand gang. Charles Matranga retired in 1922, leaving Corrado Giacona as boss and Carollo as street boss, taking over Matranga's minor bootlegging operations.

Carollo was married to Catherine Tenie Carollo and had three children, Anthony Carollo, Michael Carollo, and Sarah Misuraca. Carollo owned several businesses in the New Orleans area, including the St. Charles Tavern and a cafe in Terrasini.

== Height of power ==
As his power increased, Carollo gained considerable political influence in New Orleans. In February 1928, Al Capone's brother Ralph Capone tried to force Carollo to supply his brother's Chicago Outfit with imported alcohol and cut off Joe Aiello, a rival bootlegger in Chicago. Arriving by train in New Orleans with several Outfit mobsters to press his case, Capone's party was intercepted, according to local legend, by Carollo and several New Orleans policemen. Carollo's cops reportedly disarmed Capone's henchmen and then broke their fingers. Capone was allegedly forced to immediately board another train back to Chicago without any concessions from Carollo.

In 1930, Carollo was arrested for the near fatal shooting in the face of Federal Bureau of Narcotics agent Clarence Moore, while resisting arrest after an undercover drug buy.

Carollo was also arrested and indicted for ordering the December 1930 contract killing with a lupara of William Bailey, an ex-cop, deserter from the United States Army, and liquor hijacker with a very lengthy criminal record. Bailey, according to press reports, was both hated and distrusted in the New Orleans criminal underworld, as he was widely believed to be a criminal informant for the Federal Bureau of Prohibition. Before dying in hospital, Bailey identified his assailants as "Carollo's gang".

Despite testimony by several New Orleans policemen that Carollo was in New York City at the time of the shooting and wounding of Agent Moore, he was sentenced to two years in Federal prison. Charges related to the murder of William Bailey were never prosecuted by the Orleans Parish District Attorney's Office.

Released in 1934, Carollo negotiated a deal with Luciano crime family mobsters, Frank Costello and Phillip "Dandy Phil" Kastel, along with Louisiana Senator Huey Long, to bring illegal slot machines to New Orleans. The new mayor of New York, Fiorello La Guardia, had started attacking mob gambling establishments in that city, and Costello thought that New Orleans might be a safer environment for them. Therefore, it was arranged that Carollo and his lieutenant Carlos Marcello would run illegal gambling operations in New Orleans undisturbed for several years.

Giacona died on July 25, 1944, and was succeeded by his underboss Frank Todaro; however he died of natural causes in November of that year, and Carollo became leader of the family. It has been speculated that he had a hand in Todaro's death with a little poison, but there is no concrete evidence to support this theory.

== Deportation and later years ==
In 1938, another narcotics arrest would signal the decline of Carollo's fortunes. In 1940, after Carollo had served two years in the Atlanta Federal Penitentiary, a Federal court ordered him deported to Italy. However, in 1941, this order was delayed indefinitely when Fascist Italy declared war on the United States. Throughout World War II, Carollo was able to continue running the New Orleans crime family. At the end of the war, Louisiana Congressman James H. Morrison proposed a special bill in the U.S. House of Representatives making Carollo a naturalized citizen. If this bill had passed, it would have nullified the original 1940 deportation order. However, Washington, D.C., investigative journalist Drew Pearson exposed this deal, and the bill never passed Congress. In April 1947, seven years after the original order was issued, Carollo was finally deported. At this time, control of the family passed to Carlos Marcello.

Arriving in Sicily, Carollo organized an alleged partnership with fellow exile Charles "Lucky" Luciano, establishing criminal enterprises in Mexico. In 1949, Carollo returned to the United States, but was deported again in 1950. In 1952, Carollo was arrested in Italy for swindling and narcotics trafficking. In 1970, after living in Palermo, Sicily for 20 years, Carollo once again illegally returned to the United States. According to Life Magazine, Marcello had asked Carollo to come home to mediate disputes within the New Orleans family. Despite another deportation attempt, Carollo continued to live in the United States until his death on June 26, 1970. He lies buried in Metairie Cemetery.

His son Anthony Carollo remained active in the New Orleans crime family for many years. At the time of his arrest and conviction in the Federal Bureau of Investigation's "Operation Hardcrust" sting related to mob infiltration of the video poker industry in the mid-1990s, Anthony Carollo had become the boss of the family.

== Notes ==
American Mafia
Preceded by Charles Matranga	New Orleans crime family Co-Boss with Corrado Giacona; 1922–1944	Succeeded by Frank Todaro
Preceded by Frank Todaro	New Orleans crime family Boss; 1944–1947	Succeeded by Carlos Marcello
