= New Orleans crime family =

Italian-American organized crime group

- Founded: c. 1860s
- Founder: Silvestro Carollo
- Founding location: New Orleans, Louisiana, United States
- Years active: c. 1860s–2000s
- Territory: Primarily the New Orleans metropolitan area, with additional territory throughout Louisiana, Mississippi and Texas, as well as Las Vegas and Havana
- Ethnicity: Italians as "made men" and other ethnicities as associates
- Membership (est.): 4–5 made members and 100+ associates (1980s)
- Activities: Racketeering, gambling, loansharking, extortion, corruption, narcotics trafficking, cigarette smuggling, arms trafficking, fencing, money laundering, prostitution, assault, and murder
- Allies: Buffalo crime family; Chicago Outfit; Cleveland crime family; Dallas crime family; Gambino crime family; Genovese crime family; Kansas City crime family; Los Angeles crime family; Philadelphia crime family; Trafficante crime family; Dixie Mafia; Outlaws MC
- Rivals: Various gangs in the New Orleans area

The New Orleans crime family, also known as the Marcello crime family or the New Orleans Mafia, is an Italian American Mafia crime family based in New Orleans, Louisiana. The family has a history of criminal activity dating back to the late 19th century. These activities included racketeering, extortion, gambling, prostitution, narcotics distribution, money laundering, loan sharking, fencing of stolen goods, and murder. Operating along the Gulf Coast, with its main criminal activity centered in the New Orleans area, the organization reached its height of influence under bosses Silvestro Carollo and Carlos Marcello.

A series of setbacks during the 1980s, including the imprisonment of Marcello, reduced the family's influence, and law enforcement dismantled most of what remained of the organization shortly after Marcello's death in 1993. Despite the family's apparent downfall, it is believed that at least some elements of the American Mafia remain active in New Orleans today.

== History ==
=== Background ===
The Sicilian organized crime in New Orleans originated in the form of small gangs active in the area in the 1860s. The gangs were divided and named according the cities of origin of the criminals, which were Palermo, Messina and Trapani. These gangs were far from being a single entity; on the contrary, they were divided and often fought among themselves.

The "Palermo's gang" was headed by Raffaele Agnello, who was murdered in 1869 during a feud against an alliance made by his enemies of the Messina and Trapani gangs. The leadership of the gang then passed to his brother Joseph Agnello, who was also murdered in 1872. His death marked the end of the gang war in New Orleans that started in 1868, following the murder of Litero Barba, head of the Messina's gang. During that period, mafiosi originating in Palermo were briefly eclipsed by underworld factions transplanted from Trapani and Messina.

Another notorious individual of those years was Joseph P. Macheca, a produce importer and steamship line owner allied with Louisiana conservative Democratic interests, and considered by many as one of the first Mafia members in the US. Macheca was one of many suspects accused of the murder of New Orleans police chief David Hennessy, and after being acquitted at trial, Macheca and ten others were lynched by an enraged crowd in 1891.

=== Early history ===
The Matranga crime family, established by Charles (1857 – October 28, 1943) and Antonio (Tony) Matranga (d. 1890), was one of the earliest recorded American Mafia crime families, operating in New Orleans during the late 19th century until the beginning of Prohibition in 1920. Silverstro "Silver Dollar Sam" Carollo, Carlos "the Little Man" Marcello, and Anthony Carollo were the main men associated with the New Orleans Mafia during the peak of their criminal activities.

Born of Arbëreshë descent and members of the Italo-Albanian Catholic Church in Piana degli Albanesi, Sicily, Carlo and Antonio Matranga immigrated to New Orleans during the 1870s and eventually opened a saloon and brothel. Using their business as a base of operations, the Matranga brothers began establishing lucrative organized criminal activities including extortion and labor racketeering. Once the Matranga brothers began to put down roots and begin their organized criminal activities, they began receiving tribute payments from Italian laborers and dockworkers, as well as from the Provenzano family. They eventually began moving in on Provenzano fruit loading operations intimidating them with threats of violence.

Although the Provenzanos withdrew in favor of giving the Matrangas a cut of waterfront racketeering, by the late 1880s, the two families eventually went to war over the grocery and produce businesses held by the Provenzanos. As both sides began employing a large number of Sicilian mafiosi from their native Monreale, Sicily, the violent gang war began attracting police attention, particularly from New Orleans police chief David Hennessy who began investigating the warring organizations.

The murder of Hennessey created a huge backlash from the city and, although Charles and several members of the Matrangas were arrested, they were eventually tried and acquitted in February 1891 with Charles Matranga and a 14-year-old member acquitted midway through the trial as well as four more who were eventually acquitted and three others released in hung juries. The decision caused strong protests from residents, angered by the controversy surrounding the case, and the following month a lynch mob stormed the jail killing 11 of the 19 defendants—five of whom had not been tried—on March 14, 1891.

Matranga was able to escape from the vigilante lynchings and, upon returning to New Orleans, resumed his position as head of the New Orleans crime family eventually forcing the declining Provenzanos out of New Orleans by the end of the decade. Because of the Hennessy lynchings, the American Mafia agreed that law enforcement officials should not be harmed in their crossfire. Matranga would rule over the New Orleans underworld until shortly after Prohibition when he turned over leadership over to Carollo in the early 1920s.

=== Silver Dollar Sam ===
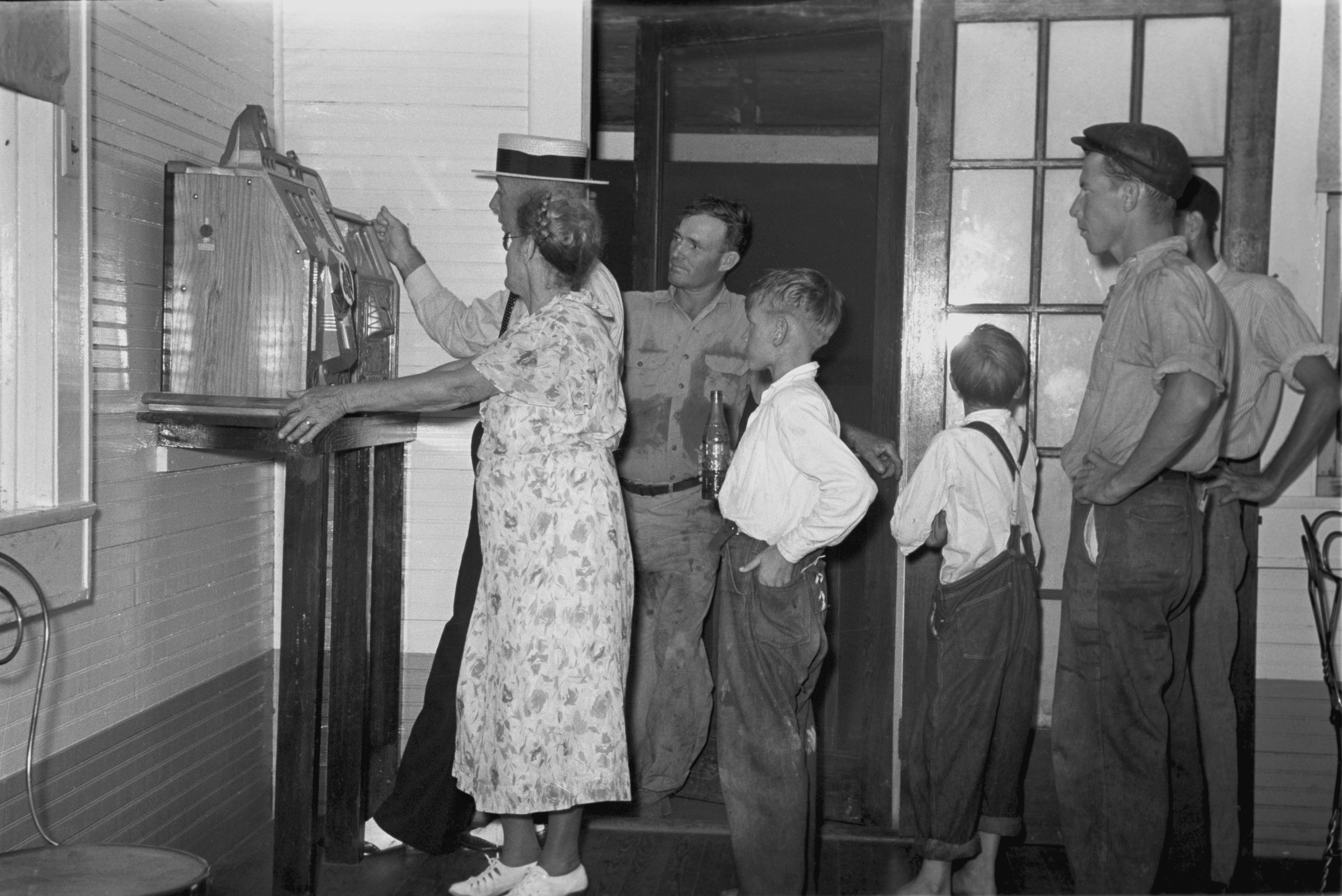
Slot machines were installed in towns throughout Louisiana, generating a dependable stream of revenue for the "family".

Carollo led the New Orleans crime family transforming predecessor Charles Matranga's Black Hand gang into a modern organized crime group.

Born in 1896 in Sicily, Carollo immigrated to the United States with his parents in 1904. By 1918, Carollo had become a high-ranking member of Matranga's organization, eventually succeeding him following Matranga's retirement in 1922. Assuming control of Matranga's minor bootlegging operations, Carollo waged war against rival bootlegging gangs, gaining full control following the murder of William Bailey in December 1930.

Gaining considerable political influence within New Orleans, Carollo is said to have used his connections when, in 1929, Al Capone supposedly traveled to the city demanding Carollo supply the Chicago Outfit (rather than Chicago's Sicilian Mafia boss Joe Aiello) with imported alcohol. Meeting Capone as he arrived at a New Orleans train station, Carollo, accompanied by several police officers, reportedly disarmed Capone's bodyguards and broke their fingers, forcing Capone to return to Chicago.

In 1930, Carollo was arrested for the shooting of federal narcotics agent Cecil Moore, which took place during an undercover drug buy. Despite support by several New Orleans police officers who testified Carollo was in New York at the time of the murder, he was sentenced to two years.

Released in 1934, Carollo negotiated a deal with New York mobsters Frank Costello and Phillip "Dandy Phil" Kastel, as well as Louisiana Senator Huey Long, to bring slot machines into Louisiana, following New York Mayor Fiorello LaGuardia's attacks on organized crime. Carollo, with lieutenant Carlos Marcello, would run illegal gambling operations undisturbed for several years.

Carollo's legal problems continued as he was scheduled to be deported in 1940, after serving two years in Atlanta Federal Penitentiary, following his arrest on a narcotics charge in 1938. His deportation was delayed following the U.S. entry into World War II, and Carollo would continue to control the New Orleans crime family for several years before a campaign, begun by reporter Drew Pearson, exposed an attempt by Congressman James H. Morrison to pass a bill awarding Carollo with American citizenship (thereby making deportation illegal). Carollo would be deported in April 1947.

Soon after returning to Sicily, Carollo organized a partnership with fellow exile Charles "Lucky" Luciano, establishing criminal enterprises in Mexico. Briefly returning to the United States in 1949, he was deported the following year as control of the New Orleans crime family reverted to Carlos Marcello. Living in Palermo, Sicily until 1970, Carollo once again returned to the US. According to Life Magazine, he was asked to return by Marcello, who needed him to mediate disputes within the New Orleans Mafia. After a subsequent attempt to deport him failed, he died a free man from a heart condition in 1970.

=== Carlos Marcello ===
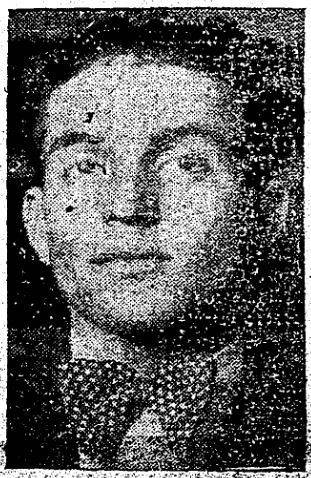
Carlos Marcello in 1929

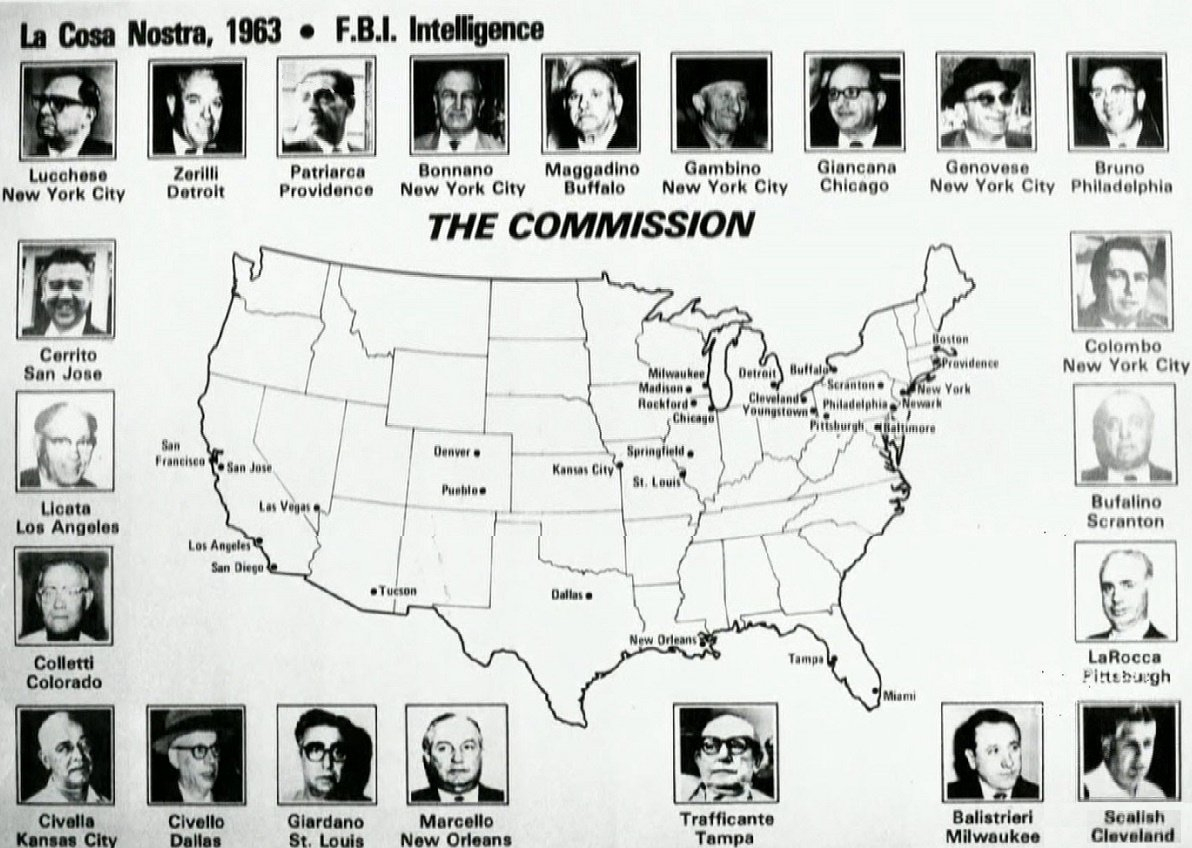
FBI's 1963 La Cosa Nostra Commission chart

Carlos Marcello was born February 6, 1910, to Sicilian immigrants in Tunis, French Tunisia. He immigrated to the United States in 1911 and settled in Jefferson Parish, a suburb of New Orleans. As a young child and teenager, Marcello often committed petty crimes in the French Quarter. When he was 28 years old in 1938, Marcello was arrested and fined $76,830 for selling 23 pounds (about 10 kilograms) of marijuana. He faced a lengthy prison sentence but only served 10 months because of the deal he made with Governor Huey Long. This ordeal got him involved with Frank Costello, leader of the Genovese crime family in New York City, where he began working for Costello.

By the end of 1947, Marcello had taken control of Louisiana's illegal gambling network. He had also joined forces with New York mob associate Meyer Lansky in order to take money from some of the most important casinos in the New Orleans area. According to former members of the Chicago Outfit, Marcello was also assigned a cut of the money skimmed from Las Vegas casinos, in exchange for providing "muscle" in Florida real estate deals. By this time, Marcello had been selected as "The Godfather" of the New Orleans Mafia, by the family's capos and the National Crime Syndicate after the deportation of Sam Carollo to Sicily. He held this position for the next 30 years.

On January 25, 1951, Marcello appeared before the U.S. Senate's Kefauver Committee for organized crime. Robert F. Kennedy served as the chief counsel to the committee with his brother, Senator John F. Kennedy. Marcello pleaded the Fifth Amendment 152 times. The Committee called Marcello "one of the worst criminals in the country."

When John F. Kennedy became president, he appointed his brother Robert Kennedy as U.S. Attorney General. With these titles, the two men worked to have Marcello deported to Guatemala which was the fake birthplace Marcello had claimed. On April 4, 1961, the U.S. Justice Department, under Attorney General Robert F. Kennedy, apprehended Marcello as he made what he assumed was a routine visit to the immigration authorities in New Orleans, then deported him to Guatemala. He struggled to make it back to New Orleans and sustained many injuries on his way back; however, two months later, he was back in New Orleans. Thus, he successfully fought efforts by the government to deport him.

In November 1963, Marcello was tried for "conspiracy to defraud the United States government by obtaining a false Guatemalan birth certificate" and "conspiracy to obstruct the United States government in the exercise of its right to deport Carlos Marcello." He was acquitted later that month on both charges. However, in October 1964, Marcello was charged with "conspiring to obstruct justice by fixing a juror [Rudolph Heitler] and seeking the murder of a government witness [Carl Noll]". Marcello's attorney admitted Heitler had been bribed but said that there was no evidence to connect the bribe with Marcello. Noll refused to testify against Marcello in the case. Marcello was acquitted of both charges.

In September 1966, Marcello was summoned to La Stella restaurant in Queens, New York to defend himself at a secret trial for the Mafia. At this meeting, which came to be known as "Little Apalachin", police raided the restaurant, arresting Marcello and twelve other senior mafiosi, including the "Judge" of the meeting Cosa Nostra Commissioner Carlo Gambino, with charges of "consorting with known criminals." Before the raid took place, however, Marcello successfully defended himself and won his "case." When Marcello arrived at New Orleans Airport after being released on bail, he greeted FBI agents and reporters with the phrase, "I am the boss here" and proceeded to prove his point by punching FBI Agent Patrick J. Collins. After this, Marcello landed himself back in federal prison. His first trial resulted in a hung jury, but he was retried and convicted. He was sentenced to two years but served less than six months.

In the 1960s, due to Marcello's stubborn refusal to induct new members into the crime family, the organization dwindled down to a paltry four or five "made men", with hundreds of associates throughout the United States. However, the Federal Bureau of Investigation believed there were a bit over 20 made men at the time, or more than 20 associates so close to Marcello and to each other, that they were considered a formal part of the New Orleans family hierarchy. Although the family was small in size, it exerted significant influence due to Marcello's political connections with state and federal judges, prosecutors, governors, senators, labour leaders, and law enforcement officials. Members of the New Orleans family received protection from Jim Garrison, the District Attorney of Orleans Parish, who dismissed eighty-four cases brought against Mafiosi, including one for attempted murder, three for kidnapping and one for manslaughter. Additionally, Marcello kept close associations with other Mafia bosses across the country, including Joseph "Joey Doves" Aiuppa of the Chicago Outfit, Santo Trafficante Jr. of the Tampa crime family, Nicholas Civella of the Kansas City crime family, Dominic Brooklier of the Los Angeles crime family, and Angelo Bruno of the Philadelphia crime family. The New Orleans family was also closely linked with the Dixie Mafia, initially through Marcello's association with LeRoy Hobbs, the Sheriff of Harrison County, Mississippi. Marcello permitted the Dixie Mafia to operate in New Orleans in exchange for a percentage of that group's earnings and on the condition that Dixie Mafia members avoid the attention of authorities and refrain from encroaching on Marcello's rackets. Under Marcello's rule, the family outsourced debt collection and contract killing to members of the Dixie Mafia and the Outlaws Motorcycle Club.

In its 1978 investigation of the assassination of John F. Kennedy, the House Select Committee on Assassinations said that it recognized Jack Ruby's murder of Lee Harvey Oswald as a primary reason to suspect organized crime as possibly having involvement in the assassination. In its investigation, the HSCA noted the presence of "credible associations relating both Lee Harvey Oswald and Jack Ruby to figures having a relationship, albeit tenuous, with Marcello's crime family or organization". Their report stated: "The committee found that Marcello had the motive, means and opportunity to have President John F. Kennedy assassinated, though it was unable to establish direct evidence of Marcello's complicity". Thus, Marcello was free of all accusations of killing John F. Kennedy.

In 1981, Marcello, Aubrey W. Young (a former aide to Governor John J. McKeithen), Charles E. Roemer, II (former commissioner of administration to Governor Edwin Edwards), and two other men were indicted in the U.S. District Court for the Eastern District of Louisiana in New Orleans with conspiracy, racketeering, and mail and wire fraud in a scheme to bribe state officials to give the five men multimillion-dollar insurance contracts. The charges were the result of a Federal Bureau of Investigation probe known as BriLab. U.S. District Judge Morey Sear allowed the admission of secretly-recorded conversations that he said demonstrated corruption at the highest levels of state government. Marcello and Roemer were convicted, but Young and the two others were acquitted. In January 1982, Marcello was sentenced to seven years in federal prison.

=== Joseph Marcello and Anthony Carollo ===
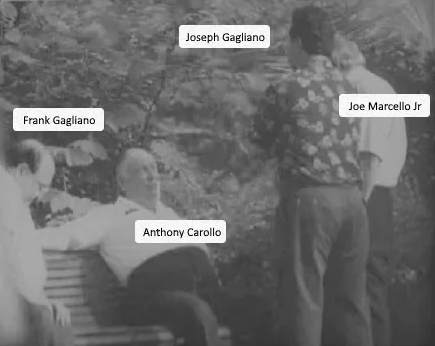
FBI surveillance photo of Frank Gagliano, Anthony Carollo, Joseph Gagliano and Joseph Marcello Jr. outside Frank's Deli in the early 1990s

Due to his imprisonment and ill health, Carlos Marcello lost the ability to manage the New Orleans family, and the organization became effectively leaderless. Carlos Marcello's younger brother and former underboss, Joseph Paul Marcello Jr., took control of the family as acting boss but was an ineffective leader. The owner of several restaurants in the New Orleans area, Joseph Marcello dedicated most of his efforts into the restaurant industry, while three other Marcello siblings, Vincent, Sammy and Anthony, focused solely on the family's slot machine business. The oldest Marcello brothers, Peter and Pascal, went into retirement, and Carlos Marcello's only son, Joseph "Little Joe" Marcello, was a multimillionaire legitimate businessman who never joined his father's crime family. In April 1982, Joseph Marcello was indicted on charges of lying to a grand jury investigating the assassination of Texas judge John H. Wood Jr. Wood had been killed in 1979 by the hitman Charles Harrelson under contract from the Texas drug lord Jamiel "Jimmy" Chagra, an associate of the Marcello family.

By 1986, two associates of the New Orleans family operating in the French Quarter, Frank Carraci and Nick Karno, had begun acting as independent racketeers, refusing to answer to Marcello and instead encouraging the arrival of the Gambino and Philadelphia crime families into New Orleans. In 1990, Anthony Carollo, the son of Silvestro "Silver Dollar Sam" Carollo and longtime New Orleans family member, became boss of the organization after Joseph Marcello stepped down. Carollo and an associate, Sebastian "Buster" Salvatore, met in New York with John Gotti and Salvatore "Sammy the Bull" Gravano of the Gambino family to seek assistance in taking over the soon-to-be-legalized video poker industry in Louisiana. Carollo's underboss, Frank "Fat Frank" Gagliano Sr., also authorized a request by representatives of the Philadelphia family for permission to move into casino gambling and cocaine trafficking in New Orleans.

In 1993, the FBI bugged Frank's Deli in the French Quarter, a popular meeting place for New Orleans mafiosi, as part of an investigation into how the Mafia was infiltrating the new poker industry in Louisiana. FBI wiretaps recorded conversations between the New Orleans Mafia leaders and helped authorities gain insight into the family's operations on the Mississippi Gulf Coast. The investigation also helped uncover the loose structure of the New Orleans Mafia. In May 1994, following an FBI sting dubbed "Operation Hard Crust", Carollo with 16 members of the Marcello, Gambino and Genovese families were arrested on charges of infiltrating the newly legalized Louisiana video poker industry, racketeering, illegal gambling and conspiracy. In September 1995, Carollo pleaded guilty to a single count of racketeering conspiracy, along with underboss Frank Gagliano, and associates Joseph Gagliano, Felix Riggio III, and Cade Farber. Carollo and Frank Gagliano were each sentenced to three years in prison, in March 1996.

=== Current status ===
The convictions which resulted from "Operation Hard Crust" effectively dismantled the New Orleans family, although surviving relatives of Carlos Marcello suspected of dealing in gambling, prostitution and other rackets remained under surveillance from law enforcement into the 2000s. According to Jim Bernazzani, a former head of the FBI's New Orleans field office, after attrition and sweeping racketeering cases decimated the crime family's leadership: "A lot of these offspring saw their uncles and fathers and grandfathers die in prison, and they decided to open restaurants". The decline of the Mafia in New Orleans coincided with a changing criminal landscape in the city, with African-American drug gangs becoming the predominant criminal force. In 2003 U.S. Attorney Jim Letten described New Orleans as an "open city" for Mafia activity. Boss Anthony Carollo died on February 1, 2007.

On May 7, 2014, two New Orleans family associates, Joseph F. Gagliano and Dominick Gullo, were arrested by Jefferson Parish Sheriff's Office deputies when they were pulled over traveling in a "sniper van" in the New Orleans suburb of Metairie. The 1998 Ford van was outfitted with gun ports and contained a loaded .22-caliber scoped rifle hidden under a carpet; an unregistered silencer in a side compartment; and an eight-inch cannon fuse under a sandbag behind the driver's seat. Afterwards, Metropolitan Crime Commission president Rafael Goyeneche described the New Orleans family as "no longer the overriding, omnipresent, powerful, tightly organized criminal operation that it was 50 years ago. But there are some remnants of it, and this [incident] may be a manifestation of the remnants". Bureau of Alcohol, Tobacco, Firearms and Explosives (ATF) spokesman Kevin Moran also said the crime family "may have gone underground a little bit, and I think, in today's culture, there are a lot more different criminal elements out there".

== Historical leadership ==
=== Boss (official and acting) ===
- c. 1860–1869 — Raffaele Agnello — murdered on April 1, 1869
- 1869–1872 — Joseph Agnello — murdered on April 20, 1872
- 1872–1891 — Joseph P. Macheca — lynched on March 14, 1891
- 1891–1922 — Charles Matranga — retired, died on October 28, 1943
- 1922–1944 — Corrado Giacona — died on July 25, 1944
- 1944 — Frank Todaro — died on November 29, 1944
- 1944–1947 — Silvestro "Silver Dollar Sam" Carollo — deported to Italy in 1947
- 1947–1990 — Carlos "Little Man" Marcello — imprisoned in 1983–1991
  - Acting 1983–1990 — Joseph Marcello Jr. — stepped down due to inability to control his organization
- 1990–2007 — Anthony Carollo — imprisoned in 1995–1998; died on February 1, 2007

=== Underboss ===
- c. 1860–1869 — Joseph Agnello — became boss
- 1869–1880: vacant/unknown
- 1880–1881 — Vincenzo Rebello — deported to Italy in 1881.
- 1881–1891 — Charles Matranga — became boss
- 1891–1896 — Salvatore Matranga — died on November 18, 1896
- 1896–1915 — Vincenzo Moreci — murdered on November 19, 1915
- 1915–1944 — Frank Todaro — became boss, died on November 29, 1944
- 1944–1953 — Joseph Poretto — stepped down
- 1953–1983 — Joseph Marcello Jr. — became boss
- 1983–2006 — Frank "Fat Frank" Gagliano Sr. — died on April 16, 2006

=== Consigliere ===
- c. 1950s–1972 — Vincenzo "Jimmy" Campo — died in 1972

== Current members ==
=== Associates ===
- Vincent Marcello Jr. — associate. Marcello is a nephew of Carlos Marcello, French Quarter bar owner, and convicted narcotics trafficker. In 1980, Marcello was indicted along with five others on federal drug trafficking charges relating to a Florida-to-New Orleans wholesale cocaine pipeline. On February 8, 1981, government witness Robert Lee Collins, who was in the process of testifying against several co-conspirators in the case, was killed by a car bomb as he reversed his pickup truck out of the driveway of his home in the Algiers neighborhood of New Orleans. The bombing was ordered by Anthony "Hialeah Tony" Scire, a South Florida-based Genovese family associate and cocaine supplier, and carried out by members of the Tampa chapter of the Outlaws Motorcycle Club. On August 5, 1981, Marcello was sentenced to 40 months in federal prison in the cocaine case. He was released on September 24, 1984. In April 2002, fifteen people were charged with federal drug and prostitution offenses after an FBI investigation into a brothel which operated in a property owned by Marcello off Canal Street.

== Former members ==
- Joseph F. "Joe" Gagliano — former soldier. Gagliano was the son of underboss Frank Gagliano Sr. and brother of associate Frank Gagliano Jr. He was inducted into the Marcello family in 1990. On May 31, 1994, Gagliano was one of 17 members and associates of the Marcello, Gambino and Genovese families indicted on federal charges related to the infiltration of the video poker industry in Louisiana. The indictments were the culmination of the FBI's "Operation Hardcrust" investigation, during which Frank's Restaurant in the French Quarter, owned by Gagliano's father, was bugged. On September 12, 1995, Galiano pleaded guilty to racketeering conspiracy. Later that year, he was charged in a separate case involving the scamming of a Biloxi, Mississippi casino, in which he also pleaded guilty. Gagliano was sentenced to three-and-a-half years in federal orison in the Louisiana case, which ran concurrently with a two-and-a-half year sentence imposed in the Mississippi case. He was released in 1999. On May 7, 2014, Gagliano was arrested along with Dominick Gullo after the pair were pulled over while driving a "sniper van" in Metairie. He pleaded guilty to being a felon in possession of a firearm and being in possession of a silencer, on January 30, 2015. On May 28, 2015, Gagliano was sentenced to 28 months in federal prison. He was released on April 14, 2017. Gagliano died on February 23, 2025, at the age of 65.
- Joseph Paul "Joe" Marcello Jr. — former underboss and acting boss. Marcello was a longtime underboss to his older brother, Carlos Marcello. He and three other members of the New Orleans family were among thirteen mobsters arrested during a Mafia summit at La Stella Restaurant in Queens, New York on September 22, 1966. No charges were filed after the arrests. Marcello owned several restaurants, including Elmwood Plantation in Jefferson Parish, La Louisiane and Broussard's in the French Quarter, and Lenfant's in Metairie. On April 21, 1982, he was indicted on charges of lying to a grand jury investigating the assassination of judge John H. Wood Jr. in Texas. Joseph Marcello became acting boss of the family in 1983 following the imprisonment of Carlos Marcello. In 1988, he filed for bankruptcy in order to protect himself from over $2.1 million in debts. Marcello stepped down as acting boss in 1990, allowing Anthony Carollo to take control of the family. On May 31, 1994, Marcello and sixteen other mobsters were indicted on federal charges relating to the infiltration of Worldwide Gaming of Louisiana Inc., a distributor of video poker machines. He pleaded guilty to racketering in September 1995 and was sentenced in March 1996 to two years and nine months' imprisonment and a $250,000 fine in restitution. He was released from federal prison on July 24, 1998. Marcello died of congestive heart failure at the age of 75, on June 12, 1999.
- Nofio Pecora — former Marcello lieutenant. Pecora was close to Marcello and played an important role in drug trafficking in the New Orleans area. He also ran prostitution rings and a strip club for the family.
- Joseph Poretto — Managed the Nola News wire service from 1946 till 1964. He also owned another wire service, Southern News Publishing Company, with two of Marcello's brothers. With Nofio Pecora he managed the Town and Country Motel's nearby restaurant.
- Sam Saia — Operated sports betting out of the Felix's Oyster House on Bourbon Street. He was described as "one of the biggest horse and sports bookmakers in Louisiana" by the FBI. Saia was a frequent visitor to Marcello's headquarters, the Town and Country Restaurant and Lounge, and its adjacent motel. He had ties to the Louisiana establishment, Saia and his son donated to the mayoral campaign of DeLesseps Morrison. In addition, he attended the Kentucky Derby and the World Series with Superintendent Scheuering, Assistant Superintendent Durel and Major DePaoli, all high-ranking members of the New Orleans Police Department.
- Sebastiano "Buster" Salvatore — former soldier. In 1990, Salvatore accompanied Marcello family boss Anthony Carollo at a meeting in New York with John Gotti and Salvatore Gravano of the Gambino family to discuss the families' infiltration of the video poker machine industry, which was legalized in 1992. Salvatore was convicted in the scheme along with 24 other members and associates of the Marcello, Gambino and Genovese families. He was found guilty of 28 counts of racketeering, conspiracy, mail and wire fraud and illegal gambling in 1995, and sentenced to 18 months in federal prison in March 1996. Salvatore was released on August 4, 1997. He died on December 28, 2014.

== Former associates ==
- Kent "Frenchy" Brouillette — former associate. Brouillette was a "fixer" for Carlos Marcello and a cousin of Louisiana Governor Edwin Edwards. He was convicted of operating prostitution rackets in the 1960s and 1970s. Brouillette was stabbed to death by William Bonham in a St. Roch flophouse on December 3, 2015, at the age of 79.
- Frank Joseph Caracci — former associate. Caracci owned nightclubs and strip clubs in the French Quarter, and operated gambling rackets in Louisiana and Texas. He was convicted in 1970 of bribing an IRS agent, sentenced to a year in prison and fined $10,000. In 1972, Caracci was convicted of illegally transporting a pinball machine across state lines, sentenced to two years' probation and fined $10,000. Louisiana Governor Edwin Edwards granted Caracci a pardon in 1976. By 1986, Caracci was operating independently after breaking away from the New Orleans family. In 1990, he travelled to Las Vegas with former New Orleans Police Department Assistant Superintendent Antoine Saacks as part of a contract Saacks had to find locations for video poker machines in the city. Saacks was suspended from the NOPD for violating department regulations by doing business with a video poker company. In April 1992, Caracci and his sons signed a contract with A.-Ace Video Gaming Co., a video poker company owned by Robert Guidry, to receive a commission of 25 percent of A.-Ace's profits for any video poker machines the Caraccis placed in businesses for the company. A.-Ace successfully defended itself against attempts by the Louisiana State Police to strip the company of its video poker license due to Caracci's alleged Mafia ties. Caracci died of heart disease on September 25, 1996, aged 72.
- Samuel "Nick Karno" Karnofsy — former associate. Karno was a Jewish-American organized crime figure and Bourbon Street nightclub owner. On August 18, 1978, he pleaded no contest to manslaughter and was given a five-year suspended sentence for the shooting death of Anthony Zappia, who was killed inside Karno's La Stradia Lounge on Bourbon Street in January 1974. By 1986, Karno had broken away from the New Orleans family and was operating as an independent racketeer. He died on May 4, 1994, aged 85.
- Phillip "Dandy Phil" Kastel — former associate. Kastel, a New York-born Jewish mobster, was an associate of the Marcello and Genovese families. Along with Carlos Marcello, Frank Costello and Jake Lansky, he owned the Beverly Club casino in Jefferson Parish. Kastel died by suicide on August 16, 1962, at the age of 68.
- Michael "Mickey" McLaney — former associate. McLaney briefly owned a Havana casino that was nationalized by the Castro regime in 1959. He and his brother William were involved in the 1961 Bay of Pigs Invasion and later in Operation Mongoose. He was involved in a 1968 corruption scandal and assasinaton plot along with Elliot Roosevelt in the Bahamas. He later resided in Haiti and operated casinos under the Duvalier family. His name appears in documents from multiple investigations into the 1963 assassination of President John F. Kennedy.
- Charles "Dutz" Murret - A top deputy to Carlos Marcello's lieutenant Sam Saia in the field of illegal bookmaking. Murret was the uncle by marriage of Lee Harvey Oswald. He died in 1964.
- Joseph Robert "Junior" Provenzano — former associate. On November 16, 1983, Provenzano was charged with allegedly assaulting federal grand jury witness John Rietzke on July 15, 1983, in retaliation for Rietzke's testimony against him before a grand jury investigating organized crime in Louisiana. On December 16, 1985, he and three others were indicted on federal charges of conspiracy to defraud an Alabama couple who had paid $10,000 to Provenzano to "fix" a case against their son, Carlton "Chip" Langford, who had been charged with armed robbery in Louisiana. Provenzano was sentenced to three years in prison. He died on July 27, 2009, aged 73.

== In popular culture ==
- The John Grisham novel and film The Client feature a fictionalized New Orleans Mafia family, which is trying to cover up its involvement in a Senator's murder.
- The 1999 HBO movie Vendetta, starring Christopher Walken and directed by Nicholas Meyer, is based on the true story of the March 14, 1891, lynchings of 11 Italians in New Orleans. Charles Matranga (also spelled "Mantranga" in some documents) was one of the intended victims, but managed to survive by hiding from the mob. In the Journal of American History, historian Clive Webb calls the movie a "compelling portrait of prejudice".
- The Marcano crime family are a fictionalized version of the New Orleans crime family in the 2016 video game Mafia III, which takes place in a fictional version of New Orleans called New Bordeaux, appearing as the main antagonists of the game.
- The Mafia boss Angelo Bronte from the 2018 video game Red Dead Redemption 2 is primarily based on Charles Mantranga. Bronte resides in the city of Saint Denis, which is based on New Orleans.

== See also ==
- Crime in Louisiana
- Italians in New Orleans
- List of Italian Mafia crime families

== Sources ==
=== Books ===
- Steece, David. "david steece's Paradox, The True Narrative of a Real Street Man" Paradox Sales, www.davidsteece.com 2009 ISBN 1-4392-6351-5
- Brouillette, Frenchy. Mr. New Orleans: The Life of a Big Easy Underworld Legend, Phoenix Books, 2009.
- Davis, John H. Mafia Kingfish: Carlos Marcello and the Assassination of John F. Kennedy. New York: Signet, 1989. ISBN 0-520-08410-1
- Fentress, James. Rebels and Mafiosi: Death in a Sicilian Landscape. New York: Cornell University Press, 2000. ISBN 0-8014-3539-0
- Kelly, Robert J. Encyclopedia of Organized Crime in the United States. Westport, Connecticut: Greenwood Press, 2000. ISBN 0-313-30653-2
- Kurtz, Michael L. (Autumn 1983). "Organized Crime in Louisiana History: Myth and Reality". Louisiana History: The Journal of the Louisiana Historical Association. 24 (4): 355–376. JSTOR 4232305.
- Raab, Selwyn (2005). Five Families: The Rise, Decline, and Resurgence of America's Most Powerful Mafia Empires. New York, N.Y.: St. Martin's Press. ISBN 978-1429907989.
- Reppetto, Thomas. American Mafia: A History of Its Rise to Power. New York: Henry Holt & Co., 2004. ISBN 0-8050-7798-7
- Scott, Peter Dale and Marshall, Jonathan. Cocaine Politics: Drugs, Armies, and the CIA in Central America. Berkeley: University of California Press, 1991. ISBN 0-520-07312-6
- Sifakis, Carl. The Mafia Encyclopedia. New York: Da Capo Press, 2005. ISBN 0-8160-5694-3
- Sifakis, Carl. The Encyclopedia of American Crime. New York: Facts on File Inc., 2001. ISBN 0-8160-4040-0
- Summers, Anthony. Conspiracy. New York: McGraw & Hill, 1989.
- Rappleye, Charles. All American Mafiosi. New York: Doubleday, 1991.

=== Reports ===
- Blakey, G. Robert (July 1982). Organized Crime in the United States: A Review of the Public Record (PDF) (Report). Notre Dame-Temple Organized Crime Research Program. Archived from the original (PDF) on July 7, 2021 – via Notre Dame Law School.
