= Michele Miranda =

Italian-American mobster (1896–1973)

- Born: July 26, 1896; San Giuseppe Vesuviano, Province of Naples, Kingdom of Italy
- Died: July 16, 1973 (aged 76); Boca Raton, Florida, U.S.
- Other name: "Big Mike"
- Occupation: Mobster
- Known for: Consigliere of the Genovese family; attendee at the Apalachin meeting
- Allegiance: Genovese crime family

Michele "Big Mike" Miranda (July 26, 1896 – July 16, 1973) was an Italian-American mobster who became a longtime member and later the consigliere of the Genovese crime family of New York City.

== Early life ==
Miranda was born in San Giuseppe Vesuviano, near Naples, and immigrated to the United States as a child in 1905, settling in New York City. In later years, his reported residence was in Forest Hills, Queens.

== Criminal career ==
Miranda became involved in crime as a teenager and was arrested in 1915 for petty theft and assault. During Prohibition, he was associated with Gaetano Lucchese and had ties to the Reina crime family.

After the Castellammarese War, Miranda aligned closely with Vito Genovese and became a made member of the Luciano/Genovese organization. In 1933 Genovese told a reporter "You want to know who really rules New York? It's four people: me, Lucky Luciano, Mike Miranda, and Dutch Schultz". In the 1940s and 1950s, he was described in organized-crime reference works as a senior figure involved in gambling, loansharking, and labor racketeering, and he rose into the top ranks of the Genovese family. In 1946 he attended the Havana Conference in Cuba.

=== Consigliere and Apalachin ===
After Genovese consolidated power in 1957, Miranda served as the Genovese family consigliere, alongside underboss Gerardo Catena.

On November 14, 1957, Miranda was among the mob leaders detained by law enforcement at the Apalachin meeting in Apalachin, New York. He received five years in prison and $10,000 fine, which was overturned on appeal.

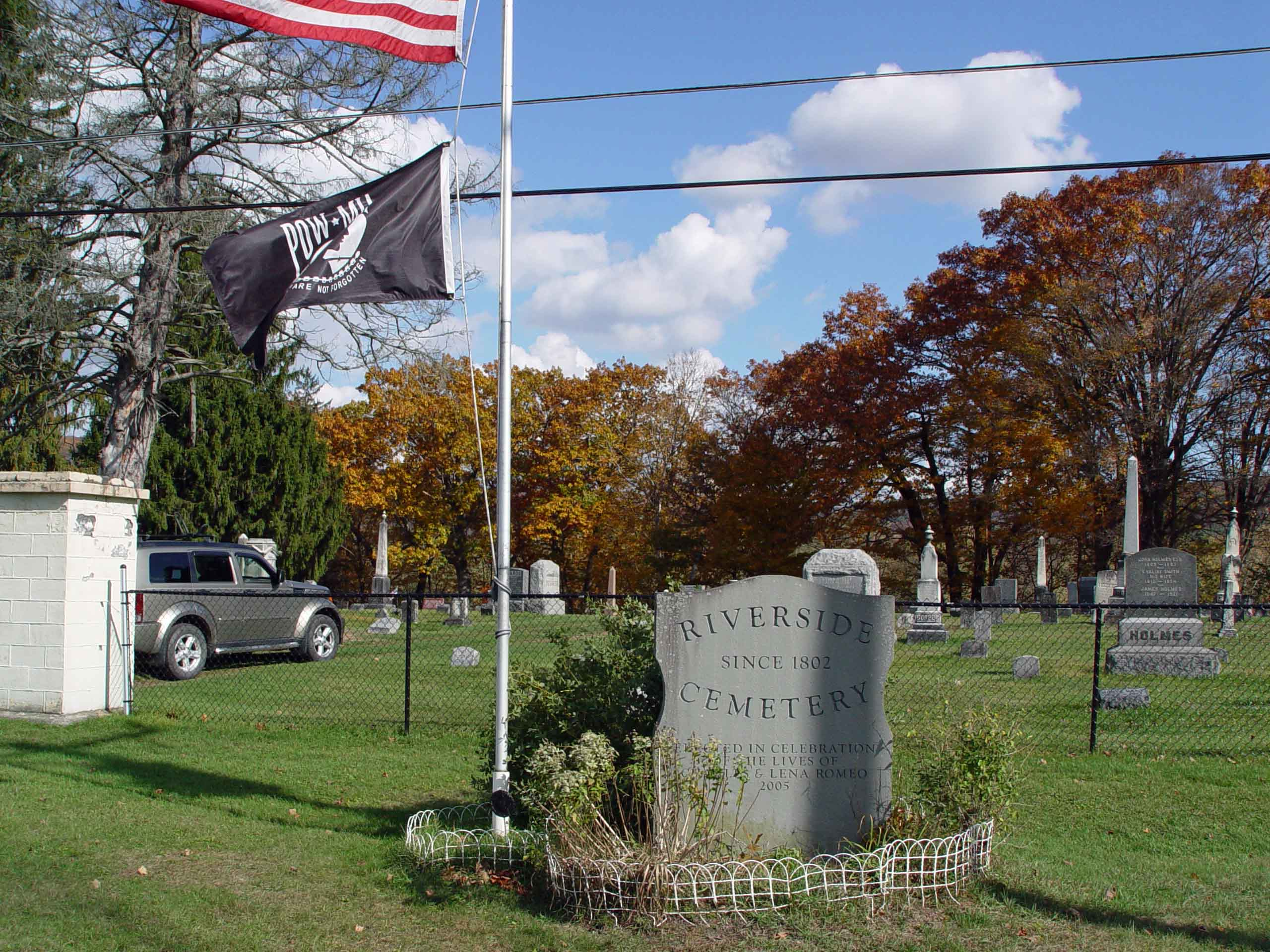
Riverside Cemetery in Apalachin, New York.

=== Genovese imprisoned; later arrests ===
After Genovese was imprisoned on narcotics charges in 1959, Miranda was identified in reference works as part of a ruling panel that helped oversee the Genovese family's day-to-day operations.

In 1965, Miranda was arrested in Queens in what press accounts described as a “Little Apalachin” raid targeting alleged Mafia figures for parole-related violations and associations. In September 1966 he was arrested along with twelve others after attending the La Stella Restaurant meeting.

== Retirement and death ==
Miranda retired from active involvement in family affairs in 1972 and died of natural causes in Boca Raton, Florida, on July 16, 1973.

== Sources ==
- Fox, Stephen (1989). Blood and Power: Organized Crime in Twentieth-Century America. William Morrow and Company. ISBN 0-688-04350-X.
- Kelly, Robert J. (2000). Encyclopedia of Organized Crime in the United States. Greenwood Press. ISBN 0-313-30653-2.
- Sifakis, Carl (2005). The Mafia Encyclopedia. Da Capo Press. ISBN 0-8160-5694-3.
- Sifakis, Carl (2001). The Encyclopedia of American Crime. Facts on File. ISBN 0-8160-4040-0.
- United States House of Representatives. Investigation of the Assassination of President John F. Kennedy (Report). House Select Committee on Assassinations. U.S. Government Printing Office.
- United States Senate, Committee on Government Operations (1964). Organized Crime and Illicit Traffic in Narcotics (Report). U.S. Government Printing Office.
