= Carlos Marcello =

American mobster (1910–1993)

- Born: Calogero Minacore; February 6, 1910; Tunis, French Tunisia
- Died: March 3, 1993 (aged 83); Metairie, Louisiana, U.S.
- Resting place: Metairie Cemetery, New Orleans, Louisiana, U.S.
- Other names: The Godfather; The Little Man
- Citizenship: American
- Occupation: Crime boss
- Predecessor: Silvestro Carollo
- Successor: Joseph Marcello
- Spouse: Jacqueline Todaro (m. 1936)
- Children: 4
- Relatives: Frank Todaro (uncle by marriage), Anthony Marcello (brother), Vincent Macaluso (cousin), Peter Marcello (brother), Vincent Marcello (brother), Rose Marcello (sister), Pascal Marcello (brother), Mary Marcello (sister)
- Allegiance: New Orleans crime family

Carlos Joseph Marcello (Italian: [mar'tʃɛlːlo], born Calogero Minacore, Italian: [kaˈlɔːdʒero minaˈkɔːre]; February 6, 1910 – March 3, 1993) was an Italian-American crime boss of the New Orleans crime family from 1947 to 1990.

Aside from his role in the American Mafia, he is also notorious for the reason that G. Robert Blakey and others have alleged that Carlos Marcello, Santo Trafficante Jr., and Sam Giancana conspired in the 1963 assassination of U.S. President John F. Kennedy in retaliation for federal investigations and prosecutions that threatened both the power and the multibillion-dollar profits of organized crime.

== Early life ==
Marcello was born on February 6, 1910, to Sicilian immigrants Giuseppe and Luigia Minacore, in Tunis, French Tunisia. With his family, Marcello immigrated to the United States in 1911 and settled in a decaying plantation house near Metairie in Jefferson Parish, a suburb of New Orleans. His father adopted a different family name to avoid confusion with his supervisor on the sugar plantation where he had started work. His overseer, also Minacore, chose the appellation Marcello. The family changed all their other names, and Calogero Minacore became Carlos Joseph Marcello. He had eight siblings: Peter, Rose, Mary, Pascal, Vincent, Joseph Jr., Anthony and Salvador Marcello.

His first arrest occurred in 1929 following the robbery of a local bank, the charges were eventually dropped. In 1930 Marcello hired two youngsters, aged 13 and 16, to perform an armed robbery at a grocery store. The robbery was unsuccessful and Marcello was tried as an accessory, receiving a sentence of nine years minimum imprisonment. In 1935 he was released after four years when he received a full pardon from the Louisiana Governor O.K. Allen. In 1938 he was arrested for involvement in what was then called "the biggest marijuana ring in New Orleans history". He served 10 months in prison in the Atlanta penitentiary. He also received a $76,820 fine but managed to reduce this down to $400 on grounds of poverty.

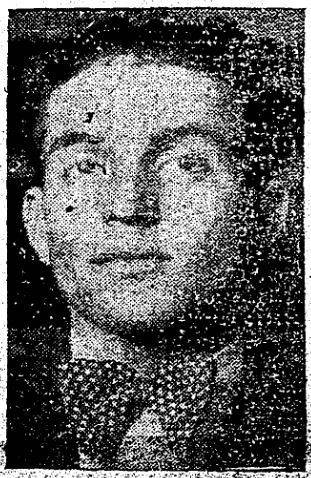
Marcello in his younger years

By the 1940s Marcello developed a relationship with Frank Costello, boss of the Luciano crime family. He arranged a deal with Costello whereby he would utilize Jefferson Music Company and Southern News Service, both companies Marcello owned, to control the pinballs, slot machines, and horse-playing handbooks in Louisiana. He also joined Costello and Meyer Lansky as a partner in the New Southport and Beverly Club casinos of Jefferson Parish, Louisiana. In 1946 he attended the Havana Conference in Cuba.

== Louisiana crime boss ==
By the end of 1947, Marcello had taken control of Louisiana's illegal gambling network. He had also joined forces with Genovese crime family associate Meyer Lansky in order to skim money from some of the most important casinos in the New Orleans area shortly after becoming associated with the Todaro family through marriage. According to former members of the Chicago Outfit, Marcello was also assigned a cut of the money skimmed from Las Vegas casinos, in exchange for providing "muscle" in Florida real estate deals. By this time, Marcello had been selected as "The Godfather" of the New Orleans Mafia, by the family's capos and with the approval of The Commission after the deportation of his predecessor, Silvestro Carollo, to Sicily. He held this position for the next thirty years. In a 1975 extortion trial, two witnesses described Marcello as "The Godfather" of the New Orleans crime syndicate.

Marcello cultivated a relationship with politician Earl Long, who was re-elected governor in 1948. Marcello gave Long $10,000 before the election and an additional $100,000 after he won. He later bragged that he had "bought Earl Long". When the 1956 election came around, Marcello upped his donations, this time giving Long $250,000. He continued to curry favor with later governors, like John McKeithen. In 1979 Marcello was recorded by the FBI venting that although he gave McKeithen $168,000, Louisianan politicians "take your fuckin' money, man, and then they tell you goodbye...I had McKeithen for eight years...then that son of a bitch too scared to talk to me". As one of his last acts as governor in 1964, Jimmie Davis approved a plan for the building of a levee at Marcello's property Churchill Farms. The contract stipulated that the state would put up $500,000 for its construction. In 1967 Davis' successor McKeithen approved the issuance of the check. When Life magazine exposed the contract McKeithen denied that he had ever issued a check.

Marcello appeared before the U.S. Senate's Kefauver Committee on organized crime on January 25, 1951. He pleaded the Fifth Amendment 152 times. The Committee called Marcello "one of the worst criminals in the country".

Marcello continued the family's long-standing tradition of fierce independence from interference by mafiosi in other areas. He enacted a policy that forbade mafiosi from other families from visiting Louisiana without first asking permission.

On March 24, 1959, Marcello appeared before the United States Senate's McClellan Committee investigating organized crime. Serving as Chief Counsel to the committee was Robert F. Kennedy; his brother, Senator John F. Kennedy, was a member of the committee. In response to committee questioning, Marcello invoked the Fifth Amendment and refused to answer any questions relating to his background, activities, and associates. From then on, Marcello became an avowed enemy of the Kennedys. He pled the Fifth just short of 70 times.

The New Orleans crime family frequently met at Mosca's Italian restaurant in the New Orleans suburb of Avondale, in a building which Marcello had owned.

== Prosecution ==
=== Deportation ===
Beginning in 1952 the US government had attempted to deport Marcello on the grounds of his 1938 drug conviction. In order to avoid deportation he dispatched Carl Noll to Guatemala, who arranged for Marcello's name to be inserted in a blank spot on the birth ledger of the village of San Jose Pinula. A clerk was paid to write in Marcello's birth with the same handwriting and ink as the other entries. The deportation endeavor had stalled but when Robert F. Kennedy was appointed Attorney General he revived the efforts. Marcello tried to use Frank Sinatra to convince Kennedy to ease off on his deportation attempts. Marcello contacted Santo Trafficante Jr., who in turn contacted Sinatra, requesting that he speak with Joseph Kennedy Sr., Bobby Kennedy's father. This attempt was unsuccessful.

In January 1961 Marcello met with a lobbyist for Dominican Republic dictator Rafael Trujillo. He offered him $200,000 for safe refuge in the country, however before they could come to an agreement he was deported. On April 4, 1961, the U.S. Justice Department, under the direction of Attorney General Robert F. Kennedy, apprehended Marcello as he made what he assumed was a routine visit to the immigration authorities in New Orleans, then speedily deported him to Guatemala before his lawyer could initiate court action to delay or stop the deportation. He returned to the United States on 28 May, onboard a Dominican Air Force jet. Thereafter, he successfully fought efforts by the government to deport him.

In November 1963, Marcello was tried for "conspiracy to defraud the United States government by obtaining a false Guatemalan birth certificate" and "conspiracy to obstruct the United States government in the exercise of its right to deport Carlos Marcello". He was acquitted later that month on both charges. However, in October 1964, Marcello was charged with "conspiring to obstruct justice by fixing a juror [Rudolph Heitler] and seeking the murder of a government witness [Carl Noll]". Marcello's attorney admitted Heitler had been bribed but said that there was no evidence to connect the bribe with Marcello. Noll refused to testify against Marcello in the case. Marcello was acquitted of both charges. Through Noll, Marcello had made an agreement with a local Guatemalan to enter Marcello's name and birth into the ledger of a Guatemalan village.

In September 1966, 13 members of the New York, Louisiana and Florida crime families were arrested for "consorting with known criminals" at the La Stella Restaurant in Queens, New York. However, the charges were later dropped. Returning to New Orleans a few days later, Marcello was arrested for assaulting an FBI agent. His first trial resulted in a hung jury, but he was retried and convicted. He was sentenced to two years but served less than six months. In January 1975 he was acquitted of federal charges that he had used extortion to take over the Crash Landing nightclub.

In 1981, Marcello, Aubrey W. Young (a former aide to Governor John J. McKeithen), Charles E. Roemer, II (former commissioner of administration to Governor Edwin Edwards), I. Irving Davidson, and one other man, were indicted in the U.S. District Court for the Eastern District of Louisiana in New Orleans with conspiracy, racketeering, and mail and wire fraud in a scheme to bribe state officials to give the five men multimillion-dollar insurance contracts. The charges were the result of a Federal Bureau of Investigation probe known as BriLab. U.S. District Judge Morey Sear allowed the admission of secretly-recorded conversations that he said demonstrated corruption at the highest levels of state government. Marcello and Roemer were convicted, but Young and the two others were acquitted.

== Kennedy assassination ==
In its 1978 investigation of the assassination of John F. Kennedy, the House Select Committee on Assassinations (HSCA) said that it recognized Jack Ruby's murder of Lee Harvey Oswald as a primary reason to suspect organized crime as possibly having involvement in the assassination. In its investigation, the HSCA noted the presence of "credible associations relating both Lee Harvey Oswald and Jack Ruby to figures having a relationship, albeit tenuous, with Marcello's crime family or organization". Their report stated: "The committee found that Marcello had the motive, means and opportunity to have President John F. Kennedy assassinated, though it was unable to establish direct evidence of Marcello's complicity". He was called to testify before the committee, when he denied any involvement in the assassination, but expressed a strong dislike for Bobby Kennedy, who had briefly deported him in 1961.

Ed Becker claimed that he visited Marcello at his farmhouse in Louisiana in September 1962 to discuss an oil deal and after they began drinking whiskey, in the presence of himself and two Marcello associates, Marcello described his intent to assassinate the President. According to Becker, Marcello shouted the Sicilian curse "Take that stone out of my shoe!" and went on to explain "Don't worry about that Bobby son-of-a-bitch. He's going to be taken care of", elaborating that "the dog will keep biting you if you only cut off its tail", which implied that President Kennedy would be assassinated in order to get the Attorney General Bobby Kennedy off the mafia's back. He added that Marcello told him they would get a "nut" to do it so that it could not be traced back to them. According to Becker he informed the FBI of this at that the time, but the FBI denied it had any records indicating such a thing. He repeated his allegation under oath when he was brought in to testify before the HSCA. When Marcello testified before the HSCA he rejected Becker's allegation, denying any such meeting took place. Becker's claim was first reported on in Ed Reid's book The Grim Reapers: The Anatomy of Organized Crime in America (1970). The FBI found out about the book and its contents in 1967. FBI agent George Bland subsequently paid Reid a visit, describing Becker as a "liar and a cheat". The FBI were unsuccessful in convincing Reid to drop the allegation from his book, although he did remove mention of Becker having reported the incident to the FBI. In 1992 Becker's employer at the time of the alleged incident, former FBI man Julian Blodgett, stated that two days later Becker informed him about it, and that he passed on the information to his contacts in the FBI Los Angeles bureau.

In their book, Fatal Hour: The Assassination of President Kennedy By Organized Crime, authors Richard N. Billings and G. Robert Blakey (who was chief counsel of the House Select Committee on Assassinations and previously Special Attorney in the Organized Crime and Racketeering Section of the Criminal Division of the U.S. Department of Justice under Attorney General Robert F. Kennedy) conclude that President Kennedy's murder was planned and carried out by Marcello and conspirators. They claim that their book lays out evidence that has been corroborated by additional sources and official records released in subsequent years. In his 1989 book, Mafia Kingfish: Carlos Marcello and the Assassination of John F. Kennedy, author John H. Davis implicates Marcello in the assassination of Kennedy. According to Davis, Oswald and Ruby had "strong ties" to Marcello.

In his 1994 autobiography Mob Lawyer, Frank Ragano, the attorney for Marcello, Trafficante, and Hoffa, says that he relayed a message in 1963 from Teamsters Union leader Jimmy Hoffa to Marcello and Santo Trafficante, the Mafia boss of Florida, urging the two Mafia bosses to kill Kennedy. He had previously made this claim in a 1992 interview with The New York Post. Ragano wrote that on March 13, 1987, a dying Trafficante (he died four days later) asked to meet him in Tampa for a hurried meeting. While riding in Ragano's car, Trafficante allegedly told Ragano in Sicilian: "Carlos e' futtutu. Non duvevamu ammazzari a Giovanni. Duvevamu ammazzari a Bobby," which Ragano translated as: "Carlos screwed up. We shouldn't have killed John. We should have killed Bobby." Ragano stated three witnesses could support his statement that he met Trafficante in Tampa. He refused to name them adding: "One guy is afraid of retaliation. The other guys are two doctors, who say they'll testify if they're summoned to court."

In his 2013 book The Hidden History of the JFK Assassination, Lamar Waldron claimed that Marcello masterminded the assassination of Kennedy. According to Waldron, Marcello admitted his involvement to two other inmates during a fit of rage in the prison yard at the Federal Correctional Institution in Texarkana, Texas. In his book, Waldron also presented the account of Marcello's prison cellmate, Jack Van Laningham, who claimed in 1985 that Marcello bragged to him that he had masterminded the Kennedy assassination, while planting red herrings to confuse the press and embarrass the FBI and CIA into suppressing evidence. According to Waldron, Marcello arranged for two hit men to carry out the assassination after entering the United States from Canada and Europe, while setting up Oswald as the fall guy and ordering the subsequent murder of various conspirators and witnesses who risked turning informants, including mobsters Johnny Roselli and Sam Giancana.

According to criminal underworld investigator and author Charles Brandt, "While in Texarkana Federal prison, during a two-day period in which Marcello was having blood pressure problems and was sent to the prison hospital, Marcello spoke to medical attendants as if they were members of his crime family. On three occasions he told them he had just met in New York with [Genovese capo Tony] 'Provenzano' and they would soon be celebrating, because they were 'going to get that smiling m.f. Kennedy in Dallas".

== Personal life ==
In 1936, Marcello married Jacqueline Todaro, the niece of senior New Orleans Mafioso Frank Todaro. They had four children, Louise Hampton, Joseph C. Marcello, Florence Black and Jacqueline Dugas.

== Death ==
Early in 1989, Marcello suffered a series of strokes. In July, in a surprise move, the 5th U.S. Circuit Court of Appeals threw out his BriLab conviction. One judge denied this reversal, but his decision in turn was overruled. In October, after having served six years and six months of his sentence, Marcello was released. Carlos Marcello died on March 2, 1993 at his home in New Orleans.

== In popular culture ==
- Marcello is portrayed by the actor Dino Tavarone in the 2008 Canadian French film The American Trap.
- In Bryce Zabel's 2014 novel Surrounded by Enemies: A Breakpoint Novel, in an alternative universe where President Kennedy survived the assassination, but agent Clint Hill and Texas Governor John Connally were killed, President Kennedy talked to his brother Attorney General Robert F. Kennedy, discussing suspects, including Marcello. Codenamed "New Orleans", Marcello was said to have motive and resources to carry out the attack.
- Sal Marcano, the chief antagonist of Mafia III is loosely based on Carlos Marcello.
- He is mentioned two times in Martin Scorsese's crime film The Irishman, which stars Robert De Niro as Frank Sheeran, who says: "But Bobby also goes after Giancana, Marcello, Trafficante, and all the other guys who put his brother in the White House in the first place". During the Frank Sheeran Appreciation Night, Anthony "Fat Tony" Salerno tells Russell Bufalino (referring to Jimmy Hoffa) "Because his guys are holding 'em back loans on Carlos's new hotel in New Orleans".
- He appears in Cormac McCarthy's novel The Passenger, observed in a New Orleans restaurant by protagonist Bobby Western and a detective Western has befriended.
- In Greg Iles' trilogy "Nachez Burning", Marcello is repeatedly referred to as the mastermind behind both JFK's assassination and a plan to also shoot Robert Kennedy when he became a presidential candidate in 1968.
- Marcello plays a significant role in James Ellroy's novel American Tabloid and its sequel The Cold Six Thousand, alongside other mafiosi including Sam Giancana, Santo Trafficante, Johnny Roselli and Hershel Ryskind. In the former novel, we read a fictionalized version of Marcello's deportation to Guatemala. More broadly, the novels cover fictionalised accounts of the Bay of Pigs, the election and assassination of J.F. Kennedy, and the assassinations of R.F. Kennedy and Martin Luther King. In Elloy's fiction, these have substantial mafia involvement.

== See also ==
- Italians in New Orleans

American Mafia
Preceded by Sylvestro Carolla	New Orleans crime family Boss; 1947–1983	Succeeded by Joseph Marcello Jr.
