= Santo Trafficante Jr. =

American crime boss (1914-1987)

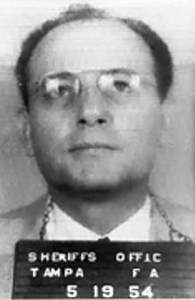
- Trafficante Jr.'s 1954 mugshot
- Born: November 15, 1914; Tampa, Florida, U.S.
- Died: March 17, 1987 (aged 72); Houston, Texas, U.S.
- Occupation: Crime boss
- Spouse: Josephine Trafficante
- Children: 2
- Parent: Santo Trafficante Sr.
- Allegiance: Trafficante crime family

Santo Trafficante Jr. (November 15, 1914 – March 17, 1987) was among the most powerful Mafia bosses in the United States. He headed the Trafficante crime family from 1954 to 1987 and controlled organized criminal operations in Florida and Cuba, which had previously been consolidated from several rival gangs by his father, Santo Trafficante Sr.

Trafficante maintained links to the Bonanno crime family in New York City, but was more closely allied with Sam Giancana in Chicago. Consequently, while generally recognized as the most powerful organized crime figure in Florida throughout much of the 20th century, Trafficante was not believed to have total control over Miami, Miami Beach, Ft. Lauderdale, or Palm Beach. The east coast of Florida was a loosely knit conglomerate of New York family interests with links to Meyer Lansky, Bugsy Siegel, Angelo Bruno, Carlos Marcello, and Frank Ragano.

Trafficante admitted his anti-Castro activities to the United States House Select Committee on Assassinations in 1978, and vehemently denied allegations that he had knowledge of a plot to assassinate President John F. Kennedy. Federal investigators brought racketeering and conspiracy charges against him in the summer of 1986, shortly before he died of a heart attack.

== Biography ==
=== Early life ===
Trafficante was born in Tampa, Florida, to Sicilian parents Santo Trafficante Sr. and his wife Maria Giuseppa Cacciatore in 1914. He grew up in a predominantly Cuban neighborhood in Tampa and spoke Spanish. He dropped out of high school before the 10th grade. Trafficante maintained several residences in New York City and Florida. U.S. Treasury Department documents indicate that law enforcement believed Trafficante's legitimate business interests to include several legal casinos in Cuba; a Havana drive-in movie theater; and shares in several restaurants and bars in Trafficante's hometown of Tampa, Florida. He was rumored to be part of a Mafia syndicate which owned many Cuban hotels and casinos.

Trafficante was arrested frequently throughout the 1950s on various charges of bribery and of running illegal bolita lotteries in Tampa's Ybor City district. He escaped conviction all but once, receiving a five-year sentence for bribery in 1954, but his conviction was overturned by the Florida Supreme Court before he entered prison.

During the 1950s, Trafficante Jr. maintained a narcotics trafficking network with Tommy Lucchese, the boss of the Lucchese crime family in New York City. Trafficante Jr. had known Lucchese since the 1940s, when his father and Lucchese had trained him in the mafia traditions. Trafficante Jr. would frequently meet with Lucchese in New York City for dinner.

=== Cuba ===
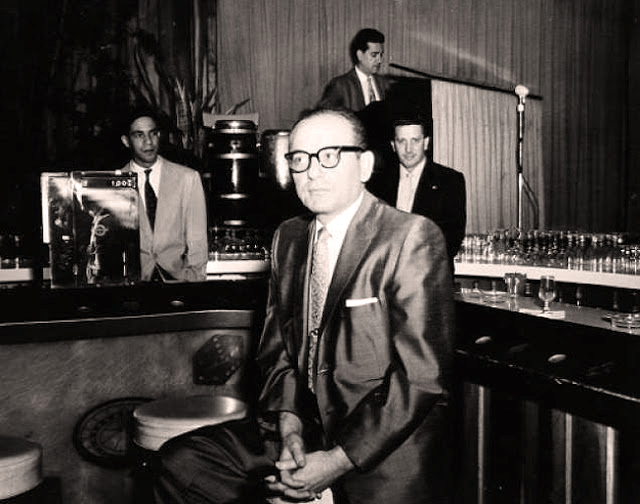
Santo Trafficante at San Souci’s bar. Havana, Cuba, 1955.

As one of the most powerful mobsters in the US, Trafficante was invited to the National Crime Syndicate-organized Havana Conference in December 1946, held at the Hotel Nacional de Cuba. One of the items on the agenda was the development of the mafia's business interests in Cuba. Trafficante began operating in Cuba in the late 1940s under his father, Santo Trafficante Sr., a mobster in Tampa, Florida. After his father died in 1954, he became the head in Tampa and took over his father's interests in Cuba. Over the years Trafficante rose to become the second most powerful mafiosi in Cuba, second only to Meyer Lansky.

Trafficante moved to Cuba in 1955, where he came into contact with Batista and Meyer Lansky. During the rule of Cuba's authoritarian dictator Fulgencio Batista, Trafficante openly operated the Sans Souci Cabaret and the Casino International gambling establishments in Havana. As a leading member of the syndicate, he also was suspected of having behind-the-scenes interests in other syndicate-owned Cuban casinos: the Hotel Habana Riviera, the Tropicana Club, the Sevilla-Biltmore, the Capri Hotel Casino, the Commodoro, the Hotel Deauville, and the Havana Hilton. Unlike most of the other American mafiosi, Trafficante spoke Spanish, which meant the Chicago Outfit came to rely on him as a translator in their dealings with Cuban authorities.

Throughout the 1950s Trafficante expanded his business interests in Cuba. He saw an abundance of opportunity in Havana, telling his lawyer Frank Ragano that "over here there's something for everybody...That's what makes this place so great". In 1955 he purchased the Sans-Souci club from the Mananrino brothers. Trafficante was a legal resident of the country, with his address listed at an apartment he had at the Sans-Souci. He invested in the casino at the Tropicana Club, owned by Cuban gangsters with ties to the Batista government, further enabling Trafficante to ingratiate himself with the Batista regime. In 1957 he opened the Hotel Capri, its opening ceremony was attended by officials of the Batista government.

Trafficante was apprehended in November 1957, along with over 60 other mobsters, at the Apalachin meeting in Apalachin, New York. At age 43 he was the youngest attendee. All were fined, up to $10,000 each, and given prison sentences ranging from three to five years. All the convictions were overturned on appeal in 1960. Cuba was one of the Apalachin topics of discussion, particularly the gambling and narcotics smuggling interests of La Cosa Nostra on the island. The international narcotics trade was also an important topic on the Apalachin agenda.

In January 1958, Trafficante was questioned by the Cuban police regarding the Apalachin meeting. A full report was made by the Cuban police, dated January 23, 1958, includes transcripts of long-distance telephone calls made from the Sans Souci during the period August–December 1957. The report was given to the District Attorney's office. In addition, "on January 23, 1958 the Cuban Department of Investigation, Havana, Cuba notified the Bureau of Narcotics that Santo Trafficante was registered in their Alien Office under No. 93461."

Castro pledged to close the casinos when he took power, leading to many mob men in Cuba to return to the United States, however Trafficante stayed in an attempt to keep his businesses going. He was the only top mobster to remain in Cuba post-Batista. Trafficante was taken by surprise when Castro nationalized the casinos and hotels; he expected that the mafia's Cuban revenue would never dry up, stating "who would have known that crazy guy, Castro, was going to take over and close the casinos?". Even after Castro overthrew Batista he did not expect a permanent shutdown of mafia operations, considering it a "temporary storm" that would "blow over" because the Cuban economy was too dependent on tourism or that Castro would be overthrown.

On June 6, 1959, Trafficante was arrested and imprisoned by the Castro government. During his imprisonment he was given permission to attend his daughter's wedding at the Havana Hilton hotel, at which he was surveilled. He was released on 18 August and subsequently deported back to the United States.

=== Plot to assassinate Castro ===
After Fidel Castro's revolutionary government seized the assets of Trafficante's Cuban businesses and expelled him from the country as an "undesirable alien," Trafficante came into contact with various US intelligence operatives, and was involved in several unsuccessful plans to assassinate Castro. In 1975, the CIA declassified a report stating that Trafficante had been persuaded to poison Castro, an allegation he denied. In 1997, further declassified documents indicated that some mafiosi worked with the agency on assassination attempts against Castro. The CIA and the Mafia had a common enemy in Castro, a communist revolutionary who had shut down Cuba's lucrative casino businesses. Trafficante hoped that if Castro was gotten rid of, he could reestablish his casino, hotel and narcotics businesses in Cuba.

The CIA's "Family Jewels" documents confirmed that in September 1960, the CIA recruited ex-FBI agent Robert Maheu to approach the West Coast representative of the Chicago mob, Johnny Roselli. Maheu hid that he was sent by the CIA, instead portraying himself an advocate for international corporations. He offered to pay $150,000 to have Castro killed, but Roselli declined any pay and introduced Maheu to two men he referred to as "Sam Gold" and "Joe." "Sam Gold" was Sam Giancana; "Joe" was Trafficante. Trafficante introduced the three aforementioned men to what he described as "very active" Cuban exiles in Florida. As a Spanish speaker Trafficante acted as a translator with the Spanish-speaking Cubans.

The CIA-Mafia plots were divided into two phases, the first lasted from August 1960 till May 1961, and the second from April 1962 till February 1963. Giancana and Trafficante were excluded from phase two, although Roselli was not. One such plot that occurred just before the Bay of Pigs Invasion, was an attempt to put poison pills in Castro's food. Trafficante referred the CIA to a leading Cuban exile figure which he believed had the means to pull this off. Money and pills were provided to this individual at a meeting attended by Maheu, Roselli and Trafficante at the Fountainbleau Hotel in Miami.

After his involvement in the CIA-Mafia plots came to an end, Trafficante continued to fund Cuban exile groups fighting against Castro. He financed the arms and ammunitions purchases of Aldo Vera Serafin's Movimiento Acciόn Patriόtica and negotiated an arms deal with Evelio Duques's Ejercito Cubano Anticommunista group. An August 1964 FBI report describes an exchange of cash between Trafficante and Francisco Prío, brother of former Cuban prime minister Carlos Prío Socarrás, in the First National Bank of Miami. Trafficante gave Prío $51,000 in cash. Trafficante also knew the Cuban revolutionary Rolando Cubela Secades, who he met as early as January 1959. Cubela's association with Trafficante later proved a problem when in June 1965 the CIA was tipped off that they had been in contact and that Cubela had discussed CIA Castro assassination plots with Trafficante. The CIA suspected that Trafficante had been passing information on to Castro and as a result cut off contact with Cubela.

=== French Connection and drug trafficking ===
Trafficante was a participant in the French connection, a scheme through which heroin was smuggled from Indochina through Turkey to France and then to the United States and Canada. An old associate of his from Cuba, Paul Mondoloni, was a key figure in the scheme. Trafficante was not involved in the actual process of shipment, instead he designated these duties to his trusted associates.

Through his contact in New York, Vincent Todaro, he received shipments from French diplomats. The cargo was hidden in cars or transported via ocean liners or ships. In 1962 he dispatched Frank Furci to Vietnam to seek out new distribution routes for the importation of heroin into the United States. In 1968 Trafficante went on a tour of Southeast Asia, visiting Saigon, Hong Kong and Singapore to explore opportunities for increasing shipments.

== JFK conspiracy allegations ==
=== House Select Committee on Assassinations ===
In 1976, Cuban exile and FBI informant Jose Aleman told The Washington Post that in September 1962, Trafficante had offered him a loan of $1.5 million to replace Aleman's three-story "ramshackle motel with a 12-story glass wonder." He said that Trafficante complained about the honesty of the Kennedys and their "attacks" on Jimmy Hoffa and other associates. According to Aleman, when he told Trafficante that President John F. Kennedy would likely be re-elected, Trafficante replied, "No, Jose, he is going to be hit." Aleman claimed to have reported Trafficante's comments to his FBI contacts, who "dismissed the Kennedy warnings as gangland braggadocio."

In 1978, both Trafficante and Aleman were called to testify before members of the United States House Select Committee on Assassinations investigating possible links between Kennedy assassin Lee Harvey Oswald and anti-Castro Cubans, including the theory that Castro had Kennedy killed in retaliation for the CIA's attempts on his own life. On September 27, 1978, Aleman reiterated to HSCA investigators that Trafficante had complained to him for hours in June or July 1963 about Kennedy's crackdown on organized crime at a meeting to discuss a business loan.

The HSCA had previously quoted Aleman as stating that he thought Trafficante's use of the phrase "he is going to be hit" meant that the mob boss knew Kennedy was going to be killed. When this was pointed out, Aleman denied that he meant he believed Kennedy was going to murdered and said he thought that Trafficante meant Kennedy was going to be "hit" by "a lot of votes for the Republican Party or something like that". He stated that he was concerned for his safety and was not certain that he had ever correctly heard or understood Trafficante's comment.

Trafficante was subpoened to appear before the HSCA. At his first appearance on 16 March 1977 he refused to answer any questions and invoked the Fifth amendment. However, after a grant of immunity from prosecution, Trafficante testified before the HSCA the following day, September 28. He admitted that he knew Aleman but denied the allegation that he told him that "Kennedy was going to be hit." He stated that he was positive that he did not say it because he always spoke to Aleman in Spanish, and said that there was no way to state the phrase in Spanish. Trafficante also stated that he had no recollection of meeting Oswald or Oswald's assassin, Jack Ruby. During his testimony, Trafficante also admitted for the first time that he had worked with the CIA from 1960 to 1961 for an attempt to poison Castro but stated that his role was only as an interpreter between CIA officials and Cuban exiles. He testified that he was brought into the plot by Roselli and Giancana, who had been recruited by Maheu. Trafficante said that he introduced the trio to Cuban exiles in Florida. He stated that he received no payment for his involvement and that he acted out of patriotism. With regard to Trafficante's alleged acquaintance with Jack Ruby, the HSCA ultimately concluded that on the basis of circumstantial evidence, there was a "distinct possibility" that Ruby had met Trafficante in Cuba in 1959, but that they could not form a "final conclusion" on the matter."

=== Frank Ragano ===
On January 14, 1992, Trafficante's former attorney, Frank Ragano, told Jack Newfield of the New York Post that he relayed a request from Hoffa to Trafficante and New Orleans boss Carlos Marcello to have Kennedy killed. He repeated the claim two days later on ABC's Good Morning America, in Newfield's Frontline report entitled JFK, Hoffa and Mob broadcast in November 1992, and again in his 1994 autobiography Mob Lawyer. According to Ragano, he met Hoffa at the Teamsters' headquarters in Washington, DC, then delivered the message to Trafficante and Marcello in a meeting at the Royal Orleans Hotel in New Orleans. He stated he was chosen by Hoffa because, as both Hoffa and Trafficante's lawyer, he could be assured of attorney–client privilege.

According to Ragano, he and his wife Nancy dined with Trafficante at the International Inn in Tampa, Florida on the night of the assassination, during the dinner a jubilant Trafficante raised a toast to "a hundred years of health and to John Kennedy's death". Ragano states that Trafficante told him the Department of Justice would now get off his back and that the mafia may get back into Cuba. Ragano also claimed that Trafficante, four days prior to his death, delivered a deathbed confession in Tampa, Florida. He stated that Trafficante told him "Carlos [Marcello] messed up. We shouldn't have killed Giovanni [John]. We should have killed Bobby". He claimed three witnesses could support his statement that he met Trafficante in Tampa, but refused to name them, adding: "One guy is afraid of retaliation. The other guys are two doctors, who say they'll testify if they're summoned to court." In his book Reclaiming History: The Assassination of President John F. Kennedy, Vincent Bugliosi has claimed there to be many flaws in Ragano's claims, including his own claim that Trafficante was most likely not in Tampa on the day in question, but was rather in North Miami Beach, Florida, receiving dialysis treatments.

In 2005, Lamar Waldron and Thom Hartmann's book Ultimate Sacrifice said that Trafficante was behind an aborted plot to kill Kennedy in Tampa on November 18, 1963.

== Later years and death ==
Trafficante was summoned to court in 1986 and questioned about his involvement with the King's Court Bottle Club operated by members of the Bonanno crime family, including undercover FBI agent Joseph D. "Joe" Pistone, a.k.a. Donnie Brasco. Trafficante again escaped conviction. On March 17, 1987, Trafficante died at the age of 72 at the Texas Heart Institute in Houston where he had gone for heart surgery. He was buried next to his parents in a mausoleum at L'Unione Italian Cemetery in Ybor City.

His wife, Josephine, died in 2015 at the age of 95; he is survived by two of his daughters. After the death of his wife, the Trafficante family sold their Tampa 1970-built home for $950,000. In February 2016, many of Trafficante's personal belongings were sold at an auction in St. Petersburg, Florida.

== Popular culture ==
Trafficante features in the film Donnie Brasco (1997), played by Val Avery. He is also portrayed by Roc LaFortune in Bonanno: A Godfather's Story (1999), and by Larry Day in the 2008 Canadian French film The American Trap. In the 1992 film Ruby the character of "Santos Alicante", played by Marc Lawrence, serves as a stand-in character for Trafficante.

Trafficante appears as a character in James Elroy's historical fiction Underworld USA Trilogy.

Business positions
Preceded by Santo Trafficante Sr.	Trafficante crime family Boss; 1954–1987	Succeeded by Vincent LoScalzo
