= Nicholas Santora =

American mobster

- Born: June 21, 1942
- Died: October 27, 2018 (aged 76)
- Occupation: Mobster
- Allegiance: Bonanno crime family
- Conviction: Racketeering conspiracy (1982)
- Penalty: 15 years' imprisonment

Nicholas Angelo "Nicky Mouth" Santora (June 21, 1942 – October 27, 2018) was the reputed underboss of the Bonanno crime family.

== Biography ==
=== Early life ===
Nicholas Santora was born on June 21, 1942, and became known in his teens as a tough mobster from New York City. He was the son of Modesto Santora, a sidewalk soldier for the Colombo crime family under boss Joseph Magliocco. Originally a member of a youth gang, Santora became a made man along with mobsters Dominick "Sonny Black" Napolitano, Benjamin "Lefty" Ruggiero and Joseph "Big Joey" Massino in the mid 1970s.

Santora became involved with the Bonanno family while boss Philip "Rusty" Rastelli was imprisoned. Rastelli's reign was threatened by Carmine "Lilo" Galante, who felt he was the rightful boss because he had been underboss and consigliere under boss Joe Bonanno. Santora started out in a crew led by Galante-supporter Michael "Mikey" Sabella, and became heavily involved with extortion, loansharking, labor racketeering, illegal gambling, truck hijacking, and murder for hire.

By 1978, Rastelli had heard rumors of Carmine Galante being the new boss of the Bonannos, but would not tolerate it. Another caporegime, Alphonse "Sonny Red" Indelicato, would be approached by Rastelli to organize the murder of Carmine Galante. Indelicato approached Santora, whose job was to deliver the message to mobsters Dominick Napolitano and Cesare Bonventre and report back to Indelicato. Since Sabella was loyal to Galante, it had to happen without Sabella knowing it.

On July 12, 1979, Carmine Galante was murdered just as he finished eating lunch at Joe and Mary's Italian-American Restaurant in Bushwick, Brooklyn along with friend Leonard Coppola and restaurant owner/cousin Giuseppe Turano. He was murdered by Anthony "Bruno" Indelicato, Dominick "Big Trin" Trinchera, Dominic "Sonny Black" Napolitano, Joseph "Big Joey" Massino and Louis "Louie Gaeta" Giongetti, who were all hired by Alphonse Indelicato.

After the Galante execution, several Galante supporters, including Michael Sabella, were demoted, as Trinchera, Massino, Napolitano and Bonventre were all promoted to captains of the Bonanno crime family. It is suspected his death was arranged by the heads of the other Five Families in New York, who had decided Galante's greed and ambition over the control of the multimillion-dollar heroin business were a threat to all their interests. Philip "Rusty" Rastelli was also involved and remained boss of the Bonannos.

With Dominick "Sonny Black" Napolitano as capo, The Motion Lounge crew would receive massive income as one of the most profitable crews in the Bonanno family. The soldiers were Nicholas Santora, Robert Caposio, John Cersani, John Zancocchio, Edward Barberra, Benjamin "Lefty" Ruggiero, Michael Sabella, Joseph Puma, Steven Maruca, Salvatore Farrugia, Antonio Tomasulo, Anthony "Fat Tony" Rabito, Frank DiStefano, Salvatore D'Ottavio, James Episcopa, as well as Mafia associate Joseph "Donnie Brasco" Pistone, who was actually an FBI agent working undercover.

Napolitano, after three years of work in Brooklyn, moved operations to Florida in 1980, where he and Donnie Brasco set up loansharking, illegal gambling, extortion, and racketeering operations with the permission of longtime Florida Boss Santo Trafficante, Jr. It was around this time that Santora would be put in charge of the entire Florida operation, along with Brasco. Back in New York, the leadership of Philip Rastelli had waned in popularity, as Alphonse Indelicato was seen as a more prominent figure as boss of the Bonanno family, which is why Napolitano moved operations into Florida, in hope of squeezing the rival faction out financially. Indelicato and two other captains, Trinchera and Philip "Phil Lucky" Giaccone began planning on taking over the family.

=== The three capos murder ===
Some of the clubs in Florida were eventually shut down due to local police and more pressure on organized crime. Eventually, they got back to New York, where the rival Indelicato faction had grown larger and more powerful. On May 5, 1981, just when a new war was about to break out within the Bonanno family, Alphonse Indelicato, Giaccone, and Trinchera were shot to death in an ambush at the 20/20 Club, a night club once run by Gambino crime family underboss "Sammy the Bull" Gravano. Indelicato's body turned up three weeks later in the Ruby street lot (a known Mafia graveyard) in Ozone Park, Queens, but the remains of the other two mobsters were not unearthed until 2004.

According to FBI agent Joseph D. Pistone, the murderers involved in the assassination of Indelicato were Nicholas Santora, "Sonny Black" Napolitano, John Cersani, Joseph Massino, Salvatore Vitale, Joseph DeSimone, Vito Rizzuto, Louis Giongetti, Santo Giordano, and Gerlando Sciascia. Benjamin "Lefty" Ruggiero and John Cersani were lookouts, and sent in after to clean up the massacre and dispose of the bodies along with Santora, Dominick Napolitano, James Episcopia, and Robert Caposio.

=== Operation Donnie Brasco ===
Anthony Indelicato went into hiding after the three capo slayings. Santora took over The Motion Lounge crew, and Napolitano was promoted to "street boss" for Philip Rastelli, who was still incarcerated. Brasco's FBI operation ended when Napolitano ordered the murder of Anthony Indelicato and gave the contract to Donnie Brasco, in order to make him a made man in the Bonanno family.

It was revealed days later that Donnie Brasco was really Joseph D. Pistone, an undercover agent for the FBI. Pistone had spent five years undercover. The order came down shortly after to kill Napolitano for having allowed such a breach in Mafia security. On August 17, 1981, Napolitano was asked to come to the basement of Bonanno associate Ron Filocomo in Flatlands, Brooklyn, where he was ambushed by Filocomo and capo Frank Lino, both of whom shot him to death. The contract came from Santora and Joseph Massino, on behalf of Rastelli.

=== Family regrouping ===
Santora became capo of Napolitano's old crew and Rastelli was released from prison, but Santora was soon put under indictment due to the testimony provided by Pistone. A total of 100 Bonanno crime family mobsters would be tried and convicted, including Rastelli and Anthony Indelicato, who were both found guilty of racketeering and the murder of Carmine Galante along with nine other Mafia associates in the infamous Mafia Commission Trial in 1986.

In November 1982, Santora, along with "Lefty" Ruggiero, Antonio Tomasulo, and Anthony "Fat Tony" Rabito, would be convicted in a six-week jury trial for racketeering conspiracy, receiving a 15-year prison sentence. After the Mafia Commission Trial in 1986, Bonanno Boss, Philip Rastelli, would be sentenced to 12 years in prison, released due to heart troubles on July 21, 1991, but died three days later in a Queens hospital on July 24. Joseph Massino took over as boss of the Bonanno family in August 1991.

Upon Santora's release in 1992, he created a partnership with newly promoted Bonanno acting consigliere, Anthony Rabito, in extortion, loansharking, illegal gambling, drug trafficking and money laundering operations in Brooklyn, Queens and the Bronx, throughout the mid 1990s. Santora, Rabito and Massino's brother-in-law, Salvatore "Good Looking Sal" Vitale, became close with Massino and they expanded their operations to become the top earners in the Bonanno crime family toward the late 1990s. Joseph Massino and the Bonanno family were brought back into the Five Families Commission again, after being expelled because of the Donnie Brasco fiasco.

In 2000, longtime Bonanno family consigliere, Anthony "Tony" Spero, was indicted on loansharking, racketeering and murder in November and in 2001 he was sentenced to life imprisonment. That gave Anthony Rabito a promotion as the official consigliere of the Bonannos. Toward 2003, indictments were again handed out, this time against their own boss and underboss, as Joseph Massino and Salvatore Vitale were held against bail for racketeering, arson, extortion, loansharking, money laundering, illegal gambling, conspiracy and seven murders. Because of this, Nicholas Santora was promoted to acting underboss in 2003.

The indictments were also released against capos Anthony "Tony Green" Urso and James "Big Lou" Tartaglione, who secretly agreed to wear a wire, and turn government witness. As Santora kept flying under the radar with Anthony Rabito, underboss Salvatore Vitale turned informant as the two capos handed him out in murder and racketeering charges, and with Joseph Massino on trial in March, 2004, the government put capos Michael "Mikey Nose" Mancuso and Vincent "Vinny Gorgeous" Basciano on trial for racketeering charges, which included murder and conspiracy.

=== Massino turns informant ===
In October 2004, the FBI began to dig up bodies at an infamous mob graveyard in Queens, known as "The Hole". They were looking for the bodies of three capos killed in the Bonanno family war in 1981. They found the bodies of Philip Giaccone and Dominick Trinchera. On February 4, 2005, the name of an informant was released to the press; Joseph Massino, who hoped to save his life and his assets, as he began to cooperate sometime in late September 2004, recording conversations with acting boss, Vincent Basciano, who was also convicted and jailed in July 2007.

Despite the testimony of Joseph Massino in 2005, Santora managed not to be noticed by the government until he was indicted along with Anthony Rabito, and 17 other members of the Bonanno family, in a loansharking and illegal gambling operation that was stretching from Brooklyn to Queens, Manhattan and Staten Island, which earned $210,000 a week from January 2003 to July 2004. This was mostly because of the death of Bonanno family capo Louis Mele, who died of natural causes in a room where an illegal gambling operation was based.

=== Underboss ===
From 2004 to February 13, 2007, Santora was the reputed underboss of the Bonanno crime family. Vincent Basciano remains the reputed boss of the Bonannos, with Anthony Rabito as consigliere and Salvatore "Sal the Iron Worker" Montagna as acting boss, reporting to Basciano in prison. Nicholas Santora was released from the Loretto Federal Correctional Institute in southwest Pennsylvania on September 16, 2009. Since Santora's mistrial in 2016, he had been living with his daughter in Franklin Square, New York. Nicholas Santora died on October 27, 2018, at the age of 76, while awaiting a new trial.

== In popular culture ==
Nicholas Santora is portrayed as "Nicky", by Bruno Kirby in the 1997 film Donnie Brasco, which follows the life of undercover agent Joseph D. Pistone, from 1978 to 1981. The character "Nicky" was shot and killed in the movie, whereas Santora in reality was not.

Nicholas Santora's younger brother "Tommy Santora" played the "Attacker" in the 1979 film The Driller Killer, directed by Abel Ferrara.

American Mafia
Preceded by Salvatore "Handsome Sal" Vitale	Bonanno crime family Underboss; 2004–2007	Succeeded by Thomas Defiore
