= Raymond Wean =

American mobster

Raymond J. Wean a.k.a. "Big Ray" (born c. 1935 Greenpoint, Brooklyn) was a Bonanno crime family associate who worked under capo Joe Massino and Dominick Napolitano.

== Biography ==
Raymond Wean was of English descent with relatives originating from Yorkshire, England, but born and raised in Brooklyn, New York. His family heritage could never allow him to join the ranks of the Bonanno crime family like fellow Massino associate German-American Duane Leisenheimer, but Raymond was allowed to work for the family as mainly an enforcer. Ray was a Philip Rastelli loyalist. He was described by FBI Special Agent Joseph Colgan that once when arresting him, he couldn't get the handcuffs around Wean's thick wrists. Colgan would also say, "Wean was a psychopath. He would have killed you and not batted an eye. But he was terrified of Joey (Massino)".

FBI Special Agent Joseph Pistone described Raymond as being a "tall, stocky, thick-handed guy". He never married, but maintained a relationship with a common-law wife. He suffered a heart attack in the 1970s and became afraid of dying in prison after being branded a three-time felon after his arrest in 1977. While he was sentenced to municipal jail in Manhattan his wife never received financial support from Joe Massino. FBI Special Agent Joseph Colgan and an assistant U.S. attorney testified before a special secret court hearing to lower Wean's $100,000 bail to $40,000 in exchange to testify. Ray's parents agreed and posted bail for him. He was an avid pool player and would compete with John Cersani and Dominick Napolitano at The Studio Lounge in Greenpoint, Brooklyn. While testifying against Massino he stated that he committed around "roughly 200 crimes".

Wean was arrested with Massino after conspiring to receive 225 cartons of merchandise stolen from an interstate shipment contained in a Hemingway Transport truck. Massino was tried for the truck hijacking in 1977 and acquitted. Wean was convicted and sentenced to three years in prison. In 1987, Massino was tried for murder and undercover FBI agent Joseph D. Pistone and Wean, now an FBI informant, testified against him.

Joe Massino was acquitted of the triple homicide and the conspiracies to murder Bonanno crime family mobster Joseph Pastore and Anthony Indelicato, after having already ordered and performed the task of executing his father, Alphonse Indelicato. He was the individual who informed the FBI of the plan for Massino to have Benjamin Ruggiero murdered for his association with undercover FBI agent Joe Pistone. He also revealed to the FBI, information about his involvement in the botched home invasion of Princess Ashraf Pahlavi, a sister to the Shah of Iran in 1980. He and John Cersani were let into the townhouse at 29 Beekman Place passing themselves off as air conditioner delivery men. During the robbery, Ray was shot in the hand while struggling with the security guard.
