= Anthony Rabito =

Consigliere of the Bonanno crime family

Anthony "Fat Tony" Rabito (born January 27, 1934) is an American mobster and the former consigliere of the New York Bonanno crime family during the 2010s.

== Legal issues ==
Vito Borelli, a Gambino family associate and the boyfriend of the daughter of former Gambino family boss, Paul Castellano, was murdered during the 1970s or in 1980 for insulting Castellano, depending on the source. It is believed Rabito contacted Borelli and lured him to a candy store that he owned located at 308 East 53rd Street in Midtown Manhattan, Borelli was dismembered by Roy DeMeo and his crew. Joseph Massino, the former boss of the Bonanno family, claimed that Borelli was murdered by John Gotti, however former Gambino family underboss, Sammy Gravano, claimed that Borelli was killed by Joe Watts and Frank DeCicco.

In November 1982, Rabito was sentenced to 13-years in prison for narcotics involving the sale of methaqualone pills, following a 6-year FBI investigation undertaken by undercover FBI agent Joseph Pistone, also implicated were Benjamin "Lefty" Ruggiero, Nicholas "Nicky Mouth" Santora, Antonio Tomasulo and Dominick "Sonny Black" Napolitano on charges including illegal gambling, narcotics distribution, murder and armed robbery.

In June 2005, Rabito was arrested for his involvement in an $15-million a year illegal gambling and loansharking operation based in Queens, Brooklyn, Manhattan and Staten Island, which was alleged to have overseen $30,000 a day in wagers and $10.5 million during an 18-month period.

In February 2007, Rabito was arrested by the FBI as part of a 37-count indictment including himself and 18 other Bonanno family affiliates for charges including racketeering, extortion, illegal gambling, securities fraud and conspiracy to murder.

Rabito had been incarcerated in Loretto Prison for gambling. When he was released, His probation officer prohibited him from frequenting alleged mob hangouts Bamonte's, Park Side Restaurant, Don Peppe and Rao's.
