= Antonio Tomasulo =

Italian-American mobster (1917–1987)

Antonio Tomasulo, also known as "Bootsie" (1917 – June 23, 1987), was an Italian-American mobster who served in the New York Bonanno crime family running a highly lucrative illegal slot machine gambling operation.

== Biography ==
Little is known of Tomasulo's personal background; he was born in Greenpoint, Brooklyn, was married, and had a son named Anthony. Tomasulo was a lifelong asthma sufferer. He owned the Capri Car Service auto body in Greenpoint, Brooklyn. Tomasulo earned the nickname "Bootsie" because he always wore boots. He was also a habituate of The Motion Lounge, a mob hangout in Williamsburg, Brooklyn.

At some point, Tomasulo began working for the Bonanno family. He worked in the Bonanno gambling operation that was run first by Dominick Napolitano and then later by Joseph Massino. Tomasulo eventually became a "made man", or full member, of the Bonanno family.

== Joker Poker ==
Over time, Tomasulo built a large illegal gambling empire consisted mainly of "Joker Poker" slot machine games. A "Joker Poker" machine allowed the player to play a five-card poker game. The better the player's hand, the bigger the machine payout. However, the odds were stacked heavily in the machine's favor. One of his machines generated up to $15,000 in revenue each week. Tomasulo placed Joker Poker machines in pizza parlors and dive bars across New York City.

As Tomasulo's slot machine empire grew, he soon delegated responsibility for collecting the slot machine revenues to his son Anthony, a Bonanno family associate. Anthony would visit each establishment hosting a machine, retrieve the money from the machine, and give the store or bar owner half the money. The rest of the money went to his father.

== Donnie Brasco ==
In the 1970s, Antonio became friends with "Donnie Brasco", a new family associate. Unknown to Tomasulo and everyone else, Brasco was really FBI agent Joseph D. Pistone, a Sicilian-American tasked with infiltrating the Bonanno family. Six years later, the FBI revealed that Pistone was their agent. Stunned and angry, the family leadership exacted punishment on those responsible for bringing Pistone into the family. One casualty was Napolitano, who was murdered. Although Tomasulo had also been friends with Pistone, the family spared his life. Tomasulo continued to work for capo Joseph Massino, who took over Napolitano's gambling operations.

In November 1982, Tomasulo, along with Lefty Ruggiero, Nicholas Santora, and Anthony "Fat Tony" Rabito, would be convicted in a six-week jury trial for racketeering conspiracy, receiving a 15-year prison sentence.

On June 23, 1987, Tomasulo suffered a severe asthma attack while sitting on the stoop of his Bensonhurst, Brooklyn apartment building and died.

== Death of Anthony ==
After Antonio's death, his son Anthony Tomasulo assumed that he would inherit his father's slot machine empire. However, Salvatore Vitale, the new acting boss of the family, ruled that a deceased mobster's rackets automatically revert to the family boss or acting boss. When informed of Vitale's decision by family soldier Michael Cardello, Anthony was livid. He then threatened to murder both Cardello and Vitale to take back the slot machines. Anthony later told another Bonanno capo that he was going to take the matter up with Genovese crime family boss Vincent Gigante.

Vitale consulted consigliere Anthony Spero who advised him to kill Tomasulo: "You better do it. Get it behind you. God forbid he kills you. We all lose." In May 1990 Anthony Tomasulo's body was found in the back of his van. Vitale inherited Antonio Tomasulo's gambling empire.

== Murderer indicted ==
The Bonanno crime family acting boss Anthony Urso was indicted on charges of extortion, loansharking, illegal gambling and conspiracy to murder Antonio's son, Anthony Tomasulo. Urso faced life if convicted, and pleaded guilty. In 2004, Urso was sentenced to 25 years in prison.
