= Tony Rossi =

Tony Rossi may refer to:

- Edgar Robb (born 1937), FBI agent who went undercover as Tony Rossi
- Tony Rossi (baseball) (born 1943), American college baseball coach

== See also ==
- Anthony T. Rossi (1900–1993), Italian immigrant who founded Tropicana Products
