= Indelicato =

Indelicato is an Italian surname. Notable people with the surname include:

- Al Indelicato (1931-1981), a high-ranking member of New York City's Bonanno crime family
- Anthony Indelicato (born 1947), a member of the Bonanno crime family and son of the above
- Mark Indelicato (born 1994), American actor
