= Frank Coppa =

Sicilian-American gangster in the Bonanno crime family

- Born: September 11, 1941; Brooklyn, New York, U.S.
- Died: October 17, 2023 (aged 82); Sarasota, Florida, U.S.
- Other name: "Big Frankie"
- Occupation: Mobster
- Children: 3
- Allegiance: Bonanno crime family

Frank Coppa Sr. (September 11, 1941 – October 17, 2023) was an American gangster in the Bonanno crime family who was a close friend of Joseph Massino and Frank Lino and made large sums of money in stock fraud schemes. In 2002, Coppa became the first Bonanno made man to turn state's evidence.

== Biography ==
Coppa was born in Brooklyn, New York. He graduated from high school and spent a few months in college before dropping out.

Coppa lived in Manalapan, New Jersey and Staten Island, but operated his criminal activities on the eastern edge of Bensonhurst and Willamsburg on the corner of Broadway and Kent Avenue in Brooklyn. This area included a low-income municipal housing project called Marlboro Houses, where he eventually became involved in drug trafficking.

Coppa acquired many assets, including parking garage leases, soft drink vending machine and coin-operated telephone contracts, and a chain of rotisserie chicken restaurants. Through his wife and sons, Coppa owned a school bus company named Three Brothers. He used his influence to win a city contract to bus children with disabilities to and from school.

=== Criminal career ===
At age 19, Coppa was arrested for attempted burglary of a clothing store, but did not spend any time in prison.

Coppa began his serious criminal career selling stolen watches and furs from transport truck hijackings, grossing $20,000. In Bensonhurst he associated with the Colombo crime family and Genovese crime family before he eventually joined the Bonanno family. He elevated himself from a "sidewalk soldier" to a shady businessman. Coppa was one of the Bonanno family's biggest mobsters on Wall Street and is credited for practically inventing the pump-and-dump stock scheme.

In the early 1970s, Coppa first became involved in stock fraud schemes. Coppa and his associates bought stock in Tucker Drilling, a nearly worthless oil drilling company. Coppa bribed stockbrokers to sell the stock to the public at high prices. For brokers who did not cooperate in the scheme, Coppa employed threats and physical violence. When the stock price reached a high point, Coppa and his associates sold their stock holdings. The remaining investors lost their investments.

In 1977, boss Carmine Galante inducted Coppa into the Bonanno family in recognition of his ability to earn money.

In 1978, Coppa survived an assassination attempt. As he was entering his Mercedes-Benz, at the Bagel Nosh restaurant on Richmond Avenue and Victory Boulevard on Staten Island, a bomb detonated. Coppa escaped with third degree burns and shrapnel wounds to his face, chest, and legs.

In 1979, Coppa was convicted for his role in the Tucker Drilling scam but successfully avoided a prison sentence.

After undercover FBI agent Donnie Brasco had his assignment ended in July 1981, Dominick Napolitano, who was one of the men responsible for bringing him into the family met his end. Therein on August 17, 1981, Frank Lino and Stefano Canone drove Napolitano to the house of Ronald Filocomo, a Bonanno family associate, for a meeting. Napolitano was greeted by Coppa, then thrown down the stairs to the house's basement by Lino and shot to death. Napolitano's body was discovered the following year.

During the 1980s, Coppa was indicted for income tax evasion for not declaring income received from his bus company. In 1992, Coppa was convicted and received several years in prison. In 1994, Coppa was released from prison.

By the late 1990s, Massino and Coppa had become close associates. Massino appreciated Coppa because his stock schemes netted large amounts of money for the Bonanno family. During this period, Massino and Coppa went to France with their wives to celebrate Massino's birthday. Coppa paid for the entire trip, which included stays at expensive hotels and meals at classy restaurants.

On March 3, 2000, Coppa was indicted on stock fraud charges. From 1993 to 1996, Coppa and other Bonanno associates collaborated with brokers at two defunct stock firms, White Rock Partners and State Street Capital Markets, to drive up the price of some penny stocks. In 2002, Coppa was convicted and sentenced to seven years in federal prison.

=== Government witness ===
In October 2002, having served several months on his recent stock fraud conviction, Coppa was indicted again on racketeering charges of extortion against Barry Weinberg, a Bonanno business associate. To avoid prosecution on his own criminal charges, Weinberg secretly recorded conversations for law enforcement in which Coppa pressed him for extortion payments.

Facing charges that would have all but assured he would die in prison if convicted, Coppa decided to become a government witness, later declaring that, "I didn't want to do no more time." He became the first member of the Bonanno family to break his blood oath; until then the Bonannos had been the only family to have never had a member turn informer since the Castellammarese War. Coppa's defection precipitated a mass defection of Bonanno leaders to the government, eventually including Massino himself.

Coppa testified against Massino. According to Coppa's testimony, the government allowed him to keep $1.7 million in personal assets and a townhouse in Florida.

Coppa died in Sarasota, Florida, at the age of 82 on October 17, 2023, while living under an assumed name. His death was not publicly reported until 2024.
