= Donnie Brasco: My Undercover Life in the Mafia =

Book by Joseph D. Pistone

- First edition cover
- Author: Joseph D. Pistone
- Language: English
- Genre: True crime
- Publication date: 1988 (Dutton Books) 1997 (Signet)
- Publication place: United States
- Pages: 416
- ISBN: 0-340-66637-4

Donnie Brasco: My Undercover Life in the Mafia (Hodder & Stoughton. ISBN 0-340-66637-4) is a 1988 autobiographical crime book written by Joseph D. Pistone (assisted by Richard Woodley) about his story as an FBI agent going undercover and infiltrating the Mafia. In 1997, the book was made into a feature film titled Donnie Brasco, starring Johnny Depp and Al Pacino.

== Plot ==
Joe Pistone becomes an FBI agent after spending time working for Naval Intelligence. He first goes undercover to infiltrate a theft ring. The operation pays off when the FBI arrests one of the largest and most profitable theft rings in history.

After the success of the operation, the FBI and Pistone consider going undercover and infiltrating truck hijacking gangs and the Mafia. After months of preparation, the FBI erases Pistone's personal history and he goes undercover as Donald Brasco, an expert jewel thief from Miami, Florida. Hanging out at known crime spots, such as bars and social clubs, he eventually befriends a bartender and joins a crime gang.

He moves on to Jilly Greca's crew, who are associates in the Colombo crime family. The crew are involved in truck hijacking and selling stolen merchandise. Brasco meets Anthony Mirra and the two begin hanging out. Mirra is a soldier in the Bonanno crime family and is a lot better connected, respected and feared than Greca's crew. Brasco decides it would be a better choice for the operation to go with Mirra, so he starts hanging out more with Mirra.

Through Mirra, Brasco meets another Bonanno soldier called Benjamin "Lefty" Ruggiero. When Mirra is sent back to prison, Brasco and Lefty become close friends. Brasco gains the reputation of being a trustworthy and good earner. He is responsible for several lucrative business ventures, including the Kings Court Bottle Club in Florida, which begins a good relationship with the Bonannos and Santo Trafficante.

The Bonannos, particularly captain Dominick "Sonny Black" Napolitano, are happy with Brasco's work and are prepared to sponsor him for membership into the mafia. Brasco struggles in his personal life because he does not see his real family often, spending months without seeing his wife and three daughters. A family dispute breaks out over who "owns" Donnie Brasco. Mirra claims he owns him since he brought him in, Lefty says he owns him because he was the first to put a claim on him, and Sonny Black as the captain says Brasco belongs to him.

After six years undercover, the operation becomes increasingly dangerous. Three powerful captains are murdered; gunned down by fellow Bonanno family members. The FBI want to pull the plug on the operation due to the danger of Brasco getting killed. Pistone wants to stay at least until he gets "made", in order to prove that the mafia is not invincible. A date is set when Brasco is ordered to come out of the operation. There are six weeks left until Brasco is revealed to be an FBI agent.

To become a made man, Brasco is ordered to kill Anthony "Bruno" Indelicato, although Bruno has fled New York. FBI agents eventually reveal to Sonny Black that their associate is actually an agent. Although Sonny Black and others consider it hard to believe that Brasco is an agent, he informs his superiors. The men responsible for bringing Brasco into the family are ordered to be murdered. Sonny Black and Mirra are murdered, while Lefty escapes death when he is arrested before he arrives at a meeting.

Pistone's work is not complete yet as he has to testify at trials all over America. Operation Donnie Brasco leads to more than 200 indictments and over 100 convictions of mafia members.

== Film adaptation ==
In 1997, the book was adapted into a narrative feature film starring Al Pacino and Johnny Depp as the titular Donnie Brasco. Louis DiGiaimo, a casting director who worked on The Godfather and a childhood friend of Pistone, consulted on the book and film.
