= Don Peppe =

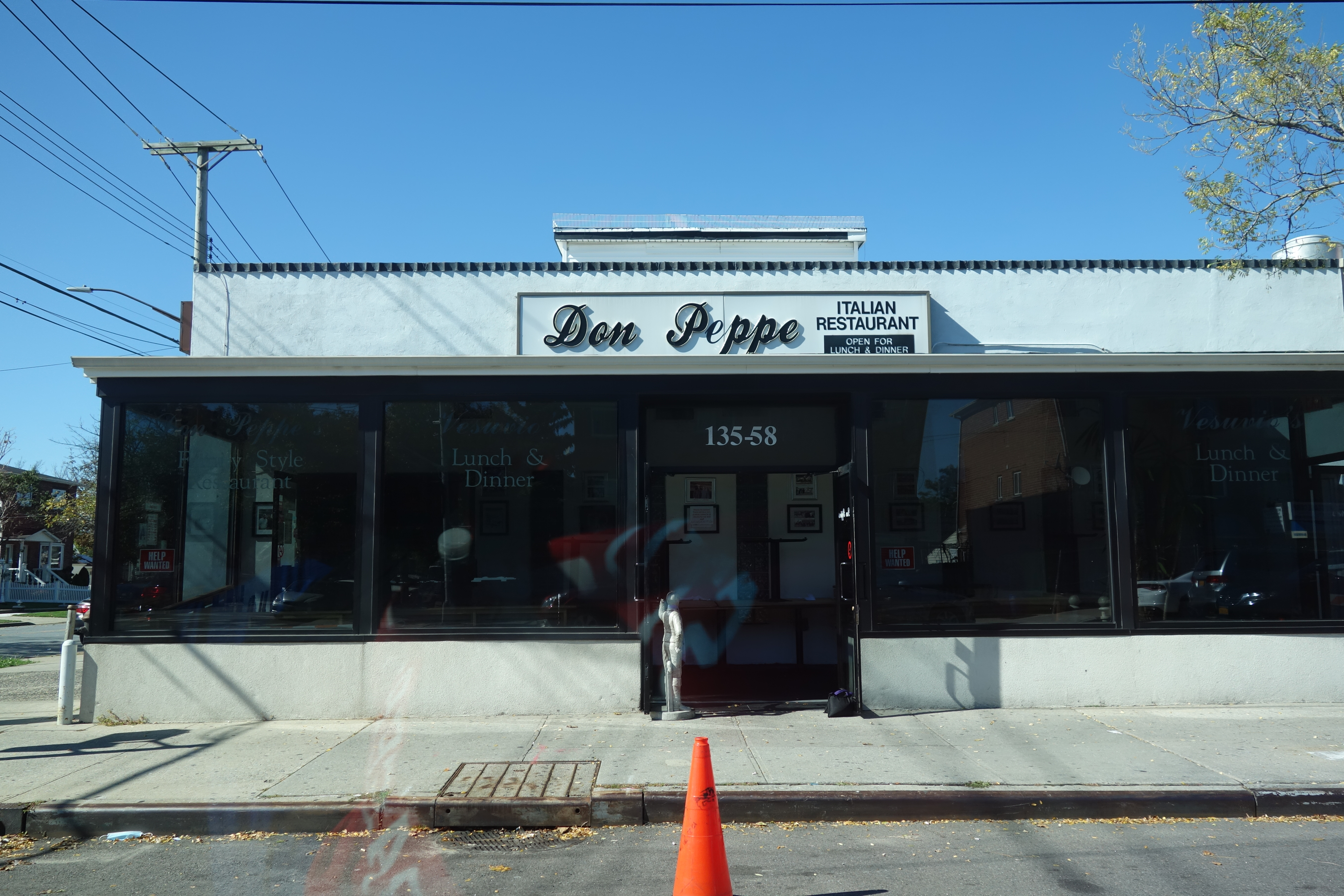
- The restaurant's exterior in 2020
- Interactive map of Don Peppe

Restaurant information
- Established: 1968
- Food type: Italian-American
- Dress code: casual
- Location: 135-58 Lefferts Boulevard, South Ozone Park, Queens, New York
- Coordinates: 40.66892°N 73.82169°W

Don Peppe is an Italian-American restaurant in South Ozone Park, Queens but was originally in Brooklyn.

Don Peppe is a half mile east of Aqueduct Racetrack and is decorated with photographs of thoroughbreds as well as jockey silks. They still have people from the track as customers but not as large as in the past. The racing decorations date back to the 1960s when they moved to Lefferts Boulevard from Brooklyn.

Along with Bamonte's, it was one of the restaurants Anthony "Fat Tony" Rabito, a Bonanno crime family Consigliere was forbidden to frequent by his probation officer. Rabito was told to stay away from “hot places” “because they are well known mob hangouts.”

Ciro Perrone was so upset that a waiter supposedly spilled a drink on his wife that he ordered his crew, which included Henry Hill, to beat the staffer with lead pipes and bats.

== In popular culture ==
- Entourage had a subplot with Turtle where he wanted to open a location in Los Angeles.
- The Best Thing I Ever Ate Season 3 for their linguini with clam sauce
