= Boston Society of Film Critics Award for Best Actor =

Annual US film award

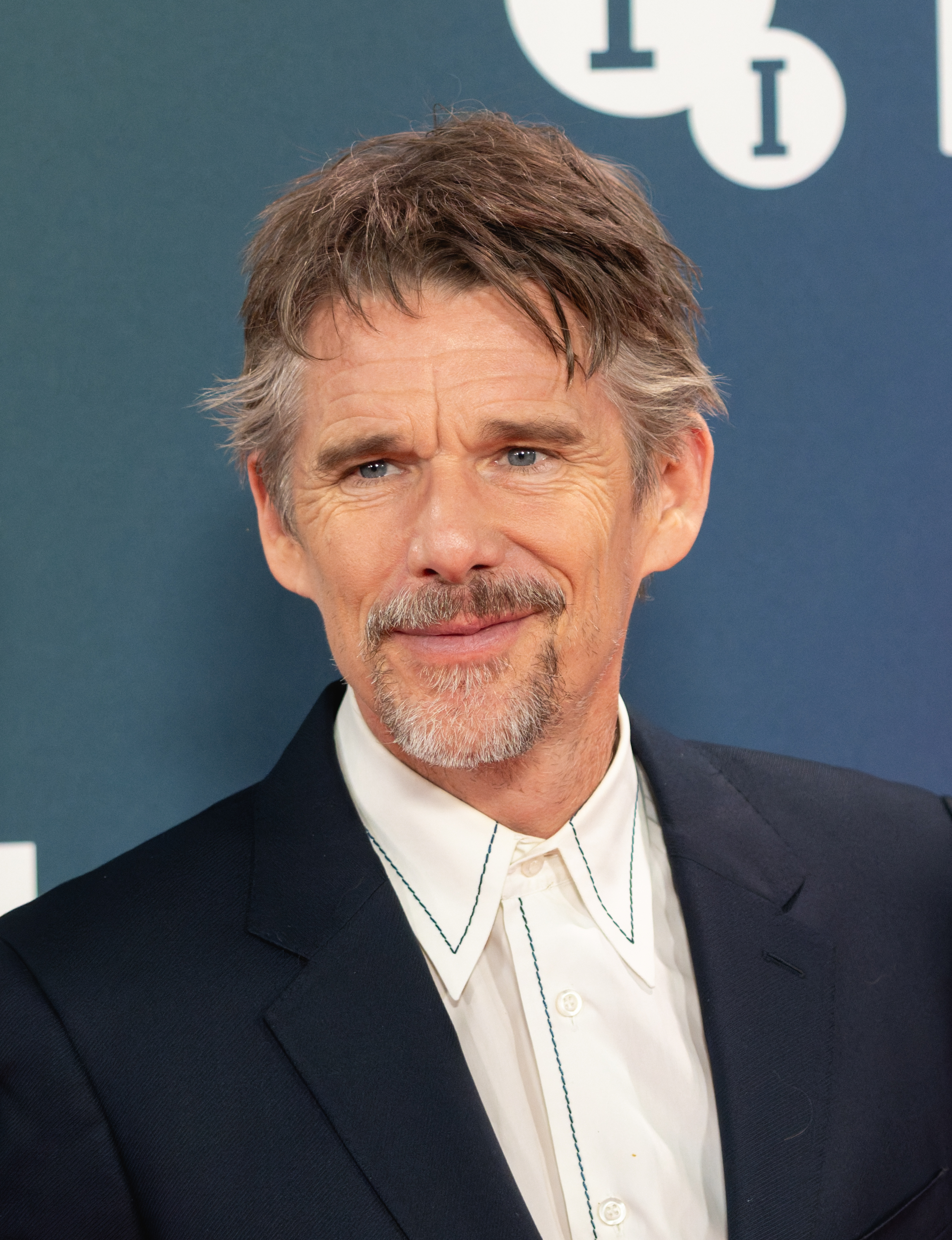
- Current recipient: Ethan Hawke
- Awarded for: Best Performance by an Actor in a Leading Role
- Country: United States
- Presented by: Boston Society of Film Critics
- First award: Robert De Niro; Raging Bull (1980)
- Currently held by: Ethan Hawke; Blue Moon (2025)
- Website: bostonfilmcritics.org

The Boston Society of Film Critics Award for Best (Lead) Actor is one of the annual film awards given by the Boston Society of Film Critics.

== 1980s ==
Year	Winner	Film	Role
1980	Robert De Niro	Raging Bull	Jake LaMotta
1981	Burt Lancaster	Atlantic City	Lou Pascal
1982	Dustin Hoffman	Tootsie	Michael Dorsey / Dorothy Michaels
1983	Eric Roberts	Star 80	Paul Snider
1984	Haing S. Ngor	The Killing Fields	Dith Pran
1985	Jack Nicholson	Prizzi's Honor	Charley Partanna
1986	Bob Hoskins	Mona Lisa	George
1987	Albert Brooks	Broadcast News	Aaron Altman
1988	Daniel Day-Lewis	The Unbearable Lightness of Being	Tomas
1989	Daniel Day-Lewis	My Left Foot	Christy Brown

== 1990s ==
Year	Winner	Film	Role
1990	Jeremy Irons	Reversal of Fortune	Claus von Bülow
1991	Nick Nolte	The Prince of Tides	Tom Wingo
1992	Denzel Washington	Malcolm X	Malcolm X
1993	Daniel Day-Lewis	In the Name of the Father	Gerard “Gerry” Conlon
1994	Albert Finney	The Browning Version	Andrew Crocker-Harris
1995	Nicolas Cage	Leaving Las Vegas	Ben Sanderson
1996	Geoffrey Rush	Shine	David Helfgott
1997	Al Pacino	Donnie Brasco	Benjamin “Lefty” Ruggiero
1998	Brendan Gleeson	The General	Martin Cahill
1998	Brendan Gleeson	I Went Down	Bunny Kelly
1999	Jim Carrey	Man on the Moon	Andy Kaufman / Tony Clifton

== 2000s ==
Year	Winner	Film	Role
2000	Colin Farrell	Tigerland	Private Roland Bozz
2001	Brian Cox	L.I.E.	Big John Harrigan
2001	Denzel Washington	Training Day	Detective Alonzo Harris
2002	Adrien Brody	The Pianist	Władysław “Wladek” Szpilman
2003	Bill Murray	Lost in Translation	Bob Harris
2004	Jamie Foxx	Ray	Ray Charles
2005	Philip Seymour Hoffman	Capote	Truman Capote
2006	Forest Whitaker	The Last King of Scotland	Idi Amin
2007	Frank Langella	Starting Out in the Evening	Leonard Schiller
2008	Sean Penn	Milk	Harvey Milk
2008	Mickey Rourke	The Wrestler	Robin Ramzinski
2009	Jeremy Renner	The Hurt Locker	SFC. William James

== 2010s ==
Year	Winner	Film	Role
2010	Jesse Eisenberg	The Social Network	Mark Zuckerberg
2011	Brad Pitt	Moneyball	Billy Beane
2012	Daniel Day-Lewis	Lincoln	Abraham Lincoln
2013	Chiwetel Ejiofor	12 Years a Slave	Solomon Northup
2014	Michael Keaton	Birdman	Riggan Thomson
2015	Paul Dano	Love & Mercy	Brian Wilson
2015	Leonardo DiCaprio	The Revenant	Hugh Glass
2016	Casey Affleck	Manchester by the Sea	Lee Chandler
2017	Daniel Kaluuya	Get Out	Chris Washington
2018	John C. Reilly	Stan & Ollie	Oliver Hardy
2019	Adam Sandler	Uncut Gems	Howard Ratner

== 2020s ==
Year	Winner	Film	Role
2020	Anthony Hopkins	The Father	Anthony Evans
2021	Hidetoshi Nishijima	Drive My Car	Yūsuke Kafuku
2022	Colin Farrell	The Banshees of Inisherin	Pádraic Súilleabháin
2022	Colin Farrell	After Yang	Jake
2023	Paul Giamatti	The Holdovers	Paul Hunham
2024	Timothée Chalamet	A Complete Unknown	Bob Dylan
2025	Ethan Hawke	Blue Moon	Lorenz Hart

== Multiple winners ==
- Daniel Day-Lewis - 4
- Colin Farrell - 2
- Denzel Washington - 2
