= Falcone (TV series) =

2000 American crime drama series

- Genre: Drama
- Based on: Characters from Donnie Brasco by Joseph D. Pistone with Richard Woodley
- Developed by: Bobby Moresco; Ken Solarz
- Starring: Sonny Marinelli; P. R. Paul; Allan Steele; Jason Gedrick
- Composers: Jay Gruska; Ross Levinson
- Country of origin: United States
- Original language: English
- No. of seasons: 1
- No. of episodes: 9

Production
- Executive producers: John Lee Hancock; Mark Johnson; Barry Levinson; Robert Moresco; Robert Singer; Ken Solarz
- Producers: Nan L. Bernstein; Elizabeth Cantillon; Louis DiGiaimo; Dan Leigh; Chris Long; Joseph D. Murphy; Lawrence E. Neiman; Lynn Raynor
- Production locations: New York City, New York Port Credit,(Mississauga) Ontario, Canada
- Cinematography: Steve Danyluk; Adam Holender
- Editors: Neil Felder; Armen Minasian; Anthony Pinker; John Showalter
- Running time: 60 minutes
- Production companies: Johnson/Hancock Productions; Mandalay Television; Lions Gate Television; December 3rd Productions; CBS Productions; Columbia TriStar Television

Original release
- Network: CBS
- Release: April 4 – April 12, 2000

Falcone is an American crime drama television series that ran for one season on CBS from April 4 until April 12, 2000. The story follows Joseph D. Pistone (Jason Gedrick), an FBI agent who goes undercover to bring down the American Mafia. The events depicted were based on a true story, which was also portrayed in the film Donnie Brasco, which was originally based on the autobiographical book Donnie Brasco: My Undercover Life in the Mafia by Joseph D. Pistone and Richard Woodley.

== Cast ==
- Jason Gedrick as Joseph D. Pistone/"Joe Falcone"
- Sonny Marinelli as Jimmy Suits
- P. R. Paul as Pasche
- Allan Steele as Sally Soaps
- Eric Roberts as Raymond "The Madman" Ricci
- Leo Rossi as Noah Dietrich
- Titus Welliver as Santino 'Sonny' Napoli
- Amy Carlson as Maggie Pistone
- Lillo Brancato Jr. as Alberto 'Lucky' Fema

== Production ==
The series had been expected to air on CBS in fall 1999, but it was initially left off the 1999–2000 television schedule. The pilot episode had been screened for CBS executives a week after the Columbine High School massacre, and CBS Television president Les Moonves thought its violent content was inappropriate to air so soon after the massacre.

The pilot was filmed in New York City, but after it was picked up for a series, the other eight episodes were filmed in Toronto for budgetary reasons.

== Episodes ==
No.	Title	Directed by	Written by	Original release date
1	"Pilot"	Gary Fleder	Bobby Moresco & Ken Solarz	April 4, 2000
2	"Tightrope"	Robert Singer	Bobby Moresco & Ken Solarz	April 4, 2000
3	"Windows"	David Grossman	Bobby Moresco & Ken Solarz	April 5, 2000
4	"Double Exposure"	Chris Long	Story by : Tom Benson; Teleplay by : Tom Benson and Bobby Moresco & Ken Solarz	April 6, 2000
5	"Lealta"	Richard J. Lewis	Tony Spiridakis	April 7, 2000
6	"That's Amore"	Rick Rosenthal	Story by : Douglas Stark; Teleplay by : Bobby Moresco & Ken Solarz and Douglas Stark	April 8, 2000
7	"But Not Forgotten"	John Lee Hancock	John Lee Hancock	April 10, 2000
8	"You Can't Always Get What You Want"	Chris Long	Story by : Bobby Moresco & Ken Solarz and Joseph D. Murphy; Teleplay by : Bobby Moresco & Ken Solarz	April 11, 2000
9	"Paying the Piper"	Robert Singer	Bobby Moresco & Ken Solarz	April 12, 2000
