= Louis DiGiaimo =

American casting director and film producer (1938–2015)

Louis DiGiaimo (1938 – December 19, 2015) was an American casting director and film producer. He was one of the casting directors of Francis Ford Coppola's The Godfather and went on to help cast multiple films each for directors William Friedkin, Barry Levinson and Ridley Scott. He also produced Mike Newell's Donnie Brasco alongside Levinson and, in 1998, he won the Primetime Emmy Award for Outstanding Casting for a Drama Series for Levinson's television series Homicide: Life on the Street.

== Biography ==
=== Early life and career ===
DiGiaimo spent his childhood in Paterson, New Jersey. He graduated from Fairleigh Dickinson University and worked as an accountant before embarking on a career as a casting director. His big break came in 1968 when he met director Martin Ritt, who was preparing to shoot the mafia drama The Brotherhood, starring Kirk Douglas. DiGiaimo's manner in seeking out both actors and non-actors for The Brotherhood impressed Ritt, and the director hired him to work on the film. DiGiaimo went on to make his debut as a principal casting director on a far more successful mafia picture, Francis Ford Coppola's Academy Award-winning The Godfather.

In between The Brotherhood and The Godfather, DiGiaimo worked with director William Friedkin for the first time on The French Connection, though his work on the film went uncredited. He reunited with Friedkin soon thereafter, this time as a principal casting director on the renowned horror hit The Exorcist. DiGiaimo cast several more films, including the 1975 releases Breakheart Pass and Farewell, My Lovely, before reteaming with Friedkin for The Brink's Job and yet again for Cruising. He was also casting director on Brian G. Hutton's The First Deadly Sin, which features Frank Sinatra in his last starring role.

=== Collaborations with Barry Levinson ===
DiGiaimo's first collaboration with Barry Levinson was on the 1984 baseball drama The Natural, for which DiGiaimo provided additional casting services. Levinson later recruited DiGiaimo as the primary casting director of his films Tin Men, Good Morning, Vietnam, Rain Man, Jimmy Hollywood, and Sleepers. DiGiaimo also handled additional casting on Levinson's Avalon.

When Levinson was developing the drama series Homicide: Life on the Street for NBC, he brought in DiGiaimo to handle the casting. For his work on Homicide, DiGiaimo received three consecutive Primetime Emmy Award nominations for Outstanding Casting for a Drama Series, winning the award in 1998. DiGiaimo and Levinson also worked together as producers on Mike Newell's crime drama Donnie Brasco (for which DiGiaimo was also casting director) and the Levinson-directed An Everlasting Piece.

=== Reuniting with Friedkin, collaborations with Ridley Scott, and more ===
Ten years after they last worked together on Cruising, DiGiaimo and Friedkin reteamed again for the director's 1990 horror film The Guardian. DiGiaimo also returned to the Exorcist franchise that year (albeit without Friedkin) as casting director of The Exorcist III, written and directed by the original film's writer, William Peter Blatty. Friedkin enlisted DiGiaimo's services one last time for the 1994 basketball drama Blue Chips.

Ridley Scott first called upon DiGiaimo to help him cast his 1991 film Thelma & Louise. For this film, it was DiGiaimo who pushed for a then-relatively unknown Brad Pitt to be cast in the role of J.D. Pitt landed the part, and his work in the film helped jump-start his career. The success of this initial union led to DiGiaimo casting Scott's next five films: 1492: Conquest of Paradise, White Squall, G.I. Jane, the Academy Award-winning Gladiator, and Hannibal.

Other directors whose movies DiGiaimo helped cast include John Frankenheimer (52 Pick-Up), Luis Llosa (Sniper), Brian Gibson (The Juror), Sidney Lumet (Gloria), Luis Mandoki (Trapped), and Richard Donner (16 Blocks). He also produced Bob Giraldi's independent film Dinner Rush. His final film as casting director was Nick Stagliano's Good Day for It, released in 2011.

=== Death ===
A 42-year resident of Oakland, New Jersey, DiGiaimo died there on December 19, 2015, due to complications from a stroke. He was 77 years old.

== Filmography ==
He was a producer in all films unless otherwise noted.

=== Film ===
Year	Film	Notes
1997	Donnie Brasco	
2000	Dinner Rush	
2000	An Everlasting Piece	Final film as a producer

As casting director

Year	Film	Notes
1972	The Godfather	
1972	A Separate Peace	
1973	Cops and Robbers	
1973	The Exorcist	
1975	Rancho Deluxe	
1975	Farewell, My Lovely	
1975	Russian Roulette	
1975	92 in the Shade	
1975	Breakheart Pass	
1977	Sorcerer	
1978	The Brink's Job	
1980	Cruising	
1980	The First Deadly Sin	
1982	Vigilante	
1984	A Stroke of Genius	
1985	Porky's Revenge!	
1985	Invasion U.S.A.	
1985	Stiffs	
1986	52 Pick-Up	
1987	Tin Men	
1987	Deadly Illusion	
1987	Good Morning, Vietnam	
1988	Red Scorpion	
1988	Rain Man	
1989	The Package	
1989	Indio	
1989	Hell High	
1990	The Guardian	
1990	The Exorcist III	
1990	The Exorcist III: Legion	Director's cut
1991	Indio 2: The Revolt	
1991	Thelma & Louise	
1991	Year of the Gun	
1991	29th Street	
1992	1492: Conquest of Paradise	
1992	Mom I Can Do It	
1993	Sniper	
1993	Trauma	
1993	New York Undercover Cop	
1993	Wilder Napalm	
1994	Blue Chips	
1994	Jimmy Hollywood	
1995	Sons of Trinity	
1995	Under Siege 2: Dark Territory	
1996	The Juror	
1996	White Squall	
1996	Sleepers	
1997	Donnie Brasco	
1997	The Brave	
1997	G.I. Jane	
1998	Meschugge	
1999	Gloria	
1999	Black and White	
2000	Gladiator	
2000	Luckytown	
2001	Hannibal	
2001	'R Xmas	
2001	One Eyed King	
2002	Trapped	
2004	Blueberry	
2006	Bandidas	
2006	16 Blocks	
2006	Brother's Shadow	
2007	The Poet	
2007	Made in Brooklyn	
2009	Baby on Board	
2010	For Love Alone	
2011	Good Day for It	

Casting department

Year	Film	Role
1973	From the Mixed-Up Files of Mrs. Basil E. Frankweiler	Extras casting
1973	The Seven-Ups	Extras casting
1975	Sheila Levine Is Dead and Living in New York	Additional casting
1981	Nighthawks	Additional casting
1982	Monsignor	Casting: New York
1983	Easy Money	Additional casting Extras casting
1984	The Natural	Additional casting
1986	The Money Pit	Extras casting
1986	Off Beat	Additional casting
1987	84 Charing Cross Road	Extras casting: New York
1988	Married to the Mob	Additional casting
1988	Homeboy	Extras casting
1989	Cookie	Extras casting
1990	Amazon	Casting consultant
1990	Avalon	Additional casting
1991	Missing Pieces	Extras casting
1993	The Young Americans	Casting: US
1998	The Nephew	Casting: US

=== Television ===
Year	Title	Notes
2000	Falcone	
2007	Fort Pit	Television pilot

As casting director

Year	Film	Notes
1974−75	Movin' On	
1975	Strike Force	Television film
1981	CBS Afternoon Playhouse	
1985	Out of the Darkness	Television film
1985−87	Night Heat	
1989	Ocean	
1992	In the Shadow of a Killer	Television film
1993	Beyond the Law	Television film
1997	The Hunger	
1998	Tower of the Firstborn	Television film
1998−99	Soldier of Fortune, Inc.	
1993−99	Homicide: Life on the Street	
1999	The Hoop Life	
2000	Homicide: The Movie	Television film
2000	Falcone	
2001	Nero Wolfe	
2001	Boss of Bosses	Television film
2001	The Big Heist	Television film
