= The Motion Lounge =

Nightclub in Brooklyn, New York, US

Coordinates: 40°43′3.03″N 73°56′40.91″W

The Motion Lounge was a nightclub located at 420 Graham Avenue, Williamsburg, Brooklyn. This was a hangout for the Bonanno crime family under caporegime Dominick "Sonny Black" Napolitano. It was one of the central locations in FBI agent Joseph D. Pistone's six-year undercover operation to infiltrate the Mafia, and featured in his autobiography Donnie Brasco: My Undercover Life in the Mafia. A fictionalized version of the lounge featured in the film adaptation, Donnie Brasco.
