= John Zancocchio =

American mobster

John "Porky" Zancocchio (born November 27, 1957) is an American mobster and former Consigliere with the Bonanno crime family who is a loanshark and a bookmaker.

== Biography ==
Born in Brooklyn, New York, Zancocchio started working under Bonanno caporegime Dominick Napolitano in the early 1970s. After Napolitano's killing as a result of the Donnie Brasco scandal, Zancocchio worked for capo Anthony Graziano. During the 1980s, Zancocchio married Graziano's daughter Lana, making him brother-in-law to Bonanno mobsters Christian Ludwigsen and Hector Pagan.

Over time, Zancocchio built a major bookmaking operation that grossed $280 million a year at its high point. His operation served many influential and wealthy gamblers, including Pete Rose. Zancocchio also opened a Brooklyn pizzeria called "Mama Rosa's", which he leased to his mother. However, Zancocchio's financial dealings with the restaurant resulted in his first prosecution for income tax evasion. Zancocchio pleaded guilty and was fined $100,000 and sentenced to one year in prison. His mother Rose was also indicted at this time.

In 2002, Zancocchio and Lana were charged with income tax evasion for the years 1995 to 2000. The two pleaded guilty and Zancocchio received 71 months in prison and a $300,000 fine. Lana faced a 16-month sentence, but her attorney negotiated a house arrest deal so that she could take care of their three young children. Lana told an author writing a book on mob women that,

... after the split with her husband, she was forced to admit the possibility that John married her only to get closer to her father. 'I have to face it that I was used, that he really didn't love me. In plain English, if that's how he feels, fuck him.'

Zancocchio served his sentence at the Devens Federal Medical Center in Massachusetts and was released from prison on August 29, 2008.

In February 2018, he went back to prison. He was held at the Metropolitan Correctional Center, New York on racketeering charges. Zancocchio was released from prison on July 31, 2018, and was acquitted of racketeering and conspiracy charges on March 13, 2019. At the time, he was a resident of Staten Island.

American Mafia
Preceded by Simone Esposito	Bonanno crime family Consigliere; 2016–2019	Succeeded by Unknown
