= Ciro Perrone =

American mobster in the Genovese crime family

Ciro Perrone (January 8, 1921 – November 26, 2011) was a New York City mobster and soldier in the Genovese crime family. Perrone was captain Matthew Ianniello's top soldier and his second-in-command since the 1970s.

At various times, Perrone served as the acting captain of Ianniello's powerful Downtown Manhattan crew. This crew was active with gambling activities in Times Square, labor racketeering, skimming money from business, and the Feast of San Gennaro street festival in Little Italy, Manhattan. Genovese crime family associate Paul Kahl is the son-in-law of Perrone born c.a. 1952.

Perrone mainly operated from Don Peppe, an Italian restaurant in Ozone Park, Queens. FBI surveillance devices picked up many conversations between Perrone and other family members, including several in which Perrone complained of the Growing Up Gotti TV show. In one conversation, Perrone exclaimed: "It's a soap opera, and the kids look like girls." Colombo crime family member Ralph Scopo, Jr. replied that it tarnished mob boss John Gotti's image. Both said it was making Italian-Americans look bad.

On July 28, 2007, Perrone was indicted on charges of obstruction of justice, extortion, loansharking, labor racketeering, and the operation of illegal gambling businesses. Perrone was convicted at his retrial and will face about four years in a federal prison. He will be over 90 before being eligible for release. Perrone was imprisoned at the Federal Medical Facility Devens in eastern Massachusetts.

Perrone died on November 26, 2011.
