= The Way of the Wiseguy =

- Author: Joseph D. Pistone
- Language: English
- Genre: True crime
- Publication date: 2004
- Publication place: United States

The Way of the Wiseguy, by Joseph D. Pistone (Running Press, ISBN 0-7624-1839-7), is a non-fiction description of Mafia personalities and culture, published in 2004. The author, Joseph D. Pistone, spent six years undercover for the FBI infiltrating New York organized crime.

== Synopsis ==
The book records psychological portraits of the personalities Pistone associated with during his years undercover. Among the many recurring themes in the book: wiseguys are not nice people, they do not have friends (not even people they have known and worked with their whole life), and they will beat or kill a person without hesitation.

Pistone relays experiences with international organized crime, as a consultant and undercover agent for Scotland Yard, and infiltrating a drug lord's operation in a foreign country.

An audio CD is included with the book, containing actual FBI surveillance recordings of Pistone, working undercover as Donnie Brasco, and the mobster who taught him about the Mafia.
