= Brian Tarantina =

American actor (1959–2019)

- Born: March 27, 1959; New York City, U.S.
- Died: November 2, 2019 (aged 60); New York City, U.S.
- Education: Fiorello H. LaGuardia High School
- Occupation: Actor
- Years active: 1980–2019
- Notable work: Uncle Buck; One Life to Live; The Marvelous Mrs. Maisel; Gilmore Girls; The Sopranos
- Children: 1

Brian Tarantina (March 27, 1959 – November 2, 2019) was an American stage, screen, and television character actor. He was known for his roles on such shows as One Life to Live, The Marvelous Mrs. Maisel, and Gilmore Girls.

== Early life ==
Tarantina was born in New York City on March 27, 1959, to father Frank William Tarantina and an unknown mother. He attended what is now the Fiorello H. LaGuardia High School of Music & Art and Performing Arts, where he then began to pursue an acting career.

== Death ==
Shortly after midnight on November 2, 2019, Tarantina was found unresponsive at his home in Hell's Kitchen, Manhattan, and was subsequently pronounced dead at the age of 60. At the time of his death, his publicist attributed the cause to "complications from a severe health crisis he experienced a few months [prior]." However, New York City Chief Medical Examiner report released in December 2019, stated that he died from an accidental overdose of fentanyl, heroin, cocaine and diazepam.

== Filmography ==
=== Film ===
Year	Title	Role	Notes
1984	The Cotton Club	Vince Hood	
1986	Resting Place	Sp4 Beyer	TV movie
1987	Critical Condition	Tommy Pinto	
1989	The January Man	Cone	
1989	Uncle Buck	E. Roger Coswell	
1989	Runaway Dreams	Jay Carver	
1989	Born on the Fourth of July	Vet #2	
1990	Jacob's Ladder	Doug	
1993	The Saint of Fort Washington	Fred	
1993	Carlito's Way	Speller	
1995	The Jerky Boys: The Movie	Geno	
1995	Sweet Nothing	Dee Dee	
1996	Bed of Roses	Randy	
1996	Vibrations	Tough Guy #2	Video
1996	The Associate	Eddie	
1997	Donnie Brasco	Anthony Indelicato	
1997	Firehouse	Hooded Man	TV movie
1998	Walking to the Waterline	Lucy 'Replacement'	
1998	Better Living	Danny	
1999	Roberta	Donald	
1999	Summer of Sam	Bobby Del Fiore	
1999	The Talented Mr. Ripley	Fighting Neighbor	
2000	The Photographer	Camera Salesman	
2002	Personal Velocity: Three Portraits	Pete Shunt	
2002	City by the Sea	Snake	
2003	The Introduction	Charlie	Short
2005	Duane Hopwood	Mr. Alonso	
2005	Trust the Man	Crazy Hair Driver	
2006	Unconscious	Morelli	
2006	A Crime	Joe	
2007	The Brave One	Gun Store Clerk	
2008	Ghost Town	Ghost Cop	
2009	Motherhood	Opera Lover in Car	
2010	Knight and Day	Scrap Yard Man	
2013	Resilience for Veterans I, II, III	-	Short
2014	Rob the Mob	Ronnie	
2014	Zarra's Law	Frankie Andreoli	
2014	Caseworker	Ducky	Short
2015	#Lucky Number	Blue Collar Mafia	
2018	BlacKkKlansman	Officer Clay Mulaney	
2018	Breaking Brooklyn	Randy Davis	
2018	Ask for Jane	Angry Doctor	
2019	The Kitchen	Burns	

=== Television ===
Year	Title	Role	Notes
1986	The Equalizer	Lenny DeWitt	Episode: "Wash Up"
1986	Sledge Hammer!	Blade	Episode: "To Sledge, with Love"
1987	Leg Work	George	Episode: "The Best Couple I Know"
1988	Miami Vice	Rickman	Episode: "Honor Among Thieves?"
1990	One Life to Live	Lucky Lippman	Regular Cast
1991	Law & Order	Corso	Episode: "Out of Control"
1994	New York Undercover	Eddie Dodge	Episode: "After Shakespeare"
1994	Law & Order	Rudy	Episode: "Old Friends"
1996	Spin City	First Homeless Man	Episode: "The Competition"
1997	Oz	Ronald Poklewaldt	Episode: "Straight Life"
1997	Homicide: Life on the Street	Scott Russell	Episode: "Blood Ties, Part 2"
1997	NYPD Blue	Darin Gammel	Episode: "Remembrance of Humps Past"
1999	Third Watch	James French	Episode: "Responsible Parties"
1999	Now and Again	Tommy Madden	Episode: "Pulp Turkey"
2000	ER	Joe Barkley	Episode: "Loose Ends"
2000–01	Deadline	Jimmy the Weasel	Recurring Cast
2001	The Sopranos	Mustang Sally	Episode: "Another Toothpick"
2001	Big Apple	Brick Top	Episode: "Follow the Blender"
2001	Law & Order	Al Manos	Episode: "Who Let the Dogs Out?"
2001	Crossing Jordan	Devlin Inmate Martinson	Episode: "The Ties That Bind"
2001–02	Gilmore Girls	Bootsy	Recurring Cast: Season 2
2002	Providence	Plumber	Episode: "The Wedding Planner"
2003	Queens Supreme	Bobby Saferas	Episode: "Things Change"
2004	The Jury	Joe Glapinski	Episode: "Mail Order Mystery"
2005	Jonny Zero	Stick	Episode: "Who's Your Daddy?"
2005	Law & Order: Trial by Jury	Officer Mike Bressler	Episode: "Blue Wall"
2005	Law & Order: Criminal Intent	Vic Dayton	Episode: "Prisoner"
2006	Heroes	Weasel	Recurring Cast: Season 1
2007	The Black Donnellys	Vinnie Culiari	Recurring Cast
2008	New Amsterdam	Mick	Episode: "Keep the Change"
2008	Law & Order: Special Victims Unit	Bill Jensen	Episode: "Cold"
2008	Fringe	Nice Guy	Episode: "The Ghost Network"
2009	Law & Order: Criminal Intent	Johnny Di Rogga	Episode: "Playing Dead"
2011	The Bay	Lucky	Episode: "Far from the Bay: Part 4"
2012	The Good Wife	Frankie Peel	Episode: "The Penalty Box"
2012	Elementary	Walsh	Episode: "One Way to Get Off"
2013	The Blacklist	The Courier's Brother	Episode: "The Courier (No. 85)"
2013	Person of Interest	Seamus Yorke	Episode: "The Devil's Share"
2016	The Night Of	Bar Patron	Episode: "The Art of War"
2016	Blue Bloods	Nick Polk	Episode: "For the Community"
2016	Gilmore Girls: A Year in the Life	Bootsy	Recurring Cast
2017	Madam Secretary	Motel Manager	Episode: "The Essentials"
2017–19	The Marvelous Mrs. Maisel	Jackie	Recurring Cast: Season 1–3
2018	Half Life	Jackie Randazo	Episode: "Pilot"

=== Video Games ===
Year	Title	Role
1996	Ripper	Addict
2008	Grand Theft Auto IV	The Crowd of Liberty City
2009	Grand Theft Auto IV: The Lost and Damned	Angus Martin

== Stage appearances ==
=== Off-Broadway ===
- Innocent Thoughts, Harmless Intentions (March 6, 1980 – March 30, 1980) - "Enzio 'Spats' Spadanti"
- Angels Fall (October 17, 1982 – November 28, 1982) – "Salvatore (Zappy) Zappala"
- Young Playwrights Festival (April 13, 1983 – May 1, 1983) – "Frank" (Third Street) / "TV Host" (The Birthday Present)
- Balm in Gilead (May 31, 1984 – January 6, 1985) - "David"
- V & V Only (May 25, 1988 – July 3, 1988) – "Donny"

=== Broadway ===
- Angels Fall (January 22, 1983 – March 13, 1983) – "Salvatore (Zappy) Zappala"
- Biloxi Blues (March 28, 1985 – June 28, 1986) – "Roy Selridge"
- The Boys of Winter (December 1, 1985 – December 8, 1985) – "Prick"
- Sacrilege (November 2, 1995 – November 19, 1995) – "Crackerjack"
