= Frank Lino =

American mobster

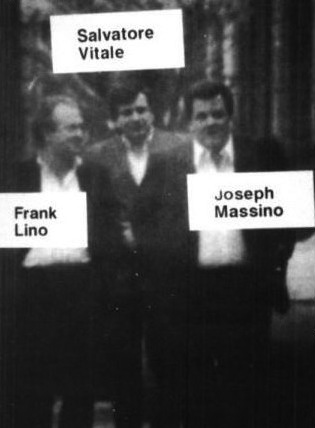
- FBI surveillance photo of Lino with Salvatore Vitale and Joseph Massino
- Born: October 30, 1938; New York City, U.S.
- Died: August 2, 2023 (aged 84)
- Other name: Curly
- Occupation: Mobster
- Children: 2
- Allegiance: Bonanno crime family

Frank "Curly" Lino (October 30, 1938 – August 2, 2023) was an American former caporegime in the Bonanno crime family who later became an informant.

== Biography ==
=== Early life ===
Lino was born in a house on West Eight Street in Gravesend, Brooklyn, New York City. The marriage of his mobster father Robert A. Lino, Sr. and his mother was arranged by Genovese crime family patriarch and founder Vito Genovese during the 1930s. Frank attended Brooklyn's Lafayette High School but dropped out in tenth grade. His father died in 1989, according to what Michael DiLeonardo said during testimony against John A. Gotti. Almost every male member of his family was involved in La Cosa Nostra.

After dropping out of high school in the 1950s he joined a violent street gang called the "Avenue U Boys". As a member of the "Avenue U Boys" Lino was involved in robberies. Lino first became associated with the La Cosa Nostra at the age of seventeen, and operated the local floating card games controlled by a Genovese crime family soldier. He was a close business associate of Rosario Gangi.

His cousin Edward Lino and brother Robert A. Lino, Jr. are both capos in the Gambino crime family. He is the father of successful New York City Wall Street stockbroker Michael, and father of Joseph, who became a made member of the Bonanno family. He is cousin-in-law to Grace Ann Scala-Lino, the sister of Gambino crime family capo Salvatore Scala and father of Colombo crime family mob associate Robert X. Grace Ann Lino was a customer of drug dealer Michael (Mikey Bear) Aiello. Frank was enraged over Aiello selling drugs to her and arranged for his murder, which he was supposed to witness, but the murder attempt was botched.

He is the father of two sons, one Joseph Lino born c. 1961 who became a made member of the Bonanno family and Michael Lino. He is a son-in-law to Genovese crime family mob associates Francis Consalvo and Carmine Consalvo and distant uncle to Louis Consalvo. He is a first cousin of Bonanno family capo Robert Lino, Sr. and a paternal uncle of Bonanno crime family capo Robert A. Lino, Jr. He is the godfather to Michael Lino and Frank Coppa, Jr., the sons of former Bonanno family capo and childhood friend Frank Coppa. He is a cousin-in-law to Gambino crime family capo Salvatore Scala. He is a close friend of the New York Mets pitcher John Franco and an avid baseball fan.

Lino was a no-show school bus driver for the Local 1181 of the Amalgamated Transit Union and employed by a mob-owned bus company Atlantic Express Transportation Corporation that was awarded contracts from the New York City Department of Education, located at 7 North Street in Port Richmond, Staten Island which is still in operation.

He became a made man of the Bonanno crime family on October 30, 1977, on Elizabeth Street in Little Italy, Manhattan at his capo Alphonse "Sonny Red" Indelicato's apartment. It was his 40th birthday. As he grew older Lino became more and more obese. He gained a tremendous amount of weight and began to suffer from high blood pressure. During his 40-year career in organized crime he was under the Genovese family in 1956, switched to the Colombo crime family in 1962 and switched to the Gambino family in 1969 before in 1977 his friend Frank Coppa helped him join the Bonanno crime family.

Lino and four other people including Jerry Rosenberg took part in the robbery of Borough Park Tobacco Company in Brooklyn on May 18, 1962. The robbery was unsuccessful and resulted in the death of two police officers, 56-year-old Detective Luke Joseph Fallon (who was an 26-year-veteran with the NYPD) and 29-year-old Detective John Patrick "Big" Finnegan (who was a seven-year veteran with the NYPD) from the 70th Detective Squad.

After undercover FBI agent Donnie Brasco had his assignment ended in July 1981, Dominick Napolitano, who was one of the men responsible for bringing him into the family, on August 17, 1981, Lino and Stefano Canone drove Napolitano to the house of Ronald Filocomo, a Bonanno family associate, for a meeting. Napolitano was greeted by Frank Coppa, then thrown down the stairs to the house's basement by Lino and shot to death. Napolitano's body was discovered the following year.

=== The three capos murder ===
Lino had done everything from selling illegal pornography to running pump and dump schemes on Wall Street. Over the years he had been a loanshark, bookmaker, drug trafficker and contract killer for which he took part in the gangland slayings of six men including his cousin's drug dealer Michael "The Bear" Aiello and the notorious murders of Bonanno captains Alphonse Indelicato, Dominick Trinchera and Philip Giaccone. On May 5, 1981, Massino loyalists shot and killed Giaccone, Trinchera, and Indelicato in a Brooklyn night club. On the pretext of working out a peace agreement, Massino had invited them to meet with him at the 20/20 Night Club in Clinton Hill, Brooklyn. However, Massino's real plan was to assassinate the capos. The ambush was set in the club store room, with Salvatore Vitale and three other gunmen wearing ski masks hiding in a closet. One of the gunmen was mobster Vito Rizzuto, who came from Montreal, Quebec, Canada with another Canadian mobster to help Massino. Massino told the men to avoid shooting so that bullets wouldn't spray around the room. Massino also brought drop cloths and ropes for disposing of the bodies afterwards.

When the capos arrived at the 20/20, Massino and Bonanno mobster Gerlando Sciascia and Lino escorted them to the store room. As the men entered the room, Sciascia brushed his hand through his hair, giving the prearranged signal. Vitale and gunmen rushed out of the closet, with Rizzuto yelling "it's a hold-up". Massino immediately punched Giaccone, knocking him to the floor, and also stopping Indelicato from escaping. Giaccone got up and tried to run out of the room, but was blocked up against a wall with Trinchera. The gunmen killed Giaccone with a volley of submachine gun fire. The three capos were unarmed, as was the rule when attending a peace meeting. Lino, who had escaped, was brought instead of Indelicato's son, but was quickly won over to Massino's side.

After the killings, the Bonanno gunmen transported the three bodies to a lot in Lindenwood, Queens, in an area known as The Hole.

The lot was a Gambino mob graveyard; Gambino crime family capo John Gotti arranged for his men to bury the bodies there as a favor to Massino. A few weeks later, on May 28, authorities discovered Indelicato's body and removed it from the lot.

In October 2004, after some children reported finding a body in the Lindenwood lot, FBI agents excavated the property and discovered the bodies of Giaccone and Trinchera. Among the personal items they unearthed was a Piaget watch that had belonged to Giaccone's wife. In December 2004, the bodies were positively identified as Giaccone and Trinchera.

On June 23, 2005, Massino, then a government witness to avoid the death penalty, pleaded guilty to several murders including those of Giaccone, Trinchera, and Indelicato. He received two life sentences in prison. On May 4, 2007, after being extradited to the United States, Rizzuto pleaded guilty in a Brooklyn court to reduced charges in the murder of three capos and was sentenced to ten years in state prison.

=== Informant ===
In September 1999, Lino began serving a 57-month sentence in prison. In 2003, Lino was arrested along with Massino, underboss Salvatore Vitale, and fellow capo Daniel Mongelli on a sweeping RICO indictment. A few days after the arrests, Vitale turned informer after learning that Massino had put a contract on him.

Vitale's decision to flip unnerved Lino. While he was charged with Sonny Black's murder, that charge was initially based solely on the word of former Bonanno soldier Frank Coppa. However, Vitale could not only corroborate Coppa's testimony, but could also implicate him in three other murders. Lino quickly realized that Vitale's testimony could potentially send him to prison for life. When the Bonanno defense team told Massino and Lino about Vitale's defection, Lino recalled thinking, "This meeting is a funeral and I'm dead." He secretly got word to prosecutors that he was willing to flip as well, though he feared Massino could order his children and grandchildren killed if word got out.

After 81 days in solitary confinement for his own protection, Lino formally agreed to become an informant. As part of the deal, he revealed everyone he knew was either a made man or an associate—including his own son. Lino's testimony implicated Massino in four homicides and featured the first full eyewitness account of the murder of the three captains.

Lino died in Witness Protection on August 2, 2023, aged 84.
