= Anthony Federici =

Alleged American mobster (1940–2022)

Anthony "Tough Tony" Federici (July 28, 1940 – November 9, 2022) was a Queens, New York City, resident who was long accused by law enforcement of being a member of the Genovese crime family. Federici was incorrectly identified in 1988 by the US Senate Permanent Subcommittee on Investigations as a Lucchese crime family soldier.

== Queens restaurant owner and businessman ==
Federici had a number of business and philanthropic interests in the Queens section of New York City. He was the owner of the Park Side Restaurant, a popular Italian restaurant in Corona, Queens. He later helped run a fundraiser that netted Flushing Hospital over $100,000 in donations. In the mid-1990s, Federici came under scrutiny during a New York State Senate investigation into corruption in the N.Y.C. District Council of Carpenters and the construction of the Jacob K. Javits Convention Center in Manhattan. During this investigation, Dominick Lavacca, the longtime president of the Queens-based local, confirmed that he was a close associate of Federici.

== Problems with police ==
On March 13, 2000, Federici was arrested on charges of menacing and criminal possession of a weapon after he was caught shooting at hawks from the roof of his restaurant. Federici explained to police that he was trying to protect his champion homing pigeons, which he kept in cages on the roof. Federici fired twice at the hawks using a 20-gauge shotgun.

On August 4, 2001, Federici's 19-year-old son Anthony Federici, Jr. was stabbed in a near fatal attack in a Queens nightclub. Nicholas Gambino and Thomas Muschio, reputed soldiers of the Gambino crime family, were charged with the crime. Gambino eventually pleaded guilty and received five years of probation. Muschio was acquitted at trial.

On January 26, 2004, Federici was arrested after police stopped his car in Queens and discovered he had a suspended driver's license, a set of brass knuckles, and six bullets. On June 23, 2004, Federici pleaded guilty to his first felony (possessing the brass knuckles and six bullets). He received a term of community service and a $700 fine.

== Later life ==
In February 2004, Queens Borough President Helen Marshall honored Federici for his service to the community. In attendance were many police officers from the 110th Precinct in Queens.

In 2005, Nassau County, New York, Judge David A. Gross, was charged with federal money laundering charges. The indictment was based on wiretap surveillance conducted at the Parkside, Federici's restaurant.

Federici died on November 9, 2022, from complications caused by leukemia.
