= Thomas J. Michie Jr. =

American attorney and politician (1931–2019)

Tom Michie
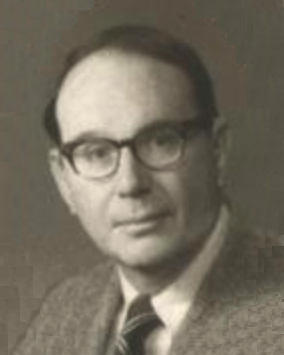

Member of the Virginia Senate from the 25th district
- In office November 24, 1980 – January 8, 1992
- Preceded by: J. Harry Michael Jr.
- Succeeded by: Edgar Robb

Member of the Virginia House of Delegates
- In office January 12, 1971 – November 24, 1980
- Preceded by: C. Armonde Paxson
- Succeeded by: Mitchell Van Yahres
- Constituency: 4th district (1971‍–‍1972); 26th district (1972‍–‍1980)

Personal details
- Born: Thomas Johnson Michie Jr. June 12, 1931 Pittsburgh, Pennsylvania, U.S.
- Died: August 27, 2019 (aged 88) Charlottesville, Virginia, U.S.
- Party: Democratic
- Spouses: Molly Ingle (m. 1955; died 1979); Janet Johnson (m. 1982)
- Education: Trinity College (BA); University of Virginia (LLB)

Thomas Johnson Michie Jr. (June 12, 1931 – August 27, 2019) was an American attorney and politician who served as a member of the Virginia House of Delegates and Virginia Senate. He was defeated for reelection in 1991 by Edgar Robb.
