= Edgar Robb =

American law enforcement officer & politician (born 1937)

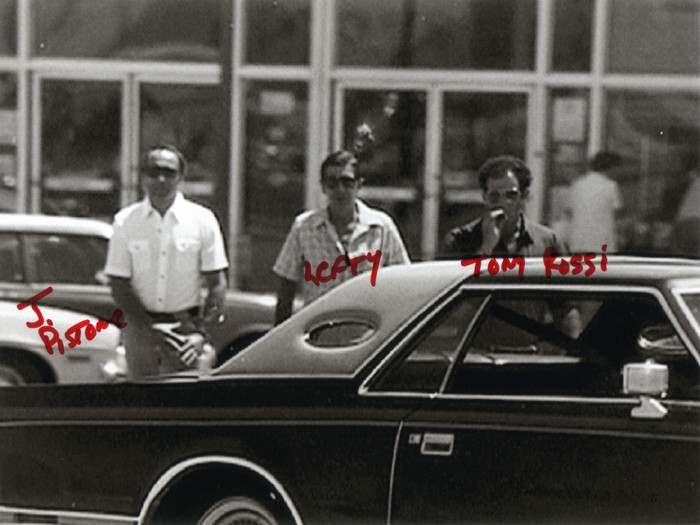
- An FBI surveillance photograph of Joseph D. Pistone (aka Donnie Brasco), Benjamin "Lefty" Ruggiero and Edgar Robb (aka Tony Rossi).

55th Sheriff of Albemarle County, Virginia
- In office January 1, 2000 – January 1, 2008
- Preceded by: Terry W. Hawkins
- Succeeded by: J. E. Harding

Member of the Virginia Senate from the 25th district
- In office January 8, 1992 – January 10, 1996
- Preceded by: Tom Michie
- Succeeded by: Emily Couric

Personal details
- Born: Edgar Straessley Robb; December 23, 1937 (age 88) Pittsburgh, Pennsylvania, U.S.
- Party: Republican
- Occupation: Federal Bureau of Investigation Special Agent (1969–1990)

Military service
- Allegiance: United States
- Branch/service: United States Army
- Years of service: 1962–1969
- Rank: Captain
- Battles/wars: Vietnam War

Edgar Straessley Robb (born December 23, 1937) is an American law enforcement officer and politician. As an FBI agent, he went undercover as Tony Rossi. As Tony Rossi, and alongside agent Joseph Pistone (Donnie Brasco), Robb infiltrated organized crime in Miami, Florida.

== Sources ==
- D. Lea Jacobs. Friend of the Family: An Undercover Agent in the Mafia, Howells House ISBN 0-929590-19-8
- Pistone, Joseph D.; & Woodley, Richard (1999) Donnie Brasco: My Undercover Life in the Mafia, Hodder & Stoughton. ISBN 0-340-66637-4.
- Pistone, Joseph D.; & Brandt, Charles (2007). Donnie Brasco: Unfinished Business, Running Press. ISBN 0-7624-2707-8.
- DeStefano, Anthony. The Last Godfather: Joey Massino & the Fall of the Bonanno Crime Family. California: Citadel, 2006.
