= Michael Sabella =

American mobster

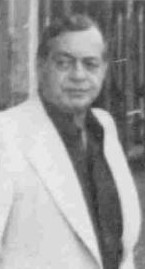
- FBI surveillance photo
- Born: 1911; New York City, U.S.
- Died: 1989 (aged 77–78)
- Other name: "Mikey Cigars"
- Occupation: Mobster
- Allegiance: Bonanno crime family

Michael "Mikey Cigars" Sabella (1911–1989) was an American mobster who was a caporegime in the Bonanno crime family of New York City and a relative of Philadelphia crime family boss Salvatore Sabella.

== Biography ==
=== Early years ===
Born in Little Italy, Manhattan to Sicilian parents from Castellammare del Golfo. He was a close relative of Castellammarese mobster Dominick "Mimi" Sabella and his brother, the early Philadelphia crime family boss Salvatore Sabella. Mike Sabella became a soldier for the Bonanno family serving under boss Joseph Bonanno in 1957. He was involved in gambling and loansharking during the 1950s.

Before the Bonanno wars of the 1960s, Sabella had been a soldier first in the crew of fellow Castellammarese Carmine Galante and later under Joe Notaro, both top Joe Bonanno loyalists. During the conflict between the Bonannos and Gaspar DiGregorio, Mike Sabella initially remained loyal to the Bonanno faction, but eventually the Commission convinced him to join DiGregorio's group. As a result, he was rewarded with a promotion to capo of his old crew.

Sabella worked closely with Nicholas Marangello, Galante's underboss, and became a close confidant to his former captain Carmine Galante, who by the mid-1970s had become the street boss of the organization. Sabella's crew was among the largest in the family, with interests stretching from Manhattan and New Jersey area down to Florida.

He was the father of two sons; Arthur Sabella, who was born c. 1957, and Steven Sabella, who was born c. 1966, who is estranged from his family. During the 1970s, Sabella became the owner of CaSa Bella, an upscale restaurant in Little Italy that served as his primary meeting place.

=== Donnie Brasco ===
FBI agent Joseph D. Pistone was undercover in the Bonanno family under the name "Donnie Brasco"; a supposed jewel thief expert and Mafia associate. Pistone soon began working with several of the "made men" who worked for Sabella's crew, such as Anthony Mirra and Benjamin "Lefty Guns" Ruggiero. After the takeover of Dominick "Sonny Black" Napolitano, Brasco continued to work with the crew. Before the Donnie Brasco Operation was ended, Pistone was proposed to become a "made" member of the family. After the disclosure of Pistone as a federal agent working undercover, Sabella was indicted with Frank Balistrieri, boss of the Milwaukee crime family, but was cleared of all charges.

=== Later years ===
After the murder of Carmine Galante in 1979, Sabella and several other Bonanno leaders were demoted as a result of their close association with Galante while he was street boss. Sabella was replaced as capo by his former underling Dominick Napolitano. After the assassination of the three captains; Alphonse Indelicato, Dominick Trinchera, and Philip Giaccone, Sabella decided to sell his restaurant and remained a low-level figure throughout the 1980s. It is said that he had over 1 million dollars on the street as loan shark money. His successor, Napolitano, would later be brutally murdered, probably as a result of his close association with "Donnie Brasco"—he was called to a meeting 17 days after Pistone left his undercover role and his body was discovered as related mob trials began. However, former mob boss Joe Massino testified that Napolitano was killed for trying to take over the family. Sabella was acquitted in Milwaukee and died from complications from diabetes in 1989. He was 79 years old.
