= Donnie Brasco (film) =

1997 film directed by Mike Newell

- Theatrical release poster
- Directed by: Mike Newell
- Screenplay by: Paul Attanasio
- Based on: Donnie Brasco: My Undercover Life in the Mafia (1988 book) by Joseph D. Pistone; Richard Woodley
- Produced by: Mark Johnson; Barry Levinson; Louis DiGiaimo; Gail Mutrux
- Starring: Al Pacino; Johnny Depp; Michael Madsen; Bruno Kirby; James Russo; Anne Heche
- Cinematography: Peter Sova
- Edited by: Jon Gregory
- Music by: Patrick Doyle
- Production companies: TriStar Pictures; Mandalay Entertainment; Baltimore Pictures; Mark Johnson Productions
- Distributed by: Sony Pictures Releasing
- Release dates: February 24, 1997 (Century City premiere); February 28, 1997 (U.S.)
- Running time: 126 minutes
- Country: United States
- Language: English
- Budget: $35 million
- Box office: $124.9 million

Donnie Brasco is a 1997 American biographical crime drama film directed by Mike Newell and starring Al Pacino and Johnny Depp. Michael Madsen, Bruno Kirby, James Russo, and Anne Heche also feature in supporting roles. The film, written by Paul Attanasio, is based on the 1988 memoir of Joseph D. Pistone.

The film is based on the true story of Pistone (Depp), an undercover FBI agent who infiltrated the Bonanno crime family in New York City during the 1970s, under the alias Donnie Brasco, a jewel thief from Vero Beach, Florida. Brasco maneuvers his way into the confidence of an aging Mafia hitman, Lefty Ruggiero (Pacino), who vouches for him. As Donnie moves deeper into the Mafia, he realizes that not only is he crossing the line between federal agent and criminal, but also leading his friend Lefty to an almost certain death.

Donnie Brasco premiered in Century City on February 24, 1997 and was released on February 28, 1997, by Sony Pictures Releasing. The film was a box-office success, earning $124.9 million against its $35 million budget, and received positive reviews from critics. The film was nominated for Best Adapted Screenplay at the 70th Academy Awards.

== Plot ==
In 1978 New York City, Lefty Ruggiero, an aging enforcer in the Bonanno crime family, meets Joseph D. Pistone, a young undercover FBI agent posing as jewel thief Donnie Brasco. Donnie insists that a diamond that Lefty has acquired from strip club owner Pandar is fake; when the two confront Pandar, Donnie beats him up and takes his car as repayment.

Lefty teaches Donnie the rules of the Mafia and introduces him to members of his crew, including Sonny Black, Nicky Santora, Paulie and rival crew leader Sonny Red. After the boss of the Bonanno family is killed, Sonny Black is promoted to lead the crew; Lefty resents the decision, believing that his years of service make him more deserving. As the crew runs a series of successful shakedowns and hijackings in the city, Pistone exploits his position as an associate in Lefty's crew to gather information for the FBI via wiretap recordings. He also forms a genuine bond with Lefty, who is struggling with family issues, a lifetime of debt and his perception of underappreciation in the crew.

Pistone is asked by his FBI supervisor Tim Curley to incorporate Miami-based undercover FBI Agent Richie Gazzo into the Donnie Brasco operation. He persuades Lefty to meet with Richie and set up an illegal gambling racket in a long-closed tavern that he owns. Lefty hopes to impress local mob boss Santo Trafficante Jr. by throwing a yacht party and persuading him to support his new business.

Sonny Black finds out about Lefty's plan and intercedes by ingratiating himself to Trafficante and officially taking Donnie under his wing. Lefty believes that Donnie has betrayed him and cuts ties with him until Lefty's son Tommy nearly dies of a drug overdose and Donnie is the only one who comes to comfort him. Pistone's marriage with his wife Maggie continues to worsen due to long absences while undercover, leaving her alone to look after their three daughters. Pistone's behavior increasingly becomes more like that of the criminal who he pretends to be, even hitting Maggie when she argues with him.

On its opening day, Sonny Black's club is raided by corrupt Miami Police officers on Trafficante's payroll as a favor to Sonny Red. Suspecting a setup, Sonny Black and his crew return to New York and gun down Sonny Red and two other mobsters, Philip "Philly Lucky" Giaccone and Dominick "Big Trin" Trinchera, in an ambush. Lefty kills Nicky afterward for lying about a drug deal and because Sonny Black suspected that he snitched on the crew in Florida. Donnie is brought in to help clean up and dispose of the bodies.

Sonny Black becomes the new boss and Lefty orders Donnie to kill Sonny Red's son Bruno so that Donnie can officially become a member of their family. As Lefty and Donnie stake out Bruno's hiding place, Donnie tries to offer money to Lefty to leave the Mafia but Lefty begins questioning his loyalty at gunpoint. Before they can kill Bruno, the FBI arrests them both (to protect Donnie's cover) and ends the investigation.

FBI agents visit Sonny Black's hangout and reveal Donnie's true identity to the crew. When Lefty is called to a meeting with his crew, he puts his valuables away for his girlfriend Annette to find, knowing that he will be killed for letting an FBI agent infiltrate the Bonanno family. In a small private ceremony, Pistone receives a medal and a reward check of $500 for his service and Maggie asks him to come home afterward. A postscript says that the evidence collected by Pistone in the Donnie Brasco operation led to over 200 indictments and over 100 convictions. Pistone lives with Maggie under an assumed name in an undisclosed location, with a $500,000 open contract on his head.

== Cast ==
- Al Pacino as Benjamin "Lefty" Ruggiero
- Johnny Depp as FBI Agent Joseph D. Pistone / Donnie Brasco
- Michael Madsen as Dominick "Sonny Black" Napolitano
- Bruno Kirby as Nicky Santora
- James Russo as Paulie
- Anne Heche as Maggie Pistone
- Željko Ivanek as FBI Agent Tim Curley
- Gerry Becker as FBI Agent Dean Blandford
- Zach Grenier as Dr. Berger
- Brian Tarantina as Anthony "Bruno" Indelicato
- Robert Miano as Al "Sonny Red" Indelicato
- Rocco Sisto as FBI Agent Richie Gazzo
- Walt MacPherson as Sheriff
- Ronnie Farer as Annette
- Terry Serpico as Pandar
- Gretchen Mol as Sonny's Girlfriend
- Tony Lip as Philip "Philly Lucky" Giaccone
- George Angelica as Dominick "Big Trin" Trinchera
- Val Avery as Santo Trafficante Jr.
- Madison Arnold as Angelo "Jilly" Greca
- Katie Sagona as Kerry Pistone
- Larry Romano as Tommy Ruggiero
- Tim Blake Nelson as FBI Technician
- Paul Giamatti as FBI Technician
- Andrew Parks as Hollman
- Sal Jenco as Bartender
- Denise Faye as Girlfriend
- Sandy B as Singer
- Frank Pesce and Randy Jurgensen as Wiseguys

== Production ==
When Joseph D. Pistone's book Donnie Brasco: My Undercover Life in the Mafia was published in 1988, Louis DiGiaimo, a casting director for Barry Levinson and childhood acquaintance of Pistone, served as a consultant for the book and bought the film rights. DiGiaimo brought it to Levinson's Baltimore Pictures, as well as producers Mark Johnson and Gail Mutrux, who turned to Paul Attanasio to write the script.

Stephen Frears was initially hired as the director for the film, but when Goodfellas, another mob film, was released in 1990, the plans for the film were pushed back. Frears was adamant about casting Al Pacino to play Lefty Ruggiero. After several years of development hell, Frears was eventually replaced with Mike Newell as director and development finally picked up in 1995 to begin production in February for a planned end-of-year 1996 release. Pacino and Johnny Depp were ultimately cast in the co-starring roles and Pistone was hired as a consultant to help them develop their characters.

== Release ==
Donnie Brasco premiered in Century City, California, on February 24, 1997. It was given a wide release in North America on February 28, 1997. It was released in the United Kingdom on May 2, 1997.

=== Home media ===
Donnie Brasco was released on DVD in October 2000 as a Special Edition with bonus materials, such as commentary tracks. In January 2006, Donnie Brasco was released as part of a DVD box set with the films Snatch, Bugsy and The American Gangster. In May 2007, Donnie Brasco was released on Blu-ray with an extended cut.

== Reception ==
=== Box office ===
Donnie Brasco was released theatrically in North America on February 28, 1997. The film earned $11.6 million from 1,503 theaters during its opening weekend. It went on to earn $41.9 million in North America, and $83 million from other markets, for a total of $124.9 million.

=== Critical response ===
On review aggregator website Rotten Tomatoes, Donnie Brasco has an approval rating of 88% based on 57 reviews, with an average rating of 8.00/10. The site's critical consensus reads: "A stark, nuanced portrait of life in organized crime, bolstered by strong performances from Al Pacino and Johnny Depp." Metacritic, which assigns a weighted average, rates the film a 77 out of 100, based on 21 critics, and reports that the film has "generally favorable" reviews. Audiences polled by CinemaScore gave the film an average grade of "B+" on a scale of A+ to F.

Janet Maslin of The New York Times called it "a sharp, clever encounter, overturning all manner of genre cliches and viewer expectations... and the best crime movie in a long while, is full of similar surprises as it leads Mr. Pacino and Johnny Depp through a fine-tuned tale of deception." Entertainment Weekly called it a "wonderfully dense, clever, and moving gangland thriller", and gave it an A−, also praising Attanasio's screenplay as "a rich, satisfying gumbo of back stabbing, shady business maneuvers, and mayhem".

Siskel and Ebert gave Donnie Brasco "two thumbs up" on their syndicated television series At the Movies. In his print review, Roger Ebert of the Chicago Sun-Times gave it three-and-a-half stars out of four. He wrote that "the film had one of Pacino's best performances", and that Donnie Brasco was rare in depicting "two men who grow to love each other, within the framework of a teacher-student relationship". Peter Travers of Rolling Stone praised the film, saying that "Donnie Brasco is one terrific movie". Mick LaSalle of the San Francisco Chronicle gave the film a positive review and said that Donnie Brasco was "a first class Mafia thriller".

Critics especially praised Depp's performance. A Salon.com review hailed Depp's performance as "sensational". New York magazine called Depp "graceful" and found his acting highly believable. "We can believe that the mob might take him for a tough, ambitious young hood—he has the wariness and the self-confidence that creates an aura." According to Charles Taylor in his review for Salon.com, both Pacino and Depp are "in top form"; in remarking on Pacino's frequent collaborations with younger actors (Sean Penn, John Cusack), Taylor called Donnie Brasco "the best in this series of duets" and singled out Pacino's skills: "His final scene is all the more heartbreaking for the economy of gesture and feeling he brings it. It's an exit that does justice to both the actor and the role, and it leaves an ache in the movie."

Entertainment Weekly reserved its highest praise for Pacino: "If Donnie Brasco belongs to any actor, though, it's Al Pacino." The Playlist called it one of Pacino's best performances, writing, "Though Scent of a Woman, Two Bits and even (relatively) Heat showcased Pacino at his most exuberantly grandiose, Brasco brings him back to a performance of stealth and nuance."

=== Accolades ===
Institution	Year	Category	Nominee	Result
Academy Awards	1998	Best Adapted Screenplay	Paul Attanasio	Nominated
Boston Society of Film Critics	1997	Best Film		Nominated
Boston Society of Film Critics	1997	Best Director	Mike Newell	Nominated
Boston Society of Film Critics	1997	Best Actor	Al Pacino	Won
Chicago Film Critics Association	1998	Best Actor	Al Pacino	Nominated
Critics' Choice Awards	1998	Best Picture		Nominated
Edgar Awards	1998	Best Motion Picture Screenplay	Paul Attanasio	Nominated
National Board of Review	1997	Best Supporting Actress	Anne Heche	Won
National Society of Film Critics	1998	Best Actor	Al Pacino	3rd place
USC Scripter Award	1998	—N/a	Paul Attanasio, Joseph D. Pistone, Richard Woodley	Nominated
Writers Guild of America	1998	Best Adapted Screenplay	Paul Attanasio	Nominated

== See also ==
- List of American films of 1997
