= Park Side Restaurant =

Italian-American Restaurant in Queens, New York

Park Side
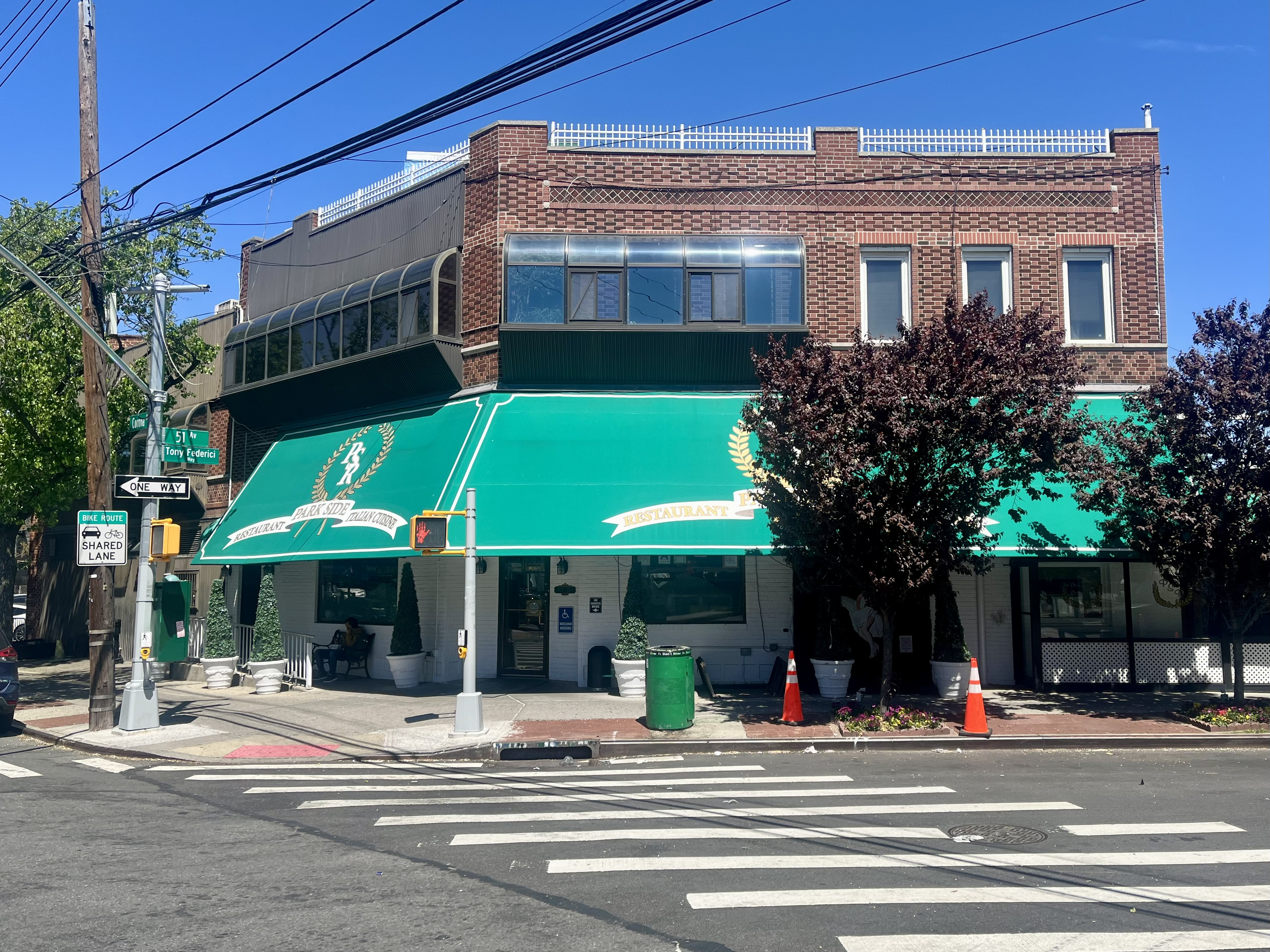
- The restaurant's exterior in 2025
- Interactive map of Park Side

Restaurant information
- Established: 1980
- Previous owner: Anthony Federici (died 2022)
- Food type: Italian
- Location: 107-01 Corona Avenue, Corona, Queens, New York, 11368
- Coordinates: 40°44′38″N 73°51′22″W
- Website: www.parksiderestaurantny.com

Park Side Restaurant is an Italian-American restaurant in the Corona neighborhood of the New York City borough of Queens. Founded by Anthony "Tough Tony" Federici in 1980, it was originally opened by his parents in 1960 as the Corona Supper Club. Park Side Restaurant specializes in southern Italian and Sicilian cuisine.

Federici, allegedly a capo in the Genovese crime family, kept racing pigeons on the roof.

On March 13, 2000 Federici was shooting at hawks twice with a 20 gauge shotgun off of the roof, but he didn’t hit any. He was arrested on charges of menacing and criminal weapons possession.

Celebrity customers include Johnny Depp and Robert De Niro.
