= Bamonte's =

Restaurant in Brooklyn, New York

Bamonte’s
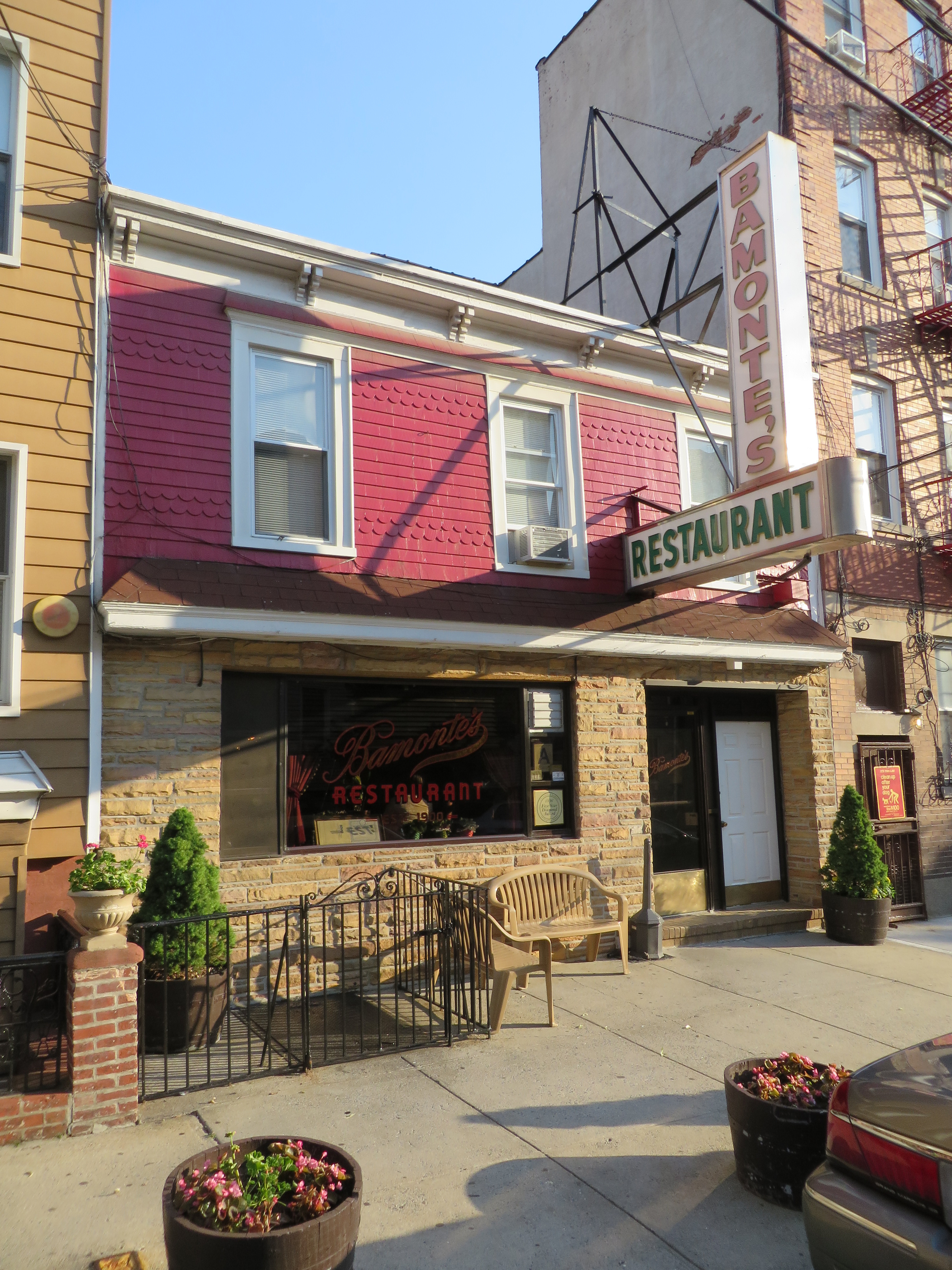
- Bamonte’s Restaurant, Brooklyn, NY
- Interactive map of Bamonte’s

Restaurant information
- Established: 1900
- Food type: Italian-American
- Location: 32 Withers Street, Brooklyn, Kings, New York, 11211, USA
- Coordinates: 40°43′0″N 73°57′4.5″W
- Reservations: yes

Bamonte's is a family owned Italian-American restaurant at 32 Withers Street in Williamsburg, Brooklyn, New York. Anthony Bamonte took ownership in the late 1960s and is still owner to this day. The restaurant is, as of 2026, being operated by Anthony Bamonte alongside his three daughters, Lisa, Laura and Nicole.

It is said to have been a Mob hangout. In 2009, after he was released from a federal penitentiary, Anthony "Fat Tony" Rabito of the Bonanno crime family, was forbidden by his probation officer from returning to several Italian restaurants in Brooklyn, Queens and Manhattan, including Bamonte's.

== History ==
When Anthony's grandfather, Pasquale Bamonte, and his wife settled in Williamsburg after immigrating from Salerno, Italy they opened Liberty Hall in 1900, which became Bamonte's. It originally served as a banquet hall and meeting place.

== Honors and awards ==
In 2021, Bamonte's was named one of NYC's 21 best Italian restaurants by Condé Nast Traveler.

== In popular culture ==
- Bamonte's appears in the MGM+ series Godfather of Harlem. Considered the “working office" of the Italian mafia bosses, leaders of the Five Families held important meetings there, settled disputes, entered into agreements and often included the Godfather of Harlem, Bumpy Johnson in those meetings.
- Bamonte's was featured in Season 5 of Starz T.V. show Power as a mob hangout for Vincent Ragni's crew.
- Bamonte's is a setting in several episodes of The Sopranos. In "Stage 5", Lupertazzi capo Gerry Torciano is murdered by assassins working for Doc Santoro while having dinner with Silvio Dante.
- Episodes of Person of Interest and Kojak also filmed here
- An episode in Season 6 of Homeland was filmed here
- 1989 mobster film Cookie
- Blue Bloods Season 11, Episode 14 The New You
- Blue Bloods Season 14, Episode 4 Past is Present
- In the Daredevil: Born Again episode "Art for Art's Sake," a mob boss named Luca attempts to assassinate Wilson Fisk while he is having dinner alone at Bamonte's, but is shot dead by Fisk's bodyguard Buck Cashman.
