= Dominick Napolitano =

American mobster (1930–1981)

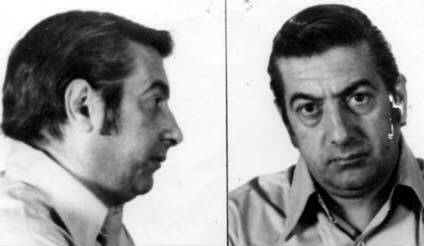
- Napolitano c. 1980
- Born: June 16, 1930; New York City, U.S.
- Disappeared: August 17, 1981
- Died: August 17, 1981 (aged 51); New York City, U.S.
- Cause of death: Gunshot Wound
- Body discovered: August 12, 1982; Arlington, Staten Island, U.S.
- Other name: Sonny Black
- Occupation: Mobster
- Allegiance: Bonanno crime family

Dominick Napolitano (June 16, 1930 – August 17, 1981), also known as Sonny Black, was an American Mafia caporegime in the Bonanno crime family. He is known for unwittingly allowing FBI agent Joseph D. Pistone to become an associate in his crew and nearly having him become an inducted member of the family and Cosa Nostra.

== Early life ==
Napolitano's grandparents were immigrants from Naples, Italy. Napolitano was born with blond hair, but by his forties it had turned a gunmetal white-silver color. To hide the color, he dyed it black, earning him the nickname "Sonny Black".

He was a close friend of future Bonanno crime family boss Joseph Massino; incarcerated boss Philip Rastelli knew Napolitano before he went to prison. He was close to Carmine Napolitano (May 30, 1943 – February 15, 1999), a cousin and fellow Bonanno mobster. Like his sons Peter Napolitano (November 17, 1957 – June 29, 1994), Aniello Napolitano and Rocco Napolitano who were born and raised in Williamsburg, Brooklyn; he was also raised there.

Napolitano controlled Williamsburg, Brooklyn, and from 1979 to 1980, he operated in Pasco County, Florida, and from Holiday, Florida, after negotiating control of the territory with Santo Trafficante, Jr. At that time, Napolitano set his sights on operating a major bookmaking operation in Orlando.

== Caporegime ==
Napolitano rose to prominence in 1973 as a soldier for Michael Sabella and was promoted to capo, replacing his mentor after the gangland execution of the powerful rival capo Carmine "The Cigar" Galante. Sabella was demoted and Napolitano took over the crew. He became a trusted confidant of the imprisoned mobster Phillip "Rusty" Rastelli who took over leadership permanently again. But when Rastelli took over, it caused the Bonannos to split into two factions, one loyal to Rastelli, the other attempting to overthrow him in favor of the Sicilian faction, led by Alphonse "Sonny Red" Indelicato.

Napolitano owned the Wither's Italian-American Veterans of Foreign Wars Club at 415 Graham Avenue in Williamsburg, Brooklyn, and also The Motion Lounge at 420 Graham Avenue. He later ran an illegal casino in Pasco County, Florida, and owned a tennis club and night club called The King's Court Bottle Club in Holiday, Florida.

Napolitano's headquarters were in the heart of Williamsburg's Italian neighborhood. His crew, involved in burglary, extortion, robbery, bank robbery, loansharking, hijacking, bookmaking, casino operations and drug trafficking, were one of the most successful crews in the Bonanno family. Napolitano's crew included Bonanno street soldiers Benjamin "Lefty" Ruggiero, Nicholas Santora, Louis Attanasio, John Cersani, Jerome Asaro, Anthony Francomano, Sandro Asaro, John Faraci, Daniel Mangelli, Robert Lino, Frank Lino, Richard Riccardi, Joseph Grimaldi, Nicholas Accardi, Peter Rosa, Patrick DeFilippo, Michael Mancuso, Vito Grimaldi, Anthony Urso, James Tartaglione, Joseph Cammarano, John Zancocchio, Edward Barberra, Frankie Fish, Bobby Badheart, Bobby Smash and his previous capo Michael Sabella, Joseph Puma, Steven Maruca, Salvatore Farrugia, Anthony Pesiri, Antonio Tomasulo, Anthony Rabito, Raymond Wean, Frank DiStefano, Salvatore D'Ottavio, James Episcopa and Donnie Brasco.

== Operation Donnie Brasco ==
Napolitano assigned associate Donnie Brasco in September 1981, whom he hoped to make a made man, to kill Bruno Indelicato, who had previously evaded death when he missed the meeting when the three capos were killed in May 1981. "Brasco", however, was an undercover FBI agent named Joseph Pistone; shortly after the hit was ordered, Pistone's assignment was ended, and Napolitano was informed of their infiltration.

In 1981, Napolitano and Joseph Massino, who were loyal to Rastelli, were chiefly responsible for helping to end the struggle by killing three capos opposed to Rastelli: Alphonse Indelicato, Dominick Trinchera and Philip Giaccone. Already skeptical of Napolitano's support of "Brasco", Massino was deeply disturbed by the breach of security when he learned of the agent's true identity. Salvatore Vitale would later testify that this was the reason Massino decided to murder Napolitano as well; as he would later quote Massino, "I have to give him a receipt for the Donnie Brasco situation."

== Death ==
On August 17, 1981, Napolitano was summoned to a meeting in Bonanno associate Ron Filocomo's home in Eltingville, Staten Island, which was the home of Filocomo's parents. Anticipating that he would be killed, Napolitano gave his jewelry to his favorite bartender, who worked below his apartment at the Motion Lounge, along with the keys to his apartment so that his pet pigeons could be cared for.

Bonanno capo Frank Lino and Steven Canone drove Napolitano to the Filocomo's house. The three men were greeted at the door by Frank Coppa, who told them the conference was to be held in the basement. As Napolitano descended the basement stairs, Coppa slammed the basement door shut, signaling for Lino to shove Napolitano down the stairs where two killers – Robert Lino Sr. (Frank Lino's cousin) and Filocomo – were waiting at the foot of the stairwell. Napolitano was pushed down the staircase and was shot and grazed by Lino Sr. When his gun failed to fire a subsequent shot, Napolitano told them "Hit me one more time and make it good", to which Filocomo responded by firing several .38 caliber rounds, killing him.

Napolitano's girlfriend, Judy, later contacted Pistone and told him that, shortly before his death, Napolitano had told her that he bore no ill will towards Pistone, knowing that Pistone was only doing his job, and that if anyone was responsible for taking him down, he was glad it was Pistone. She said that Napolitano really loved Pistone and was upset when he found out he was an agent. Napolitano could not believe that Pistone was an agent because of the "things we had done together, the conversations we'd had, the feelings we'd had."

In August, FBI surveillance noticed workmen dismantling Napolitano's pigeon coops atop the Motion Lounge. On August 12, 1982, a body was found at South Avenue and Bridge Street in Arlington, Staten Island; the corpse's hands were severed and the face was so badly decomposed that dental records were required to verify the identity. The FBI announced that it had found the corpse of Napolitano.

In 2003, Bonanno boss Joseph Massino was arrested and charged with a variety of crimes, with the case centering on the murder of Napolitano. At Massino's trial, prosecutors claimed that Napolitano was killed by his associates for allowing his crew to be compromised, and that his hands had been removed as a warning to other mobsters to follow the rule about proper introductions (the implication being the association between shaking hands and being introduced to someone). Massino was convicted in 2004 and sentenced to life imprisonment.

In 2006, Frank Lino and Frank Coppa became informants, providing authorities with the details of Napolitano's murder. Although the FBI was reasonably sure that the body found in Staten Island was Napolitano's, one discrepancy existed: Lino claimed that he and Filocomo shot Napolitano with .38 caliber revolvers and that he himself had fired more than once. But the corpse had only one bullet wound, apparently made by a .45 caliber pistol. Coppa later said that Napolitano "died like a man". Napolitano was buried in Calvary Cemetery, Queens. About Napolitano's fate, Pistone had stated, "My intention in all of this was to put people in jail, not get them killed", and that he was sorry for Napolitano's murder.

== In popular culture ==
- In the 1997 film Donnie Brasco, Dominick Napolitano was portrayed by Michael Madsen.

== See also ==
- List of solved missing person cases: 1950–1999
