= Anthony Indelicato =

American mobster

- Born: March 4, 1947 (age 79); New York City, U.S.
- Other names: "Bruno" "Whack-Whack"
- Occupation: Mobster
- Parent: Alphonse Indelicato
- Relatives: Jimmy Burke (father-in-law)
- Allegiance: Bonanno crime family
- Convictions: Murder (1986); Murder (2008)
- Penalty: 40 years' imprisonment and fined $50,000 (1987); 20 years' imprisonment (2008)

Anthony Indelicato (born March 4, 1947), also known as "Bruno" and "Whack-Whack", is an American mobster and consigliere of the Bonanno crime family of New York City. In November 1987, Indelicato was sentenced to 40 years in prison and fined $50,000 for participating in the July 1979 murder of Carmine Galante. He was released in 1998. In December 2008, Indelicato was sentenced to 20 years in prison for participating in the February 2001 murder of Bonanno associate Frank Santoro. Indelicato served 14 years of this sentence. Upon release, Indelicato was welcomed back into the fold of Bonanno family affairs and was appointed as the new and current consigliere of the Bonanno family around 2023.

In 1981, his father, Bonanno family capo Alphonse "Sonny Red" Indelicato and two other captains, attempted an overthrow of Bonanno family boss Philip Rastelli and were murdered. The murder of his father was depicted in the 1996 film Donnie Brasco portrayed by Robert Miano, alongside Michael Madsen, Al Pacino and Johnny Depp, Indelicato himself was portrayed by Brian Tarantina.

== Early life ==
Anthony Indelicato is the son of Alphonse "Sonny Red" Indelicato, a powerful capo in the Bonanno family. Anthony Indelicato's wife is Catherine Burke, a daughter of Lucchese crime family associate Jimmy Burke.

In 1979, Anthony Indelicato participated in the murder of Bonanno boss Carmine Galante. With the official Bonanno boss Philip Rastelli in prison, Galante had taken effective control of the family in the early 1970s. His ruthlessness and ambition created many enemies within the Bonanno family and in the other New York families.

The Mafia Commission finally allowed several Bonanno capos to plot Galante's assassination. On July 12, 1979, Galante entered Joe and Mary's Italian-American Restaurant in Bushwick, Brooklyn, for lunch. Three gunmen murdered Galante at his table as he was eating lunch on the patio of the restaurant. Two other men who were sitting with him were killed as well. As a reward for his involvement in killing Galante, Indelicato was promoted to capo.

== Three capos murder ==
After Galante's murder, a power struggle erupted between two factions of the Bonanno family. One faction included capos Dominick Napolitano and Joseph Massino, who were loyal to Rastelli. The second faction, which included Indelicato's father Alphonse, Philip Giaccone and Dominick Trinchera, wanted to murder the leaders of the Massino faction and assume power for themselves. After receiving permission from the Mafia Commission, Massino set up a plot to murder the rival captains first.

Napolitano later contacted Donnie Brasco, whom he hoped to make a made man, to murder Indelicato, who had previously evaded death after missing a meeting that left his father, Giaccone, and Trinchera dead on May 5, 1981. Frank Lino, who Indelicato's father brought to the meeting instead and escaped the massacre, was quickly won over to Massino's side. Brasco, however, was actually an undercover FBI agent named Joseph Pistone; shortly after the hit was ordered, Pistone's assignment was ended and Napolitano was informed of their infiltration.

== Mafia Commission Trial and prison ==
On November 19, 1986, Indelicato was convicted of the 1979 Galante murder during the historic Mafia Commission Trial. On January 13, 1987, he was sentenced to 40 years in prison and fined $50,000. Soon after being sent to prison in Lewisburg, Pennsylvania, Indelicato met Catherine Burke while she was visiting her incarcerated friend John Carneglia. In 1992, Indelicato and Catherine Burke were married at the federal prison in Terre Haute, Indiana. In 1998, Indelicato was released from prison on parole.

== Santoro murder ==
In 2001, Indelicato participated in the murder of Bonanno associate Frank Santoro, who had threatened to kidnap one of the sons of then Bonanno capo, Vincent "Vinny Gorgeous" Basciano. In July 2001, Indelicato was arrested for parole violations after he was videotaped and photographed by investigators associating with men including Basciano. In February 2006, Indelicato was charged with murder and racketeering for the 2001 Santoro murder. In August 2008, Indelicato pleaded guilty to murder, and on December 16, 2008, was sentenced to 20 years in federal prison. Indelicato was imprisoned at the Federal Correctional Institution, Danbury. He was released on May 20, 2022.

== In popular culture ==
- In the 1997 film Donnie Brasco, Anthony Indelicato was portrayed by Brian Tarantina.
