= Lefty Ruggiero =

American mobster (1926–1994)

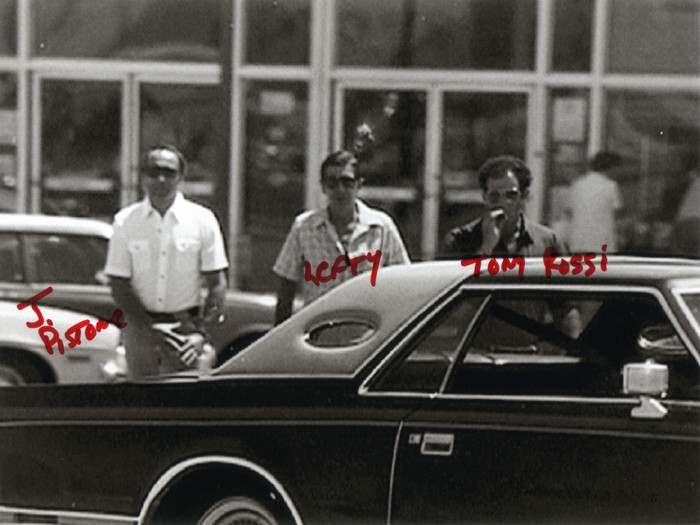
- FBI surveillance photo of Lefty Ruggiero (center) c. 1980
- Born: Benjamin Ruggiero; April 19, 1926; New York City, U.S.
- Died: November 24, 1994 (aged 68) (Note: November 24, 1994, is the most commonly cited death date, although some sources state 1995.); New York City, U.S.
- Other names: "Lefty", "Lefty Guns", "Mister Violence", "Hefty Lefty", and "Lefty Two Guns"
- Occupation: Mobster
- Allegiance: Bonanno crime family
- Conviction: Racketeering conspiracy (1982)
- Penalty: 15 years' imprisonment

Benjamin "Lefty" Ruggiero (April 19, 1926 – November 24, 1994) was an American mobster in the Bonanno crime family. He is well known for his friendship and mentorship of FBI undercover agent Joseph D. Pistone, whom Ruggiero knew as Donnie Brasco. When Pistone's operation was ended on July 26, 1981, the FBI intercepted and arrested Ruggiero on August 29, 1981. In November 1982, Ruggiero was sentenced to 15 years in prison for racketeering conspiracy; he was released in April 1993 before his death from cancer.

== Life ==
=== Early life ===
Ruggiero was born on April 19, 1926, in Hell's Kitchen, Manhattan, and grew up in the Knickerbocker Village private housing development in the Two Bridges of Manhattan. His father, Fiori Ruggiero, worked as a truck driver, and his mother, Frances, was a housewife. Ruggiero had two younger siblings named Dominick and Angelina. Ruggiero joined the Bonanno family organization as a young man, serving as a street soldier under caporegime Michael Sabella. Ruggiero soon became successful in bookmaking, extortion and loansharking rackets.

He lived in an apartment on Monroe Street in Manhattan in the same building as his friend and Bonanno soldier Anthony Mirra. Ruggiero reportedly owned a cigarette boat that he kept docked on the East River in New York. Ruggiero became good friends with future family boss Philip "Rusty" Rastelli and Mirra. Ruggiero became the part-owner of a fishery in the Fulton Fish Market in Manhattan. As a part-owner, Ruggiero put himself on the company payroll with a $5,000-a-month "no-show" job. During the 1970s, he purchased a social club in Little Italy.

=== Operation Donnie Brasco ===
Around the time Ruggiero became a made member in the Bonanno family, Anthony Mirra introduced him to Joseph Pistone. Pistone was an undercover FBI agent posing as an expert jewel thief named Donnie Brasco. Pistone's original mission had been to infiltrate truck hijacking and fencing rings. However, the friendships Pistone developed with Mirra and Ruggiero allowed the FBI to infiltrate the Mafia. Brasco started working for Ruggiero, placing bets and helping him make collections for the bookmaking operation in Ruggiero's social club.

Ruggiero mentored Brasco and eventually promised to sponsor him for membership in the family. Ruggiero developed a close friendship with Brasco, which caused friction with his old friend Mirra, who had initially introduced Brasco to Ruggiero. Brasco served as best man at Ruggiero's 1977 wedding and frequently advised Ruggiero on handling his son Tommy's heroin addiction.

Ruggiero once nearly discovered Brasco's true identity. Ruggiero and Brasco were in a Miami Beach, Florida restaurant as Ruggiero read a Time magazine containing an article about the infamous Abscam scandal and detailing how FBI agents posed as rich Arab businessmen to catch U.S. Congressmen taking bribes. What caught Ruggiero's eye was a picture of a white yacht that the FBI used to entertain the members of Congress. Ruggiero recognized the boat, the Left Hand, as the same boat Brasco provided several months before for a party. Brasco was able to convince Ruggiero that he did not know the boat's owner was related to the FBI.

During an earlier criminal enterprise, Ruggiero met Frank Balistrieri, the Mafia boss of Milwaukee, Wisconsin. Ruggiero admitted to Pistone that he felt threatened while in the presence of Balistrieri. In 1979, Ruggiero converted his social club into a candy store and gave it to one of his daughters to manage. At the same time, Ruggiero and Brasco started a bookmaking operation out of the store. However, Ruggiero was soon dropped from the partnership because he could not provide the initial investment of $25,000.

=== The three capos murder ===
In 1979, Bonanno boss Carmine Galante was murdered, creating a power vacuum in the family. After Galante's murder, Philip Rastelli took over, running the organization from prison. However, one faction, led by Alphonse "Sonny Red" Indelicato, rebelled at Rastelli's leadership. At this time, Ruggiero joined the crew of Dominick "Sonny Black" Napolitano, a strong Rastelli supporter. On May 5, 1981, Indelicato and two other rebel capos, Philip Giaccone and Dominick Trinchera, were lured to a meeting and murdered.

After the deaths of the three capos, the rebellion against Rastelli was quashed. According to Pistone, the murderers were Napolitano, John Cersani, Joe Massino, Sal Vitale, Joseph DeSimone, Gerlando Sciascia, Nicholas Santora, Vito Rizzuto, Louis Giongetti, and Santo Giordano. Ruggiero and Cersani were lookouts and were sent in after to clean up the massacre and dispose of the bodies, along with Napolitano, James Episcopia, and Robert Caposio.

=== Reputation ===
Ruggiero relished life as a mobster. In front of Pistone, he once explained: "As a wiseguy you can lie, you can cheat, you can steal, you can finagle, you can cause a ruckus ... you can do anything and nobody can say a word about it. Who wouldn't want to be a wiseguy?" Ruggiero was the epitome of a wiseguy and had the respect of other mobsters. He had a reputation as a killer, but, on a daily basis, was not prone to violence. Ruggiero had never served time in prison; he had been arrested many times but never jailed. Ruggiero earned his nickname "Lefty" from tossing dice left-handed while playing craps. He got the nickname "Two Guns" because when he went out on a hit, he liked to use two guns.

By the 1970s, Ruggiero had acquired a gambling dependency. He was betting and losing heavily on horse races. Soon, he was borrowing money from Nicholas Marangello to cover losing bets. By 1977, Ruggiero owed Marangello $160,000. The Bonanno family told Ruggiero that he would have to repay Marangello before he could become a made man. By 1977, Ruggiero had paid most of his debt to Marangello, and the family accepted his membership. However, by 1978, Ruggiero was back in debt again to Marangello. To settle the debt this time, the family arranged to transfer the revenues from part of Ruggiero's criminal operations directly to Marangello. Due to his gambling problem, Ruggiero was always trying to hide his few assets from his creditors, Marangello and Sabella.

=== Aftermath and death ===
On July 26, 1981, the Donnie Brasco operation ended. FBI agents visited Napolitano's apartment on top of The Motion Lounge and informed him of Brasco's true identity. After the Bonanno leadership learned the truth, they immediately followed the men who brought Brasco into their midst. Mirra and Napolitano were murdered shortly afterward. On August 29, 1981, the FBI intercepted and arrested Ruggiero.

In November 1982, Ruggiero, along with Santora, Antonio Tomasulo, and Anthony "Fat Tony" Rabito, was convicted in a six-week jury trial for racketeering conspiracy and received a 15-year prison sentence. Ruggiero refused to believe that Donnie Brasco was a special agent in the FBI and not his associate. Ruggiero told his lawyer, "He'll never go against us." However, after Pistone testified against Ruggiero, he later said, "I'll get that motherfucker Donnie if it's the last thing I do."

In April 1993, suffering from lung and testicular cancer, Ruggiero was released from prison after serving almost 11 years. He died on November 24, 1994.

In the 1997 film Donnie Brasco, Benjamin Ruggiero was portrayed by Al Pacino. Ruggiero's granddaughter Ramona Rizzo appeared on the TV show Mob Wives on VH-1.
