= Joseph D. Pistone =

American FBI agent (born 1939)

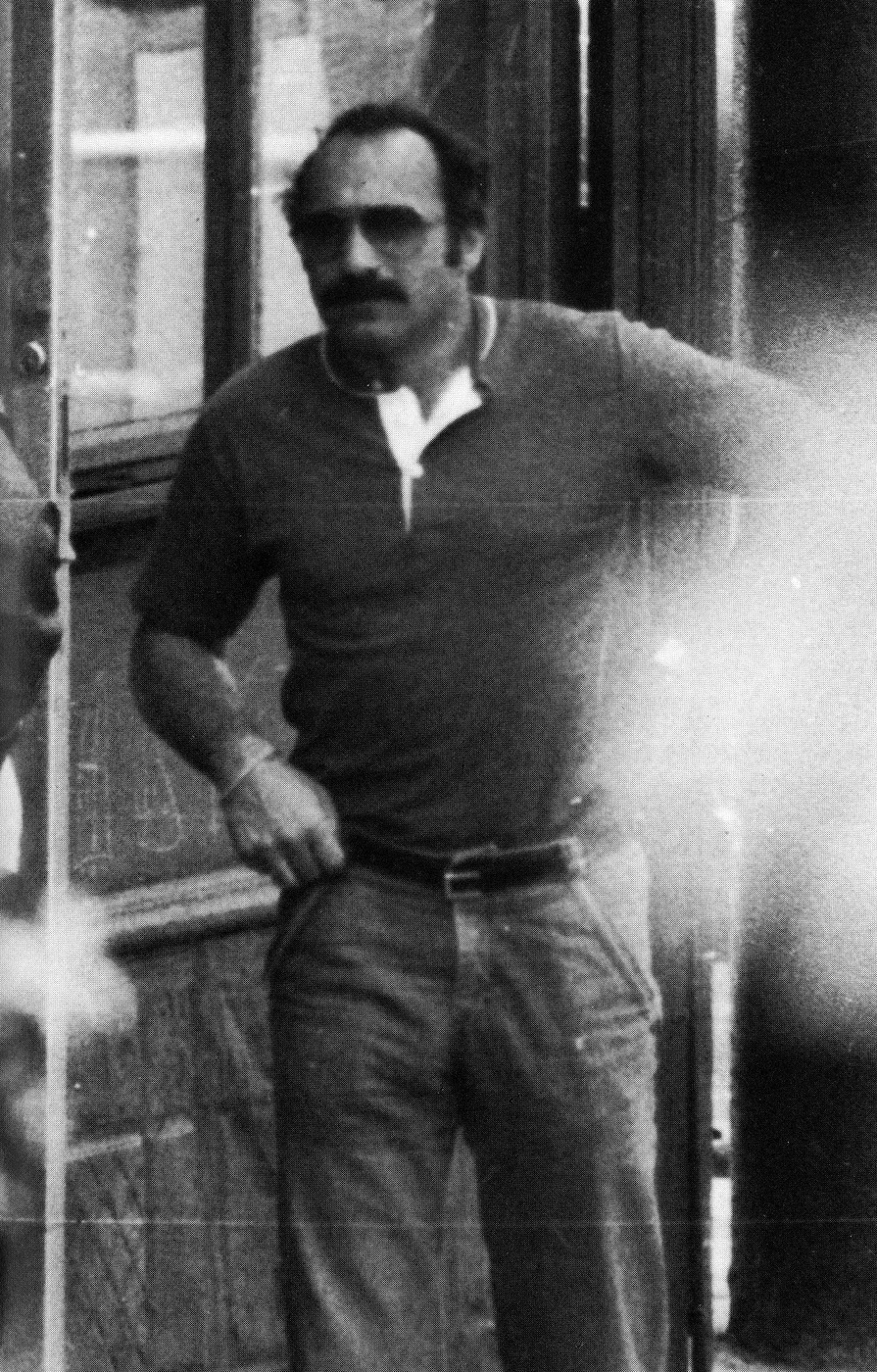
- FBI surveillance photo of Pistone as Donnie Brasco
- Born: Joseph Dominick Pistone; September 17, 1939 (age 87); Erie, Pennsylvania, U.S.
- Other name: "Donnie Brasco"
- Education: Paterson State College
- Occupation: FBI special agent
- Years active: 1969–1986
- Known for: Undercover work infiltrating the Bonanno crime family
- Notable work: Donnie Brasco: My Undercover Life in the Mafia
- Spouse: Maggie Pistone
- Children: 3

Joseph Dominick Pistone (born September 17, 1939) is an American former FBI special agent who worked undercover as Donnie Brasco between September 1976 and July 1981, (Note: In Pistone's first book Donnie Brasco: My Undercover Life in the Mafia, he stated his mob infiltration started in September 1976, making his infiltration period about five years. However, in his last book Donnie Brasco: Unfinished Business, he has stated that his mob infiltration started in 1975, making his infiltration period about six years.) as part of an infiltration primarily into the Bonanno crime family under the tutelage of Anthony Mirra and later Dominick Napolitano, and to a lesser extent the Colombo crime family, two of the Five Families of the Mafia in New York City. Pistone was an FBI agent for 17 years, from 1969 until he resigned in 1986. The evidence collected by Pistone led to over 200 indictments and over 100 convictions of Mafia members, and some responsible for his infiltration were also killed by other mobsters.

Pistone was a pioneer in long-term undercover work. The FBI's former director, J. Edgar Hoover, who died in 1972, did not want FBI agents to work undercover because of the danger of agents becoming corrupted. Pistone's work later helped convince the FBI that using undercover agents in lieu of relying exclusively on informants was a crucial tool in law enforcement. Pistone detailed his undercover experience in his 1988 book Donnie Brasco: My Undercover Life in the Mafia, the basis of the 1997 film about his life.

== Early life and career ==
Pistone was born in 1939 in Erie, Pennsylvania. He is of Italian heritage: his father was from Calabria while his mother was from Sicily, and grew up in Paterson, New Jersey, where he attended Eastside High School. He attended Paterson State College (now William Paterson University), obtaining a degree in anthropology in 1965.

He worked for a year as a teacher at Paterson School No. 10 and at the Office of Naval Intelligence for three years before being sworn into the FBI on July 7, 1969, and assigned to Jacksonville, Florida. In 1974, he was transferred to New York to work in the truck and hijack unit. Because of his ability to drive 18-wheeler trucks and bulldozers, he was eventually given undercover work infiltrating a vehicle theft ring, an assignment that resulted in over 30 arrests and a greater profile for Pistone within law enforcement.

== FBI career as Donnie Brasco ==
In the spring of 1976, Pistone volunteered to infiltrate the Bonanno crime family, a job for which his fluency in Italian, Sicilian heritage, and the knowledge of mafia idiosyncrasies gleaned from his Paterson background were well suited. For the undercover operation, the false identity of Donald "Donnie" Brasco was created, with a backstory that involved work as a low-level jewel thief. After extensive preparation including FBI gemology courses, he went undercover as a jewel thief.

The operation was given the code name "Sun-Apple" after the locations of its two simultaneous operations: Miami ("Sunny Miami") and New York City ("The Big Apple"). After months of planning, in September 1976, Pistone started his undercover operation—an operation that was initially intended to last for around six months, but which turned into several years. The FBI erased Pistone's name on office rolls and his personnel file; anyone who called asking for him would be told that no one by that name was employed there. His co-workers, friends, and informants had no idea what had happened to him. The original focus of the operation was to infiltrate big-time fences and truck hijackings that would in turn lead to the Mafia. While Pistone was undercover, he informed on the activities of the Mafia during some of the most volatile power struggles in organized crime.

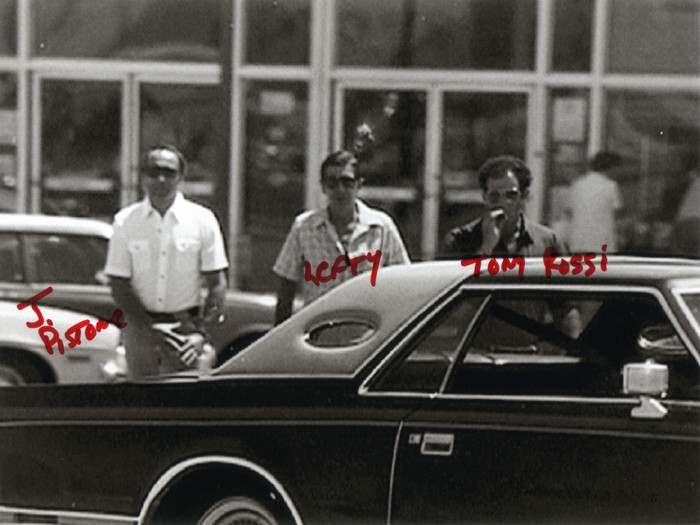
An FBI surveillance photograph of Joseph Pistone, Benjamin "Lefty" Ruggiero and Tony Rossi. Original notations by Joseph D. Pistone, made during the filming of Rossella Biscotti's 2008 film The Undercover Man.

Pistone worked his way into becoming an associate in Jilly Greca's crew from the Colombo family that was primarily involved in hijackings and robberies. After about six months, Pistone shifted to the Bonanno family by developing a relationship with Anthony Mirra. When Mirra was sent to prison, Pistone was tutored in the ways of the Mafia by Bonanno soldier Benjamin "Lefty" Ruggiero, whose captain was Mike "Mimi" Sabella. Pistone also had vending machine dealings with Frank Balistrieri of the Milwaukee crime family. After the 1979 murder of Carmine Galante, Pistone reported to captain Dominick "Sonny Black" Napolitano.

Pistone was responsible for a lucrative business venture in Holiday, Florida, when he opened and operated the King's Court Bottle Club. In Florida, Pistone worked with another FBI agent working undercover as Tony Rossi. Napolitano later contracted Pistone, whom he hoped to make a made man, to murder Alphonse "Sonny Red" Indelicato's son, Anthony "Bruno" Indelicato, who had previously evaded death after missing a May 1981 meeting which left Indelicato, Phillip Giaccone, and Dominick Trinchera dead.

The FBI then ordered the end of Pistone's operation. He wanted to continue until he was set to become a made man that December; Napolitano would lie about his "making his bones" (participating in a Mafia-ordered hit) to prove his loyalty. However, Pistone's superiors decided that the operation was becoming too dangerous and set an end date of July 26, 1981. Only after Pistone departed did FBI agents Doug Fencl, Jim Kinne, and Jerry Loar inform Napolitano that his longtime associate was an FBI agent. Pistone received a $500 bonus at the end of the operation.

=== Aftermath ===
Shortly thereafter, on August 17, 1981, Napolitano was murdered for having allowed an FBI agent to infiltrate the family; he was shot dead and his hands were cut off. Ruggiero was arrested by the FBI on August 29, 1981. Mirra was also later killed on February 18, 1982. About Napolitano's fate, Pistone had stated, "My intention in all of this was to put people in jail, not get them killed". In November 1982, Ruggiero, along with Nicholas Santora, Antonio Tomasulo, and Anthony "Fat Tony" Rabito, would be convicted in a six-week jury trial for racketeering conspiracy, receiving a 15-year prison sentence.

The Mafia put out a $500,000 contract on Pistone and kicked the Bonanno family off the Commission. FBI agents visited Mafia bosses in New York and advised them not to murder Pistone. The contract was dropped by Paul Castellano, who headed the Commission, because he thought killing a federal agent would "attract too much attention". Pistone publicly testified for the first time on August 2, 1982. The evidence collected by Pistone led to over 200 indictments and over 100 convictions of Mafia members. Although Pistone resigned from the FBI in 1986, he continued to testify when called upon, including at the Pizza Connection Trial.

Pistone's infiltration decimated the Bonanno family and also resulted in its expulsion from the Mafia Commission. Consequently, the Bonannos were not a target of the investigation leading to the Mafia Commission Trial that saw the top leadership of the "Five Families" sent to prison. By avoiding this, the family kept its leadership intact and was able to consolidate its power once again. The boss who led that resurgence, Joseph Massino, was convicted in 2004 of ordering Napolitano to be killed for allowing Pistone into the family.

Pistone lives in an undisclosed location, which he shared with his wife Maggie until her 2025 death; his three daughters may reside with him, all living under assumed names.

Pistone has been active as an author and consultant to worldwide law enforcement agencies, including Scotland Yard, and has been called to testify before the United States Senate as an expert on organized crime.

In September 2012, Pistone testified in Montreal, Quebec, at the Charbonneau Commission public inquiry into corruption, as an expert witness.

== Media ==
Pistone detailed his undercover experience in his 1988 book Donnie Brasco: My Undercover Life in the Mafia. The book was the basis for the Oscar-nominated 1997 film Donnie Brasco, for which Pistone worked as a technical adviser. The film starred Johnny Depp as Pistone and Al Pacino as "Lefty" Ruggiero. The book was also the basis for the short-lived 2000 television series Falcone, starring Jason Gedrick as Pistone – whose in-film alias was changed to "Joe Falcone" for legal reasons.

Pistone revisited his experiences as Donnie Brasco in his books The Way of the Wiseguy (2004) and Donnie Brasco: Unfinished Business (2007, co-authored with Charles Brandt). Pistone wrote a novel titled The Good Guys (2005) with Joseph Bonanno's son, Salvatore "Bill" Bonanno. He has also written several works of fiction such as Deep Cover, Mobbed Up and Snake Eyes. He has served as an executive producer on movies relating to the Mafia, including the 2006 film 10th & Wolf. In 2008, Italian artist Rossella Biscotti interviewed Pistone in her video The Undercover Man. A play based on Donnie Brasco opened at the Pennsylvania Playhouse.

His story was featured in a 1991 episode of FBI: The Untold Stories.

Pistone is featured in the eighth episode of UK history TV channel Yesterday's documentary series Mafia's Greatest Hits. A Secrets of the Dead episode, "Gangland Graveyard", features Pistone and his infiltration of the Mafia as part of the long-running investigation into the murder of three Mafia captains by Massino.

Pistone featured prominently in the 2013 miniseries Inside the American Mob. He features prominently in Episode 1 "Stayin' Alive in the '70s" and is the main focus of Episode 2, "Operation Donnie Brasco".

In 2018, Pistone featured in the Italian docu-fiction series Kings of Crime hosted by Italian journalist Roberto Saviano. A video of the interview is also available on Saviano's official YouTube channel.

In May 2020, Pistone started a podcast called Deep Cover: The Real Donnie Brasco.

In July 2025, he was a guest on The Joe Rogan Experience, episode #2343.

== Bibliography ==
- DeStefano, Anthony M. (2008). King of the Godfathers: Fall of the Bonanno Crime Family. New York: Kensington Publishing Corp. ISBN 9780806533094.
- Diehl, Christine S. (2006). "WP Has a "Sit-Down" with Joe Pistone/Donnie Brasco" (PDF). WP. Vol. 7, no. 1. William Paterson University. pp. 16–19.
- Jacobs, D. Lea (2002). Friend of the Family: An Undercover Agent in the Mafia. Washington DC: Compass Press. ISBN 9780929590196.
- Pistone, Joseph D. (1988). Donnie Brasco: My Undercover Life in the Mafia. New York: New American Library. ISBN 9780453005579.
- Pistone, Joseph D. (2005). The Way of The Wiseguy. Philadelphia: Running Press. ISBN 9780762423842.
- Pistone, Joseph D. (2008). Donnie Brasco: Unfinished Business. London: Hachette. ISBN 9780786741199.
- Raab, Selwyn (2016). Five Families: The Rise, Decline, and Resurgence. New York: St. Martin's Press. ISBN 9781250101709.
