= The French Connection (book) =

Book by Robin Moore

- First edition
- Author: Robin Moore
- Language: English
- Genre: True crime
- Publisher: Little, Brown, and Company (Boston)
- Publication date: 1969
- Publication place: United States
- Media type: Print (Hardback and paperback)
- Pages: 309 pp, illustrated, maps (on lining papers) 22 cm
- ISBN: 1-59228-044-7 978-1592280445

The French Connection, also known as The French Connection: The World's Most Crucial Narcotics Investigation and The French Connection: A True Account of Cops, Narcotics, and International Conspiracy, is a nonfiction book by Robin Moore first published in 1969 about the notorious "French Connection" drug-trafficking scheme. It is followed by the 1975 book The Set Up (also known as The Set Up: The Shocking Aftermath to the French Connection). The book was adapted to film in 1971 as The French Connection, written by Ernest Tidyman and directed by William Friedkin, which was followed by the film sequel French Connection II in 1975, and the television film sequel Popeye Doyle in 1986.

== Overview ==
The story follows the exhausting investigation of New York City detectives Eddie Egan and Sonny Grosso in 1961 as they attempt to uncover the participants of a major drug ring. Acting on a hunch, the detectives begin surveillance on Pasquale Fuca, who was observed in a nightclub consorting with known criminals. It soon becomes apparent that Fuca is involved in a large drug-trafficking operation, including two Frenchmen: Jean Jehan, the main person responsible for importing the heroin shipment to the United States, and Jacques Angelvin, a television personality.
