= French Connection =

Infamous 20th-century crime scheme

The French Connection was a scheme through which heroin was smuggled from Indochina through Turkey to France and then to the United States and Canada. The operation started in the 1930s, reached its peak in the 1960s, and was dismantled in the 1970s. It was responsible for providing the vast majority of the heroin used in the United States at the time. The operation was headed by Corsicans Antoine Guérini and Paul Carbone (with associate François Spirito). It also involved Auguste Ricord, Paul Mondoloni and Salvatore Greco.

== History ==
=== The 1930s, '40s, and '50s ===
Illegal heroin labs were first discovered near Marseille, France, in 1937. These labs were run by Corsican gang leader Paul Carbone. For years, the Corsican underworld had been involved in the manufacturing and trafficking of heroin, primarily to the United States. It was this heroin network that eventually became known as "the French Connection".

The Corsican Gang was protected by the Central Intelligence Agency (CIA) and the SDECE after World War II in exchange for working to prevent French Communists from bringing the Old Port of Marseille under their control.

Historically, the raw material for most of the heroin consumed in the United States came from Indochina, then Turkey. Turkish farmers were licensed to grow opium poppies for sale to legal drug companies, but many sold their excess to the underworld market, where it was manufactured into heroin and transported to the United States. The morphine paste was refined in Corsican laboratories in Marseille, one of the busiest ports in the western Mediterranean Sea, known for shipping all types of illegal goods. The Marseille heroin was considered high quality.

The convenience of the port at Marseille and the frequent arrival of ships from opium-producing countries made it easy to smuggle the morphine base to Marseille from the Far East or the Near East. The French underground would then ship large quantities of heroin from Marseille to New York City.

The first significant post-World War II seizure was made in New York on February 5, 1947, when seven pounds (3.2 kg) of heroin were seized from a Corsican sailor disembarking from a vessel that had just arrived from France.

It soon became clear that the French underground was increasing not only its participation in the illegal trade of opium, but also its expertise and efficiency in heroin trafficking. On March 17, 1947, 28 pounds (13 kg) of heroin were found on the French liner St. Tropez. On January 7, 1949, more than 50 pounds (23 kg) of opium and heroin were seized on the French ship Batista.

After Paul Carbone's death, the Guérini clan was the ruling dynasty of the Unione Corse and had systematically organized the smuggling of opium from Turkey and other Middle Eastern countries. The Guérini clan was led by Marseille mob boss Antoine Guérini and his brothers, Barthelemy, Francois and Pascal.

In October 1957, a meeting between Sicilian Mafia and American Mafia members was held at the Grand Hotel et des Palmes in Palermo to discuss the international illegal heroin trade in the French Connection.

=== The 1960s ===
The first major French Connection seizure in the 1960s began in June, when an informant told a drug agent in Lebanon that Mauricio Rosal, the Guatemalan Ambassador to Belgium, the Netherlands and Luxembourg, was smuggling morphine base from Beirut to Marseille. Narcotics agents had been seizing about 200 pounds (91 kg) of heroin in a typical year, but intelligence showed that the Corsican traffickers were smuggling in 200 pounds (91 kg) every other week. Rosal alone, in one year, had used his diplomatic status to bring in about 440 pounds (200 kg).

The Federal Bureau of Narcotics's 1960 annual report estimated that from 2,600 to 5,000 pounds (1,200 to 2,300 kilograms) of heroin were coming into the United States annually from France. The French traffickers continued to exploit the demand for their illegal product, and by 1969, they were supplying the United States with 80 percent of its heroin.

On April 26, 1968, a record setting seizure was made, 246 lb (111.6 kg) of heroin smuggled to New York concealed in a Citroën DS on the SS France (1960) ocean liner. The total amount smuggled during the many transatlantic voyages of just this one car was 1,606 lb (728.5 kg) according to arrested smuggler Jacques Bousquet.

In an effort to limit the most proximate source of supply to the Corsican cartel, US officials went to Turkey to negotiate the phasing out of opium production. Initially, the Turkish government agreed to limit their opium production starting with the 1968 crop.

At the end of the 1960s, after Robert Blemant's assassination by Antoine Guérini, a gang war started in Marseille, caused by competition over casino revenues. Blemant's associate Marcel Francisci continued the war over the next years.

==== Jean Jehan ====
Former New York City Police Department Narcotics Bureau detective Sonny Grosso has stated that the kingpin of the French Connection heroin ring during the 1950s into the 1960s was Corsican Jean Jehan. Although Jehan is reported to have arranged the famous 1962 deal gone wrong of 64 pounds of "pure" heroin, he was never arrested for his involvement in international heroin smuggling. According to Grosso, all warrants for the arrest of Jehan were left open. For years thereafter, Jehan was reported to be seen arranging and operating drug activities at will throughout Europe. According to William Friedkin, director of the 1971 film The French Connection, Jehan had been a member of the French Resistance to Nazi Occupation during World War II and, because of that, French law enforcement officials refused to arrest him. Friedkin was told that Jehan died peacefully of old age at his home in Corsica.

=== The 1970s: Dismantling ===
Following five subsequent years of concessions, combined with international cooperation, the Turkish government finally agreed in 1971 to a complete ban on the growing of Turkish poppies for the production of opium, effective June 29, 1971. During these protracted negotiations, law enforcement personnel went into action. One of the major roundups began on January 4, 1972, when agents from the U.S. Bureau of Narcotics and Dangerous Drugs (BNDD) and French authorities seized 110 pounds (50 kg) of heroin at the Paris airport. Subsequently, traffickers Jean-Baptiste Croce and Joseph Mari were arrested in Marseille. One such French seizure from the French Connection in 1973 netted 210 pounds (95 kg) of heroin worth $38 million.

In February 1972, French traffickers offered a United States Army sergeant $96,000 (equivalent to $738,902 in 2025) to smuggle 240 pounds (110 kg) of heroin into the United States. He informed his superior who in turn notified the BNDD. As a result of this investigation, five men in New York and two in Paris were arrested with 264 pounds (120 kg) of heroin, which had a street value of $50 million. In a 14-month period, starting in February 1972, six major illicit heroin laboratories were seized and dismantled in the suburbs of Marseille by French national narcotics police in collaboration with agents from the United States Drug Enforcement Administration. On February 29, 1972, French authorities seized the shrimp boat, Caprice des Temps, as it put to sea near Marseille heading towards Miami. It was carrying 915 pounds (415 kg) of heroin. Drug arrests in France skyrocketed from 57 in 1970 to 3,016 in 1972.

Also broken up as part of this investigation was the crew of American Mafia Lucchese family mobster Vincent Papa, whose members included Anthony Loria Sr. and Virgil Alessi. The well-organized gang was responsible for distributing close to a million dollars' worth of heroin up and down the East Coast of the United States during the early 1970s, which in turn led to a major New York Police Department (NYPD) corruption scheme. The scope and depth of this scheme are still not known, but officials suspect it involved corrupt NYPD officers who allowed Papa, Alessi, and Loria access to the NYPD property/evidence storage room, where hundreds of kilograms of heroin lay seized from the now-infamous French Connection bust, and from which the men would help themselves and replace missing heroin with flour and corn starch to avoid detection.

The substitution was discovered only when officers noticed insects eating all the bags of "heroin". By that point an estimated street value of approximately $70 million worth of heroin had already been taken. The racket was brought to light and arrests were made. Certain plotters received jail sentences, including Papa, who was later murdered in federal prison in Atlanta, Georgia.

Ultimately, the Guérini clan was exterminated during internecine wars within the French underworld. In 1971, Marcel Francisci was accused by the U.S. Bureau of Narcotics of being involved in the trafficking of heroin between Marseilles and New York City. On 16 January 1982, Marcel Francisci was shot to death as he was entering his car in the parking lot of the building where he lived in Paris, France.

== List of related gangsters ==
=== Unione Corse members ===
- Paul Carbone
- Marcel Francisci
- Antoine Guérini
- Barthélemy Guérini
- Paul Mondoloni
- Joseph Corsini
- Francois Spirito

=== Italian-Canadian mobsters ===
- Johnny Papalia, Hamilton, Ontario
- Vito Agueci, Hamilton
- Alberto Agueci, Hamilton
- Vic Cotroni, boss of the Cotroni crime family of Montreal and capo/boss of the Montreal faction of the Bonanno crime family

=== Italian-American mobsters ===
- Ignacio Antinori, Tampa, Florida gangster who founded the Trafficante crime family
- Frank Caruso
- Lucky Luciano, Five Families gangster who founded the Genovese crime family
- Vinnie Mauro
- Frank Ragano, Tampa, Florida attorney supporting the Trafficante crime family
- Joseph "Hoboken Joe" Stassi (AKA "Joe Rogers"), independent but well-placed in organized crime

==== Bonanno crime family members ====
- Joseph Bonanno, Bonanno crime family boss
- Carmine Galante

==== Gambino crime family members ====
- Joseph Armone

==== Lucchese crime family members ====
- Giovanni "Big John" Ormento, a capo involved in large scale narcotic trafficking
- Salvatore Lo Proto, an important member of Big John's narcotic trafficking ring
- Angelo M. Loiacano, wholesaler of Big John Ormento's narcotic trafficking ring
- Angelo "Little Angie" Tuminaro, an associate, involved in narcotic trafficking
- Pasquale "Patsy" Fuca, nephew to Tuminaro, involved in the narcotic trade
- Anthony DiPasqua, was a narcotic trafficker
- Vincent Papa, was the mastermind behind the "Stealing of the French Connection"
- Anthony Loria, partner with Vincent Papa in the "Stealing of the French Connection"

=== Black members ===
- Frank Matthews

== Related films ==
- William Friedkin, The French Connection (1971)
- Francis Ford Coppola, The Godfather (1972)
- Sidney J. Furie, Hit! (1973)
- Howard W. Koch, Badge 373 (1973)
- Robert Parrish, The Marseille Contract (1974)
- John Frankenheimer, French Connection II (1975)
- Andrew V. McLaglen, Mitchell (1975)
- Blake Edwards, Revenge of the Pink Panther (1978)
- Sidney Lumet, Prince of the City (1981)
- Peter Levin, Popeye Doyle (1986)
- Ridley Scott, American Gangster (2007)
- Cédric Jimenez, The Connection (La French) (2014)

== See also ==
- Lucien Conein
- Allegations of CIA drug trafficking
- Federal Bureau of Narcotics
- Bureau of Narcotics and Dangerous Drugs
