= French underground =

French Underground may refer to the

- French Resistance during World War II
- French crime (see French Connection, Unione Corse, etc.)
