= Out of the Darkness (1985 film) =

- Genre: Crime; Drama; Thriller
- Written by: T. S. Cook
- Directed by: Jud Taylor
- Starring: Martin Sheen
- Theme music composer: Billy Goldenberg
- Country of origin: United States
- Original language: English

Production
- Producers: Sonny Grosso; Larry Jacobson
- Production locations: Coney Island; Brooklyn; New York City; Yonkers, New York; Union City, New Jersey
- Cinematography: Brian West
- Editor: Norman Gay
- Running time: 120 minutes
- Production company: Centerpoint Productions

Original release
- Network: CBS
- Release: October 12, 1985

Out of the Darkness is a 1985 American made-for-television crime thriller film about the pursuit of the serial killer David Berkowitz by New York City detective Ed Zigo, played by Martin Sheen.

== Cast ==
- Martin Sheen as Eddie Zigo
- Héctor Elizondo as Father George
- Matt Clark as John Hubbard
- Jennifer Salt as Ann Zigo
- Eddie Egan as Tom Duncan
- Robert Trebor as David Berkowitz
- Val Avery as Guido Pressano
- Joe Spinell as Jim Halsey
- Victor Arnold as Nick Zigo
- Charlie Sheen as Man Shaving
