= Eddie Egan =

American police detective and actor (1930–1995)

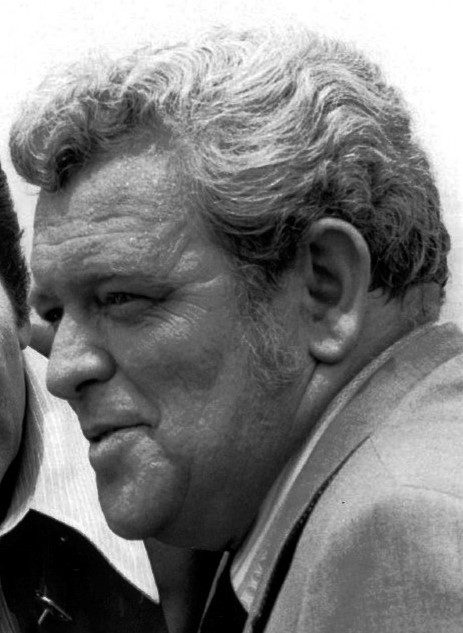
- Egan in the Mannix episode "The Open Web", 1972
- Born: Edward Walter Egan; January 3, 1930; New York City, U.S.
- Died: November 4, 1995 (aged 65); Miami, Florida, U.S.
- Occupations: Police detective, actor
- Spouse: Dolores Popkivich
- Children: 2

Edward W. Egan (January 3, 1930 – November 4, 1995) was an American actor and former police detective. He was the subject of the nonfiction book The French Connection and its 1971 film adaptation.

== Life ==
Edward W. Egan was born in Queens, New York City on January 3, 1930, to Irish-American parents. Raised by his grandmother after being orphaned at age 12, he joined the U.S. Marine Corps in 1947. After his discharge, he played baseball for the New York Yankees' Triple-A club in 1950, but he was recalled to active duty for the Korean War. However, Edward Egan does not appear on the roster of the Yankees' triple A team. After his second discharge, he joined the New York City Police Department (NYPD) in 1955.

His career with the NYPD spanned 15 years, and he was reported to have been responsible for more than 8,000 arrests. Among his exploits, Egan (along with his partner Sonny Grosso and other NYPD detectives) broke up an organized-crime ring in 1961, seizing 112 pounds of heroin, a record amount at the time. The investigation was chronicled in a 1969 book, The French Connection, by Robin Moore.

The book was adapted into a motion picture of the same name, released in 1971. The movie was highly fictionalized and very successful. The character based on Egan, Jimmy "Popeye" Doyle, was played by Gene Hackman, who won an Academy Award for his performance (the film also won Oscars for Best Picture, Director, Screenplay, and Editing). The character was called "Popeye" because that was Egan's nickname in real life. Egan played a role in the movie as Hackman's supervisor, Simonson. Egan and Grosso were also technical advisors. Hackman reprised this role in the sequel film French Connection II in 1975, which depicts a wholly fictional story.

Soon after the film was released, Egan asked to retire from the NYPD. On his retirement day in November 1971, he was fired for failing to make court appearances in conjunction with his cases and for failing to turn in contraband weapons and narcotics, losing him his pension benefits. He won an appeal, and his pension was reinstated.

In 1973, another film, called Badge 373, with Robert Duvall playing the role of Egan, was released detailing Egan's career. Egan played Lt. Scanlon in the movie, once again (like in The French Connection) as an authority figure more or less sympathetic to the protagonist whose personality is based on himself. Also in 1973, ABC ordered and aired a television pilot entitled Egan, this time with Eugene Roche playing Egan, a tough NYPD cop transferred to Los Angeles, but it failed to go to series. In 1986, Fox developed Popeye Doyle, a proposed series based on the fictionalized character from the two films rather than Egan himself, with Ed O'Neill playing the title character. Although the series was never produced, the pilot was broadcast as an NBC-TV Movie and has been shown in syndication.

After retiring from the NYPD, Egan became a full-time actor, usually playing law-enforcement figures. He portrayed the head of the NYPD's Son of Sam task force in the 1985 movie Out of the Darkness, and throughout his career, he played roles in more than 20 movies and television series. He moved to Fort Lauderdale, Florida, in 1984.

== Death ==
Egan died of colon cancer at the University of Miami Cancer Center on November 4, 1995, at the age of 65. He was engaged to Cheryl Kyle-Little at the time. He was interred at Calverton National Cemetery on November 8.

== Filmography ==
=== Film ===
Year	Title	Role	Notes
1971	The French Connection	Captain Walt Simonson	
1972	Prime Cut	Jake	
1973	Badge 373	Lieutenant Scanlon	
1974	Let's Go for Broke	Himself	
1987	Cold Steel	Lieutenant Hill	

=== Television ===
Year	Title	Role	Notes
1972	Mannix	Lieutenant Paul Haber	Episode: "The Open Web"
1972	Night of Terror	Lieutenant Costin	Television film
1973	McCloud	Al Barber	Episode: "Showdown at the End of the World"
1975	Cop on the Beat	Sergeant Malone	Television film
1975–1976	Joe Forrester	Sergeant Bernie Vincent	22 episodes
1975–1977	Police Woman	Captain / Jack Ballard / Brock	3 episodes
1975–1977	Police Story	Ron Butler / Lieutenant Holtzman / Captain R.E. Mead / Sean McLiam / Sergeant Harry Volmer / Malone	6 episodes
1977	Baretta	Thompson	Episode: "Don't Kill the Sparrows"
1978	To Kill a Cop	Chief Ed Palmer	Television film
1979	David Cassidy: Man Undercover	Detective Riggs	Episode: "Nightwork"
1979–1980	Eischied	Chief Inspector Ed Parks	12 episodes
1980	Police Story: Confessions of a Lady Cop	Captain Harrison	Television film
1981	Crazy Times	The Bartender	Television film
1983	T. J. Hooker	Max Silver	Episode: "Requiem for a Cop"
1983	Murder Me, Murder You	Hennessey	Television film
1984	Mickey Spillane's Mike Hammer	Hennessey	7 episodes
1985	Out of the Darkness	Tom Duncan	Television film
1987	Houston Knights		Episode: "Mirrors"
1989	True Blue	Detective	Episode: "Pilot: Part 1"
