= Joseph Raymond Merola =

NASCAR driver and smuggler (1925–1994)

Joseph Raymond Merola (1925 – 1994) was an Italian-American NASCAR driver and businessman from Pennsylvania who was involved in international intelligence and organized crime.

Merola is known for being the only driver to ever enter a Tucker 48 in a NASCAR race and for his involvement in arms smuggling to the 26th of July Movement during the Cuban Revolution. He was later a person of interest for the House Select Committee on Assassinations.

== NASCAR ==
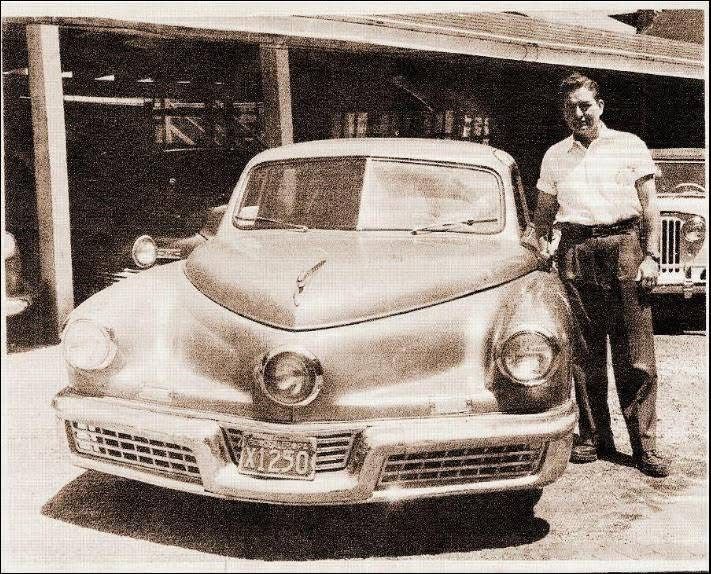
Joe Merola poses with the Tucker he would drive in the NASCAR Grand National event at Canfield, Ohio.

Between 1949 and 1951, Merola competed in the NASCAR Grand National Series. On May 30, 1950, at the "Poor Man's 500" at Canfield Speedway, Merola entered a 1948 Tucker 48 (Chassis #1004). While the car failed to finish due to a broken axle, this remains the only recorded instance of a Tucker 48 entering a NASCAR-sanctioned race. His career-best finish was 9th place at the 1951 Charlotte Speedway 100.

== Cuban Revolution and Intelligence ==
In the late 1950s, Merola was a close associate of former Cuban President Carlos Prío Socarrás, Norman Rothman and Pittsburgh Crime Family Capo Gabriel "Kelly" Mannarino. Mannarino sold his interests in the Sans Souci Cabaret in Havana to Santo Trafficante Jr.. According to historical accounts. Merola facilitated the smuggling of arms to Fidel Castro's forces with Rothman and Mannarino.

Following the revolution, Merola was detained at the Triscornia detention center in Havana alongside Santo Trafficante Jr., as noted in Trafficante's 1977 HSCA testimony. CIA records from the 1960s further identify Merola as a contact for the Miami Field Office, known by the cryptonym JMWAVE.
