= The American Trap =

- French: Le Piège américain
- Directed by: Charles Binamé
- Written by: Fabienne Larouche; Michel Trudeau
- Produced by: Fabienne Larouche; Michel Trudeau
- Starring: Rémy Girard; Gérard Darmon; Colm Feore
- Cinematography: Pierre Gill
- Edited by: Dominique Fortin
- Music by: Sari Dijani; Iohann Martin; Rudy Toussaint
- Production company: Aetios
- Distributed by: Alliance Atlantis
- Release date: August 26, 2008
- Running time: 95 minutes
- Country: Canada
- Language: French

The American Trap (French: Le Piège américain) is a 2008 Canadian drama film from Quebec, directed by Charles Binamé. The film stars Rémy Girard as Lucien Rivard, a Canadian working in the criminal underworld of Havana, Cuba who becomes enmeshed in international intrigue around the assassination of John F. Kennedy.

== Cast ==
- Rémy Girard , Lucien Rivard
- Gérard Darmon - Paul Mondolini
- Colm Feore - Maurice Bishop
- Serge Houde - DEA Agent Thompson
- Bill Lake - Herbert Hoover
- Manuel Tadros - Joseph Valachi
- Dino Tavarone - Carlos Marcello
- Larry Day - Santo Trafficante Jr.
- Tony Calabretta - Jack Ruby

== Award nominations ==
The film garnered five Genie Award nominations at the 29th Genie Awards in 2009:

- Best Cinematography: Pierre Gill
- Best Art Direction/Production Design: Danielle Labrie
- Best Costume Design: Michèle Hamel
- Best Overall Sound: Claude La Haye, Daniel Bisson, Luc Boudrias and Patrick Lalonde
- Best Sound Editing: Jean-François Sauvé, Natalie Fleurant, Jérôme Décarie and Claude Beaugrand
