= Unione Corse =

Corsican criminal organization

- Founding location: Marseille, France
- Years active: 1930s–1970s
- Territory: France (mainly Corsica and Provence-Alpes-Côte d'Azur)
- Ethnicity: Corsican and Italian French
- Criminal activities: Racketeering, drug trafficking, gambling, extortion, robbery, loan sharking, weapons trafficking, pimping, fraud, murder, bribery and fencing
- Allies: American Mafia; Sicilian Mafia; Camorra

The Unione Corse (Corsican: Unione Corsa; Occitan: Union Corsa) is a term designating the Corsican organized crime as a whole during the period 1930s–1970s, in the context of the French Connection, an international heroin trade network operated at that time between Turkey, Southern France, and the United States. A 1972 Time article described the "Unione Corse" as a Corsican-based unified and secretive crime syndicate akin to the American Five Families. The local situation in Southern France during this period was in reality more complex, with a nebula of mainly Corsican and Italian-French clans cooperating or fighting each other according to the circumstances and opportunities. If they constituted a key element of the wider French Connection, flooding the American market with Marseille-produced heroin from the 1950s to early 1970s, those clans remained overshadowed by the much more powerful Italian-American Mafia.

== History ==
=== French Connection ===
The geographic location of Marseille and Corsica in the Mediterranean led them to become strategic points of the French Connection from the early 1950s up until the early 1970s. Corsican and Italian mobsters Paul Carbone and François Spirito, who dominated organised crime in Marseille in the 1930s, had laid the foundations of the French segment by setting up the first opium processing chain intended for the United States. The international drug route Turkey–Marseille–New York flourished after the early 1950s, when it was structured by mobster Lucky Luciano and the Italian-American mafia after their previous source, legal Italian pharmaceutical production hijacked by the Camorra, was shut down in 1951.

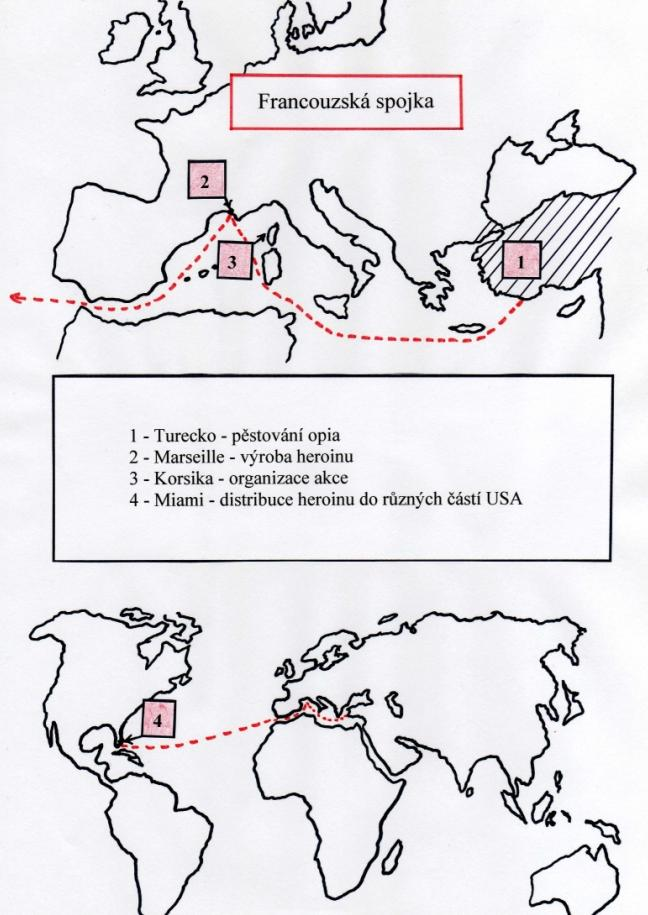
The French Connection in the 1960s.

Morphine base, derived from the cultivation of poppies, was smuggled in from Turkey by boat, before being transformed into heroin by local chemists in the Marseille area, and from there was shipped to its final destination, the large and growing American market. Heroin produced at that time in Marseille was reputed to be 98% pure. It is estimated that around 80% of the heroin consumed in the United States by the early 1970s had been smuggled in from France. By the early 1960s, this figure was 90%.

The French Connection was eventually broken up by French and American authorities in the early 1970s, in the context of the "war on drugs" campaign launched by Richard Nixon in 1971. French judge Pierre Michel, whose investigations were decisive in breaking up the traffic in Southern France, was assassinated in 1981 in Marseille.

The French Connection was mainly managed on its French section by Italo-Corsican clans. The latter did not control the whole traffic and participated in it in response to a call for tender from the Sicilians in New York. According to scholar Laurent Mucchielli, they rather constituted the local segment of a vast international network and were commercial partners, or even subcontractors, of the much more powerful Italian-American Cosa Nostra.

=== Influence and structure ===
In 1972, a year after the release of the film The French Connection, a Time magazine article mentioned the existence of a unified crime syndicate composed of about fifteen Corsican families, including the Francisci, Orsini, Venturi and Guerini clans, operating in the manner of the American mafia families. The article claims that "the Union Corse is more tightly knit and more secretive than its Sicilian counterpart", family ties creating bonds between the members, which are not only stronger but allow protection against outsiders trying to either infiltrate or gather information about any of the members. According to the article, the symbol of the Unione Corse was the same as the symbol for Corsica, the Moor's head, a depiction of a black human head with a rag tied around the forehead, on a white field. A member of this society may wear it as a pendant or a watch fob.

Although they concede that Corsican clans participating in the French Connection enjoyed relative impunity until the early 1970s, most French and American observers believe that the existence of a Corsican crime syndicate as described by Time magazine is an exaggerated account of the reality of that time, as there was no such thing as a pyramidal Corsican mafia run by a single board of directors and deeply infiltrated into the state. Investigative journalist Jacques Follorou writes the local situation was characterized by a "galaxy of separate clans, sometimes allies, sometimes enemies, which have taken advantage of particular historical circumstances to flourish, and who know how to make some relations with the political and administrative apparatus in order to protect themselves." According to writer Laurent Mucchielli, the hierarchy of this multitude of networks was based "on authority and prestige [and] the principle of vendettas (...) [They were organised] as competing families which have in common only their origin and the fact that they occasionally join to make a good deal.

If the initial French official response to the French Connection was seen or exploited by the American authorities as evidence of relations between local political elites and the organised crime, scholars highlight other probable explanations: the low level of drug use in France until the end of the 1960s, the major efforts required by the Algerian War until 1962, and the opposition to American interference by the ruling Gaullist party. Furthermore, French-American collaboration against the French Connection precedes the eventual shutdown of the network in the early 1970s, as evidenced by the arrest of prominent Corsican chemist Jo Cesari near Marseille in 1964. At any rate, both the American and French authorities, who feared a Communist contagion in Western Europe, did work with Italo-Corsican clans in the late 1940s–early 1950s to break dockworkers strikes in Marseille in the context of the containment doctrine. Scholars also contend that the influence of the Italo-Corsican organized crime on local authorities in the Marseille area rather flourished in the 1930s and declined after World War II, when the French Connection thrived. Researcher Paola Monzini has argued that the relevance of a rapprochement with local politicians becomes less obvious as trafficking takes on an international dimension.

== In popular culture ==
In Ian Fleming's James Bond novel On Her Majesty's Secret Service (1963), the Unione Corse is depicted as a Corsican-based mafia led by Marc-Ange Draco. The Union Corse also appears in Frederick Forsyth's novel The Day of the Jackal (1971).

In the manga Banana Fish, the head of the Union Corse, Dino Golzine, is the main antagonist of the story.
