= List of Banana Fish characters =

The following is a list of characters in the manga series Banana Fish by Akimi Yoshida. Voice actors in the 2018 anime adaptation of Banana Fish are noted where applicable.

== Primary characters ==
Ash Lynx (アッシュ・リンクス, Asshu Rinksu)
Voiced by: Yuma Uchida (Japanese); Brandon McInnis (English)
The alias of Aslan Jade Callenreese (アスラン・ジェイド・カーレンリース, Asuran Jeido Kārenrīsu), a seventeen-year-old leader of a gang of teenagers in New York City. Formerly a sex slave, enforcer, and heir to the criminal empire of Dino Golzine, Ash joined the mob as a young child after running away from his home in Cape Cod. Ash breaks from Golzine to solve the mystery of "banana fish", which drove his brother to insanity in Vietnam. Ash commands extraordinary intellect, charisma, and tactical foresight, in addition to being an expert marksman and knife fighter. His physical appearance is based on Stefan Edberg and, as the series progresses, River Phoenix.
Eiji Okumura (奥村 英二, Okumura Eiji)
Voiced by: Kenji Nojima (Japanese); Jonathan Tanigaki (English)
A nineteen-year-old Japanese college student and former competitive pole vaulter, Eiji was forced into early retirement due to injury and now works as an assistant to photographer Shunichi Ibe. He travels to New York with Ibe to complete a report on street gangs, where he becomes a close confidant to Ash. Eiji is kind and gentle, though frequently stubborn and naïve. Ash's deep affection for Eiji is frequently exploited by his enemies, who correctly intuit that Ash's willingness to sacrifice himself to protect Eiji is his sole weakness. Eiji's appearance is based on the actor Hironobu Nomura.

== Ash's and Eiji's affiliates ==
Max Lobo (マックス・ロボ, Makkusu Robo)
Voiced by: Hiroaki Hirata (Japanese); Keith Silverstein (English)
The alias of Max Glenreed (マックス・グレンリード, Makkusu Gurenrīdo), a Vietnam War veteran, freelance journalist, and former New York City Police Department officer. Deployed in the same platoon as Ash's older brother Griffin, Ash initially blames Max for his brother's mental illness, though he later becomes one of Ash's closest confidants in his investigation of banana fish. His physical appearance is based on Harrison Ford.
Shunichi Ibe (伊部 俊一, Ibe Shun'ichi)
Voiced by: Shinji Kawada (Japanese); Greg Chun (English)
A Japanese photojournalist who comes to New York City to do a report on street gangs.
Griffin Callenreese (グリフィン・カーレンリース, Gurifin Kārenrīsu)
Voiced by: Kazuhiro Fusegawa (Japanese); Jonah Scott (English)
Ash's older brother. A veteran of the Vietnam War, Griffin became severely mentally handicapped after being used as a test subject for banana fish. Later killed in the crossfire of a confrontation with Golzine's men.
Alexis Dawson (アレクシス・ドースン, Arekushisu Dōsun)
Voiced by: Hidenari Ugaki (Japanese); Rob Nagle (English)
A pathologist at the University of California. As a student, he and his brother Abraham accidentally created Banana Fish while attempting to synthesize LSD.
Jessica Randy (ジェシカ・ランディ, Jeshika Randi)
Voiced by: Rika Fukami (Japanese); Erin Yvette (English)
A journalist and Max's ex-wife. Jessica takes Ash's group in during their investigation of banana fish, and later joins the group for their final battle against Golzine. She and Max reconcile their relationship towards the end of the series.

== Corsican mafia ==
Dino Golzine (ディノ・ゴルツィネ, Dino Gorutsine)
Voiced by: Unshō Ishizuka (Japanese); Christopher Swindle (English)
A kingpin in the Unione Corse who aims to expand his power by selling banana fish to the United States government. Ash's former patron and later adopted father, he has groomed Ash since he was a child to be his sex slave and heir to his criminal empire.
Frederick Arthur (フレデリック・オーサー, Furederikku Ōsā)
Voiced by: Yoshimasa Hosoya (Japanese); Pierson Fode (English)
A vindictive and cruel ex-member of Ash's street gang, who allies himself with Golzine in order to usurp Ash.
Abraham Dawson (エイブラハム・ドースン, Eiburahamu Dōsun)
Voiced by: Yū Hayashi (Japanese); Austen Moret (English)
The younger brother of Alexis. He defied his brother's wishes to destroy banana fish and continues to develop and weaponize the drug for the Corsican mob into his adulthood. As a doctor during the Vietnam War, he tested banana fish on unknowing soldiers, including Griffin.
Mannerheim (マナーハイム, Manāhaimu)
Voiced by: Yōji Ueda (Japanese); David Hayter (English)
The director of a federal mental health facility secretly funded by the Union Corse. He experiments on violent criminals to observe the effects of banana fish.
Blanca (ブランカ, Buranka)
Voiced by: Toshiyuki Morikawa (Japanese); J. Michael Tatum (English)
The alias of Sergei Varishkov (セルゲイ・ヴァリシコフ, Serugei Varishikofu), a Kazakh assassin and former KGB lieutenant who defected from the Soviet Union after his wife, a political dissenter, was murdered. Prior to the events of the series, he is employed by Golzine to train Ash to become Golzine's heir. He subsequently retires to the Caribbean but is called out of retirement by Golzine to capture Ash. A highly effective killer who dutifully carries out any contract for which he is hired, he ultimately refuses to kill Eiji on Yut-Lung's orders and defects to Ash's gang.
Eduardo L. Fox (エドアルド・L・フォックス, Edoarudo Eru Fokkusu)
Voiced by: Kenyu Horiuchi (Japanese); Mick Lauer (English)
A sadistic mercenary and former member of the French Foreign Legion, hired by Golzine to capture Ash.

== Chinese mafia ==
Shorter Wong (ショーター・ウォン, Shōtā Won)
Voiced by: Makoto Furukawa (Japanese); Daniel J. Kim (English)
A Chinese American gang leader who controls Chinatown. Was a close friend and ally to Ash, the two met while in juvenile prison together. Shorter is sociable and gregarious, in contrast to Ash's stoicism. He is injected with banana fish by Golzine's men and ordered to kill Eiji, though he is able to ask Ash to kill him before he is able to do so.
Lee Yut-Lung (李月龍(リー・ユエルン), Rī Yuerun)
Voiced by: Jun Fukuyama (Japanese); Khoi Dao (English)
The youngest son of the Lee family, the largest crime family in China. He is first introduced under the alias Yau-Si (ユーシス, Yūshisu). Possessing an encyclopedic knowledge of herbs and poisons, he allies with Golzine to determine the chemical composition of banana fish. Yut-Lung possesses a deep grudge towards his brothers, who raped and murdered his concubine mother, and eventually violently deposes them. He is hostile towards Ash and Eiji and frequently attempts to capture and murder the latter.
Sing Soo-Ling (シン・スウ・リン, Shin Sū Rin)
Voiced by: Shōya Chiba (Japanese); Caleb Yen (English)
A fourteen-year-old Chinese American boy who assumes control of the Chinatown gang upon Shorter's death. He becomes a reluctant ally to Ash after initially blaming him for Shorter's death. Though outwardly child-like and carefree, he is a skilled tactician and leader.
Lao Yen-Thai (ラオ・イェン・タイ, Rao Yen Tai)
Voiced by: Soma Saito (Japanese); Cory Yee (English)
Sing's half-brother. Though Sing forgives Ash for killing Shorter, Lao continues to distrust him and resents Sing's deference to Ash in the ongoing gang war. In the final scene of the story, Lao stabs and kills Ash.

== Street gangs ==
Alex (アレックス, Arekkusu)
Voiced by: Haruki Ishiya (Japanese); Elliot Fletcher (English)
The second-in-command in Ash's gang.
Skip (スキップ, Sukippu)
Voiced by: Ayumu Murase (Japanese); Levi Mynatt (English)
An African-American boy and a member of Ash's gang. Killed in a confrontation with Golzine's men.
Bones (ボーンズ, Bōnzu)
Voiced by: Masato Niwa (Japanese); John Omohundro (English)
A lieutenant in Ash's gang assigned to protect Eiji.
Kong (コング, Kongu)
Voiced by: Takahiro Sumi (Japanese); Bill Butts (English)
A lieutenant in Ash's gang assigned to protect Eiji.
Cain Blood (ケイン・ブラッド, Kain Buraddo)
Voiced by: Kenta Miyake (Japanese); Michael Woodley (English)
The leader of Black Sabbath, an African American gang that controls Harlem. Though initially neutral, he later allies with Ash in his battles against Arthur and Golzine.

== New York City Police Department ==
Antonio Jenkins (アントニオ・ジェンキンズ, Antonio Jenkinzu)
Voiced by: Mitsuru Ogata (Japanese); Michael Benyaer (English)
A diabetic homicide detective assigned to investigate deaths caused by banana fish.
Charlie Dickenson (チャーリー・ディキンソン, Chārī Dikenson)
Voiced by: Yōji Ueda (Japanese); Jonah Scott (English)
A homicide detective. A friend of Max, the two met while in a police academy. In a romantic relationship with Nadia, Shorter Wong's older sister.
