= Lucien Rivard =

Canadian criminal (1914–2002)

- Born: June 16, 1915; Canada
- Died: February 3, 2002 (aged 87)
- Occupation: Casino operator
- Time at large: Four months
- Escaped: 1965

Lucien Rivard (June 16, 1915 – February 3, 2002) was a Quebec criminal known for a sensational prison escape in 1965.

== Background ==
Rivard had been engaged in robbery and smuggling drugs since the 1940s. He has been described as a "petty crook" in his early years, but in the 1956 he moved to Cuba and operated a casino, and became involved in the heroin business. In 1958 he moved back to Laval, Quebec, and operated the business "Domaine Idéal" to continue dealing drugs and weapons.

In Cuba, Rivard co-owned with Norman Rothman and Paul Mondoloni the El Morocco, a nightclub in Camagüey. He also had interests in the casino at the Plaza Hotel. With Mondoloni and Jean Croce he was involved in narcotics trafficking. Cuban dictator Fulgencio Batista was paid $20,000 per week to allow the narcotics to be moved. He smuggled guns for Fidel Castro and his rebels. However after the Cuban Revolution Rivard was arrested by the Castro government and later released. In June 1959 he received a deportation notice, returning to Toronto via Jamaica. He later met up again with Mondoloni at Acapulco in Mexico, a country they would return to on many occasions.

In October 1963 drug runner Michel Caron was arrested in Texas as he attempted to cross the border from Mexico with 35 kg of heroin, while in custody he implicated Rivard. Attorney General Bobby Kennedy got personally involved and sought to prosecute Rivard. In 1965, Rivard was held in Bordeaux Prison, Quebec while awaiting extradition to the United States. He used a water hose to climb a wall and escape. He was missing for four months before being caught and extradited to the United States. During his absence, he wrote letters to various people, telling the Prime Minister of Canada Lester B. Pearson "Life is short, you know. I don't intend to be in jail for the rest of my life." He was finally captured on 16 July 1965 near Châteauguay, Quebec. He was extradited to Texas where he served nine years in prison.

== Aftermath ==
Allegations of bribery regarding the government of Canada during Rivard's escape provoked an investigation, and Attorney General Guy Favreau left office as a consequence. Favreau had been gaining prestige at the time, and when he left, Prime Minister Pearson sought out new Quebec MPs to replace him, namely Jean Marchand, Pierre Trudeau and Gérard Pelletier. Trudeau became Prime Minister in 1968.

The escape inspired the song "The Gallic Pimpernel." In addition, the Canadian Press voted Rivard the Canadian Newsmaker of the Year for 1965 - the first time a convicted criminal had been given that title. In 2006, it was announced that the Quebec government would help sponsor the film The American Trap (Le piège américain), to be directed by Charles Binamé with Rémy Girard to play Lucien Rivard.

The escape also inspired the song "A Government Inquiry" by The Brothers-in-Law in their album Oh, Oh Canada (Arc A636), and comedian Rich Little to parody Prime Minister Lester Pearson singing "Old Man Rivard".
