= Norman Rothman =

American gangster (1914–1985)

- Born: 26 December 1914; New York City
- Died: October 1985 (aged 70)

Norman Rothman (aka "Roughhouse", December 26, 1914 in New York City – October 1985) was an American gangster.

== Life ==
Rothman was an infamous member of the La Cosa Nostra operating in South Florida. In 1945 he joined the U.S. Army.

He was a close associate of Santo Trafficante, Jr., boss of the Trafficante crime family in Florida, with whom he would operate casinos in Havana, Cuba, most notably, the Sans Souci. He was manager of the club under its previous owners the brothers Gabriel "Kelly" and Sammy Mannarino, both of the Pittsburgh Mafia. When Trafficante bought the club in 1955 he kept Rothman on as manager. Rothman lived in the FOCSA Building in Central Vedado, Havana. He was a frequent attendee at Trafficante's Tropicana Club, where his showgirl girlfriend Olga Chaviano worked. On one occasion he tried to collect a $4,200 gambling debt racked up at the Sans Souci by Dana C. Smith, a friend of Richard Nixon. He wrote a cheque but when he returned to the United States he had it cancelled. Rothman subsequently sued Smith for the money via a California collection agency, however Nixon interceded on his friend's behalf, writing a letter to the State Department seeking their help. Rothman lost when the dispute went to trial in a Los Angeles court.

He ran a bookmaking operation in Havana where he also was involved in running guns to Fidel Castro with Joe Merola and the Mannarino brothers, for which he was convicted February 4, 1960. Along with Lucien Rivard and Paul Mondoloni he was a co-owner of the El Morocco club in Camagüey. The American authorities reported that, with the help of Mondoloni and Trafficante, Rothman was moving between 50 and 150kg of heroin every three to six months from Cuba to the United States.

After Castro took power following the Cuban Revolution, Rothman began involvement in various anti-Castro efforts. He had fled Cuba, thereby avoiding arrest when a number of gangsters were rounded up by the Castro government. In August 1959 he supplied dynamite to Cuban exiles that were intending to blow up Cuban aircraft at the Miami International Airport. On another occasion he sold over 100 pounds of dynamite to a different group of exiles to blow up the Revolución newspaper office in Havana. He also assembled a mercenary air force to bomb Cuban agriculture in an attempt to destabilize its economy. In August 1959 deposed Cuban dictator Fulgencio Batista purchased the Biltmore Terrace Hotel in Miami Beach, Florida to serve as a headquarters for Cuban paramilitary operations against Castro. He hired Rothman as the hotel's manager. Rothman paid off the local police to look the other way and leave the Cubans to their own devices.

His anti-Castro activities led to various run-ins with the law. In October 1958 the mafia broke into an Ohio National Guard armory in Canton, Ohio. The weapon haul totaled 317 weapons valued at $25,000 and included M1 rifles, sub-machine guns, and two Browning machine guns. Rothman was indicted both for this robbery and for arranging the transport of the haul from western Pennsylvania to Florida and finally to Cuba.

Rothman's international ties encompassed also the Dominican Republic, counting among his friends the country's secret police chief. After the Dominican dictator Rafael Trujillo was double-crossed by the American William Morgan who was acting as a double agent on behalf of Castro, he put out a $500,000 bounty for his death. Rothman met with Rolando Masferrer on 23 August to discuss having the mafia kill Morgan, demanding $100,000 of the bounty in return. In the end Morgan was executed by Castro for counterrevolutionary activities.

After moving back to Miami, Rothman purchased a notable gangster hangout, The Albion Lounge, in the late 1960s and early 70s. He was also involved in narcotics trafficking in Miami. In 1962, he was acquitted for conspiracy to transport, and transporting, stolen securities. In 1969, he was arrested and indicted, and in 1971, he was convicted, of conspiracy relating to the theft of securities.

Rothman died aged 70 in October 1985. His son Cappy Rothman was a urologist who founded the California Cryobank.

== Criminal record ==
- 1/29/48 – Vagrancy – Miami Beach, Fla.
- 3/27/59 – Firearms Act violation – Miami, Fla.
- 4/05/59 – Stolen property – Pittsburgh, Penn. (sentenced to 5 years in prison in 1961)
- 5/01/62 – Receiving and transporting stolen property – Federal Correctional Inst., Tallahassee, Fla.
- 9/11/63 – Stolen property – Eglin Air Force Base prison camp, Okaloosa County, Fla.
- 3/17/69 – Vagrancy – Las Vegas, Nev.

== Associates ==
- Joe Merola
- Pasquale "Patsy" Erra
- Frank "Lefty" Rosenthal (of the movie "Casino" fame)
