= Badge 373 =

1973 film by Howard W. Koch

- Theatrical release poster
- Directed by: Howard W. Koch
- Written by: Pete Hamill
- Produced by: Howard W. Koch
- Starring: Robert Duvall; Verna Bloom; Henry Darrow; Eddie Egan
- Cinematography: Arthur J. Ornitz
- Edited by: John Woodcock
- Music by: J.J. Jackson
- Production company: Paramount Pictures
- Distributed by: Paramount Pictures
- Release date: July 25, 1973 (New York City)
- Running time: 116 minutes
- Country: United States
- Language: English
- Box office: $1,100,000 (US/ Canada rentals)

Badge 373 is a 1973 American neo noir crime action thriller film inspired, as was The French Connection, by the life and career of police officer Eddie Egan, here called "Eddie Ryan". The film, which has a screenplay by journalist Pete Hamill, was produced and directed by Howard W. Koch, and stars Robert Duvall as Ryan, with Verna Bloom, Henry Darrow and Eddie Egan himself as a police lieutenant.

The film was not successful, either at the U.S. box office or with the critics but was an overseas Box Office Success especially in Italy, France, Spain, West Germany and Australia.

== Plot ==
Eddie Ryan (Robert Duvall), a tough, no-nonsense, abrasive and racist Irish NYPD cop, has to turn in his badge after scuffling with a Puerto Rican suspect who then falls to his death from a rooftop, but that doesn't stop him from heading out on a one-man crusade to find out who killed his partner of three years, Gigi Caputo (Louis Cosentino), all the while neglecting his new live-in girlfriend, Maureen (Verna Bloom). Ryan's search leads him to Puerto Rican drug kingpin Sweet Willie (Henry Darrow), and a shipment of guns for Puerto Rican independentistas.

== Cast ==
- Robert Duvall as Eddie Ryan
- Verna Bloom as Maureen
- Henry Darrow as William Salazar a.k.a. Sweet William
- Eddie Egan as Lt. Scanlon
- Felipe Luciano as Ruben
- Tina Cristiani as Mrs. Caputo
- Marina Durell as Rita Garcia
- Chico Martinez as Frankie Diaz
- Jose Duval as Ferrer
- Louis Cosentino as Gigi Caputo
- Luis Avalos as Chico
- Nubia Olivero as Mrs. Diaz
- Sam Schacht as Assistant D.A.
- Edward F. Carey as The Commissioner
- "Big" Lee as Junkie in casino
- Duane Morris as Gay in casino
- John Marriott as Superintendent
- Joe Veiga as Manuel (Botica [sic] Proprietor)
- Mark Tendler as Harbor Lights bouncer
- Robert Weil as Hans
- Rose Ann Scamardella as Herself
- Pete Hamill as Reporter
- Larry Appelbaum as Copo at toll booth
- John McCurry as Bus driver
- Bob Farley as Patrolman
- Tracey Walter as Delivery boy
- John Scanlon, Jimmy Archer, Ric Mancini, Mike O'Dowd as Tugboat crew
- Robert Miano, Pompie Pomposello, Hector Troy as Sweet William's hoods
- Miguel Alejandro, Harry Collazo, Damian Colon as Ruben's gang
- Johnny Pacheco & his Orchestra as Band at Carorrojeno's
- Orestes Matacena as Drug Dealer
- Jimmie Walker as Drunk on stairs

Cast notes:

- Journalist Pete Hamill, who wrote the screenplay, has a bit part as a reporter named Pete, in the sequence of Gigi's wake, while WABC-TV anchorwoman Rose Ann Scamardella, later the inspiration for Gilda Radner's Saturday Night Live character "Roseanne Roseannadanna", plays herself in a cameo appearance.
- Dominican salsa bandleader and cofounder/musical director of Fania Records Johnny Pacheco & his Orchestra makes a cameo appearance in the opening nightclub sequence.

== Production ==
Badge 373 was shot on location on the streets of New York City. At one point, in what film writer Jeff Stafford calls a deliberate attempt to recall the car-chase scene from The French Connection, which was also based on the exploits of Eddie Egan, Robert Duvall as police detective Eddie Ryan attempts to chase down suspects in their car by hijacking a city bus, the 14th Street crosstown. The chase does not follow actual Manhattan geography, and passes locations including the West 125th viaduct and a meatpacking plant, and a branch of the record store King Karol at 460 West 42nd Street. Locations for other scenes include the Manhattan Bridge, with the World Trade Center's Twin Towers in the background, and the FDR Drive, with the United Nations headquarters visible.

On August 10, 1973, Paramount Pictures rejected a demand by the Puerto Rican Action Coalition to withdraw the film for what the coalition called the movie's racism.

== Crew ==
- Director: Howard Koch
- Producer: Howard Koch
- Screenplay: Pete Hamill
- Music composed and conducted by: J.J. Jackson
- Director of photography: Arthur J. Ornitz
- Editor: John Woodcock
- Associate producer: Lawrence Appelbaum
- Assistant to the producer: Irwin Yablans
- Inspired by the exploits of: Eddie Egan
- Art director: Philip Rosenberg
- Costumes: Frank Thompson
- Second unit director: Michael Moore
- Production manager: Jim DiGangi
- 1st assistant director: Michael P. Petrone
- 2nd assistant directors: Robert Grand, Gerrold T. Brandt, Jr.
- Technical advisor: Eddie Egan
- Script supervisor: Roberta Hodes
- Casting: Bernie Styles
- Set decorator: Edward Stewart
- Set dresser: Gary Brink
- Hair stylist: Vern Caruso
- Property master: Al Griswold
- Costumer: George Newman
- Special effects: Conrad Brink
- Sound recording: Dennis Maitland
- Re-recording: John Wilkinson

== Controversy ==
Puerto Ricans picketed the film claiming it was discriminatory against that group.

== Critical response ==
The critical reaction to Badge 373 was generally negative. In The New York Times, Roger Greenspun pointed out the biases of the film: "All of the evil is perpetrated by Puerto Ricans, either innocent but violent revolutionaries who run around shouting 'Puerto Rico Libre!' or the uninnocent but equally violent nonrevolutionaries who manipulate them. Against such forces, Eddie the hard-nosed cop has only the instincts of his personal bigotry to guide him. And invariably the instincts of his personal bigotry turn out to be right. ... [U]nless you care to hate Puerto Ricans (or Irish cops) I don't see how the movie can have anything for you". Variety called it "a ploddingly paced police meller with racist and fascist undertones ... Producer Howard W. Koch, doubling as director, demonstrates no visual style or energy and even allows the several obligatory chase sequences to dribble into tedium."

Roger Ebert of the Chicago Sun-Times was positive, giving the film three stars out of four and calling it "a tough movie with some interesting things to say about cops-and-robbers morality." Gene Siskel of the Chicago Tribune gave the film half of one star out of four, writing that it played "like a Mad magazine parody" of The French Connection, "only the filmmakers aren't kidding." Kevin Thomas of the Los Angeles Times wrote, "In short, Hamill has turned out a hack script. The result is a potboiler movie that, if anything, patronizes rather than illuminates its working-class hero despite the authenticity with which Duvall, always a fine actor, invests him." Gary Arnold of The Washington Post called it "a dull, shoddy spinoff" of The French Connection, adding that "Duvall's cop is a little cruder than Hackman's, and he also seems less capable. The lack of any originality in the characterization is a little embarrassing: 'Badge 373' seems to think it's different because Duvall insults Puerto Ricans, whereas Hackman insulted Negroes." John Gillett of The Monthly Film Bulletin compared Badge 373 unfavorably to Dirty Harry in that "unlike Siegel, Koch fails to put his hero's activities in any kind of perspective; and even though the violence is kept in check, its ambiguities leave a somewhat repellent taste. All in all, another deeply divided and scarcely reassuring addition to the movies' composite portrait of the American police force."

== See also ==
- List of American films of 1973
