= Marcel Francisci =

French politician and alleged criminal

- Born: 30 November 1919; Ciamannacce, France
- Died: 16 January 1982 (aged 62); Paris, France
- Occupations: Businessman and smuggler who allegedly controlled a drug trafficking ring supplying heroin from France to the United States.

Marcel Francisci (30 November 1919 – 16 January 1982) was a French politician and an alleged member of the Unione Corse who was accused of masterminding the French Connection drug network. As a young man, Francisci fought in World War II and was awarded the Croix de Guerre. Following the war, he developed a business empire that included casinos in Britain, France and Lebanon. Francisci served in the general council (conseil général) of the Corse-du-Sud (UDR) and was a member of the Civic Action Service (SAC), a Gaullist militia. He was assassinated in Paris in 1982.

== Biography ==
Marcel Francisci was born in Ciamannacce in 1919. As a young man, he fought with the Free French Forces in Italy during World War II and was awarded four medals for acts of heroism, including the Croix de Guerre. After the armistice with Italy, he was recruited into the Corsican Mafia by Jo Renucci and began smuggling cigarettes and silk stockings between Tangiers and Marseille. During this time, he also established narcotics contacts in various Arab countries.

In 1947 Renucci and Francisci became anti-Communist strongmen for the Rally of the French People (RDF), the forerunner of the present-day Gaullist Party (UDR). Seizing the opportunity, Francisci befriended members of the political coterie of Charles de Gaulle. Francisci's influence in the party grew with his bank account and he would later become a leader of the Gaullist Party in Corsica.

When Renucci died in November 1958, Francisci gained control of his criminal empire. Though Francisci was in charge, he returned to Paris and delegated authority of heroin distribution in Marseille to underlings. In Paris, Francisci spent much of his time befriending politicians and investing his wealth in casinos. He was the owner of a lucrative international gambling syndicate with lavish casinos in Paris, London and Beirut. He ran the prestigious Cercle Hausmann in Paris.

Throughout the 1960s, Francisci was supposedly involved in gangland wars in southern France. The first war occurred in 1963. The second war occurred between 1965 and 1967 against the powerful Guérini clan. At that time, the Guérini clan was the ruling dynasty of the Corsican Mafia and had systematically organized the smuggling of opium from Turkey and other Middle Eastern countries. The Guérini clan was led by Marseille mob boss Antoine Guérini and his underling Jean-Baptiste Andreani.

The latter gangland war was reportedly sparked by competition over casino revenues between Guérini and Francisci. The war silently continued for three years with little more than extended obituary notices in the French press. On 23 June 1967, two masked motorcyclists pumped eleven bullets into Antoine Guérini at a Marseille gas station. Weeks later, Francisci was nearly killed by snipers while leaving an election rally in favour of John Bozzi, a Gaullist candidate, in Ajaccio, Corsica, but he managed to escape. According to the French weekly newspaper L'Express, on 14 December 1967, two gangsters loyal to the Guérini clan tried to blow up Francisci's house with 220 pounds of TNT. The two men were blown to bits planting the bomb. On 21 June 1968, in Ajaccio, Corsica, Francisci was ambushed by five gunmen while dining at a restaurant. Although Francisci was miraculously unscathed, bystanders weren't as fortunate. One was killed, and five others were wounded. Four months later, the men who tried to kill Francisci were murdered in a Parisian bar by gunmen dressed as policemen. Ultimately, the Guérini clan was exterminated in the French underworld.

Later, Francisci became an elected official for the Gaullist Party in Corsica. In 1971, he and Paul Mondoloni were accused by police forces in the U.S. Bureau of Narcotics of being involved in the trafficking of heroin between Marseille and New York City.

On 16 January 1982, Francisci was killed in Paris, France. He was shot to death in the parking lot of the building where he lived as he was entering his car.

== Legacy ==
Although Francisci was alleged to be a fearsome Corsican godfather, he is favourably remembered in Corsica as a philanthropic businessman who funded the construction of roads, schools and clinics. Francisci's family has denied his alleged involvement in organized crime.

== See also ==
- List of unsolved murders (1980–1999)
