= Jimmy "Popeye" Doyle =

Detective Jimmy "Popeye" Doyle
- Detective Jimmy "Popeye" Doyle (Gene Hackman) in The French Connection.
- First appearance: The French Connection (1971)
- Last appearance: Popeye Doyle (1986)
- Portrayed by: Gene Hackman (films); Ed O'Neill (TV pilot)

In-universe information
- Full name: James "Jimmy" Doyle
- Nickname: Popeye
- Gender: Male
- Title: Detective
- Occupation: Police officer

Detective James R. ''Jimmy'' Doyle, better known as Jimmy "Popeye" Doyle is a fictional character portrayed by actor Gene Hackman in the films The French Connection (1971) and its sequel, French Connection II (1975), and by Ed O'Neill in the 1986 television film Popeye Doyle. Hackman won the Academy Award for Best Actor for his performance in The French Connection. The character is based on a real-life New York City police detective, Eddie Egan, who also appeared in the film as Walt Simonson, Doyle's supervisor. Doyle, as played by Hackman in The French Connection, is ranked number 44 as a hero on the AFI's 100 Years...100 Heroes and Villains list.

== The French Connection ==
In the 1971 movie The French Connection, Popeye is a rough police detective who routinely breaks the rules in an effort to catch criminals, in this case a group of French drug smugglers. On an individual basis, Popeye has many negative qualities; he is a racist, womanizing alcoholic who is often disrespectful to his superiors. Nevertheless, he is a dedicated officer leading the New York City Police Department's narcotics squad in drug arrests and is willing to do whatever it takes to lock up known drug dealers, even if it involves civilians. Near the end of the movie, Popeye accidentally kills Bill Mulderig (Bill Hickman), a federal agent with whom he previously had an argument. Undeterred by Mulderig's death, Popeye continues in pursuit of his foe.

== French Connection II ==
The 1975 sequel French Connection II follows Popeye as he pursues drug smuggler Alain Charnier (Fernando Rey) back to Marseille. Gene Hackman and Fernando Rey — the only two cast members to appear in both movies — reprised their roles as Popeye and Charnier. While the original movie was based on a true story, the sequel was entirely fictional.

== Legacy ==
- Popeyes Chicken & Biscuits founder Al Copeland said he named his fast-food chain after Popeye Doyle.
