= Paul Mondoloni =

French mobster

Paul Damien Mondoloni (c. September 27, 1916 – July 29, 1985), alias Monsieur Paul, was a Corsican mafioso who was an important figure of the French Connection. He was killed in 1985. He was the associate of Marcel Francisci.

Mondoloni began as a French colonial policeman in French Indochina. He fled France after pulling off a jewelry heist against the wife of the Aga Khan in 1952, eventually going to Cuba in September 1956, where he went by the name "Rolland Samuel". Here he married a local Cuban woman in order to gain dual citizenship. Mondoloni co-owned the El Morocco, a nightclub in Camagüey, Cuba, with Norman Rothman and Lucien Rivard. With Rivard and Jean Croce he was involved in narcotics trafficking, paying Cuban dictator Fulgencio Batista $20,000 per week. The American authorities reported that, with the help of Rothman and Santo Trafficante Jr., Mondoloni was moving between 50 and 150 kg of heroin every three to six months from Cuba to the United States.

Later he resided in Acapulco and Mexico City, where he continued his involvement in drug trafficking. At Acapulco he met up again with his old associate from Cuba, Lucien Rivard. Author Douglas Valentine describes Mondoloni as "the grand architect of Corsican drug trafficking in Mexico". In February 1970 he met with Meyer Lansky to discuss opening up new routes. Antranik Paroutian laundered his money through Swiss bank accounts.

Mondoloni was shot dead, aged 68, on the afternoon of 30 July 1985 on Cours Joseph-Thierry in downtown Marseille. Three men in a beige Renault 9 hit him nine times in the chest and head with high-caliber bullets. Two bystanders were injured. He is portrayed by the actor Gérard Darmon in the 2008 Canadian French film The American Trap.
