= King Karol =

Record store chain

- King Karol logo, 1971
- Industry: Retail
- Founded: 1952; 74 years ago
- Founder: Phil King; Ben Karol
- Defunct: sometime between 1987 and 1993
- Headquarters: New York, New York, U.S.
- Number of locations: 7
- Area served: Manhattan
- Products: Albums

King Karol was an American record store chain based in New York City, New York. Founded in 1952 by Ben Karol and Phil King, it grew into one of New York City's largest independent record retailers during the 1960s and 1970s, with locations throughout Manhattan and Queens. In addition to its retail stores, the company operated a mail-order record business. After gradually downsizing, the company closed by the early 1990s.

== History ==
King Karol was founded in 1952 by Ben Karol and Phil King. The company opened its first store at 111 West 42nd Street in Manhattan, where it quickly established itself as a destination for music records during the postwar expansion of the American recording history.

Beginning in the early 1960s, King Karol expanded throughout New York City. The company opened locations across Midtown Manhattan, including stores on West 34th Street, West 42nd Street, West 48th Street, Fifth Avenue, Third Avenue, and Broadway, as well as a branch in Flushing, Queens. In 1976, the flagship relocated to a larger store at 126 West 42nd Street.

During the 1970s, stores were also located at 940 Third Avenue, at 57th Street (1969–1980); 460 West 42nd Street, at 10th Avenue, in the West Side Airlines Terminal Building (1970.–1977); in Flushing, Queens, at 40-46 Main Street (1970–1980); 609 Fifth Avenue, at 49th Street, in the KLM Building (1971–1978); 1500 Broadway, at West 43rd Street in the National General Building, Times Square (1972–after 1987); 7 West 48th Street (1977–1981); and 1521 Third Avenue, at 86th Street (1979–after 1987).

King Karol by mid-1971 had outlets at 460 West 42nd Street, at the corner of 10th Avenue; 940 Third Avenue, at East 57th Street; 609at 49th Street, in the KLM Building; and, in Flushing, Queens, at 40-46 Main Street. Later, the chain opened at least one other location, at 1521 Third Avenue, at East 86th Street, and, by mid-1975, at 1500 Broadway, at West 43rd Street.

In 1981, Ben Karol experimented with record album rentals, similar to the then-emerging market for videocassette rental, after having studied successful record rental systems in Canada. He told an interviewer, "The record industry isn't that great these days. You sit around and think of ways to stimulate it, try to come up with ideas based on what similar product is doing. ... [T]he whole video tape business is now going rental".

A year later, in 1982, the chain had four stores and began to include a video tape rental service that was provided by an outside vendor. Ben Karol said 1987 he subleases the video department to an outside vendor saying that he is "still a records man".

Toward the end of 1982, the chain was reduced to three stores and the owners King and Karol were considering the possible sale of the remaining. Around this time, Tower Records was building a 34,000-square foot superstore in Manhattan and locally owned Sam Goody had recently sold itself to the parent of Musicland which made it possible for Sam Goody to expand nationally. King died shortly afterward, in 1983. By late 1984, Tower made it very difficult for small independents to compete.

By 1987, the company was down to two stores, from seven at its height. Ben Karol died in 1993 after a long illness.

King Karol also operated a mail order record business through P.O. Box 629, Times Square Station, New York, New York 10036.

King Karol closed at the beginning of 1985.

== Media ==
The King Karol branch at 460 West 42nd Street, with its lit sign in a nighttime scene, is visible during the bus-chase sequence in the 1973 New York City police film Badge 373, immediately before the bus crashes into an Army/Navy store. The name King Karol can be seen in the 2016 film Ghostbusters during the climactic scenes in Times Square when billboard advertisements revert to defunct brands.
