= Sans Souci Cabaret =

Former entertainment venue in Havana, Cuba

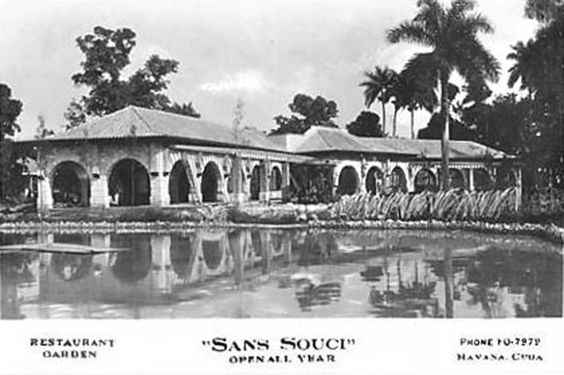
- Sans Souci

General information
- Type: Commercial
- Location: Arroyo Arenas, km 15, Avenida 51, Arroyo Arenas, Ciudad de La Habana, Cuba
- Coordinates: 23.058797°N 82.45669°W
- Closed: 1959
- Client: Gabriel "Kelly" Mannarino, Santo Trafficante Jr.

The Sans Souci was a nightclub within a natural environment and located on the outskirts of Havana. It had a restaurant and floor shows nightly that attracted a great number of tourists. Its greatest profits came from an amusement arcade operating in a small room next door to the Sans Souci that was not advertised since there was no official license for its exploitation.

In the early 1950s the club was purchased by the brothers Gabriel "Kelly" and Sammy Mannarino, both of the Pittsburgh Mafia. In April 1953 the Cuban government arrested a dozen North Americans who were suspected of running fraudulent games at the Sans Souci, and also the Tropicana Club and the Jockey Club. Eleven of them were deported. In 1955 it was purchased by Santo Trafficante Jr., mafia boss of the Trafficante crime family in Florida. Trafficante was a legal resident of Cuba, with his address listed at an apartment he had at the Sans Souci. Norman Rothman, who was manager for its previous owners the Mannarino brothers, stayed on as manager. R. D. Matthews of Texas also worked there. Chicago Outfit-linked criminals David Yaras and Leonard Patrick were reported to have possessed interests in the Sans Souci. The Sans Souci was destroyed by mobs in early January 1959 as Fidel Castro's rebel army overtook Havana. The casino was covered in kerosene and set alight.

The 1956 the Cabaret Yearbook describes the venue as "Usually run by Americans, Sans Souci Cabaret is located in a Spanish-type villa. Stage, dance floor and tables are under the moonlight. Shows, like at the other Big Three nightclubs, are production numbers with name acts. Good-looking U.S. showgirls are an added attraction. Sans Souci, as well as Tropicana and Montmartre, has a gambling room with roulette, craps and chemin de fer, etc. Located even further out than Tropicana, Sans Souci usually opens only for the winter season."

== Remodel ==
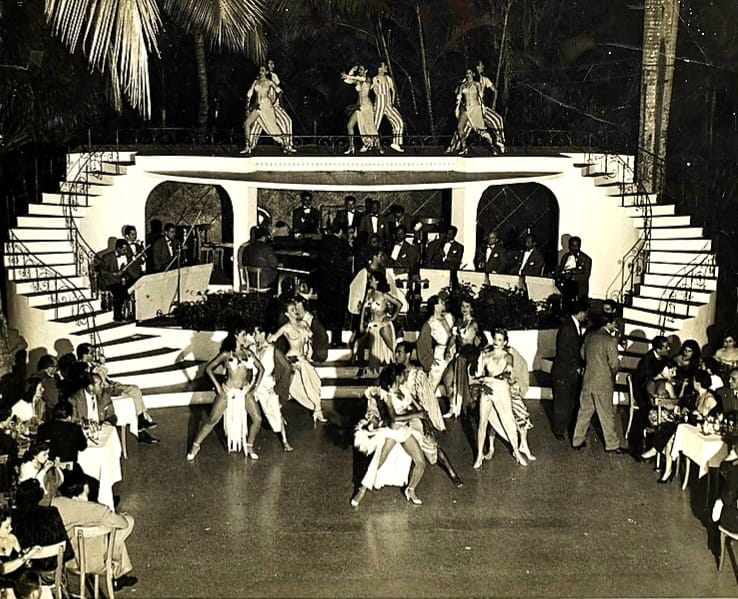
Orquesta y bailarines en Sans Souci, Havana, Cuba. Años de 1950s

Remodeling of the Sans Souci Cabaret started in 1955 at an approximate cost of one million dollars. The management of Norman “Roughneck” Rothman, a mafia associate who was married to the Cuban Olga Chaviano, a star at the Sans Souci between 1953 and 1955, preceded the management of William G. Buschoff, known as Lefty Clark, from Miami Beach, one of the men of Santo Trafficante Jr. A report by the Department of the Treasury written in Havana considered Buschoff a suspect of drug trafficking; Santo Trafficante was also a suspect.

The casino was destroyed by mobs in early January 1959 as Fidel Castro's rebel army overtook Havana.

== Razzle game ==
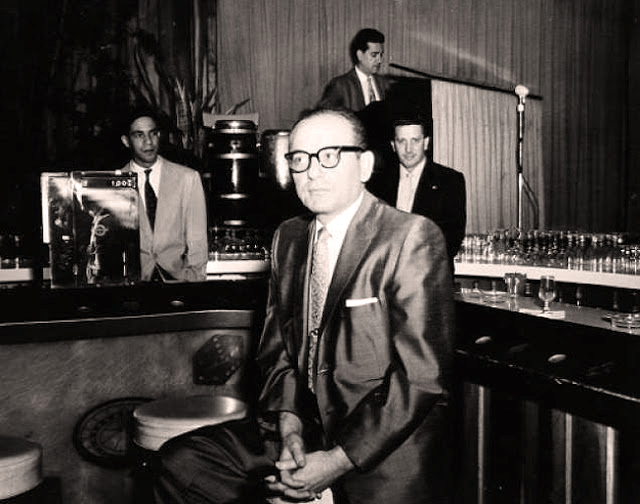
Santo Trafficante at the bar of the Sans Souci in 1955

Sometime in 1952 the venue installed a razzle game, a scam that had sometimes been presented as a gambling game on carnival midways. The player throws a number of marbles onto a grid of holes, and the numbers of those holes award points which it is suggested can be converted into prizes. In reality, it is almost impossible for a player to win enough points for the prize, but this is concealed by the game's unintuitive use of probability, and deceptive behavior on the part of the operator. Jay Mallin records the game being played with eight dice instead of marbles and holes, in Cuban nightclubs and casinos in the 1950s. (Note: The Razzle game was so successful at the Sans Souci that within a few months almost every Cuban nightclub in Havana had a Razzle game. The game was reported to be bringing in as much money for the clubs as all their other games combined, with an average profit of $7,000 each night (equivalent to $85,000 in 2025). After American tourists lost heavily at the game, one reportedly losing $30,000 in a single night (equivalent to $364,000 in 2025), complaints from the American embassy led the Cuban government to impose a five-hour shutdown of all casinos on New Year's Eve. Eventually president Fulgencio Batista ordered the shutdown of the game, and the deportation of eleven U.S. gamblers.)

== Gallery ==
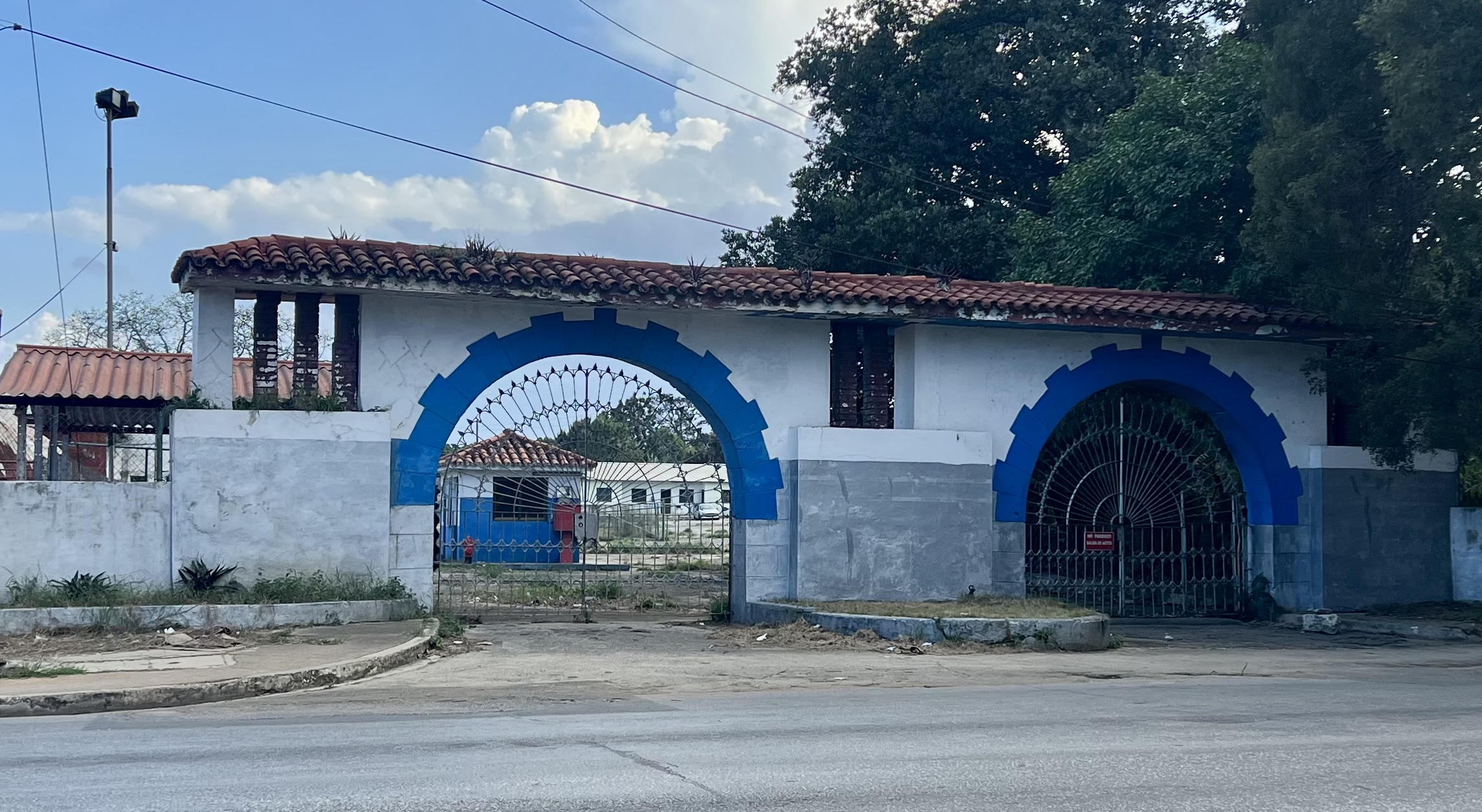
Entrance as of February 2023

== See also ==
- Havana Plan Piloto
- Havana Conference
