= Sonny Grosso =

American film and television producer (1930–2020)

- Born: Salvatore Anthony Grosso; July 21, 1930
- Died: January 22, 2020 (aged 89)
- Occupations: Film producer; television producer; detective

Salvatore Anthony Grosso (July 21, 1930 – January 22, 2020), known as Sonny Grosso, was an American film producer, television producer, and NYPD detective, noted for his role in the case made famous in the book and film versions of the French Connection.

== Early life ==
Grosso was born in 1930 in Düsseldorf, Germany. Moore wrote in The French Connection, that "[he] was an only son with three sisters. When his father, a truck driver, died suddenly at 37, Sonny, the eldest, became the head of the family at 15. He treated his sisters with fatherly care." Grosso recalled, "Even after our dad's untimely passing, our beloved mother, Lillian, never looked at another guy and would always put us first. She would act as if it was always 'Blue Skies' and 'My Blue Heaven', as her favorite performer Bing Crosby used to sing."

== The French Connection ==
Grosso, his partner Eddie Egan, and other NYPD detectives broke up an organized crime ring in 1961 and seized 112 pounds of heroin, a record amount at the time. The investigation was the subject of a book by Robin Moore and subsequent Academy Award-winning film, The French Connection, which won Oscars for Best Picture, Best Director, Best Actor, Best Film Editing, and Best Writing in 1971.

Egan and Grosso were technical advisers to the movie and played small roles. The movie was highly fictionalized, and a character based on Grosso, called Buddy "Cloudy" Russo, was played by actor Roy Scheider, who was nominated for an Academy Award for Best Supporting Actor for his performance. Like the character, Grosso's nickname as a detective was "Cloudy", due to his pessimism, as well as the fact that "Cloudy" is the opposite of "Sonny".

Egan's character, Jimmy "Popeye" Doyle, was played by Gene Hackman, who won the Academy Award for Best Actor.

Grosso recounted that his cop buddy, Egan, was nicknamed "Bullets" because he was "always firing his revolver in the air" for effect, but "Egan was the bravest cop I ever knew." Grosso continued the story, adding, "My beloved mother Lillian also had an insightful take on Egan, and would warn, 'I know Eddie's going to make sure you come home every night, but what I worry about is that one time, Egan might not come home.' Her comment was profound. And my pal Eddie was the greatest cop I ever worked with. God rest his soul!"

== Other work ==
Starting as a technical adviser on movies like The French Connection and The Godfather, while he was still working for the NYPD, Grosso learned the craft of filmmaking from people such as Oscar winners Philip D'Antoni, William Friedkin, and Francis Ford Coppola. While a technical advisor, he also played small roles in such groundbreaking movies as The French Connection, The Godfather, and The Seven-Ups.

In 1976, Grosso retired from the NYPD, and subsequently became a movie and TV producer, involved in many productions, including the 1970s cop shows Kojak and Baretta. Grosso actually helped revolutionize the role of the technical adviser/consultant for cop shows and movies, with film critic James Monaco once observing, "Sonny Grosso has had a hand in most of the major cop films and television series of the 1970s." Monaco also jokingly speculated that someday scholars would discuss "Grossovian subtexts" about the period's police dramas.

In the 1980s, he partnered with producer Larry Jacobson to set up Grosso-Jacobson Productions (aka Grosso-Jacobson Entertainment), which that in 1987, signed an agreement with Coca-Cola Telecommunications to develop four telemovies for syndication. That year, the company began diversifying their activities to encompass music and features as well as TV, with Grosso-Jacobson Entertainment set up as parent company for its holdings, namely Grosso-Jacobson Productions, as well as Grosso-Jacobson Music Publishing and other subsidiaries set to follow shortly, and partners made several appointments to join the company, namely Alan Wagner, who held the same position as executive vice president of the company and a new Los Angeles office headed by veteran television producer William D'Angelo.

From 1985 to 1989, Grosso also produced a TV series (filmed in Canada and rebroadcast on CBS) entitled Night Heat, starring Jeff Wincott and Scott Hylands.

In October 2007, Grosso produced a limited-engagement performance of Richard Vetere's Be My Love: The Mario Lanza Story with The Nassau Pops Symphony Orchestra, Louis Panacciulli conducting. The play was directed by Charles Messina and co-produced by Phil Ramone. It premiered at the Tilles Center in Greenvale, New York.

== Death ==
Grosso died on January 22, 2020, in Manhattan following an illness at the age of 89.

== Filmography ==
Year	Title	Role	Notes
1971	The French Connection	FBI Agent Clyde Klein	
1972	The Godfather	Cop Outside Hospital	Uncredited
1973	The Seven-Ups	Counterfeit Money Courier	Uncredited
1975	Report to the Commissioner	Detective #1	
1977	Contract on Cherry Street	Rhodes	
1980	Cruising	Detective Blasio	
