= Popeye Doyle (film) =

- Genre: Mystery; Crime; Drama; Thriller
- Written by: Richard Di Lello
- Directed by: Peter Levin
- Starring: Ed O'Neill; Candy Clark; Matthew Laurance; James Handy
- Theme music composer: Brad Fiedel
- Country of origin: United States
- Original language: English

Production
- Executive producer: Robert Singer
- Producer: Richard Di Lello
- Production locations: New York City; Toronto
- Cinematography: Reginald H. Morris
- Editors: Terence Anderson; Skip Schoolnik
- Running time: 97 minutes
- Production companies: December 3rd Productions; 20th Century Fox Television

Original release
- Network: NBC
- Release: September 7, 1986

Popeye Doyle is an American 1986 television film starring Ed O'Neill as New York City police detective Jimmy "Popeye" Doyle. It is a sequel to the feature films The French Connection (1971) and French Connection II (1975), in which Gene Hackman played Doyle; Hackman won the Academy Award for Best Actor for his performance in The French Connection. Popeye Doyle was originally intended as a pilot episode for a proposed series under that title, but the series was not picked up.

Popeye Doyle is based on a real New York City detective, Eddie Egan, who appears in The French Connection as Walt Simonson, Doyle's supervisor.

== Plot ==
New York City police Detective Jimmy "Popeye" Doyle investigates the case of a murdered model, which leads him on the trail of a gang of terrorists and a drug cartel of international smugglers.

== Cast ==
- Ed O'Neill as Detective Jimmy "Popeye" Doyle
- Matthew Laurance as Tony Parese
- James Handy as Lieutenant Gregory Paulus
- Candy Clark as Corinne Evans
- George De La Pena as Itan Kellerman / The Shadow (credited as George de la Pena)
- Audrey Landers as Jill Anneyard
- Nicholas Kadi as Auram Bardas / The Weasel
- Elias Zarou as Fahoud Nazzim
- Elizabeth Lennie as Toni
- Richard Monette as Patrick Henley
- Guy Sanvido as Sammy
- Chick Roberts as Detective Bender
- Joanne Perica as Connie Parese (credited as Joanna Perica)
- Alexandra Innes as Marta Rodriguez
- J.K. Simmons as Patrolman In Park (credited as Jonathan Simmons)
- Tony Rosato as Wise-Ass Reporter
- Todd Postlewaite as Manager of Club 1502
- Susan Diol as The Blonde
- Gary Tacon as Deli Bandit #1
- Phil Nelson as Deli Bandit #2
- Molly Johnson as Herself (uncredited)
- Norman Orenstein as Himself (uncredited)
