= The French Connection (film) =

1971 American film by William Friedkin

- Theatrical release poster
- Directed by: William Friedkin
- Screenplay by: Ernest Tidyman
- Based on: The French Connection by Robin Moore
- Produced by: Philip D'Antoni
- Starring: Gene Hackman; Fernando Rey; Roy Scheider; Tony Lo Bianco; Marcel Bozzuffi
- Cinematography: Owen Roizman
- Edited by: Gerald B. Greenberg
- Music by: Don Ellis
- Production companies: Philip D'Antoni Productions; Schine-Moore Productions
- Distributed by: 20th Century-Fox
- Release date: October 7, 1971 (United States)
- Running time: 104 minutes
- Country: United States
- Languages: English; French
- Budget: $1.8–2.2 million
- Box office: $75 million (worldwide theatrical rental)

The French Connection is a 1971 American neo-noir action thriller film directed by William Friedkin and starring Gene Hackman, Roy Scheider, and Fernando Rey. The screenplay, by Ernest Tidyman, is based on Robin Moore's 1969 book of the same name about narcotics detectives Eddie Egan and Sonny Grosso. It tells the story of their fictional counterparts, New York Police Department detectives Jimmy "Popeye" Doyle and Buddy "Cloudy" Russo, in pursuit of wealthy French heroin smuggler Alain Charnier (played by Rey).

At the 44th Academy Awards in April 1972, the film earned eight nominations and won five, for Best Picture, Best Actor (Hackman), Best Director, Best Film Editing, and Best Adapted Screenplay. It was also nominated for Best Supporting Actor (Scheider), Best Cinematography and Best Sound. Tidyman also received a Golden Globe Award nomination, a Writers Guild of America Award, and an Edgar Award for his screenplay. The film's commercial and critical success also propelled both Hackman and Scheider to leading man status. A sequel, French Connection II, followed in 1975, with Hackman and Rey reprising their roles.

The French Connection appeared on the American Film Institute's list of the best American films in 1998 and again in 2007, placing 70th the first time and 93rd the second. In 2005, the Library of Congress selected the film for preservation in the United States National Film Registry for being "culturally, historically or aesthetically significant".

== Plot ==
In Marseille, a man is shadowing Alain Charnier, who runs a heroin-smuggling syndicate. Charnier's hitman, Pierre Nicoli, murders the man. Charnier plans to smuggle US$32 million (equivalent to $189 million in 2025) worth of 89% pure heroin (Note: As described in the film, with the purchase price of US$0.5 million (equivalent to $3 million in 2025) to Charnier for the pure heroin being cut by Boca for street sale) into the United States by hiding it in the car of his unsuspecting friend, television personality Henri Devereaux, who is traveling to New York City by ship. In Brooklyn, police detectives Jimmy "Popeye" Doyle dressed as Santa Claus and Buddy "Cloudy" Russo stake out a bar known for drug trafficking. They later go out for drinks at the Copacabana. Popeye observes Salvatore "Sal" Boca and his wife, Angie, entertaining mobsters involved in narcotics. They tail the couple and establish a link between the Bocas and Joel Weinstock, a financier in the narcotics underworld. Popeye learns that a shipment of heroin will arrive soon. The detectives convince their supervisor to wiretap the Bocas' phones. Popeye and Cloudy are joined by federal agents Bill Mulderig and Clyde Klein.

Devereaux's vehicle arrives in New York City. Boca is in a hurry to make the purchase, but Weinstock urges patience, understanding they are being surveilled. Charnier realizes he is being surveilled as well, identifies Popeye as a detective, and escapes on a departing subway shuttle at Grand Central Station. To evade Popeye, he has Boca meet him in Washington, D.C., where Boca asks for a delay to avoid the police. Charnier wants to conclude the deal quickly. On the flight back to New York City, Nicoli offers to kill Popeye, but Charnier says Popeye would just be replaced by another policeman. Nicoli insists, however, saying they will be back in France before a replacement is assigned. Soon, Nicoli attempts to snipe Popeye in Brooklyn but hits a bystander. Popeye chases Nicoli, who boards an elevated subway train. Popeye shouts to a policeman on the train to catch Nicoli and then commandeers a passing car. He gives chase, crashing into several vehicles on the way.

Realizing he is being pursued, Nicoli shoots the policeman who tries to intervene and hijacks the train at gunpoint, shooting the conductor while forcing the motorman to drive through the next station. The motorman suffers a heart attack, and the train stop engages before it rear ends another train, hurling Nicoli to the floor. Popeye arrives and sees Nicoli descending from the platform. Nicoli sees Popeye and turns to run, but Popeye shoots him dead. After a long stakeout, Popeye impounds Devereaux's Lincoln. In a police garage, mechanics tear the car apart in a search for drugs, initially coming up empty-handed. Cloudy discovers that the car's weight was recorded at 120 pounds over its standard, implying that the contraband must still be in the car – packages of heroin are finally discovered beneath the rocker panels. The car is reassembled, despite being nearly destroyed, and returned to Devereaux who delivers it to Charnier.

Charnier drives to an old factory on Wards Island, where Boca's brother Lou works, to meet Weinstock and deliver the drugs. After Charnier has the rocker panel covers removed, Weinstock's chemist tests one of the bags and confirms its quality. Charnier removes the drugs and hides the money inside the rocker panels of another car purchased at a junk car auction, which he plans to take back to France. Charnier and Sal drive off in the Lincoln, but a large contingent of police led by Popeye blocks their path. The police chase the Lincoln back to the factory, where Boca is killed by Cloudy during a shootout. Most of the other criminals surrender. Charnier escapes into a nearby abandoned bakery with Popeye and Cloudy in pursuit. Popeye sees a shadowy figure in the distance and opens fire too late to heed a warning, killing Mulderig. Undaunted, he tells Cloudy he will get Charnier. He reloads his gun and runs into another room. A single gunshot is heard.

Title cards describe various characters' fates: Weinstock was indicted, but his case was dismissed for "lack of proper evidence"; Angie Boca received a suspended sentence for a misdemeanor; Lou Boca received a reduced sentence for conspiracy and possession of narcotics; Devereaux served four years in a federal penitentiary for conspiracy; Charnier was never caught and is believed to be living in France. Popeye and Cloudy were transferred out of the Narcotics Bureau and reassigned.

== Cast ==
- Gene Hackman as Jimmy "Popeye" Doyle (based on Eddie Egan)
- Fernando Rey as Alain Charnier (based on Jean Jehan)
- Roy Scheider as Buddy Russo (based on Sonny Grosso)
- Tony Lo Bianco as Sal Boca (based on Pasquale Fuca)
- Marcel Bozzuffi as Pierre Nicoli
- Frédéric de Pasquale as Devereaux
- Bill Hickman as Mulderig
- Ann Rebbot as Marie Charnier
- Harold Gary as Weinstock
- Arlene Farber as Angie Boca
- Eddie Egan as Simonson
- André Ernotte as La Valle
- Sonny Grosso as Klein
- Randy Jurgensen as Police Sergeant
- Alan Weeks as Pusher

== Production ==
National General Pictures was originally set to produce the film but dropped it, disliking the original script by Alex Jacobs. Richard Zanuck and David Brown offered to make it at Fox with a $1.5 million budget. The film came in $300,000 over budget, at $1.8 million.

The overall atmosphere, character characterization and narrative style are largely influenced by the French film Le Samouraï (1967) by Jean-Pierre Melville. William Friedkin was also inspired by Alain Delon's performance, where he plays a solitary and methodical hitman, to shape the character of Popeye Doyle (Gene Hackman).

In an audio commentary Friedkin recorded for the film's Collector's Edition DVD release, he says the film's documentary-like realism was the direct result of his having seen Costa-Gavras's Z. He describes Z's influence on The French Connection:

After I saw Z, I realized how I could shoot The French Connection. Because he shot Z like a documentary, it was a fiction film but it was made like it was actually happening—like the camera didn't know what was gonna happen next. And that is an induced technique. It looks like he happened upon the scene and captured what was going on as you do in a documentary. My first films were documentaries too, so I understood what he was doing, but I never thought you could do that in a feature at that time until I saw Z.

The film was among the earliest to show the World Trade Center: the completed North Tower and partially completed South Tower are seen in the background of scenes at the shipyard after Devereaux arrives in New York.

=== Casting ===
Though the cast proved to be one of the film's greatest strengths, Friedkin had problems with casting from the start. He strongly opposed Gene Hackman as the lead, first considering Paul Newman (too expensive), then Jackie Gleason, Peter Boyle, and the columnist Jimmy Breslin, who had never acted. The studio considered Gleason box-office poison after his film Gigot had flopped several years before, Boyle declined the role out of disapproval of the film's violence, and Breslin refused to get behind the wheel of a car, as Popeye does in an integral chase scene. Steve McQueen was also considered, but did not want to do another police film after Bullitt; moreover, as with Newman, his fee was too high. Charles Bronson was also considered for the role. Lee Marvin, James Caan, and Robert Mitchum were also considered; all turned it down. Friedkin almost settled for Rod Taylor (who had actively pursued the role, according to Hackman), another choice the studio approved, before going with Hackman.

The casting of Fernando Rey as Alain Charnier (irreverently called "Frog One" throughout the film) resulted from mistaken identity. Friedkin had seen Luis Buñuel's 1967 film Belle de Jour and been impressed by the performance of Francisco Rabal, who had a small role in it. But Friedkin did not know Rabal's name, remembering only that he was a Spanish actor. He asked his casting director to find the actor, and the casting director contacted Rey, a Spanish actor who had appeared in several other Buñuel films. Rabal was finally reached, but because he spoke neither French nor English, Rey was kept in the film.

=== Comparison to actual people and events ===
The plot centers on drug smuggling in the 1960s and early 1970s, when most of the heroin illegally imported into the East Coast came to the U.S. via France (see French Connection).

On April 26, 1968, a record-setting 246 lb (111.6 kg) of heroin was seized, concealed in a Citroën DS and smuggled to New York on the SS France ocean liner. The total amount smuggled during the DS's many transatlantic voyages was 1,606 lb (728.5 kg), according to arrested smuggler Jacques Bousquet.

Like its two protagonists, several of the film's other characters have real-life counterparts. Alain Charnier is based on Jean Jehan, who was later arrested in Paris for drug trafficking but not extradited, because France does not extradite its citizens. Sal Boca is based on Pasquale "Patsy" Fuca, and his brother Anthony. Angie Boca is based on Patsy's wife, Barbara, who later wrote a book with Robin Moore detailing her life with Patsy. The Fucas and their uncle were part of a heroin-dealing crew that worked with New York crime families.

Characters not prominently depicted in the film include the special agents and undercover operatives of the Federal Bureau of Narcotics (FBN), the federal agency primarily responsible for investigating the French Connection, who worked alongside NYPD detectives throughout most of these events until the FBN dissolved later in 1968.

Henri Devereaux, who takes the fall for importing the film's drug-laden Lincoln into New York, is based on Jacques Angelvin, a television actor arrested and sentenced to three to six years in a federal penitentiary for his role, serving about four before returning to France and turning to real estate. According to the director's commentary, Joel Weinstock is a composite of several similar drug-dealing financiers.

=== Car chase ===
The film is often cited as featuring one of the greatest car chase sequences in movie history. The chase involves Popeye commandeering a civilian's car (a 1971 Pontiac LeMans) and frantically chasing an elevated train on which a hitman is trying to escape. The scene, coordinated by Bill Hickman, was filmed in Bensonhurst, Brooklyn, roughly running under the BMT West End Line (now the D, R, and W trains, then the B train), which runs on an elevated track above Stillwell Avenue, 86th Street, and New Utrecht Avenue in Brooklyn, with the chase ending just north of the 62nd Street station. At that point, the train hits a train stop but is going too fast to stop in time and collides with the train ahead of it, which has just left the station. (Note: R42 cars 4572 and 4573 were chosen for the film and had no B subway rollsigns because they were normally assigned to the N subway train. Consequently, they operated during the movie with an N displayed. As of July 2009, these cars were withdrawn from service, but are preserved as part of the New York Transit Museum fleet.)

The scene's most famous shot is from a front bumper mount and shows the streets from a low angle. Director of photography Owen Roizman wrote in American Cinematographer magazine in 1972 that the camera was undercranked to 18 frames per second to enhance the sense of speed; this effect can be seen on a car at a red light whose exhaust pipe is pumping smoke at an accelerated rate. Other shots involved stunt drivers who were supposed to barely miss Doyle's car but, due to errors in timing, accidental collisions occurred that were left in the film. Friedkin said he used Santana's cover of Peter Green's song "Black Magic Woman" during editing to help shape the chase sequence. The song does not appear in the film, but the chase scene "did have a sort of pre-ordained rhythm to it that came from the music".

The scene concludes with Doyle confronting Nicoli at the stairs leading to the elevated train track and shooting him as he tries to run back up them, as captured in a still shot used in a theatrical release poster for the film. Many of the police officers who were advisers for the film objected to the scene on the grounds that shooting a suspect in the back is murder, not self-defense, but Friedkin stood by it, saying he was "secure in my conviction that that's exactly what Eddie Egan [the model for Doyle] would have done, and Eddie was on the set while all of this was being shot".

=== Filming locations ===
The French Connection was filmed at the following locations:

- 50th Street and First Avenue, New York City (where Doyle waits outside the restaurant)
- 82nd Street and Fifth Avenue (near the Metropolitan Museum of Art), New York City (Weinstock's apartment)
- 86th Street, Brooklyn, New York City (the chase scene)
- 91 Wyckoff Avenue, Bushwick, Brooklyn (Sal and Angie's Cafe)
- 940 2nd Avenue, Manhattan (where Charnier and Nicoli buy fruit and Popeye is watching)
- 177 Mulberry Street, Little Italy, New York City (where Sal makes a drop)
- Avenue De L'Amiral Ganteaume, Cassis, Bouches-du-Rhône, France (Charnier's house)
- Château d'If, Marseille, Bouches-du-Rhône, France (where Charnier and Nicoli meet Devereaux)
- Chez Fon Fon, Rue Du Vallon Des Auffes, Marseille (where Charnier dines)
- Columbia Heights, Squibb Hill, Brooklyn, New York City (where Sal parks the Lincoln)
- Le Copain, 891 First Avenue, New York City (where Charnier dines)
- Doral Park Avenue Hotel (now 70 Park Avenue Hotel), 38th Street and Park Avenue, New York City (Devereaux's hotel)
- Dover Street, near the Brooklyn Bridge, New York City (where Sal leaves the Lincoln)
- Forest Avenue and Putnam Avenue, Ridgewood, Queens, New York City
- 42nd Street Shuttle platform at Grand Central Terminal, New York City
- Henry Hudson Parkway Route 9A at Junction 24 (car accident)
- Marlboro Housing Project, Avenues V, W, and X off Stillwell Avenue, Brooklyn, New York City (where Popeye lives)
- Montee Des Accoules, Marseille
- Onderdonk Avenue, Ridgewood, Queens, New York City
- Plage du bestouan, Cassis
- Putnam Avenue between Fresh Pond Road and Forest Avenue, Ridgewood, Queens, New York City
- Randalls Island, East River, New York City
- Ratner's Restaurant, 138 Delancey Street, New York City (where Sal and Angie emerge)
- Remsen Street, Brooklyn, New York City (where Charnier and Nicoli watch the car being unloaded)
- Rio Piedras (now demolished), 912 Broadway, Brooklyn, New York City (where the Santa Claus chase starts)
- Rapid Park Garage, East 38th Street near Park Avenue, New York City (where Cloudy follows Sal)
- Ronaldo Maia Flowers, 27 East 67th Street, New York City (where Charnier gives Popeye the slip)
- The Roosevelt Hotel, 45th Street and Madison Avenue, New York City
- Rue des Moulins off Rue Du Panier, Old Town of Marseille (where the French policeman with the bread walks)
- La Samaritaine at 2 Quai Du Port, Marseille
- South Street at Market Street at the foot of Manhattan Bridge, New York City (where Doyle emerges from a bar)
- Triborough Bridge to Randall's Island toll bridge at the east end of 125th Street, New York City
- Wards Island, New York City (the final shootout)
- The National Mall in Washington, D.C., near The Capitol (where Charnier and Sal meet)
- Westbury Hotel, 15 East 69th Street, New York City (Charnier's hotel)

== Reception ==
Roger Greenspun of The New York Times wrote: The French Connection "is in fact a very good new kind of movie, and that in spite of its being composed of such ancient material as cops and crooks, with thrills and chases, and lots of shoot-'em-up." Variety wrote: "So many changes have been made in Robin Moore's taut, factual reprise of one of the biggest narcotics hauls in New York police history that only the skeleton remains, but producer Philip D'Antoni and screenwriter Ernest Tidyman have added enough fictional flesh to provide director William Friedkin and his overall topnotch cast with plenty of material, and they make the most of it." Gene Siskel of the Chicago Tribune awarded the film four stars out of four and wrote: "From the moment a street-corner Santa Claus chases a drug pusher thru the Bedford-Stuyvesant section of Brooklyn, to the final shootout on deserted Ward's Island, The French Connection is a gutty, flatout thriller, far superior to any caper film of recent vintage."

Charles Champlin of the Los Angeles Times called the film "every bit as entertaining as Bullitt, a slam-bang, suspenseful, plain-spoken, sardonically funny, furiously paced melodrama. But because it has dropped the romance and starry glamor of Steve McQueen and added a strong sociological concern, The French Connection is even more interesting, thought-provoking and reverberating." Gary Arnold of The Washington Post called it "an undeniably sensational movie, a fast, tense, explosively vicious little cops-and-robbers enterprise" with "a deliberately nervewracking, runaway quality ... It's a cheap thrill in the same way that a roller coaster ride is a cheap thrill. It seems altogether appropriate that the showiest sequence intercuts between a runaway train and a recklessly speeding car." In his book Reverse Angle, John Simon wrote: "Friedkin has used New York locations better than anyone to day," "[t]he performances are all good", and "Owen Roizman's cinematography, grainy and grimy, is a brilliant rendering of urban blight."

Pauline Kael's review in The New Yorker was generally unfavorable. She wrote: "It's not what I want not because it fails (it doesn't fail), but because of what it is. It is, I think, what we once feared mass entertainment might become: jolts for jocks. There's nothing in the movie that you enjoy thinking about afterward—nothing especially clever except the timing of the subway-door-and-umbrella sequence. Every other effect of the movie—even the climactic car-versus-runaway-elevated-train chase—is achieved by noise, speed, and brutality."

In a 1971 essay titled Urban Gothic, Kael did have a few positive things to say about the film including calling it "well-made" and a film that "gets the audience sky-high and keeps it there." She goes on to write that the film "is probably the best example of what trade reporters sometimes refer to as 'the cinema du zap.'"

=== Retrospectives and influence ===
David Pirie of The Monthly Film Bulletin called the film "consistently exciting" and Gene Hackman "extremely convincing as Doyle, trailing his suspects with a shambling determination; but there are times when the film (or at any rate the script) seems to be applauding aspects of his character which are more repulsive than sympathetic," citing what appear to be instances of police brutality. Roger Ebert of the Chicago Sun-Times gave the film four out of four stars in a retrospective review, saying The French Connection was essentially a non-stop chase scene and left audiences feeling stunned by its relentless energy.

On Rotten Tomatoes, the film has an approval rating of 97% based on 93 reviews, with an average rating of 8.80/10. The site's critical consensus reads: "Realistic, fast-paced and uncommonly smart, The French Connection is bolstered by stellar performances by Gene Hackman and Roy Scheider, not to mention William Friedkin's thrilling production." On Metacritic, the film has a score of 94/100 based on reviews from 18 critics, indicating "universal acclaim". In a retrospective review, critic Mike Cormack said, "In The French Connection, the urban architecture and moral architecture are equivalent. The teeming streets, the subway trains, the urban bars busy all day, the graffiti-covered alleyways: this is an economy that runs on sweat, toil, and low land values... The point is not their incompetence but economic friction: when goods still have weight and cash still has to move, power has fingerprints, and that makes it vulnerable."

In 2014, Time Out listed The French Connection as the 31st-best action film of all time, according to a poll of film critics, directors, actors, and stunt actors.

Some writers have called The French Connection a neo-noir film.

The Japanese filmmaker Akira Kurosawa cited The French Connection as one of his favorite films.

Director David Fincher cited The French Connection as one of the five films that "had a Profound Impact on my Life" and served as an important influence on the cinematography on his film Seven; Brad Pitt cited The French Connection as a reason he participated in Seven.

Director Steven Spielberg has said he studied The French Connection in preparation for his historical action thriller film Munich.

== Awards and nominations ==
Award	Category	Nominee(s)	Result	Ref.
Academy Awards	Best Picture	Philip D'Antoni	Won	
Academy Awards	Best Director	William Friedkin	Won	
Academy Awards	Best Actor	Gene Hackman	Won	
Academy Awards	Best Supporting Actor	Roy Scheider	Nominated	
Academy Awards	Best Screenplay – Based on Material from Another Medium	Ernest Tidyman	Won	
Academy Awards	Best Cinematography	Owen Roizman	Nominated	
Academy Awards	Best Film Editing	Gerald B. Greenberg	Won	
Academy Awards	Best Sound	Christopher Newman and Theodore Soderberg	Nominated	
American Cinema Editors Awards	Best Edited Feature Film	Gerald B. Greenberg	Nominated	
Belgrade Film Festival	Best Film	Philip D'Antoni	Won	
British Academy Film Awards	Best Film	Philip D'Antoni	Nominated	
British Academy Film Awards	Best Direction	William Friedkin	Nominated	
British Academy Film Awards	Best Actor in a Leading Role	Gene Hackman (also for The Poseidon Adventure)	Won	
British Academy Film Awards	Best Film Editing	Gerald B. Greenberg	Won	
British Academy Film Awards	Best Sound	Christopher Newman and Theodore Soderberg	Nominated	
David di Donatello Awards	Best Foreign Film	Philip D'Antoni	Won	
Directors Guild of America Awards	Outstanding Directorial Achievement in Motion Pictures	William Friedkin	Won	
Edgar Allan Poe Awards	Best Motion Picture	Ernest Tidyman	Won	
Golden Globe Awards	Best Motion Picture – Drama		Won	
Golden Globe Awards	Best Actor in a Motion Picture – Drama	Gene Hackman	Won	
Golden Globe Awards	Best Director – Motion Picture	William Friedkin	Won	
Golden Globe Awards	Best Screenplay – Motion Picture	Ernest Tidyman	Nominated	
Golden Reel Awards	Best Sound Editing – Feature Film		Won	
Grammy Awards	Best Instrumental Arrangement	Don Ellis – "Theme from The French Connection"	Won	
Kansas City Film Critics Circle Awards	Best Film		Won	
Kansas City Film Critics Circle Awards	Best Actor	Gene Hackman	Won (Note: Tied with Walter Matthau for Kotch)	
National Board of Review Awards	Top Ten Films		4th Place	
National Board of Review Awards	Best Actor	Gene Hackman	Won	
National Film Preservation Board	National Film Registry		Inducted	
National Society of Film Critics Awards	Best Actor	Gene Hackman	Nominated	
New York Film Critics Circle Awards	Best Film		Runner-up	
New York Film Critics Circle Awards	Best Actor	Gene Hackman	Won	
Online Film & Television Association Awards	Film Hall of Fame: Productions		Inducted	
Writers Guild of America Awards	Best Drama – Adapted from Another Medium	Ernest Tidyman	Won	

The American Film Institute recognizes The French Connection on several of its lists:

- AFI's 100 Years...100 Movies - #70
- AFI's 100 Years...100 Movies (10th Anniversary Edition) - #93
- AFI's 100 Years…100 Thrills - #8
- AFI's 100 Years…100 Heroes and Villains: Jimmy "Popeye" Doyle - #44 Hero

In 2012, the Motion Picture Editors Guild listed the film as the tenth best-edited film of all time based on a survey of its membership.

== Home media releases ==
The French Connection has been issued in various home video formats. In 2001, it was released on VHS and DVD in box sets featuring both the film and its sequel, French Connection II. For a 2009 reissue on Blu-ray, Friedkin controversially altered the film's color timing to give it a "colder" look. Cinematographer Owen Roizman, who was not consulted about the changes, called the new transfer "atrocious". In 2012, a new Blu-ray transfer of the movie was released whose color timing both Friedkin and Roizman supervised; the 2009 edition's desaturated and sometimes grainy look was corrected.

In 2023, media publications discovered that a version of the film available on digital platforms such as Apple TV and the Criterion Channel had been altered to excise a scene that contains racial slurs. The decision received backlash from fans and cineasts, who compared the censorship to vandalism and called out the decision for hiding its historical context. Joseph Wade compared the cut to vandalising a piece of art.

== Sequels and adaptations ==
- French Connection II (1975) is a fictional sequel.
- NBC-TV aired a made-for-TV movie, Popeye Doyle (1986), another fictional sequel, starring Ed O'Neill.

== See also ==
- Crime film
- List of American films of 1971
- Popeyes Louisiana Kitchen, a fried chicken restaurant chain that was founded in 1972 and had its name inspired by the Popeye Doyle character in the film
- Federal Bureau of Narcotics

== Bibliography ==
- Berliner, Todd. "The Genre Film as Booby Trap: 1970s Genre Bending and 'The French Connection'." Cinema Journal (2001): 25–46. online
- Collins, Dave (November 29, 2014). "Man linked to heroin ring in '71 film nabbed again". Associated Press.
- Friedkin, William (April 15, 2003). "Under the Influence: The French Connection". DGA Magazine.
- Friedkin, William (Fall 2006). "Anatomy of a Chase: The French Connection". DGA Magazine.
- Friedkin, William (2013). The Friedkin Connection. New York: HarperCollins. ISBN 9780061775147.
- Kehr, Dave (February 20, 2009). "Filmmaking at 90 Miles Per Hour: A 2009 retrospective". The New York Times.
- King, Neal, Rayanne Streeter, and Talitha Rose. "Cultural Studies Approaches to the Study of Crime in Film and on Television." Oxford Research Encyclopedia of Criminology and Criminal Justice (2016). online
- Lichtenfeld, Eric. Action speaks louder: Violence, spectacle, and the American action movie (Wesleyan University Press, 2007).
- Ramaeker, Paul. "Realism, revisionism and visual style: The French Connection and the New Hollywood policier." New Review of Film and Television Studies 8.2 (2010): 144–163. online
