= Pasquale Fuca =

American mafia member (1932–1999)

Pasquale “Patsy” Fuca
- Born: October 22, 1932
- Died: April 15, 1999 (aged 66)
- Occupation: Mobster (Lucchese crime family)
- Known for: Role in heroin-trafficking operation "French Connection"

Pasquale "Patsy" Fuca (October 22, 1932 - April 15, 1999) was an American mobster in the Lucchese crime family of New York City. He was born and raised in Brooklyn. He is the man that Salvatore "Sal" Boca was based on in the 1971 film, The French Connection. He was married to his wife, Barbara, for 9 years until their divorce in 1962. She later went on to write a book about her experiences being married to a mobster with author Robin Moore. He was the owner of a small greasy spoon luncheonette in Brooklyn when the NYPD first started to target him. He is the nephew of fellow Lucchese crime family member, Angelo "Little Angie" Tuminaro, who was ranked 49th on Fortune's "50 Biggest Mafia Bosses" list in 1986.
