= French Connection II =

1975 film by John Frankenheimer

- Theatrical release poster
- Directed by: John Frankenheimer
- Screenplay by: Alexander Jacobs; Robert Dillon; Laurie Dillon
- Story by: Robert Dillon; Laurie Dillon
- Based on: The French Connection; 1971 film by William Friedkin
- Produced by: Robert L. Rosen
- Starring: Gene Hackman; Fernando Rey; Bernard Fresson
- Cinematography: Claude Renoir
- Edited by: Tom Rolf
- Music by: Don Ellis
- Production company: 20th Century-Fox
- Distributed by: 20th Century-Fox
- Release date: May 21, 1975
- Running time: 119 minutes
- Country: United States
- Languages: English; French
- Budget: $4.3 million
- Box office: $12.5 million

French Connection II is a 1975 American neo-noir action thriller film starring Gene Hackman and directed by John Frankenheimer. It is a sequel to the 1971 film The French Connection, and continues the story of the central character, Detective Jimmy "Popeye" Doyle, who travels to Marseille in order to track down French drug-dealer Alain Charnier, played by Fernando Rey, who escaped at the end of the first film. Hackman and Rey are the only returning cast members.

The film was released on May 21 1975, received positive reviews from critics and did good at the box office.

== Plot ==
Picking up four years after The French Connection left off, New York City police officer Jimmy "Popeye" Doyle still searches for elusive drug kingpin Alain Charnier. The department sends him to Marseille to track down Charnier. Once there, Doyle is met by English-speaking Inspector Henri Barthélémy, who resents his rude, nasty crimefighting demeanor. Having read Doyle's personnel file, Henri informs him that it is strictly forbidden for visiting police officers from other countries to carry firearms.

Later, while observing a beach volleyball match, Doyle is spotted by Charnier from a restaurant below. Determined to find Charnier on his own, Popeye has eluded two French police escorts assigned to keep watch on him. Doyle doesn't understand until later that he is being used as bait by French police to lure Charnier out of hiding. Later that same night, Charnier's men capture Doyle and take him to a seedy hotel for interrogation.

For several weeks, Doyle is repeatedly injected with heroin. In the meantime, Barthélémy orders a city-wide search for Doyle, while Charnier interrogates the captive detective about what he knows. Doyle responds he was sent there because he is the only one who can recognize him. Charnier believes Doyle, and releases him after one massive injection. Doyle is dumped, barely alive but addicted, in front of police headquarters. In his effort to save both Doyle's life and reputation, Barthélémy quarantines Doyle in a police cell so he can begin his cold turkey withdrawal from heroin.

After recovering from his withdrawal, Doyle searches Marseille and, finding the hideout he was brought to, sets it on fire. He breaks into a room and discovers Charnier's henchmen, whom he pursues and interrogates as to Charnier's whereabouts. He discovers that a delivery of opium is ongoing at the harbor. Doyle, Barthélémy, and other inspectors rush there and engage Charnier's henchmen in a gun battle. Then the criminals open a series of spillways and water rushes in, trapping Doyle and Barthélémy. The latter almost drowns, but Doyle manages to rescue him.

French police want Doyle sent back home, but Doyle convinces Barthélémy, who "owes him one", to keep watch over the ship. They eventually spot the ship's captain on his way to meet Charnier's lieutenant Jacques, whom Doyle recognizes. A tipoff ensues taking the police to the drug warehouse, which they raid, but are met with a barrage of fire. Doyle picks up a gun and kills a gangster machine-gunning them. Jacques and other men escape with the drugs on board a van, but Barthélémy closes the warehouse door and stops them. Meanwhile, once again Charnier has escaped. Doyle makes an exhausting foot chase of Charnier, who is sailing out of the harbor on his yacht. After spotting Charnier in the distance, Doyle catches up with the vessel at the end of the pier, takes his gun out of his holster, and calls Charnier's name. A surprised Charnier turns and is shot dead by Doyle.

== Cast ==
- Gene Hackman as NYPD Detective Jimmy "Popeye" Doyle
- Fernando Rey as Alain "Frog One" Charnier
- Bernard Fresson as Inspector Henri Barthélémy
- Philippe Léotard as Jacques
- Ed Lauter as General William Brian
- Charles Millot as Miletto
- Jean-Pierre Castaldi as Raoul Diron
- Cathleen Nesbitt as Old Lady
- André Penvern as André
- Samantha Llorens as Denise
- Reine Prat as Beach Girl
- Raoul Delfosse as Dutch Captain

== Production ==
John Frankenheimer had lived in France for a number of years when he agreed to make the film:

I like the script, I like the characters, I like the Hackman character in France and not speaking a word of French. It's a very difficult film because we want in no way to rip off the first one, which is one of the best films I've ever seen. I want to make a movie that stands on its own as a movie.

Frankenheimer also admitted he made the film in part because of the financial failure of The Impossible Object. "I want to make pictures that one sees", he said. "There's a great public out there and you have to reach them; otherwise you're not in the movie business." Prior to production beginning, Frankenheimer brought in Pete Hamill to re-write all of the dialogue. William Friedkin stated that he never had an interest in doing a sequel to the film and also never watched the film.

== Score ==
The music was composed and conducted by Don Ellis, who returned from the original film. A soundtrack CD was released by Film Score Monthly in 2005 and paired with the music from the first film.

== Reception ==
On release, French Connection II attracted positive reactions from the press and fared well at the box office, though nowhere near as well as its predecessor. The review aggregator Rotten Tomatoes gives the film a score of 83% based on 40 reviews. The consensus summarizes: "Flawed and more conventional than its predecessor, French Connection II still offers a wealth of dynamic action and gritty characterizations." Metacritic, which uses a weighted average, assigned the film a score of 68 out of 100, based on 9 critics, indicating "generally favorable" reviews.

Roger Ebert of the Chicago Sun-Times gave the film two and a half out of four stars, feeling that Detective Jimmy "Popeye" Doyle's heroin detox sequence halfway through the film, while well-acted by Hackman, stripped the film's momentum. He said that "if Frankenheimer and his screenplay don't do justice to the character (of Det. Jimmy "Popeye" Doyle), they at least do justice to the genre, and this is better than most of the many cop movies that followed The French Connection into release."

Vincent Canby wrote in his review in The New York Times, "Popeye is a colorful and interesting—though hardly noble—character, and when the Marseille drug people kidnap him, forcibly create a heroin habit in him, and then release him, you have a very special kind of jeopardy that the film and Mr. Hackman exploit most effectively."

Arthur D. Murphy of Variety called the film "an intelligent action melodrama" with a performance from Hackman that was so "excellent" as to "suggest the possibility of winning another major award for the same character in a sequel film."

Gene Siskel of the Chicago Tribune awarded three stars out of four and wrote, "Too many Popeye histrionics turns one of the screen's more compelling characters into a bit of a cartoon. And when Hackman is shot full of heroin by the Frenchman's thugs, once again the action is overplayed ... Despite these objections, French Connection II concludes with a wallop that argues persuasively for its being seen."

Paul D. Zimmerman wrote in Newsweek that Doyle's drug addiction in the middle of the film "stalls the story" and that the action-packed climax "seems executed for those seeking the shoot-'em-up sequel that Frankenheimer apparently wanted to avoid. If the movie ultimately doesn't work, this can be said in Frankenheimer's defense: that, with every right and probably much pressure to do so, he refused to rip off The French Connection as so many films with other names already had."

Charles Champlin of the Los Angeles Times wrote, "French Connection II is an audience picture, bold and vigorous, opting for action rather than nuance. There is none of the lingering irony of French Connection I. Vivid characterizations and plot are all, and they are whiz-bang."

Gary Arnold of The Washington Post wrote that "this is not a sequel that was really crying to be made ... John Frankenheimer's direction of French Connection II isn't bad, but it also isn't ingenious or exciting enough to compensate for the perfunctory screenwriting."

French Connection II earned North American rentals of $5.6 million, surpassing its $4.3 million budget. On the DVD commentary of the film, lead actor Gene Hackman remarked that the disappointing box office may have been due to the four-year gap between releases of the original and its sequel.

In 2009, Empire rated French Connection II to be the 16th greatest film sequel.

== See also ==
- List of American films of 1975
