= Bill Hickman =

American actor, stunt driver, stunt coordinator (1921–1986)

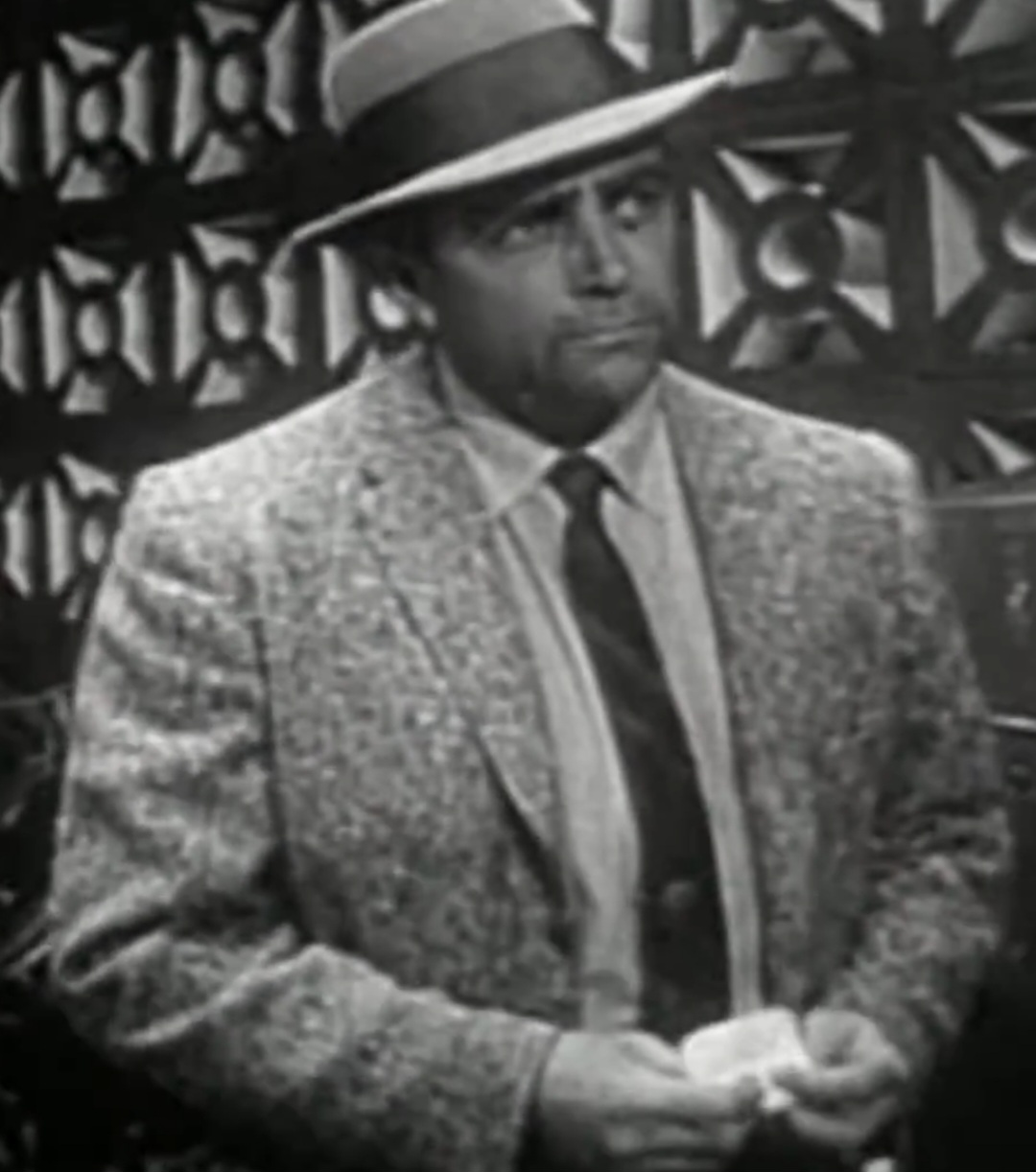
- Hickman in an episode of Lock-Up (1960)
- Born: William Hickman; January 25, 1921; Los Angeles County, California, U.S.
- Died: February 24, 1986 (aged 65); Indio, California, U.S.
- Occupations: Stunt driver, actor, stunt coordinator
- Years active: 1943–1973
- Known for: Bullitt, The French Connection, The Seven-Ups

William Hickman (January 25, 1921 – February 24, 1986) was an American professional stunt driver, stunt coordinator and actor. His film career spanned from the 1950s through to the late 1970s, and included films such as Bullitt, The French Connection and The Seven-Ups.

== Early career and James Dean ==
Bill Hickman was already an established stuntman by the time The Wild One was being filmed and his expertise on motorcycles landed him work on the Stanley Kramer production. At some point during the project, Hickman was injured and was unable to continue. It is never clear whether he was hurt while filming a stunt for the movie, although one account (by the late Clyde Earl) had him taking a spill in a motorcycle race not connected with the film. However, Hickman is clearly shown in several of the publicity stills from The Wild One.

Hickman spent some of these earlier days as driver and friend to James Dean, driving Dean's Ford station wagon towing Dean's famed 550 Spyder nicknamed "Little Bastard", and often helping and advising him with his driving technique. He was driving the Ford station wagon and trailer following Dean on the day of Dean's fatal 1955 accident and was the first person on the scene.

Hickman was an extra in Dean's 1951 feature movie debut, Fixed Bayonets!. A rare personal quote from Bill on his friendship with Dean: "In those final days, racing was what he cared about most. I had been teaching him things like how to put a car in a four-wheel drift, but he had plenty of skill of his own. If he had lived he might have become a champion driver. We had a running joke, I'd call him Little Bastard and he'd call me Big Bastard. I never stop thinking of those memories."

In another interview with James Dean expert Warren Beath, Hickman is quoted as saying, "We were about two or three minutes behind him. I pulled him out of the car, and he was in my arms when he died, his head fell over. I heard the air coming out of his lungs the last time. Didn't sleep for five or six nights after that, just the sound of the air coming out of his lungs."

== Stuntman work in Bullitt ==
While Hickman had many small acting (mainly driving) parts throughout the 1950s and 1960s, he worked primarily as a stuntman. He sustained a couple of significant injuries during this time, including breaking several ribs in a bad trick-fall in the film How to Stuff a Wild Bikini (1965). However, it was the car chase alongside Steve McQueen in the 1968 film Bullitt for which he is usually remembered. Hickman was to do all his own driving; portraying one of two hit men, he drove an all black 1968 Dodge Charger 440 Magnum R/T through the streets of San Francisco, using the hills as jumps.

In a professional driver's touch (before compulsory restraints were introduced in California), Hickman's character buckles his seat belt before flooring it at the beginning of the pursuit by the Highland Green 1968 Ford Mustang 390 GT, driven by Steve McQueen.

The dangers were real: in one shot Hickman accidentally loses control and clips the camera fixed to a parked car. The chase climaxes with his Charger careering off into a gas station at which the fuel pumps erupt into a massive fireball.

== The French Connection ==
Hickman played federal agent Mulderig who is in constant conflict with Gene Hackman's Popeye Doyle in the 1971 Best Picture Oscar winner The French Connection. Mulderig is gunned down by Popeye at the climax of the film. Hickman also performed a high-risk car-chase scene for director William Friedkin in the film. Hickman, who was already hired as the stunt coordinator for the film, was a last minute acting replacement for Michael McGuire, who backed out of the film for unknown reasons.

As with Bullitt, The French Connection (also produced by Bullitt's producer, Philip D'Antoni) is famed for its car-chase sequence. What differs from the usual car chase is that Hackman's character is chasing an elevated train from the street below (the scene was filmed in Bensonhurst, Brooklyn, with most of the action taking place on 86th Street). This chase was performed in real traffic, as Hickman drove the brown 1971 Pontiac LeMans at speeds up to 90 mph with Friedkin manning the camera right behind him, and at one point Hickman hits a car driven by a local man on his way to work who wandered into the scene. This scene was kept in the film by Friedkin as it added reality to the whole sequence, however, the scene where the woman steps out into the street with a baby carriage was staged.

== The Seven-Ups ==
Hickman performed a chase sequence for the 1973 film The Seven-Ups (in which Hickman again worked with Philip D'Antoni, who had also produced Bullitt and The French Connection). In The Seven-Ups, Hickman drove the car being chased by the star of the film, Roy Scheider, who is doubled by Hickman's friend and fellow stuntman, Jerry Summers. The chase itself leans heavily on the Bullitt chase, with the two cars bouncing down the gradients of uptown New York (à la San Francisco's steep hills) with Hickman's large 1973 Pontiac Grand Ville four-door sedan pursued by Scheider's Pontiac Ventura.

In the accompanying behind-the-scenes featurette of the 2006 DVD, Hickman can be seen co-ordinating the chase from the street, where it can be seen how dangerous these sequences were: on cue, a stuntman in a parked car opens his door, only to have Hickman's vehicle take it completely off its hinges, where (from the behind-the-scenes footage) we see the door fly off at force, missing only by chance the close-quarter camera team set-up only yards away. The end of the chase was Bill's own idea, a 'homage' to the death of Jayne Mansfield, where one of the cars smashes into the back of an eighteen-wheel truck, peeling off its roof like a can of sardines.

== Other work ==
Hickman had many bit parts in classic television series of the 1950s and 1960s, such as Bat Masterson, The Man from UNCLE and Batman. In one year (1957), he had the rare distinction of being cast as the assailant who slices Frank Sinatra's vocal cords in The Joker Is Wild and whips Elvis Presley in Jailhouse Rock.

Hickman performed the stunt where James Bond driving a Mustang Mach 1 escapes a police hot pursuit in a Las Vegas parking lot by jumping over parked cars in Diamonds Are Forever (1971). Hickman was brought in to perform the stunt when the stunt driver hired for the gig failed to make the jump. The Ford Motor Co. had provided a limited number of Mustangs and the producers could not afford to lose another one, so they hired Hickman. He performed the stunt successfully on the first take.

He moved on to more stunt coordination work in films as the 1970s wound down, notably The Hindenburg and Capricorn One. He staged the motorcycle chase in Electra Glide In Blue, starring Robert Blake, and also appeared as a driver in the 1969 Disney film The Love Bug and as the military driver for George C. Scott in the Academy Award-winning movie Patton.

== Personal life ==
In 1963, Hickman and fellow stuntman Alex Sharp witnessed a bank robber, Carl Follette, speed by them on the Ventura Freeway near the Laurel Canyon off-ramp. After Hickman saw the suspect shoot police Officer Alphonso Begue in the chest, he used his stunt driver skills to chase him down on Laurel Canyon Road until law enforcement officers could catch up. The car chase eventually ended in a North Hollywood parking lot where Follette was shot and killed in an exchange of gunfire with the police.

== Death ==
Bill Hickman died of cancer in 1986 at the age of 65 in Indio, California.

== Credited acting roles ==
- Salute to the Marines (1943) - Marine (uncredited)
- See Here, Private Hargrove (1944) - (uncredited)
- The Beginning or the End (1947) - Barometric Observer blown off his feet by the Trinity (nuclear test) (uncredited)
- It Happened in Brooklyn (1947) - Passerby on Street (uncredited)
- Tulsa (1949) - Bill, the Caterpillar tractor driver at oilfield fire (uncredited)
- To Please a Lady (1950) - Mike's Pit Crew
- Meet Me After the Show (1951) - Court Bailiff (uncredited)
- Iron Man (1951) - Fight Crowd Spectator (uncredited)
- Angels in the Outfield (1951) - 1st Reporter (uncredited)
- The Unknown Man (1951) - Reporter in Courtroom (uncredited)
- Fixed Bayonets! (1951) - (uncredited)
- Because You're Mine (1952) - G.I. (uncredited)
- My Pal Gus (1952) - Courtroom Photographer (uncredited)
- Code Two (1953) - Motorcycle Officer (uncredited)
- Gentlemen Prefer Blondes (1953) - Ship Passenger (uncredited)
- Loophole (1954) - Bank Customer (uncredited)
- Lucky Me (1954) - Passerby on Street / Diner (uncredited)
- Woman's World (1954) - Restaurant Patron (uncredited)
- Phffft (1954) - Studio Technician (uncredited)
- A Bullet for Joey (1955) - Macklin's bodyguard / driver (uncredited)
- The Far Horizons (1955) - Member of the expedition (uncredited)
- Love Me or Leave Me (1955) - Nightclub Patron (uncredited)
- He Laughed Last (1956) - Bartender (uncredited)
- The Best Things in Life Are Free (1956) - Moviegoer at Premiere (uncredited)
- Ten Thousand Bedrooms (1957) - Party Guest (uncredited)
- Appointment with a Shadow (1957) - Farrell - Police Detective (uncredited)
- The Joker Is Wild (1957) - Hood with Knife (uncredited)
- The Helen Morgan Story (1957) - Party Guest (uncredited)
- Raintree County (1957) - Townsman (uncredited)
- Jailhouse Rock (1957) - Guard Who Whips Vince (uncredited)
- Kiss Them for Me (1957) - Party Guest (uncredited)
- Houseboat (1958) - Handsome Man (uncredited)
- The Mating Game (1959) - Fleeing Office Worker (uncredited)
- The Beat Generation (1959) - Man in Lineup (uncredited)
- Don't Give Up the Ship (1959) - Guardsman (uncredited)
- Home from the Hill (1960) - Bartender (uncredited)
- Bat Masterson (1960) - (two episodes) Topaz & Binns
- Mr. Hobbs Takes a Vacation (1962) - Driver in Bird Walk Scene (uncredited)
- Johnny Cool (1963) - Minor Role (uncredited)
- Take Her, She's Mine (1963) - Wolf-Whistler Who Drives Into Mailbox (uncredited)
- Point Blank (1967) - Reese's Guard on Balcony (uncredited)
- Bullitt (1968) - Phil
- The Love Bug (1968) - Driver #8
- Patton (1970) - Patton's Driver
- Zabriskie Point (1970) - Gun store owner / Clerk (uncredited)
- The French Connection (1971) - Bill Mulderig
- The War Between Men and Women (1972) - Large Gentleman
- Hickey & Boggs (1972) - Monte
- The Seven-Ups (1973) - Bo (final film role)
