= Kenneth Utt =

American film producer

- Born: July 13, 1921; Winston-Salem, North Carolina, U.S.
- Died: January 19, 1994 (aged 72); New York City, U.S.
- Education: Elon University
- Occupations: Producer; production manager
- Spouse: Angie Utt
- Children: 2

Kenneth Utt (July 13, 1921 – January 19, 1994), was an American film producer and unit production manager. He received the Academy Award for Best Picture for producing The Silence of the Lambs (1991).

== Life and career ==
Utt was born in Winston-Salem, North Carolina, on July 13, 1921. He graduated from Elon College (now Elon University) in Elon, N.C. in 1942. He received a scholarship to Juilliard School where he studied vocals in hopes of becoming an opera singer. Utt served in the Army Air Forces during World War II. He returned home and became a stage and radio actor, appearing in shows like Carousel.

Utt began working in production on stage performances of Peter Pan, the lesser known 1950 Broadway version with music by Leonard Bernstein. He then became a film line producer for films like Midnight Cowboy (1969), The French Connection (1971), The Seven-Ups (1973) and All That Jazz (1979). Utt was a producer and unit production manager on four Jonathan Demme films: Something Wild (1986), Married to the Mob (1988), The Silence of the Lambs (1991) and Philadelphia (1993), with Lambs and Philadelphia earning awards at the Oscars. Utt was among the three producers who received Best Picture for Lambs, in which he also made a cameo appearance.

== Death ==
Utt died on January 19, 1994, at Mount Sinai Hospital in Manhattan at the age of 72. The cause was bone cancer. He is survived by his wife Angie, son Tim Utt, and daughter Robin Utt Fajardo.

== Filmography ==
He was a producer in all films unless otherwise noted.

=== Film ===
Year	Film	Credit	Award	Notes
1968	The Subject Was Roses	Associate producer		
1969	Midnight Cowboy	Associate producer		
1970	The Boys in the Band	Associate producer		
1970	The People Next Door	Associate producer		
1971	The French Connection	Associate producer		
1973	Godspell	Associate producer		
1973	The Seven-Ups	Executive producer		
1979	All That Jazz	Associate producer		
1981	Eyewitness	Associate producer		
1982	Still of the Night	Associate producer		
1983	Star 80			
1985	Heaven Help Us	Associate producer		
1986	Power	Associate producer		
1986	Something Wild			
1988	Married to the Mob			
1990	Miami Blues	Co-producer		
1991	The Silence of the Lambs		Academy Award for Best Picture	
1993	Philadelphia	Executive producer		Final film as a producer

Production manager

Year	Film	Role
1968	Bye Bye Braverman	Production supervisor
1978	The Wiz	Production manager
1979	All That Jazz	Production manager
1981	Eyewitness	Unit production manager
1982	Still of the Night	Production manager
1983	Star 80	Production manager
1985	Heaven Help Us	Production manager
1986	Power	Production manager
1986	Something Wild	Production manager
1988	Married to the Mob	Unit production manager
1990	Miami Blues	Unit production manager
1991	The Silence of the Lambs	Unit production manager
1992	Gladiator	Unit production manager
1993	Philadelphia	Unit production manager

As an actor

Year	Film	Role	Notes
1944	Winged Victory	Chorus Member	Uncredited
1986	Something Wild	Dad	
1988	Married to the Mob	Sourpuss F.B.I. Man	
1990	Miami Blues	Krishna Ramba, Head Krishna	
1991	The Silence of the Lambs	Dr. Akin	
1991	Dogfight	Thrift Shop Man	
1993	Philadelphia	The Jury	
1994	The Ref	Jeremiah Willard	
2002	The Truth About Charlie	The Late Monsieur Hyppolite	
2004	The Manchurian Candidate	Rosie's Cousin's Mentor	

Miscellaneous crew

Year	Film	Role
1970	The Angel Levine	Production executive

Location management

Year	Film	Role
1972	Fuzz	Location supervisor: Boston

Thanks

Year	Film	Role
1998	Beloved	Grateful acknowledgment

=== Television ===
Year	Title	Credit	Notes
1962−65	The Defenders	Associate producer	
1966	Hawk	Associate producer	
1967	N.Y.P.D.	Associate producer	
1967	Coronet Blue	Associate producer	
1973	The Connection	Associate producer	Television film
1973	Mr. Inside/Mr. Outside	Associate producer	Television pilot
1975−76	Movin' On	Associate producer	
1982	Baker's Dozen		
1986	Intimate Strangers		Television film

Production manager

Year	Title	Role	Notes
1961−62	The Defenders	Production manager	
1972	Liza with a Z	Production supervisor	Television special
1974−75	Movin' On	In charge of production	
1975	Strike Force	Executive in charge of production	Television film

As an actor

Year	Title	Role
1954−56	Studio One	Dave Horn Joseph Blake

Miscellaneous crew

Year	Title	Role
1962	The Defenders	Assistant to the producer
1962	The Nurses	Assistant to the producer

Thanks

Year	Title	Role	Notes
1997	Subway Stories	Dedicated to Kenny Utt	Television film
