= Bullitt =

1968 film by Peter Yates

- Theatrical release poster
- Directed by: Peter Yates
- Screenplay by: Alan R. Trustman; Harry Kleiner
- Based on: Mute Witness (1963 novel) by Robert L. Fish
- Produced by: Philip D'Antoni
- Starring: Steve McQueen; Robert Vaughn; Jacqueline Bisset; Don Gordon; Robert Duvall; Simon Oakland; Norman Fell
- Cinematography: William A. Fraker
- Edited by: Frank P. Keller
- Music by: Lalo Schifrin
- Production company: Solar Productions
- Distributed by: Warner Bros.-Seven Arts
- Release date: October 17, 1968
- Running time: 113 minutes
- Country: United States
- Language: English
- Budget: $4 million
- Box office: $42.3 million

Bullitt is a 1968 American crime action thriller film directed by Peter Yates, from a screenplay by Alan R. Trustman and Harry Kleiner, based on the 1963 novel Mute Witness by Robert L. Fish. It stars Steve McQueen, Robert Vaughn, Jacqueline Bisset, Don Gordon, Robert Duvall, Simon Oakland, and Norman Fell. In the film, San Francisco police detective Frank Bullitt (McQueen) investigates the murder of a witness he was assigned to protect.

A star vehicle for McQueen, Bullitt began development once Yates was hired upon the completion of the screenplay, which differs significantly from Fish's novel. Principal photography took place throughout 1967, with filming primarily taking place on location in San Francisco. The film was produced by McQueen's Solar Productions, with Robert Relyea as executive producer alongside Philip D'Antoni. Lalo Schifrin wrote the film's jazz-inspired score. Bullitt is notable for its extensive use of practical locations and stunt work.

Bullitt was released in the United States on October 17, 1968, by Warner Bros.-Seven Arts. It was a critical success, with praise for its screenplay, editing, music and action sequences; its car chase sequence is regarded as one of the most influential in film history, and retrospective reception has named Bullitt among the greatest action films ever made. The film received numerous awards and nominations, including being nominated for two Academy Awards, winning for Best Film Editing. It grossed $42.3 million worldwide, becoming one of the highest-grossing films of 1968. In 2007, Bullitt was selected for preservation in the U.S. National Film Registry by the Library of Congress.

== Plot ==
On a Friday night in Chicago mobster Johnny Ross flees the Outfit. The next morning SFPD detective Lieutenant Frank Bullitt and his team, Delgetti and Stanton are tasked by politically-ambitious Walter Chalmers with guarding Ross over the weekend, until he can be presented as a witness to a Senate subcommittee hearing on organized crime on Monday morning. The detectives are told he is in a cheap hotel on Embarcadero. Delgetti will take the first shift, then Stanton and then Bullitt. At 1am Sunday, while Stanton is phoning Bullitt to say Chalmers and a friend want to come up, Ross unchains the room door. Two hitmen burst in shooting Stanton in the leg and Ross in the neck.

Chalmers holds Bullitt responsible for the injuries to Ross. After Bullitt thwarts a second assassination attempt at the hospital, Ross dies from his wounds. Bullitt sends the body to the morgue as a John Doe to keep the investigation open. An informant says that Ross was in town because he stole millions of dollars from the mob. Bullitt also finds out he made a long distance phone call to a hotel in San Mateo.

While driving his Ford Mustang, Bullitt becomes aware he is being followed by a Dodge Charger driven by the two hitmen. An extended chase ensues through the streets of San Francisco to Brisbane where the Dodge crashes off the road, killing its occupants in a fiery explosion.

Bullitt and Delgetti are confronted by their boss, Captain Sam Bennett, and Chalmers (who is being assisted by SFPD Captain Baker). After being served a writ of habeas corpus, Bullitt reveals that Ross has died. Bennett ignores the writ because it's the weekend and lets Bullitt investigate the long distance phone call to San Mateo. With no car, Bullitt gets a ride from his girlfriend Cathy. At the hotel, Bullitt finds the woman who was phoned garrotted in her room. But Cathy follows him and is left horrified by the scene. On the way back to San Francisco she confronts Bullitt about his work saying "Frank, you live in a sewer" and wonders "What will happen to us?"

While examining the victim's luggage, Bullitt and Delgetti discover a travel brochure for Rome and traveler's checks made out to an Albert and Dorothy Renick. Bullitt requests their passport applications from Chicago. Bullitt, Captain Bennett, Chalmers and Captain Baker gather around the telecopier as the applications arrive. It turns out Chalmers sent Bullitt to guard an Albert Renick, a used car salesman from Chicago, while his wife Dorothy was staying in San Mateo. Bullitt realizes that Ross was playing Chalmers by using Renick as a body double to escape the country Sunday night.

At San Francisco International Airport, Delgetti and Bullitt watch the Rome gate. However, Ross (now using Renick's passport) has switched to an earlier London flight. Bullitt boards the plane after it is ordered to return to the terminal but the mobster escapes through the rear cabin door. In the crowded passenger terminal, Ross kills a deputy sheriff before being shot dead by Bullitt. Chalmers arrives but leaves after saying nothing.

Early Monday morning, Bullitt comes home to find Cathy asleep in his bed having chosen to stay.

== Cast ==
Credits from the American Film Institute.

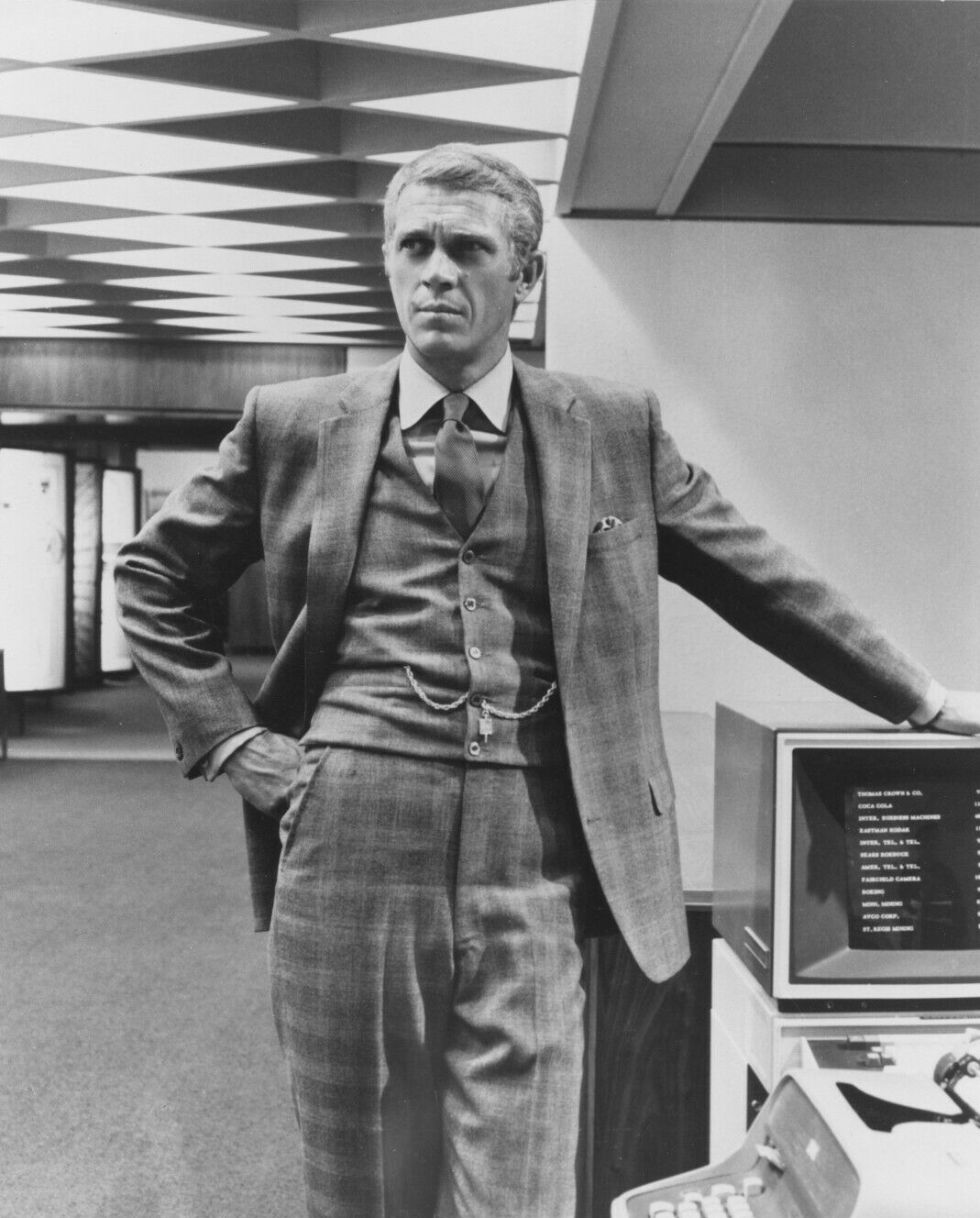
McQueen in 1968, the year of the film's release.

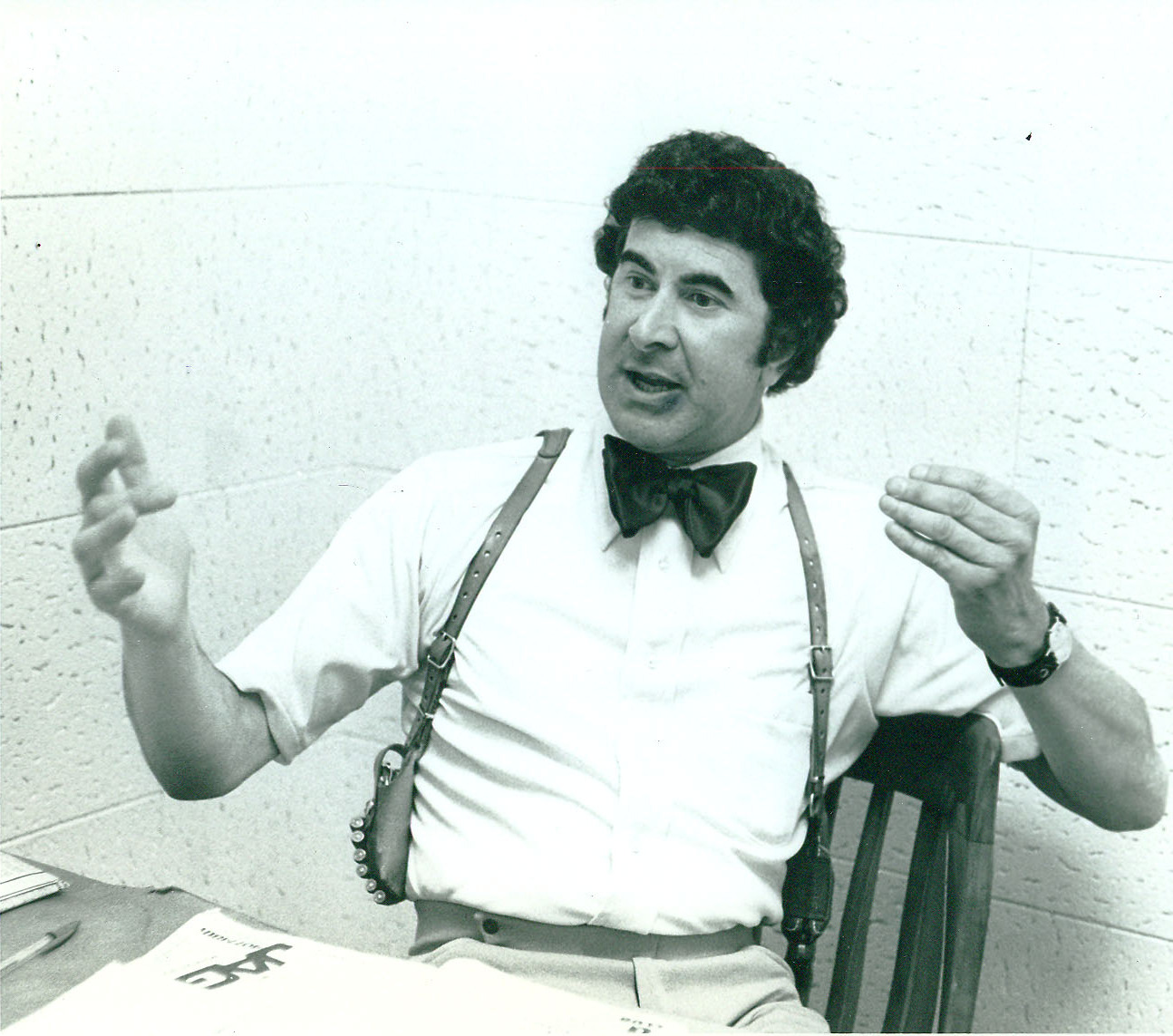
Dave Toschi is the real-life San Francisco police officer who influenced Bullitt's characterization.

- Steve McQueen as SFPD Lieutenant Frank Bullitt
- Robert Vaughn as Walter Chalmers
- Jacqueline Bisset as Cathy, Bullitt's girlfriend.
- Don Gordon as Inspector "Del" Delgetti, Bullitt's partner.
- Robert Duvall as Weissberg, a cab driver
- Simon Oakland as Captain Sam Bennett
- Norman Fell as Captain Baker
- Georg Stanford Brown as Dr. Willard
- Justin Tarr as Eddy, an informant
- Carl Reindel as Sergeant Carl Stanton
- Felice Orlandi as Albert Renick, the fake "Johnny Ross"
- Pat Renella as the real Johnny Ross
- Vic Tayback as Pete Ross
- Robert Lipton as Chalmers' aide
- Ed Peck as Wescott, a reporter
- Paul Genge as Mike
- Bill Hickman as Phil
- John Aprea as Killer
- Al Checco as hotel desk clerk

Uncredited

- Brandy Carroll as Dorothy Renick
- Marjorie Eaton as Mrs. Larkin
- Joanna Cassidy as a party guest

== Production ==
Bullitt was co-produced by McQueen's Solar Productions and Warner Bros.-Seven Arts. The film was pitched to Jack L. Warner as "doing authority differently".

=== Development ===
Bullitt was director Peter Yates' first American film. He was hired after McQueen saw his 1967 U.K. feature, Robbery, with its extended car chase. Joseph E. Levine, whose Embassy Pictures had distributed Robbery, did not like the film much, but Alan Trustman, who saw the picture the week he was writing the Bullitt chase scenes, insisted that McQueen, Relyea, and D'Antoni (none of whom had ever heard of Yates) see Robbery and consider Yates as director for Bullitt.

=== Casting ===
In the original novel Mute Witness, the lead character is an older, overweight police lieutenant named Clancy. D'Antoni and his original co-producer Ernest Pintoff considered the film a vehicle for Spencer Tracy, but his death in 1967 ended that. McQueen was a great admirer of Tracy and took on the project, in part, as a tribute to him. The original novel was also set in New York City, not San Francisco.

McQueen based his performance on San Francisco Inspector Dave Toschi, later known as an inspector of the Zodiac Killer case, with whom he worked prior to filming. McQueen even copied Toschi's unique "fast-draw" shoulder holster.

Robert Vaughn initially refused the role of Chalmers, feeling the plot was too "thin". Decades later, when Vaughn considered entering politics, he discovered that people could not take him seriously, or found him untrustworthy, as they remembered his performance in this film.

Katharine Ross was offered the role of Cathy, but she refused it, as she felt the part was too small.

This film was the first of three times McQueen worked on-screen with his real-life friend Don Gordon, the other two were in Papillon (1973) and The Towering Inferno (1974).

=== Filming ===
Bullitt is notable for its extensive use of external locations rather than studio sets, and its attention to procedural detail, from police evidence processing to emergency-room procedures. Director Yates' use of the new lightweight Arriflex cameras allowed for greater flexibility in location shooting. The film was shot almost entirely on location in San Francisco. In the emergency-room operation scene, real doctors and nurses were used as the supporting cast. According to McQueen, "The thing we tried to achieve was not to do a theatrical film, but a film about reality."

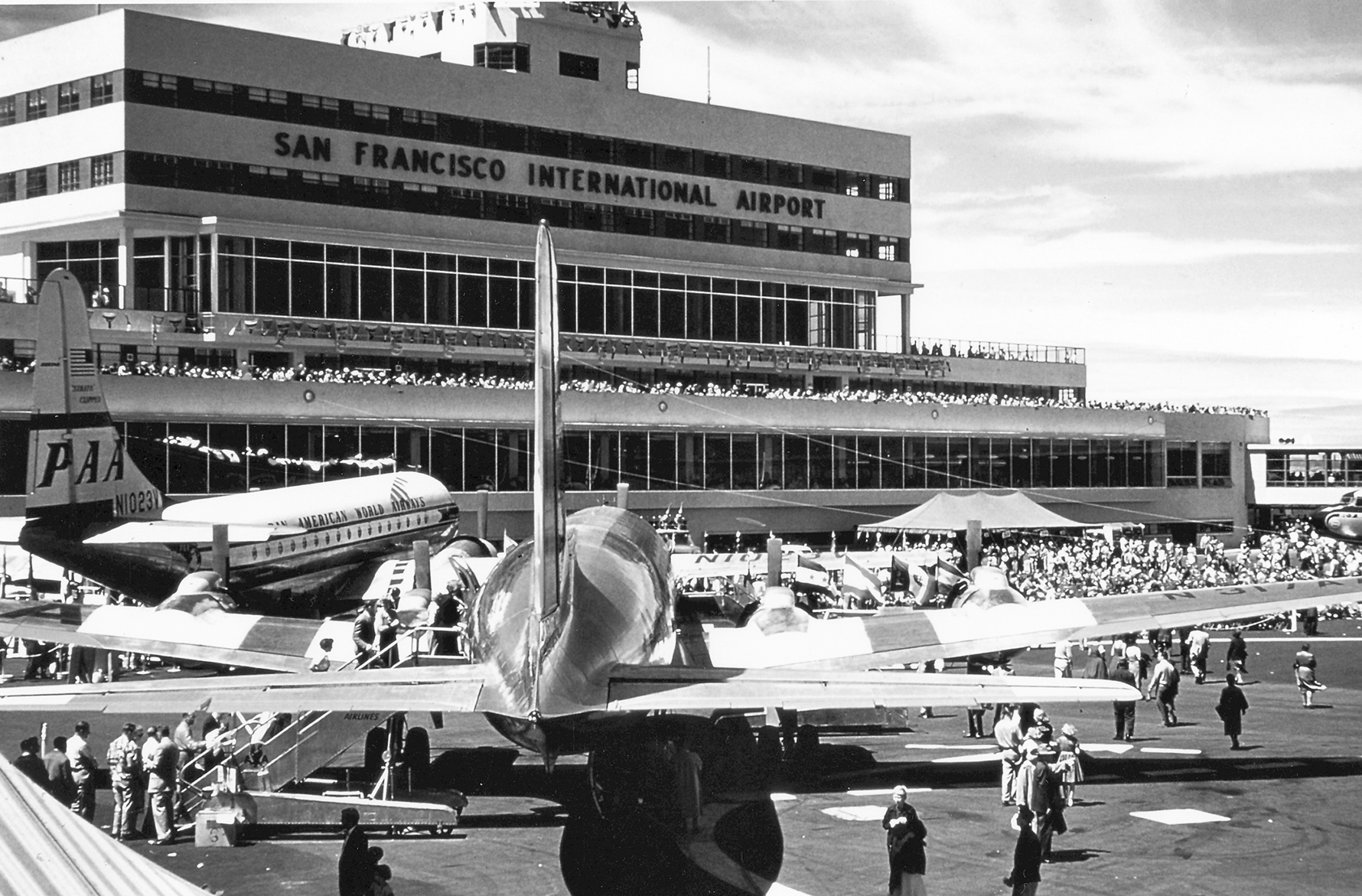
San Francisco International Airport Central Passenger Terminal on August 27, 1954. Mayor Joseph Alioto helped the production obtain permission to film at the airport, over two weeks of night shoots.

Bullitt was one of the first feature films to be shot almost entirely on location in San Francisco. With the exception of the opening set piece in Chicago, the entire film was shot there. In a 1968 interview, D'Anatoni reasoned the production would cost no more to shoot in San Francisco than in Los Angeles, despite transportation and housing expenses, because so much money was saved on construction by using real locations.

Filming locations included:

- Mark Hopkins Hotel
- Kennedy Hotel (226 Embarcadero near Howard Street, close to the Embarcadero Freeway)
- Nob Hill
- Cow Hollow
- Chalmers' Residence, 2700 Vallejo Street, Pacific Heights
- Grace Cathedral
- Enrico's (Broadway at Kearny Street)
- San Francisco International Airport

== Car chase ==
Bullitt performing a reverse burnout in the car chase scene

At the time of the film's release, the car chase scenes featuring McQueen at the wheel in all driver-visual scenes generated prodigious excitement. The chase scene has also been cited by critics as groundbreaking in its realism and originality. Leonard Maltin has called it a "now-classic car chase, one of the screen's all-time best." Emanuel Levy wrote in 2003, "Bullitt contains one of the most exciting car chases in film history, a sequence that revolutionized Hollywood's standards." In his obituary for Peter Yates, Bruce Weber wrote, "Mr. Yates' reputation probably rests most securely on Bullitt (1968), his first American film – and indeed, on one particular scene, an extended car chase that instantly became a classic."

=== Vehicles ===
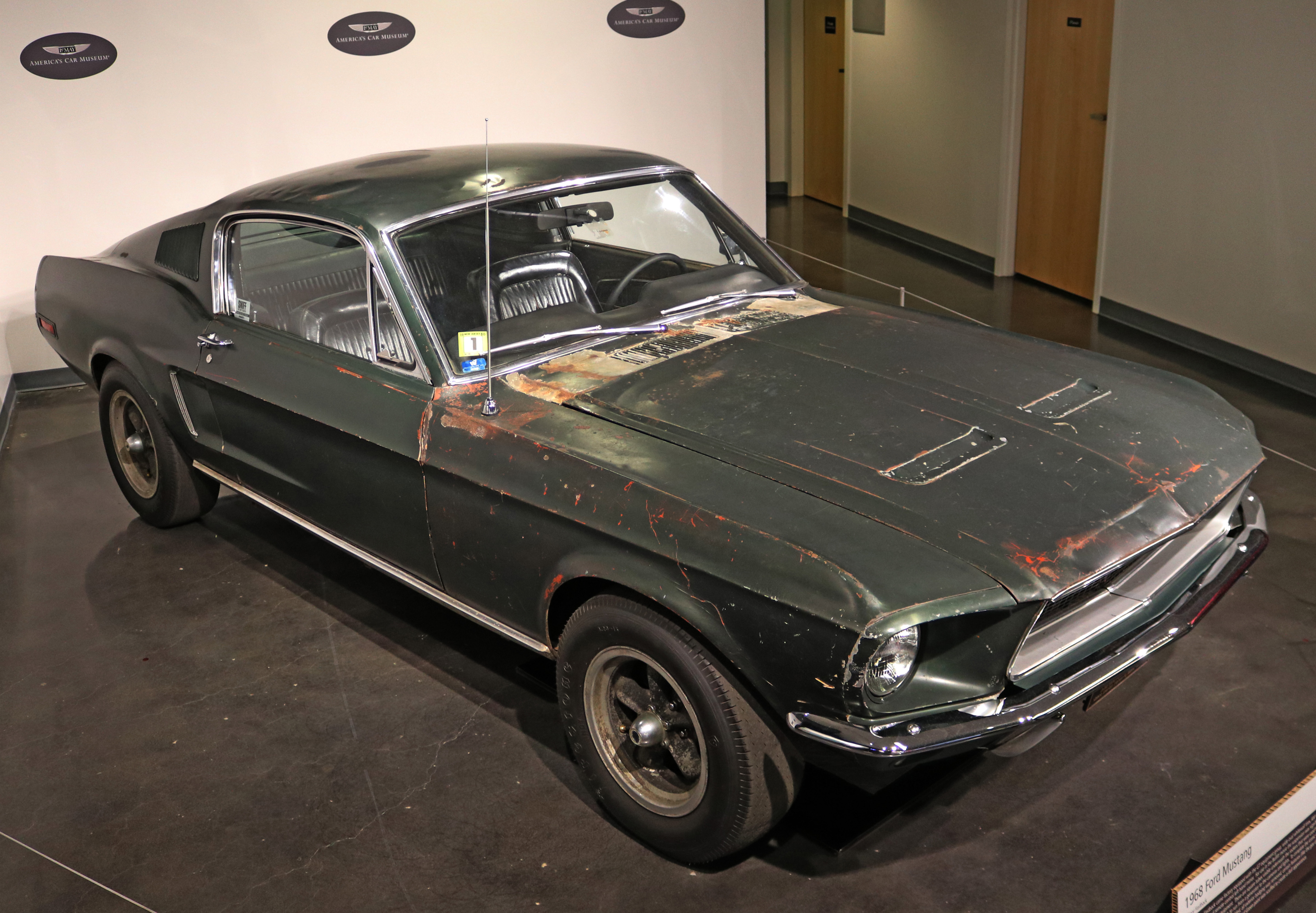
Bullitt Mustang '559 on display at the LeMay Car Museum in Tacoma, Washington, 2019

Warner Bros. ordered two identical 1968 Ford Mustangs for filming. Both were painted Highland Green and had the GT package with 390 FE V8 engines. These cars had the sequential vehicle identification numbers 8R02S125558 and 8R02S125559. Prior to filming, the cars were modified by vehicle supervisor Max Balchowsky. Car '558 was modified and used for the stunt driving, while '559 was used for McQueen's close-up driving shots.

After the filming was complete, '559 was repaired and repainted with a single coat of Highland Green, and sold to Warner Bros. employee Robert Ross. Ross drove it until 1970, then sold it to Frank Marranca, who had it shipped from California to New Jersey. In 1974, Marranca sold the car to Robert Kiernan through an advertisement in Road & Track. In 1977, Steve McQueen attempted to buy it back, but was refused. The Kiernans drove it for 46,000 miles as their family car, then put it in storage in 1980. Kiernan's son, Sean, began to restore the vehicle in 2014, and had it authenticated in 2016, with documentation that included McQueen's letter offering to purchase it. On January 10, 2020, the car was sold by Mecum Auctions for $3.7 million (about $4.53 million in 2025) to an unidentified buyer.

Car '558 had been damaged severely during filming and was subsequently sent to a scrapyard. In the ensuing decades, the car was assumed to be lost. In 2016, though, Hugo Sanchez purchased a pair of Mustang coupes from the backyard of a house near Los Cabos, Mexico. He then sent the cars to Ralph Garcia to start work on turning one into a clone of the "Eleanor" Mustang from the film Gone in 60 Seconds. Realizing one of the two Mustangs was an S-code, Garcia had the car authenticated by Kevin Marti. The authentication revealed this to be the lost Bullitt car. In 2017, Sanchez and Garcia began to give the car a full restoration.

Stunt driver Bill Hickman provided two 1968 440 Magnum V8 Dodge Chargers, which were painted black for use in the film. One was reserved for close-ups, and the other performed the stunts. Max Balchowsky strengthened the suspension of the stunt car, but left the engines mostly unmodified.

=== Filming ===
The chase scene starts at the 1:05:00 mark, and lasts approximately 10 minutes. It begins under Highway 101 in the city's Mission District as Bullitt spots the hitmen's car. It ends outside the city, at the Brisbane exit of the Guadalupe Canyon Parkway on San Bruno Mountain. Shooting occurred over a period of weeks. The chase sequence combined several locations, located miles apart and edited together. Mapping the movie route shows that it is not continuous and is impossible to follow in real time.

Two 1968 325-horsepower 390 FE V8 Ford Mustang GT Fastbacks with four-speed manual transmissions in Highland Green were purchased by Warner Bros. for the film. The Mustangs' engines, brakes, and suspensions were heavily modified for the chase by veteran car racer and technician Max Balchowsky. Ford Motor Company originally lent two Galaxie sedans for the chase scenes, but the producers found the cars too heavy for the jumps over the hills of San Francisco. They also felt a Ford-on-Ford battle would not be believable on screen. The cars were replaced with 1968 375-horsepower 440 Magnum V8 Dodge Chargers painted in black. The engines in the Chargers were left largely unmodified, but the suspensions were mildly upgraded to cope with the demands of the stunt work.

The director called for maximum speeds of about 130 km/h (81 mph), but the cars (including the chase cars) at times reached speeds over 170 km/h (110 mph).

Drivers' point-of-view shots were used to give the audience a participant's feel of the chase. Filming took three weeks, resulting in 9 minutes 42 seconds of pursuit. Multiple takes were spliced into a single end product, resulting in discontinuity: heavy damage on the passenger side of Bullitt's car can be seen much earlier than the incident producing it, and the Charger appears to lose five wheel covers, with different ones missing in different shots. Shooting simultaneously from multiple angles and creating a montage from the footage took place to give the illusion of different streets also resulted in the speeding cars passing the same vehicles at multiple times, including, most notably, a green Volkswagen Beetle.

In one early scene, the Charger crashes into the camera and the damaged front fender noticeable in later scenes. Local authorities did not allow the car chase to be filmed on the Golden Gate Bridge, but did permit filming in Midtown locations, including Bernal Heights, the Mission District, and on the outskirts of neighboring Brisbane.

McQueen, a racecar driver at the time, drove in the close-up scenes, while stunt coordinator Carey Loftin, stuntman and motorcycle racer Bud Ekins, and McQueen's usual stunt driver, Loren Janes, drove for the high-speed parts of the chase and performed other dangerous stunts. Ekins, who doubled for McQueen in The Great Escape sequence in which McQueen's character jumps a motorcycle over a barbed-wire fence, performs a lowsider crash stunt in front of a skidding truck during the Bullitt chase. The position of Mustang's interior rearview mirror changes depending on who is driving: When the mirror is up, McQueen is visible behind the wheel; when it is down, a stunt man is driving.

The black Dodge Charger was driven by veteran stunt driver Bill Hickman, who played one of the hitmen and helped with the chase-scene choreography. The other hitman was played by Paul Genge, who played a character who had driven a Dodge off the road to his death in an episode of Perry Mason ("The Case of the Sausalito Sunrise") two years earlier. In an article of the March 1987 issue of Muscle Car Review magazine, one of the drivers involved in the chase sequence remarked that the Charger, with the larger Dodge 440 CID Magnum engine versus the Ford 390 CID FE engine and greater horsepower (375 versus 325), was so much faster than the Mustang that the drivers had to keep backing off the accelerator to prevent the Charger from pulling away from the Mustang.

=== Editing ===
The editing of the car chase likely won Frank P. Keller the editing Oscar for 1968, and has been included in lists of the "Best Editing Sequences of All-Time." In the volume The Sixties: 1960–1969 (2003), of his book series History of the American Cinema, Cinema Arts professor Paul Monaco wrote:

The most compelling street footage of 1968, however, appeared in an entirely contrived sequence, with nary a hint of documentary feel about it – the car chase through the streets of San Francisco in Bullitt, created from footage shot over nearly five weeks.

William A. Fraker, the cinematographer for the film, attributed the success of the chase sequence primarily to the work of Keller. At the time, Keller was credited with cutting the piece in such a superb manner that he made the city of San Francisco a "character" in the film.

The editing of the scene was not without difficulties. Ralph Rosenblum wrote in 1979, "Those who care about such things may know that during the filming of the climactic chase scene in Bullitt, an out-of-control car filled with dummies tripped a wire, which prematurely sent a costly set up in flames, and that editor Frank Keller salvaged the near-catastrophe with a clever and unusual juxtaposition of images that made the explosion appear to go off on time."

== Music ==
The original score was composed by Lalo Schifrin to track the various moods and the action of the film, with Schifrin's signature contemporary American jazz style. The tracks on the soundtrack album are alternate versions of those heard in the film, re-recorded by Schifrin with leading jazz musicians, including Bud Shank (flute), Carol Kaye (electric bass), Ray Brown (bass), Howard Roberts (guitar), and Larry Bunker (drums).

In 2000, the original arrangements, as heard in the film, were recreated by Schifrin in a recording session with the WDR Big Band in Cologne, Germany, and released on the Aleph label. The release also includes re-recordings of the 1968 soundtrack album arrangements for some tracks.

In 2009, the never-before-released original recording of the score heard in the film, recorded by Schifrin on the Warner Bros. scoring stage with engineer Dan Wallin, was made available by Film Score Monthly. Some score passages and cues are virtually identical to the official soundtrack album, although many softer, moodier cues from the film were not chosen or had been rewritten for the soundtrack release. Also included are additional cues not used in the film. In addition, the two-CD set features the official soundtrack album, newly mixed from the 1-inch master tape.

In the restaurant scene with McQueen and Bissett, the live band playing in the background is Meridian West, a jazz quartet whom McQueen had seen performing at The Trident, a famous restaurant in Sausalito.

== Release ==
The film opened at Radio City Music Hall in New York City on Thursday, October 17, 1968, together with a new stage show.

== Reception ==
=== Box office ===
Bullitt garnered both critical acclaim and box-office success. It grossed $210,000 in its first week, including a Hall-record Saturday of $49,073. Produced on a $5.5 million budget, the film grossed $19 million in 1968, making it the fourth-highest-grossing film that year, and over $42.3 million in the U.S. through 2021.

=== Critical response ===
Bullitt was well received by critics, and is considered by some to be one of the best films of 1968. At the time, Renata Adler made the film a The New York Times Critics' Pick, calling it a "terrific movie, just right for Steve McQueen: Fast, well acted, written the way people talk". According to Adler, "The ending should satisfy fans from Dragnet to Camus."

In 2004, The New York Times placed the film on its list of the "Best 1,000 Movies Ever Made". In 2011, Time listed it among the "15 Greatest Movie Car Chases of All Time", describing it as "the one, the first, the granddaddy, the chase on the top of almost every list", and saying, "Bullitt's car chase is a reminder that every great such scene is a triumph of editing as much as it is stunt work". Quentin Tarantino called it "one of the best directed movies ever made."

It won 1968's Academy Award for Best Editing. Among 21st-century critics, it holds a 98% approval rating on Rotten Tomatoes, representing positive reviews from 45 of 46 critics, with an average rating of 7.90/10. The website's critical consensus reads: "Steve McQueen is cool as ice in this thrilling police procedural that also happens to contain the arguably greatest car chase ever." On Metacritic, the film has a score of 81 out of 100 based on reviews from 20 critics, indicating "universal acclaim".

In 2025, The Hollywood Reporter listed Bullitt as having the best stunts of 1968.

=== Awards and nominations ===
The film has won several critical awards. Frank P. Keller won the 1969 Academy Award for Best Film Editing, and it was also nominated for Best Sound. Five nominations at the BAFTA Film Awards for 1969 included Best Director for Peter Yates, Best Supporting Actor for Robert Vaughn, Best Cinematography for William A. Fraker, Best Film Editing for Frank P. Keller, and Best Sound Track. Robert L. Fish, Harry Kleiner and Alan Trustman won the 1969 Edgar Award for Best Motion Picture. Keller won the American Cinema Editors Eddie Award for Best Edited Feature Film. The film also received the National Society of Film Critics Award for Best Cinematography (William A. Fraker) and the Golden Reel Award for Best Sound Editing – Feature Film. At the 1970 Laurel Awards, the film received Golden Laurel nominations for Best Action Drama, Best Action Performance (Steve McQueen) and Best Female New Face (Jacqueline Bisset). In 2000, the Society of Camera Operators awarded Bullitt its "Historical Shot" award to David M. Walsh.

== Legacy ==
The famous car chase was later referenced in, among others, Peter Bogdanovich's screwball comedy film, What's Up, Doc?, the Clint Eastwood film, The Dead Pool, in the Futurama episode, "Bendin' in the Wind", and in the Archer episode, "The Kanes". The car chase can be seen playing on the screen in the drive-in theater scene in the 2014 film, Need for Speed. The 13th episode of the TV series Alcatraz includes a recreation of the chase scene, with newer models of the Mustang and Charger. Bullitt producer Philip D'Antoni went on to film two more car chases, The French Connection and The Seven-Ups, both set and shot in New York City. "The Bullitt Mustang" was a season-six episode of Blue Bloods, in which the car was central to a plot involving its theft.

The Ford Mustang name has been closely associated with the film. In 2001, the Ford Motor Company released the Bullitt edition Ford Mustang GT. Another version of the Ford Mustang Bullitt, which is closer to resembling the original film Mustang, was released in 2008 to commemorate the 40th anniversary of the film. A third version was released in 2018 for the 2019 and 2020 model years. In 2009, Bud Brutsman of Overhaulin' built an authentic-looking replica of the Bullitt Mustang, fully loaded with modern components, for the five-episode 2009 TV series, Celebrity Rides: Hollywood's Speeding Bullitt, hosted by Chad McQueen, son of Steve McQueen.

The Mustang is featured in the 2003 video game Ford Racing 2, in a drafting challenge, on a course named Port Side. It appears in the Movie Stars category, along with other famous cars such as the Ford Torino from Starsky & Hutch and the Ford Mustang Mach 1 from Diamonds Are Forever. In the 2011 video game, Driver: San Francisco, the "Bite the Bullet" mission is based on the famous chase scene, with licensed versions of the Mustang and Charger from the film. In the 2021 video game Forza Horizon 5, the film is referenced (but not directly named) by characters discussing an extremely similar Mustang after it is found abandoned in a barn, and again once it is restored.

Steve McQueen's likeness as Frank Bullitt was used in two Ford commercials. The first was for the Europe-only 1997 Ford Puma, which featured a special-effects montage of McQueen (who died in 1980) driving a new Puma around San Francisco before parking it in a studio apartment garage beside the film Mustang and the motorcycle from The Great Escape.

In a 2004 commercial for the 2005 Mustang, special effects were again used to create the illusion of McQueen driving the new Mustang, after a man receives a Field of Dreams-style epiphany and constructs a racetrack in the middle of a cornfield.

Several items of clothing worn by McQueen's Bullitt received a boost in popularity due to the film - desert boots, a trench coat, a blue turtleneck sweater, and most famously, a brown tweed jacket with elbow patches.

== Potential remake ==
In February 2022, Steven Spielberg was announced to be directing and producing a new film centered on the Frank Bullitt character for Warner Bros. Pictures, with Josh Singer writing the screenplay. The film was to be an original story, not a remake of the original film. Chad McQueen and niece Molly McQueen (son and granddaughter of Steve's) were to be executive producers (Chad died in 2024). In November 2022, Bradley Cooper was cast as Frank Bullitt.

== See also ==
- List of American films of 1968
