= The Connection (1973 film) =

- Written by: Albert Ruben
- Directed by: Tom Gries
- Starring: Charles Durning
- Theme music composer: John Murtaugh
- Country of origin: United States
- Original language: English

Production
- Executive producer: Philip D'Antoni
- Producers: Jacqueline Babbin; Kenneth Utt
- Cinematography: Richard C. Kratina
- Editor: Norman Gay
- Running time: 73 minutes
- Production companies: D'Antoni Productions; Metromedia Productions

Original release
- Network: ABC
- Release: February 27, 1973

The Connection is an ABC Movie of the Week that was broadcast on February 27, 1973, starring Charles Durning as an out-of-work newspaper reporter who becomes involved with jewel thieves. The film was produced by Philip D'Antoni as a pilot for a potential television series starring Durning.

== Plot ==
Frank Devlin is a popular newspaper columnist who is now out of work and in debt, and his friend and accountant Everett Hutchneker is trying to work through the mess of his finances. A young man he knows through his regular poker game, Sy McGruder, approaches him through his wife, June. Sy and others had robbed jewels from a Manhattan hotel safe, and now wants to sell them to the insurance company. Sy wants Devlin to serve as intermediary with the insurance company for a share of the proceeds.

After initial reluctance, Devlin agrees. He meets with representatives of the insurance company, and they meet with Sy. Devlin surreptitiously tapes that meeting. Sy's accomplices become aware of his involvement, and he seeks to fend them off as well as the unwelcome attention of Phelan, a police detective who dislikes him.

Because of his surreptitious taping, Devlin learns that Sy is deceiving him about the amount of money the insurance company agrees to pay for the jewels. Devlin learns that the jewels are to be exchanged for the money at Grant's Tomb, with Devlin to be cheated of his share. He goes to the location, confronts Sy and June, and the movie ends with a high-speed chase through the West Side of Manhattan that ends in the money being returned to the insurance company.

== Cast ==
- Charles Durning as Frank Devlin
- Ronny Cox as Everett Hutchneker
- Zohra Lampert as Hannah
- Dennis Cole as Sy McGruder
- Heather MacRae as June McGruder
- Howard Cosell as Himself
- Mike Kellin as Pillo
- Dana Wynter as Eleanor Warren
- Richard Bright as BeeJay
- Joe Keyes Jr. as Dewey
- Tom Rosqui as Detective Phelan
- Christopher Allport as Richard Wilcox
- Norman Bush as Gilson
- Franklin Cover as Lee Harris
- Dan Frazer as Verplanck
- Frank Gio as Kloss
- Merwin Goldsmith as Summons Server
- Burt Young as Ernie

== Reception ==
New York Times reviewer John J. O'Connor wrote that the plot "had holes wide enough to need a car chase or two" but praised the directing by Tom Gries and the performance by Charles Durning, whose character he described as resembling Jimmy Breslin. New York Daily News television critic Kay Gardella observed that the film's executive producer was Philip D'Antoni, who had produced The French Connection, and that like that film it featured a "high tension car chase." She called The Connection a "very realistic, engrossing tale," praised Durning and Gries, and said that it would have potential as a television series.

Los Angeles Times reviewer Don Page called The Connection a "90-minute exercise in character delineation," well-played by a largely Broadway cast. Durning, he wrote, "builds his performance until you are almost mesmerized with the totality of his portrait."
