= Shark Kill =

- DVD cover
- Genre: Adventure
- Written by: Sandor Stern
- Directed by: William A. Graham
- Starring: Richard Yniguez; Phillip Clark; Jennifer Warren
- Music by: George Romanis
- Country of origin: United States
- Original language: English

Production
- Executive producers: Philip D'Antoni; Barry J. Weitz
- Production location: Santa Barbara, California
- Cinematography: Terry K. Meade
- Editor: Art Seid
- Camera setup: Panaflex Camera and Lenses by Panavision
- Running time: 76 minutes
- Production company: D'Antoni/Weitz Productions

Original release
- Network: NBC
- Release: May 20, 1976

Shark Kill is a 1976 made-for-television adventure film directed by William A. Graham. The film was one of the first films released to capitalize on the success of the 1975 film Jaws; both films follow the premise of men hunting a bloodthirsty great white shark.

== Cast ==
- Richard Yniguez as Cabo Mendoza
- Phillip Clark as Rick Dayner
- Jennifer Warren as Carolyn
- Elizabeth Gill as Bonnie
- Victor Campos as Luis
- David Huddleston as Bearde

== Release ==
The film was first broadcast on NBC on May 20, 1976, and was released on DVD on January 17, 2007.

== See also ==
- List of killer shark films
