= The Seven-Ups =

1973 film by Philip D'Antoni

- Film poster
- Directed by: Philip D'Antoni
- Screenplay by: Albert Ruben; Alexander Jacobs
- Story by: Sonny Grosso
- Produced by: Philip D'Antoni
- Starring: Roy Scheider; Tony Lo Bianco; Bill Hickman; Larry Haines; Richard Lynch; Ken Kercheval
- Cinematography: Urs Furrer
- Edited by: John C. Horger; Stephen A. Rotter; Gerald B. Greenberg (supervising editor); Cynthia Scheider (assistant editor)
- Music by: Don Ellis
- Distributed by: 20th Century Fox
- Release date: December 14, 1973
- Running time: 103 minutes
- Country: United States
- Language: English
- Budget: $2,425,000
- Box office: $6,007,464 (domestic)

The Seven-Ups is a 1973 American action thriller film produced and directed by Philip D'Antoni. It stars Roy Scheider as a crusading policeman who is the leader of the Seven-Ups, a squad of plainclothes officers who use dirty, unorthodox tactics to snare their quarry on charges leading to prison sentences of seven years or more upon prosecution, hence the name of the team.

D'Antoni took his sole directing credit on this film. He was earlier responsible for producing the action thriller Bullitt, followed by The French Connection (co-starring Scheider), which won him the 1971 Academy Award for Best Picture. All three feature memorable car chase sequences coordinated by Bill Hickman.

Several other people who worked on The French Connection were also involved in this film, such as Scheider, screenwriter and police technical advisor Sonny Grosso, composer Don Ellis, and stunt coordinator Bill Hickman. 20th Century Fox was again the distributor.

Buddy Manucci, played by Scheider, is a loose remake of the character of Buddy "Cloudy" Russo he played in The French Connection, a character who also used dirty tactics to capture his enemies, and who was also based on Sonny Grosso.

== Plot ==
NYPD Detective Buddy Manucci has been under pressure from the senior officers in the New York City police force because his team of renegade policemen, known as the "seven-ups" (so called because most criminals they arrest receive sentences from seven years and up) have been using unorthodox methods to arrest criminals; this is illustrated as the team ransacks an antiques store that is a front for the running of counterfeit money. Buddy received information about the counterfeit ring from his regular snitch & childhood friend, informant Vito Lucia.

There has been a growing rash of kidnappings of organized crime figures and white-collar criminals in the city. Max Kalish, a high-level racketeer & loan shark, is kidnapped from his house by two strangers impersonating police detectives. A ransom for his release is paid at a car wash. Manucci, while making the rounds through his old neighborhood, is tipped off by a local barber & family friend that he has witnessed an increased presence of guns on the streets during the last few months. This causes Buddy and the squad to start trailing some of the key crime figures to gather clues for the escalating unrest and tensions amongst the local syndicate.

They learn of the kidnappings when crooked bail bondsman Festa is grabbed in public by two men claiming to be from the District Attorney's office. Buddy seeks more information from Vito, who turns out to be untrustworthy. Unbeknownst to Buddy, Vito is the mastermind behind the kidnapping operation. He works with the two thugs, Moon & Bo, who have been performing all the kidnappings by impersonating various authority figures.

The squad stake out a funeral meeting of Kalish and his people, disaster follows, and it leads to shootings causing the death of one of the Seven-up officers and life-threatening injuries to one of the crime family members. A violent car chase ensues as Buddy chases after the shooters, Moon and Bo, which takes them throughout Upper Manhattan and beyond. Other officers give chase and attempt to block the two at the George Washington Bridge but Moon and Bo crash through the police barricade and continue across the bridge and on to the Palisades Interstate Parkway in New Jersey. They escape when Buddy's car violently collides into a truck, shearing off the roof. Miraculously, he survives the near-fatal accident.

Manucci and the rest of the Seven-Ups are placed on suspension pending investigation as NYPD Internal Affairs considers them prime suspects of the kidnappings. This leaves the squad to continue piecing together the puzzle on their own. After Buddy and his squad break into the house of Max Kalish and his wife, confronting them at gunpoint, the information collected from Max allows Manucci to fill in the final blanks of who is responsible for all the kidnappings.

Buddy meets up with Vito again, intentionally setting him up for failure by giving him false information in an attempt to smoke out the kidnappers/shooters. Buddy's plan involves staking out the house of a parking garage worker who was involved with the kidnapping causing the shootings. Falsely informing Vito earlier that the garage worker in question possesses all the info needed to pursue and convict all of the kidnapping suspects, Vito then notifies his associates, Moon & Bo, who follow the garage worker to his house in an attempt to assassinate him. They are then intercepted by the Seven-Ups. After a subsequent gunfight and a short foot chase, Moon & Bo are both killed.

The next day, Buddy meets up with Vito one last time informing him his game is up, but promises he won't be arresting him. Instead, he will ensure the local crime families are all notified how Vito was responsible for the kidnappings and ransom extorted from them. Buddy then walks away leaving a now very terrified and emotionally distressed Lucia to contemplate his fate.

== Cast ==
- Roy Scheider as Detective Buddy Manucci
- Tony Lo Bianco as Vito Lucia
- Larry Haines as Max Kalish
- Richard Lynch as Moon
- Bill Hickman as Bo
- Jerry Leon as Mingo
- Victor Arnold as Barilli
- Ken Kercheval as Ansel
- Lou Polan as Carmine Coltello
- Matt Russo as Festa
- Joe Spinell as Toredano
- Robert Burr as Lieutenant Hanes
- Rex Everhart as Inspector Gilson
- David Wilson as Bobby
- Ed Jordan as Bruno
- Mary Multari as Mrs Pugliese
- Frank Mascetta as barber
- Frances Chaney as Sara Kalish
- Mike Treanor as policeman
- Benny Marino as Festa's Son
- Bill Funaro as Big Bill
- Billy Longo as mobster #1
- Ace Alagna as mobster #2
- Sheldon Adler as doctor
- Adeline Leonard as nurse
- Edward Carey as police commissioner

== Production ==
The film was announced in July 1971. Canadian TV writer Philip Hersch was hired by producer Phil d'Antoni to write the script based on the real life exploits of Sonny Grosso and Eddie Egan. While making The French Connection, Grosso told d'Antoni the story of "the kidnapping of mobsters by cops who weren't really cops," said the producer. "A very weird and fascinating story." It was about a group of police in the 1950s who were only assigned felonies where the penalties were seven years and up.

The French Connection was a big box-office success and 20th Century Fox agreed to let D'Antoni direct. "We kind of agreed the best one to direct this would be me," he said.

== Filming locations ==
Filming locations include Manhattan, Brooklyn, New Jersey, Westchester County, and the Bronx.

Festa's abduction takes place in Brooklyn, across from the old courthouse on Court and Montague Streets near Cadman Plaza. Buddy makes his rounds in and around Arthur Avenue and the Arthur Avenue Retail Market in the Bronx.

Moon pays off Vito at the New York Botanical Garden. Buddy and Vito meet at the track field between De Witt Clinton High School and Bronx High School of Science, and object to the new Tracey Towers housing project looming in the background. Kalish's house is at W. 246th Street and Fieldston Road in Riverdale.

The funeral-home sequence where Ansel is abducted was filmed at the side entrance to Lucia Brothers Funeral Home on the corner of E. 184th and Hoffman Streets. Buddy and his partner are staking out the funeral home from an upstairs apartment across the street, in a building located at 2324 Hoffman Street. In the background, one can see the elevated IRT Third Avenue Line of the New York City Subway, which was dismantled shortly after this movie was filmed. Aside from the Third Avenue Line and the fact that the one-way vehicle traffic on Hoffman Street has since been reversed, the locations remain today for the most part as they did in the movie. The funeral procession then rides on Pelham Parkway.

The climactic shootout scene at the end of the movie was filmed in areas just outside Co-op City's Section Five, at what today is Erskine Place, between De Reimer and Palmer Avenues.

== Car chase ==
Similar to Bullitt and The French Connection, Philip D'Antoni again used stunt coordinator and driver Bill Hickman (who also has a small role in the film) to help create the chase sequence for this film. Filmed in and around Upper Manhattan, New York City, the sequence was edited by Gerald B. Greenberg (credited as Jerry Greenberg), who also has an associate producer credit on this film and who won an Academy Award for his editing work on The French Connection.

In the chase sequence, which occurs near the middle of the film, Hickman's car is being chased by Scheider. The chase itself borrows heavily from the Bullitt chase, with the two cars bouncing down the gradients of uptown New York (like the cars on San Francisco's steep hills in the earlier film) with Hickman's 1973 Pontiac Grand Ville sedan pursued by Scheider's 1973 Pontiac Ventura coupe. While Scheider did some of his own driving, most of it was done by Hollywood stunt man Jerry Summers.

The chase scene was filmed on the Upper West Side, including West 96th Street, on the George Washington Bridge, and on New Jersey's Palisades Interstate Parkway and New York's Taconic State Parkway and New York's Saw Mill River Parkway

In the accompanying behind-the-scenes featurette of the 2006 DVD release of the film, Hickman can be seen co-ordinating, from the street, a chase scene wherein a stuntman in a parked car opens his door as Hickman's vehicle takes it off its hinges. The end of the chase was Hickman's homage to the accidental death of film icon Jayne Mansfield, where Scheider's car (driven by Summers) smashes into the back of a parked tractor-trailer, shearing off most of the top portion of the car. (Hickman had been a witness to the car accident death of fellow 50s icon James Dean).

== Reception ==
Reviewing the movie in 2017, film critic David Brook wrote:

Scheider starred in a number of cast-iron classics in his time, but is rarely given the credit he deserves as one of the finest actors of his generation, largely because his decent roles dried up for whatever reason after the 70s. Here he's his tough but relatable best, reprising, but not lazily recycling his role in The French Connection. The pace and direction is strong too, delivering a taut and exciting thriller. The story, although a little cliched at times, is enjoyable, providing a look at three sides of the case – that of the police, the kidnappers and the Mafia who are trying to find the culprits themselves. The latter are lead to believe the ‘Seven-Ups’ are the kidnappers too, which adds a nice twist. I also like the way the police's brutal tactics are nastier than the activities of the mob, who largely act like businessmen more than criminals.

The Seven-Ups has a score of 73% on Rotten Tomatoes based on 11 reviews.

In 2025, Chloe Walker for Sight and Sound magazine listed The Seven-Ups as one of the ten best films by a one-time director.

== See also ==
- List of American films of 1973
