= Philip D'Antoni =

American film producer

- Born: February 19, 1929; New York City, New York, U.S.
- Died: April 15, 2018 (aged 89); Hastings-on-Hudson, New York, U.S.
- Resting place: Gate of Heaven Cemetery
- Occupations: Film producer; film director; television producer
- Spouse: Ruth D'Antoni (Wiederecht)

Philip D'Antoni (February 19, 1929 – April 15, 2018) was an American film and television producer. He was best known for producing the Oscar-winning crime films The French Connection (1971) and Bullitt (1968).

== Early life ==
D'Antoni attended Evander Childs High School in the Bronx. He then served in the United States Army from 1946 to 1948 during the occupation of Japan after World War II. He was eventually assigned to Special Services where he entertained troops by participating in theatrical productions. After army service, he attended Fordham University from 1948 to 1950, where he worked during the day and attended school at night, and graduated with a degree in business administration.

== Career ==
D'Antoni began his career on television with the production of the specials Sophia Loren in Rome, Elizabeth Taylor in London and Melina Mercouri in Greece.

He produced Bullitt in 1968. In 1971, he produced The French Connection, which won the Academy Award for Best Picture, among other wins at the Oscars. In 1973, he produced and directed The Seven-Ups. After The Seven-Ups, D'Antoni, who held the rights to French Connection II and Gerald Walker's novel Cruising, eschewed feature filmmaking and turned his attention to television production where he enjoyed a lucrative contract with NBC.

D'Antoni's crime dramas are characterized by a cold, gritty, "street" perspective with documentary style, often filmed during the bleak New York winter months, and offer the viewer a realistic and often dangerous sense of being an insider, as opposed to using glamorous locations or produced sets.

D'Antoni's television production credits include:

- Elizabeth Taylor in London (1963)
- Sophia Loren in Rome (1964)
- The Connection (1973)
- Mr. Inside/Mr. Outside (1974)
- In Tandem (1974; pilot film for Movin' On)
- Movin' On (1974)
- Strike Force (1975)
- Shark Kill (1976)

== Awards ==
D'Antoni won the Academy Award in 1972 for Best Picture and the Golden Globe award for Best Motion Picture Drama for The French Connection.
