= Movin' On (TV series) =

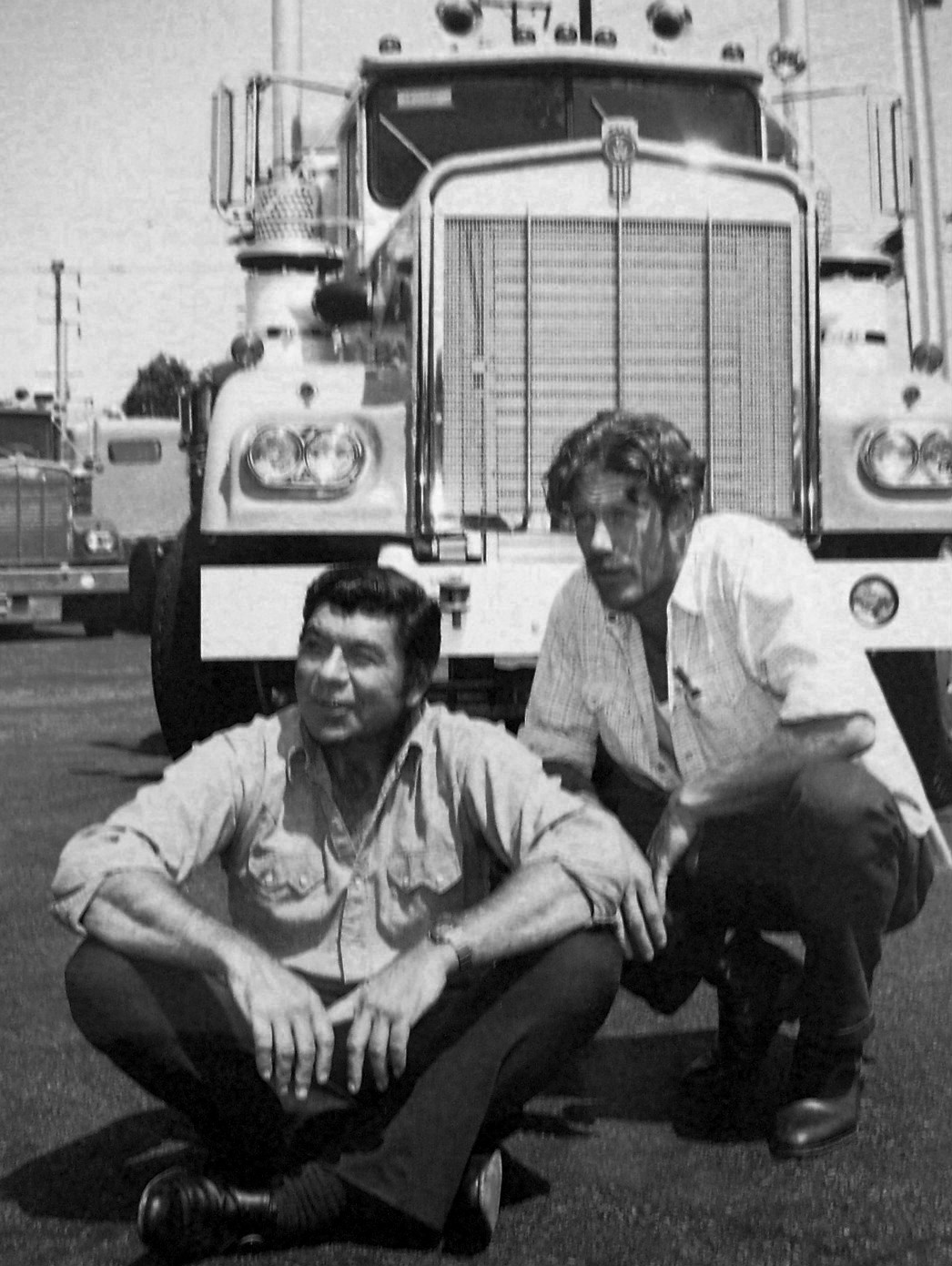
- Photo from the September 1974 series premiere
- Genre: Drama
- Created by: Philip D'Antoni; Barry J. Weitz
- Written by: Stanley Z. Cherry; Phillip D'Antoni; George Kirgo; Ken Kolb; Eugene Price; Barry J. Weitz
- Starring: Claude Akins; Frank Converse
- Theme music composer: Merle Haggard
- Composers: Earle Hagen; John Scott
- Country of origin: United States
- Original language: English
- No. of seasons: 2
- No. of episodes: 44(+1 television film)

Production
- Executive producers: Philip D'Antoni; Barry J. Weitz
- Producers: Ernie Frankel; Joseph Gantman
- Camera setup: Single-camera
- Running time: 60 minutes
- Production company: D'Antoni/Weitz Television Productions

Original release
- Network: NBC
- Release: May 8, 1974 – March 2, 1976

Related
- In Tandem (television film)

Movin' On is an American drama television series. It ran for two seasons from 1974 to 1976 on the NBC network.

== Synopsis ==
Movin' On stars Claude Akins as old-time independent "big-rig" truck driver Sonny Pruitt, and Frank Converse as his college-educated co-driver Will Chandler. The theme song, "Movin' On", was written and performed by Merle Haggard, and was a No. 1 single on the Billboard Hot Country Singles chart in July 1975.

The series was likened to Route 66 and Cannonball, following a similar format. Episodes usually centered on Sonny and Will, always traveling, becoming involved in the lives of people they met (or met again) in the various places they found themselves.

The pilot episode was a made-for-television film originally titled In Tandem — a reference to the tandem axles on the tractor and trailer, as well as that they drove as a team, or "in tandem". The film begins with Will sliding out of control in a truck he was driving, due to poor maintenance of the brakes. After he manages to stop the truck, he drives to a truck stop and calls the company to quit his job. He then meets Sonny, a "gypsy" trucker, and they decide to try driving as a team, which works out well.

The truck tractor featured on the pilot episode was a dark green 38 single sleeper Kenworth W-925, but was later changed to a 60 double sleeper throughout the series. Movin' On was filmed on location all over the United States, including Glen Burnie, Maryland; Mobile, Alabama; Sedona, Arizona; Phoenix, Arizona; San Diego and San Francisco, California; Buford and Jonesboro, Georgia; Durham and Charlotte, North Carolina; Astoria, Portland, The Dalles, Seaside and Hood River, Oregon; and Norfolk, Virginia. Parts of the series were also filmed in Salt Lake City, Heber City and Midway, Utah.

Akins and Converse actually drove the trucks during filming, having been trained and obtaining their chauffeur's licenses (forerunner to the commercial driver's license) prior to making the pilot episode. Executive producers for the series were Barry Weitz and Philip D'Antoni. Akins later went on to appear in another trucking-related TV series, the more comedy-oriented B. J. and the Bear.

== Episode list ==
=== Pilot (1974) ===
No.	Title	Directed by	Written by	Original release date
0	"In Tandem"	Bernard L. Kowalski	Robert Collins & Herb Meadow	May 8, 1974

=== Season 1 (1974–1975) ===
No. overall	No. in season	Title	Directed by	Written by	Original release date
1	1	"The Time of His Life"	Walter Doniger	George Kirgo	September 12, 1974
2	2	"Roadblock"	John Peyser	Robert Lewin	September 19, 1974
3	3	"Grit"	Hy Averback	William Putman	September 26, 1974
4	4	"Lifeline"	John Peyser	James Menzies	October 3, 1974
5	5	"The Trick Is to Stay Alive"	Michael O'Herlihy	Dan Ullman	October 10, 1974
6	6	"The Cowhands"	Paul Stanley	Eugene Price	October 24, 1974
7	7	"The Good Life"	Richard Benedict	George Kirgo	November 7, 1974
8	8	"Games"	Charles S. Dubin	Stephen Kandel	November 14, 1974
9	9	"Hoots"	Michael O'Herlihy	Jim Byrnes	November 21, 1974
10	10	"Good for Laughs"	Sutton Roley	Mann Rubin	November 28, 1974
11	11	"High Rollers"	Leonard Horn	Ken Kolb	December 5, 1974
12	12	"Goin' Home: Part 1"	Paul Stanley	George Kirgo	December 12, 1974
13	13	"Goin' Home: Part 2"	Paul Stanley	George Kirgo	December 19, 1974
14	14	"Antiques"	Charles S. Dubin	Eugene Price	December 26, 1974
15	15	"Explosion"	Richard Newton	Jack March	January 2, 1975
16	16	"Landslide"	George Fenady	Ken Kolb	January 16, 1975
17	17	"Fraud"	Seymour Robbie	Michael Fisher	January 30, 1975
18	18	"Ammo"	George Fenady	Robert C. Dennis	February 6, 1975
19	19	"Tattoos"	Michael O'Herlihy	Story by : John G. Wilson & Ken Kolb; Teleplay by : Ken Kolb	February 13, 1975
20	20	"Ransom"	Alex Grasshoff	Stephen Kandel	February 20, 1975
21	21	"The Price of Loving"	Seymour Robbie	Eugene Price	March 6, 1975
22	22	"Weddin' Bells"	Michael O'Herlihy	George Kirgo	March 13, 1975

=== Season 2 (1975–76) ===
No. overall	No. in season	Title	Directed by	Written by	Original release date
23	1	"Stowaway"	Corey Allen	Gwen Bagni & Paul DuBov	September 9, 1975
24	2	"From Baltimore to Eternity"	Allen Reisner	Jimmy Sangster	September 16, 1975
25	3	"The Toughest Men in America"	Lawrence Dobkin	David Harmon	September 23, 1975
26	4	"The Elephant Story"	Leo Penn	Stanley Z. Cherry	September 30, 1975
27	5	"A Home Is Not a House"	Jack Priestley	Story by : Karl & Terence Tunberg; Teleplay by : Jimmy Sangster	October 7, 1975
28	6	"...To Be in Carolina"	Michael Schultz	Gwen Bagni & Paul DuBov	October 14, 1975
29	7	"Will the Last Trucker Leaving Charlotte Please Turn Out the Lights?"	Ernest Pintoff	Glenn Schiffman	October 21, 1975
30	8	"General Delivery"	Leo Penn	David Harmon	November 4, 1975
31	9	"The Big Wheel"	Allen Reisner	Jimmy Sangster	November 11, 1975
32	10	"Prosperity #1"	Corey Allen	Ron Bishop	November 18, 1975
33	11	"Please Don't Talk to the Driver"	Jack Priestley	Jimmy Sangster	November 25, 1975
34	12	"Long Way to Nowhere"	Jerry Jameson	David Harmon	December 9, 1975
35	13	"Breakout"	Lawrence Dobkin	Jimmy Sangster	December 16, 1975
36	14	"Love, Death and Laura Brown"	Lawrence Dobkin	Nancy Greenwald	December 23, 1975
37	15	"The Old South Will Rise Again"	Bob Kelljan	Jimmy Sangster	January 6, 1976
38	16	"Witch Hunt"	Jack Arnold	Orville H. Hampton	January 13, 1976
39	17	"The Big Switch"	Allen Reisner	Jimmy Sangster	January 20, 1976
40	18	"Woman of Steel"	Lawrence Dobkin	Phyllis & Robert White	January 27, 1976
41	19	"Living It Up!"	Anton M. Leader	Jimmy Sangster & Ernie Frankel	February 10, 1976
42	20	"No More Sad Songs"	Bob Kelljan	Jimmy Sangster	February 17, 1976
43	21	"Full Fathom Five"	Leo Penn	Jimmy Sangster	February 24, 1976
44	22	"Sing It Again, Sonny"	Jack Arnold	Story by : Stanley Z. Cherry; Teleplay by : Jim Allen	March 2, 1976

== Home media ==
On September 20, 2017, the first & second seasons of Movin' On were released on manufactured-on-demand DVD by Allied Vaughn & Pro Classic TV.

DVD name	Ep #	Release date
The Complete First Season	22	September 20, 2017
The Complete Second Season	22	September 20, 2017

== References in popular culture ==
The CB radio boom of the mid-1970s, figured into a merchandising tie-in for the show, and Movin' On-brand walkie-talkies, which worked on CB channel 14, were marketed to children.

During the series, truck drivers on the CB would say that they were going to "do it like Pruitt". After the series ended, the phrase became "do it like Pruitt used to do it." This phrase could still be heard occasionally 30 years later.
