= Pontiac Grand Ville =

Full-sized car produced by Pontiac (1971-1975)

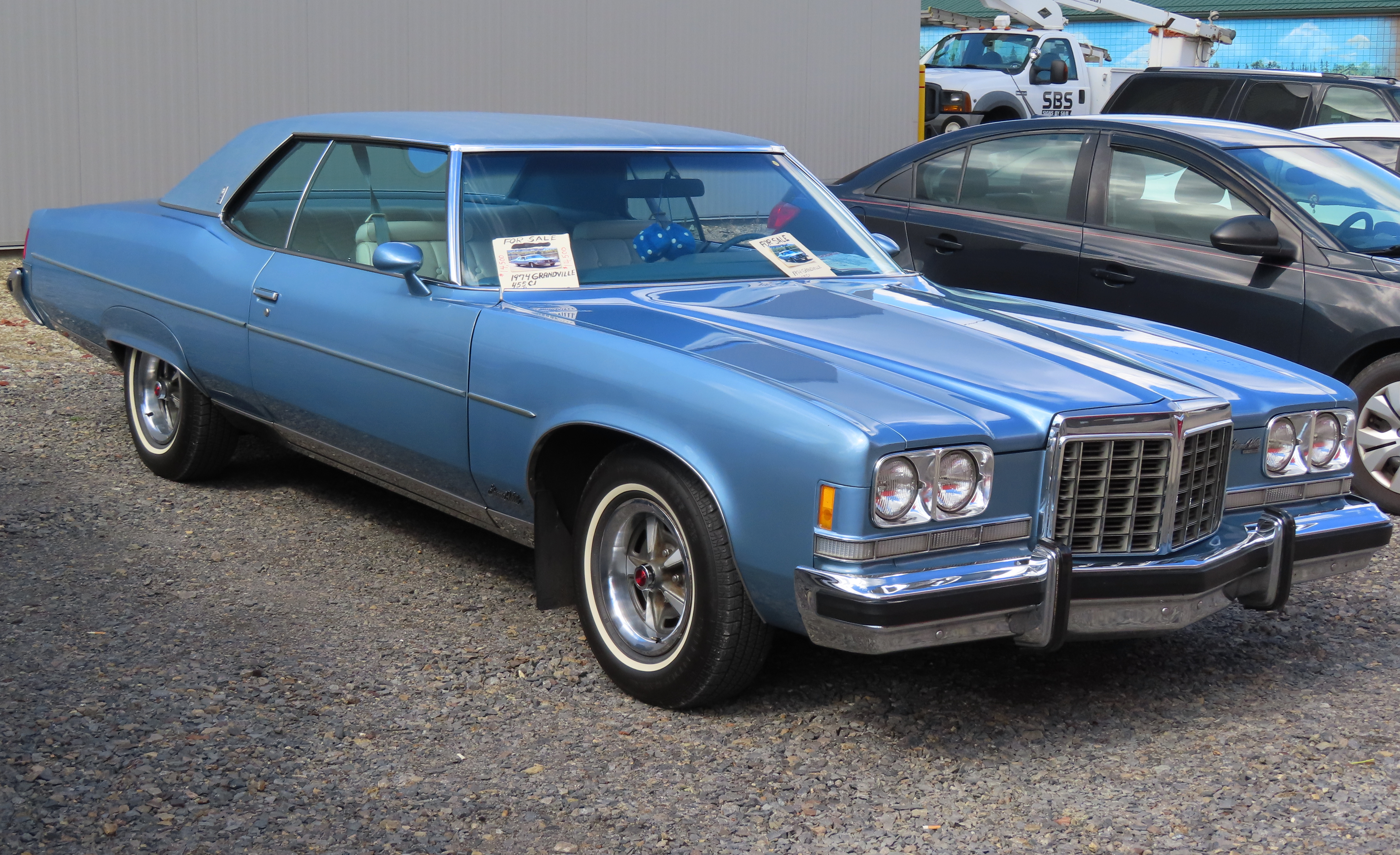

Overview
- Manufacturer: Pontiac (General Motors)
- Model years: 1971–1975
- Assembly: (main plant); Pontiac, Michigan, USA (Pontiac Assembly) (branch assembly); Kansas City, Kansas, USA (Fairfax Assembly); South Gate, California, United States (South Gate Assembly)

Body and chassis
- Class: Full-size
- Body style: 4-door hardtop 2-door hardtop 2-door convertible 5-door station wagon (1973-1975)
- Layout: FR layout
- Platform: B-body
- Related: Buick Centurion; Buick LeSabre; Chevrolet Caprice; Chevrolet Impala; Oldsmobile 88 Royale; Pontiac Bonneville; Pontiac Catalina

Powertrain
- Engine: 400 cu in (6.6 L); 455 cu in (7.5 L)

Dimensions
- Wheelbase: 126 in (3,200 mm) (1971-72); 124 in (3,150 mm) (1973-74); 123.4 in (3,134 mm) (1975)
- Length: 226.2 in (5,745 mm)
- Width: 79.5 in (2,019 mm)

Chronology
- Successor: Pontiac Bonneville Brougham

The Pontiac Grand Ville is a full-size car that was Pontiac's top-line model from 1971 to 1975.

The Bonneville, previously the top model line, was downgraded and in effect replaced the Pontiac Executive. The Grand Ville and Bonneville shared a number of trim and design elements that distinguished them from the Catalina, and the 1971-72 Grand Villes were built on a stretched-wheelbase version of the GM "B" platform that nevertheless had identical interior dimensions to all other full-size Pontiacs.

In addition to more luxurious interior trimmings, the Grand Ville had distinctive chrome trim at the front and rear to set it apart from the rest of the Pontiac line. Between 1971 and 1974 Grand Ville hardtops featured more upright "formal" C-pillar and backlight treatments that were similar to those found on contemporary GM "C" platform cars (Oldsmobile Ninety Eight and Buick Electra) and not shared with the Bonneville or Catalina. For 1974 only, the Grand Ville had unique parking lights which wrapped around the corner of the front fender. The car was often sold with deluxe appearance options, such as sport wheels and vinyl tops. Rear fender skirts were featured on the 1973 to 1975 models.

Standard equipment on Grand Ville models included a 455 cubic-inch V8 (for 1975, a 400 cubic-inch V8 was standard and the 455 optional), Turbo-Hydramatic automatic transmission, power steering and power front disc brakes. Popular options included air conditioning, power windows and driver's seat, tilt steering wheel, cruise control, AM/FM stereo with tape deck and much more. One of the rarest options available on Grand Villes and other full-sized Pontiacs during this period was the adjustable brake and accelerator pedals offered from 1974 to 1976.

The Grand Ville enjoyed moderate success from 1971 to 1973. However, the oil crisis of late 1973 and early 1974 led to gasoline shortages, long lines at filling stations, and high fuel prices. These factors sharply cut into full-sized car sales in 1974 as buyers moved towards smaller cars. For 1975, the Grand Ville became the Grand Ville Brougham and included more standard equipment than in previous years, such as power windows and a carpeted trunk. This would be the final year for the Grand Ville series, which included Pontiac's last convertible until 1983. For 1976, the Grand Ville nameplate was dropped and the lineup was renamed Bonneville Brougham, returning that nameplate back to its former full-size top trim level status.

Grand Ville convertibles were rare, with production never exceeding 5,000 units per year during the model run. From 1973 to 1975 the Grand Ville was Pontiac's only full-size convertible offering; 1971 and 1972 full-size Pontiac convertibles were offered in the entry level Catalina line as well. (There were no convertible Bonnevilles after the 1970 model year.) The rarest of the Grand Ville convertibles was the 1971 model with just under 1,800 examples built. The 1975 model was the most plentiful with just over 4,500 cars built, as being the final year of production increased demand. The Grand Ville convertible had the lowest production amongst its corporate cousins, the Oldsmobile 88 Royale, Buick Centurion and the Chevrolet Caprice Classic convertible lines.

Starting with 1973 through 1975 the Grand Ville was offered as a station wagon as the Grand Safari.

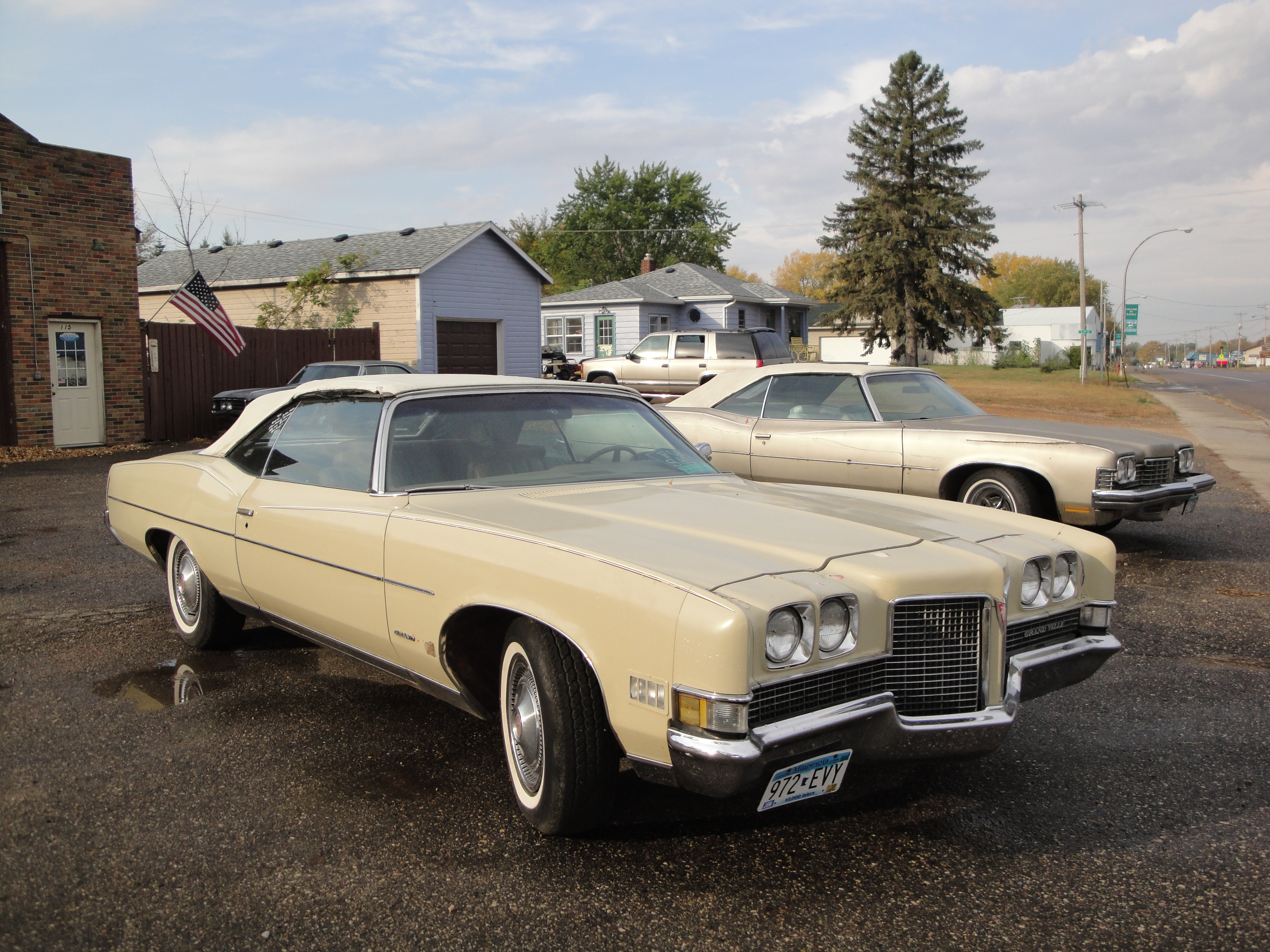
1971 Pontiac Grand Ville Convertible

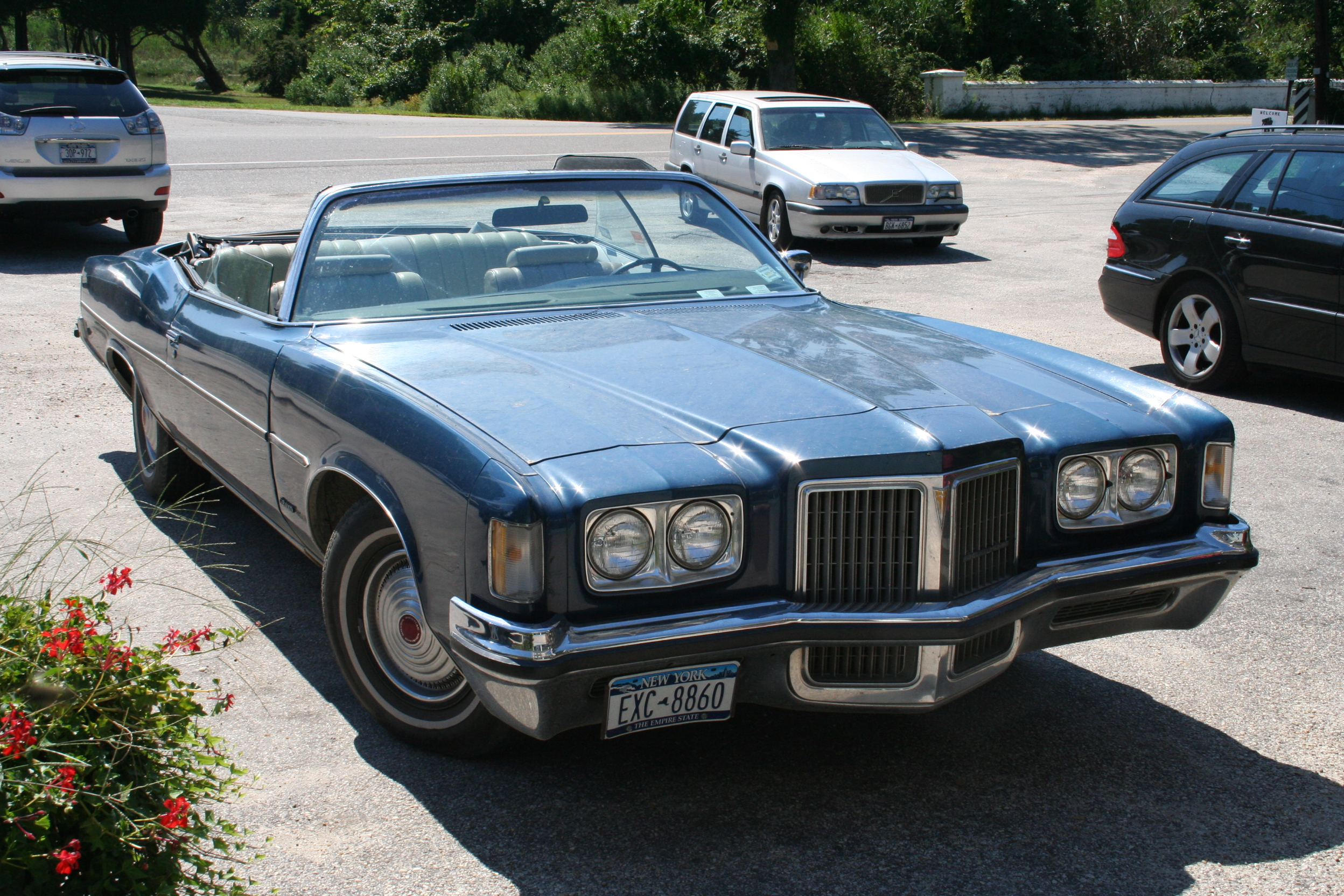
1972 Pontiac Grand Ville Convertible

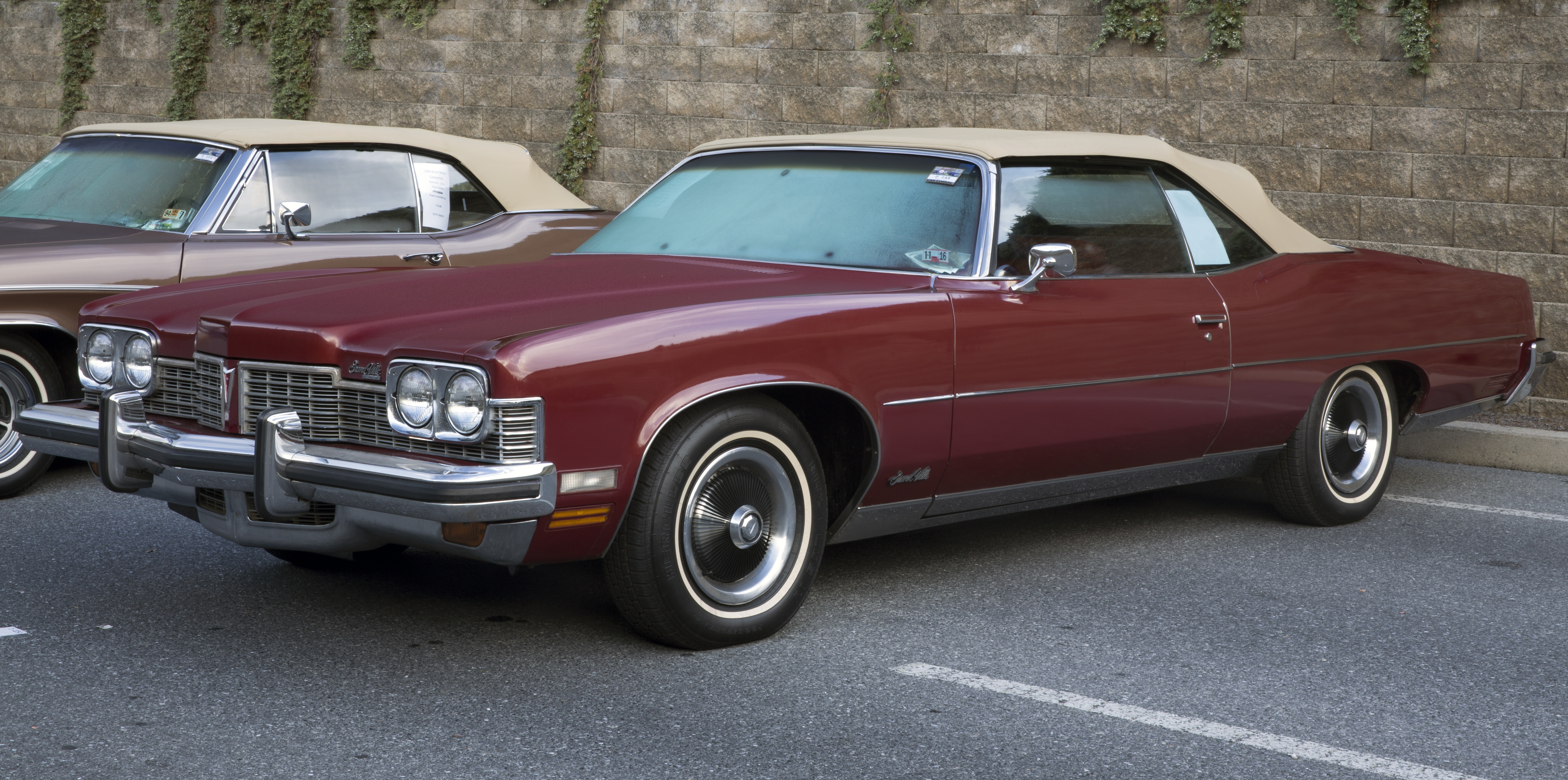
1973 Pontiac Grand Ville Convertible

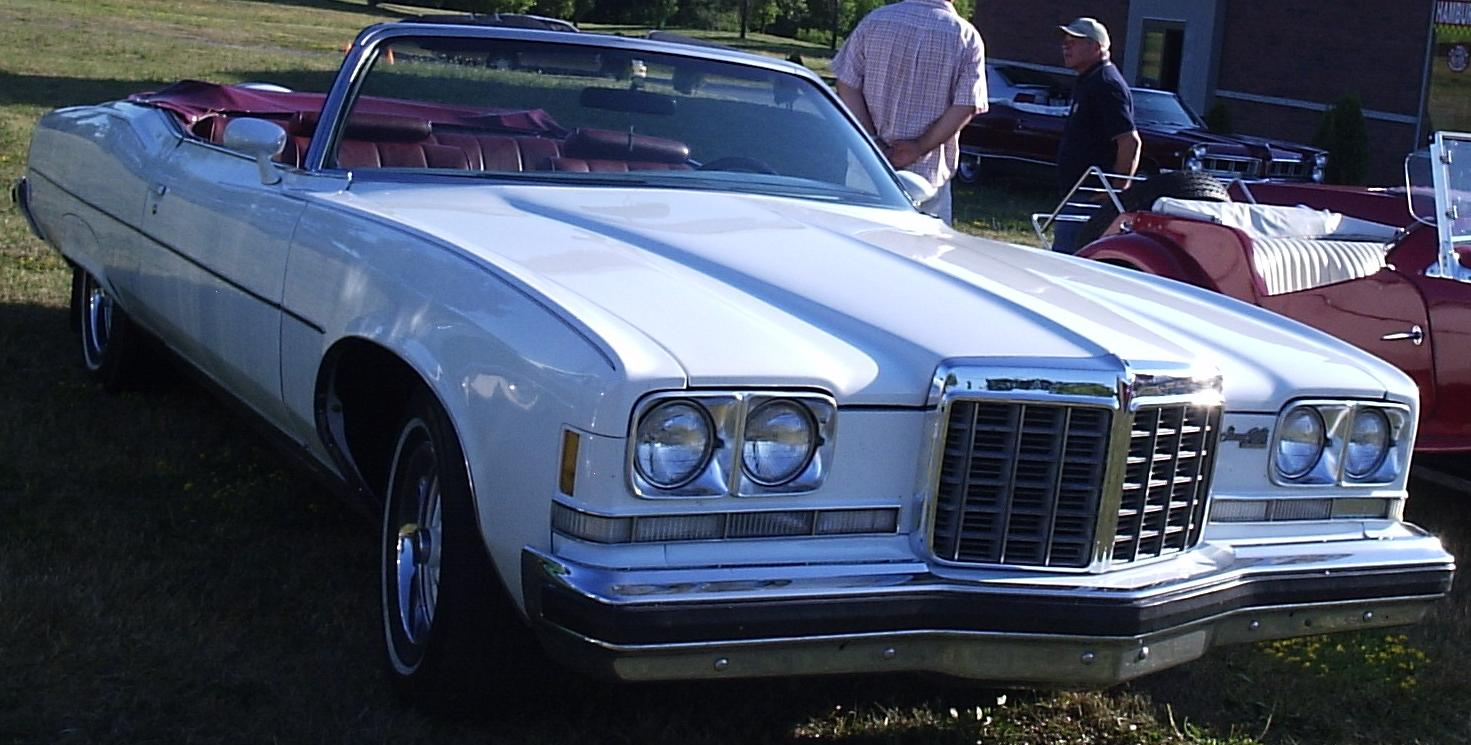
1974 Pontiac Grand Ville convertible

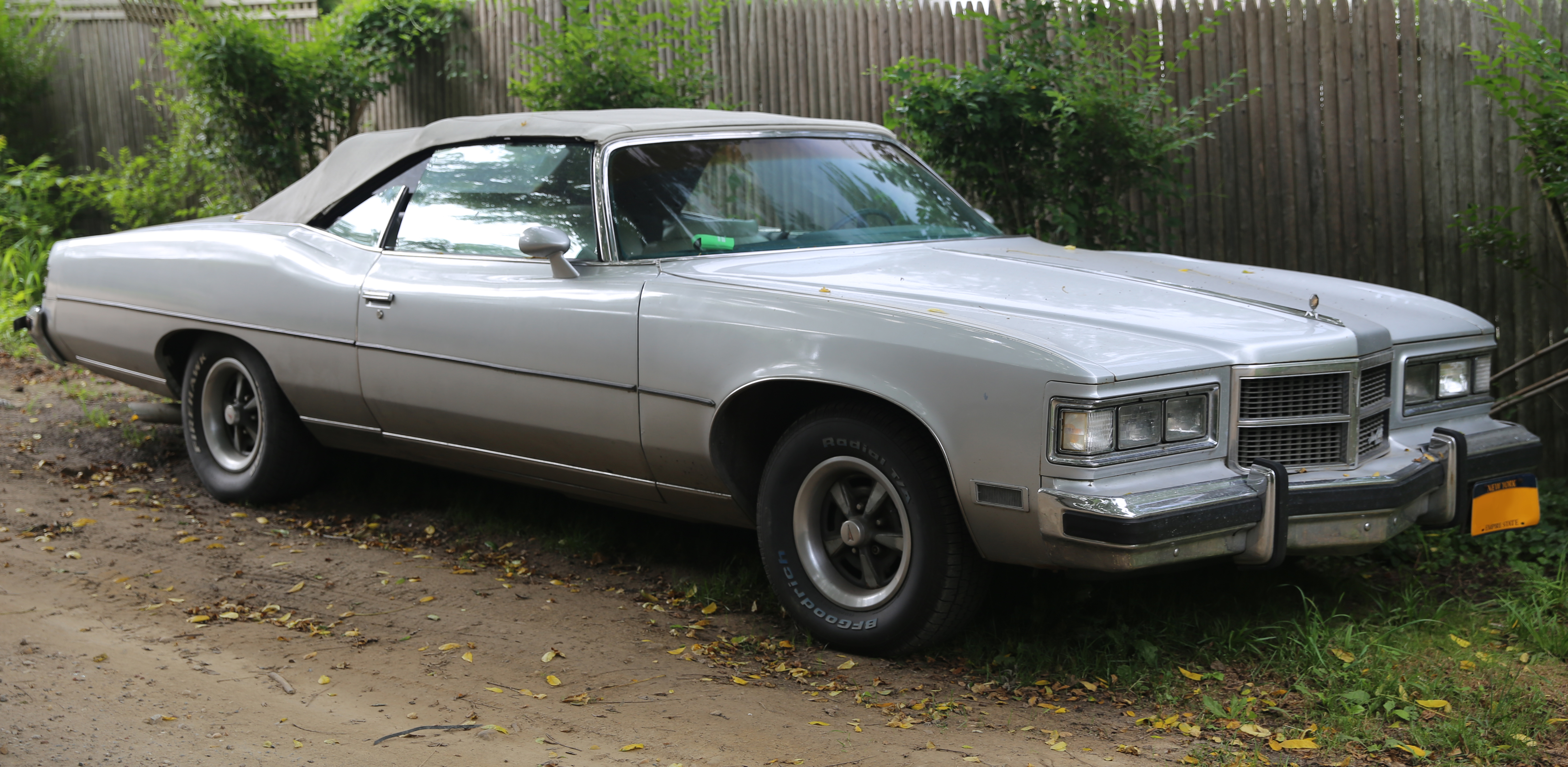
1975 Pontiac Grand Ville convertible

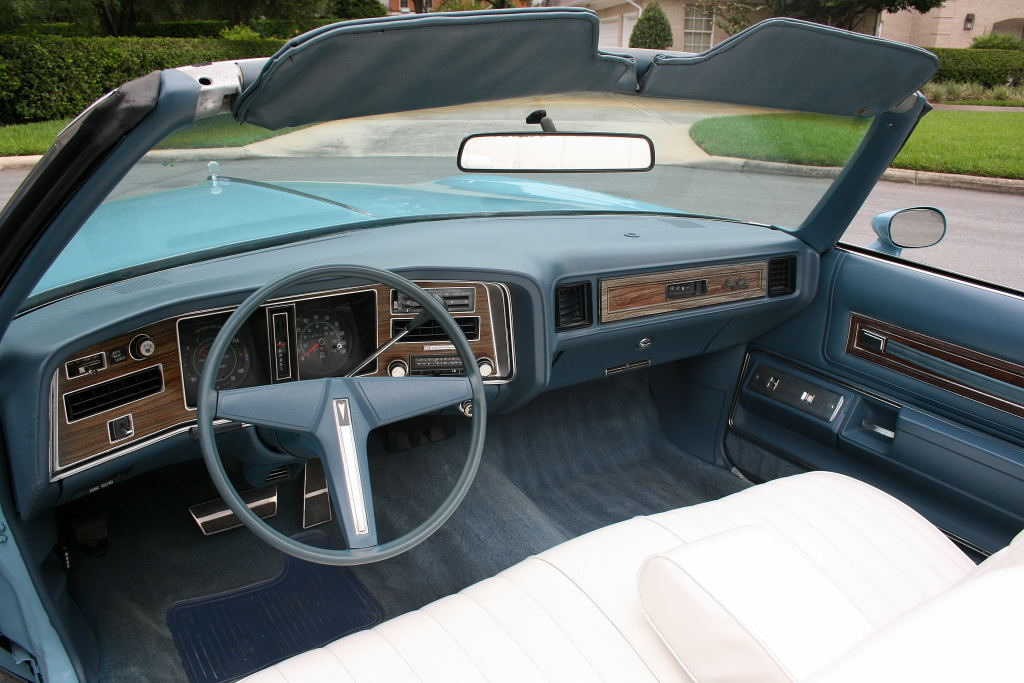
1975 interior

Pontiac Grand Ville Production Figures
	Sedan	Coupe	Convertible	Yearly Total
1971	30,524	14,017	1,784	46,325
1972	41,346	19,852	2,213	63,411
1973	44,092	23,963	4,447	72,502
1974	21,714	11,631	3,000	36,345
1975	15,686	7,447	4,519	27,652
Total	197,454	76,910	15,963	290,327
