= List of Italian-American mobsters by organization =

This list includes Italian American mobsters and organized crime figures by region and by American Mafia organization, both past and present.

== New York City ==
=== Genovese crime family ===
==== Boss/acting boss ====
- Giuseppe "the Clutch Hand" Morello – boss (1890s–1909)
- Nicholas "Nick" Morello – boss (1909–1916) killed in 1916
- Vincenzo "Vincent" Terranova – boss (1916–1920)
- Giuseppe "Joe the boss" Masseria – boss (1920–1931)
- Charlie "Lucky" Luciano – boss (1931–1946)
- Frank "The Prime Minister" Costello – acting boss (1936–1945), boss (1946–1957)
- "Don" Vito Genovese – underboss (1931–1936), boss (1957–1969)
- Anthony "Tony Bender" Strollo – acting boss (1959–1962)
- Thomas "Tommy Ryan" Eboli – acting boss (1962–1965)
- Frank Tieri – front boss (circa 1972–1981)
- Philip Lombardo – boss (1969–1981)
- Anthony "Fat Tony" Salerno – front boss (1981–1987)
- Vincent "Chin" Gigante – underboss (1981–1987), boss (1981–2005)
- Liborio Bellomo – acting boss (1990–1992), street boss (1992–1996), boss (2010–present)
- Dominick "Quiet Dom" Cirillo – acting boss (1997–1998)
- Matthew "Matty The Horse" Ianniello – acting boss (1997–2005)
- Mario Gigante – street boss (2006–2007)
- Daniel Leo (mobster) – acting boss (2005–2008)

==== Underboss/consigliere ====
- Willie Moretti – underboss, capo
- Venero Mangano – underboss, capo
- Gerardo Catena – underboss, capo
- Saverio Santora – underboss, capo
- Michele Miranda – consigliere
- Louis Manna – consigliere
- James Ida – consigliere
- Lawrence Dentico – consigliere

==== Capo/soldier/associate ====
- Joe Adonis – capo
- Adolfo Bruno - capo
- Peter DeFeo – capo
- Anthony Provenzano – capo
- Anthony Strollo – capo
- Tino Fiumara – capo
- Vincent Alo – capo
- Anthony Carfano – capo
- Michael Coppola – capo
- John Ardito – capo
- Angelo DeCarlo – capo
- Vincent Cafaro – soldier, government informant (1986)
- Joseph Lanza – soldier (circa 1920s–1968)
- Joseph Valachi – soldier, government informant
- Carmine Romano – soldier

=== Gambino crime family ===
==== Boss/acting boss ====
- Salvatore "Toto" D'Aquila boss (1916–1928)
- Manfredi "Al" Mineo – boss (1928–1930)
- Frank Scalice – boss (1930–1931)
- Vincent Mangano – boss (1931–1951)
- Albert "The Lord High Executioner" Anastasia – boss (1951–1957), underboss (1931–1951)
- Carlo "Don Carlo" Gambino – boss (1957–1976), underboss (1957)
- Paul "Big Paulie" Castellano – boss (1976–1985)
- John "The Teflon Don" Gotti – boss (1985–2002)
- Junior Gotti – acting boss (1992–1996, 1997–1999)
- Peter Gotti – boss (2002–2011); acting boss (1999–2002)
- Arnold Squitieri – acting boss (2002–2005)
- Jackie D'Amico – acting boss (2005)
- Nicholas Corozzo – acting boss (2005–2008)
- Jackie D'Amico – street boss (2008–2011)
- Domenico Cefalu – boss (2011–present)
- Frank Cali - acting boss (2015–2019)

==== Underboss/consigliere/capo ====
- Aniello "Mr. Niel" Dellacroce – underboss (1965–1985)
- Frank DeCicco – underboss (1985–1986)
- Joseph Armone – underboss (1986–1990), consigliere (1990–1992)
- Salvatore "Sammy the Bull" Gravano – underboss (1990–1992), consigliere (1987–1990)- Became a government informant
- Thomas Bilotti – underboss (1985)
- Frank Locascio – acting underboss (1986–1990), acting consigliere (1990–1992)
- Arnold Squitieri – acting boss (2002–2005)
- Joseph N. Gallo – consigliere (1957–1986)
- Joseph Corozzo – consigliere (1992–2024)
- Carmine Lombardozzi – capo
- Anthony Gaggi – capo
- Michael DiLeonardo – capo
- Anthony Scotto – capo
- Anthony Ciccone – capo
- Carmine Fatico – capo
- Angelo "Quack Quack" Ruggiero – capo
- Nicholas Corozzo – capo
- Gene Gotti – capo
- John A. Gotti – capo
- Richard V. Gotti – capo
- Ronnie Trucchio – capo
- Salvatore Scala – capo
- Salvatore LoCascio – capo
- Louis Ricco – capo
- James Squillante – capo
- James Failla – capo
- Thomas Gambino – capo
- Stephen Grammauta – capo
- George Remini – capo
- Jackie D'Amico – capo
- Leonard DiMaria – capo
- George DeCicco – capo
- Thomas Cacciopoli – capo
- Robert "DB" DiBernardo – capo
- John Gambino – capo
- Pasquale Conte – capo

==== Soldier/associate ====
- Roy DeMeo – soldier
- Joseph Paruta – soldier
- Joseph Vollaro – associate
- Dominick Montiglio – associate

=== Lucchese crime family ===
==== Boss/acting boss ====
- Gaetano Reina – boss (1916–1930)
- Joseph Pinzolo – boss (1930)
- Tommaso Gagliano – boss (1930–1951)
- Gaetano "Tommy Brown" Lucchese – boss (1951–1967); underboss (1931–1951)
- Carmine Tramunti – boss (1967–1973)
- Anthony Corallo – boss (1973–1986)
- Vic Amuso – boss (1987–2012)
- Alphonse D'Arco – acting boss (1990–1991); capo (1988–1991)
- Joseph DeFede – acting boss (1994–1998)
- Steven Crea – acting boss (1998–2001); underboss (1994–present)
- Matthew Madonna – acting boss (2009–2017)

==== Underboss/consigliere/capo/soldier/associate ====
- Anthony Casso – underboss (1989–1994)
- Salvatore Santoro – underboss (1979–1986)
- Joseph Caridi – consigliere (2003–present)
- Louis Daidone – consigliere (1993–2003)
- Frank Lastorino – consigliere (1989–1993)
- Christopher Furnari – consigliere (1974–1987)
- Paul Vario – consigliere (1972–1979); capo
- Aniello Migliore – capo
- Joseph DiNapoli – capo
- Joseph Abate – capo
- Peter Chiodo – capo
- Anthony Accetturo – capo
- Salvatore Avellino – capo
- Michael Taccetta – capo
- Martin Taccetta – capo
- Salvatore Avellino – capo
- Johnny Dio – capo
- Joseph Testa - soldier
- Anthony Senter - soldier
- Nicodemo "Nicky" Scarfo Jr - capo
- Henry Hill – associate (Irish-Italian)
- Thomas "Tommy" DeSimone – associate
- Vincent Papa – associate
- Anthony Loria Sr. – associate

=== Bonanno crime family ===
==== Boss/acting boss ====
- Nicolo Schiro – boss (1912–1930)
- Vito Bonventre – boss (1930)
- Salvatore Maranzano – boss (1930–1931)
- Joseph "Don Peppino" Bonanno – boss (1931–1965)
- Gaspar DiGregorio – boss (1965–1966)
- Paul Sciacca – boss (1966–1971)
- Natale Evola – boss (1971–1973); underboss (1968–1971)
- Carmine Galante – boss (1975–1979); underboss (1956–1962)
- Philip Rastelli – boss (1974–1975), (1979–1991); underboss (1970–1973)
- Joseph Massino – underboss (1981-1991), boss (1991–2004), became an informant
- Anthony Spero – acting boss (1987–1993)
- Vincent Basciano – acting boss (2004–2009)
- Salvatore Montagna – acting boss (2006–2009)

==== Underboss/consigliere/capo/soldier ====
- Salvatore Vitale – underboss (1991–2004); became an informant
- Richard Cantarella - acting underboss (2001-2002), became a government witness
- Nicholas Santora – acting underboss (2004-2007)
- Anthony Graziano – consigliere (2001–present)
- Dominick Napolitano – capo
- Alphonse Indelicato – capo
- Salvatore Bonanno – consigliere (1964–1966)
- Vincent Badalamenti - consigliere (2019–present)
- Michael Sabella – capo
- Philip Giaccone – capo
- Dominick Trinchera – capo
- Frank Coppa – capo
- Anthony Indelicato – capo
- Cesare Bonventre – soldier
- Benjamin "Lefty Guns" Ruggiero – soldier
- Thomas Pitera – soldier
- Anthony Mirra – soldier

=== Colombo crime family ===
==== Boss/acting boss ====
- Joseph Profaci – boss (1931–1961)
- Giuseppe Magliocco – underboss (1931–1962), boss (1962–1963)
- Joseph Colombo – boss (1963–1971)
- Carmine Persico – boss (1971–2019)
- Gennaro Langella – acting boss (1981–1984)
- Victor Orena – acting boss (1988–1992)
- Thomas Gioeli – acting boss (2001–present)
- Joel Cacace – acting boss (2000–2004)

==== Underboss/consigliere/capo/soldier ====
- John Franzese – underboss (1980–1995)
- Gennaro Langella – underboss (1972–1992)
- William Cutolo – underboss (1992–1999)
- John DeRoss – underboss (1999–2004)
- Carmine Sessa – consigliere (1988–1993)
- Charles Panarella – capo
- Vincenzo Aloi – capo
- Gregory Scarpa Sr. – capo
- Gregory Scarpa Jr. - capo
- Michael Franzese – capo
- Crazy Joe Gallo – soldier
- Ralph Scopo – soldier

== Chicago ==
=== Chicago Outfit ===
==== Boss/acting boss ====
- James "Big Jim" Colosimo – boss (1903–1920)
- Johnny "The Fox" Torrio – boss (1920–1925)
- Al "Scarface" Capone – boss (1925–1931)
- Frank "The Enforcer" Nitti – boss (1932–1943)
- Paul Ricca – boss (1943–1947)
- Tony Accardo – boss (1947–1957)
- Sam "Momo" Giancana – boss (1957–1966)
- Sam Battaglia – boss (1966–1967)
- Jackie Cerone – boss (1967–1969)
- Felix Alderisio – boss (1969–1971)
- Joseph Aiuppa – boss (1971–1986)
- Joseph Ferriola – boss (1986–1989)
- Samuel Carlisi – boss (1989–1993)
- Joseph Lombardo – boss (1993–present)
- James Marcello – front boss (2003–2007)
- John DiFronzo – official boss (1996-2018)
- Salvatore DeLaurentis – acting boss (2014–2018) official boss (2018–present)

===== Underboss/consigliere/capo =====
- Antonio Lombardo – consigliere (1925–1928)
- Jackie Cerone – underboss (1973–1986)
- Charles Fischetti – consigliere (1929–1947)
- Paul Ricca – consigliere (1947–1957)
- Tony "Joe Batters" Accardo – consigliere (1957–1992)
- Angelo J. LaPietra – consigliere (1997–1996)
- James Torello – capo
- Frank Calabrese – capo
- Nicholas Calabrese – acting capo, government witness

===== Soldier/associate's =====
- Jack McGurn - soldier
- Johnny Roselli - soldier
- Tony "The Ant" Spilotro – soldier
- Harry Aleman - soldier
- Charles Nicoletti - soldier
- Victor Spilotro - soldier
- Sam DeStefano - associate
- Michael Spilotro - associate
- Frank Cullotta - associate

=== Milwaukee crime family ===
==== Boss/acting boss ====
- Frank Balistrieri – boss (1961–1993)

== Philadelphia ==
=== Philadelphia crime family ===
==== Boss/acting boss ====
- Salvatore Sabella – boss (1911–1931)
- Joseph Ida – boss (1946–1959)
  - Antonio Pollina – acting boss (1958–1959)
- Angelo Bruno – boss (1959–1980)
- Philip Testa – boss (1980–1981)
- Nicodemo Scarfo – boss (1981–1991), consigliere (1980–1981)
- John Stanfa – boss (1991–1994)
- Joseph Merlino – boss (1994–present)
  - Ralph Natale – front boss (1994–1999)
  - Joseph Ligambi- acting boss (1999–2014), consigliere (2014-present)

==== Underboss/consigliere/capo/soldier ====
- Phil Leonetti – underboss (1986–1989)
- Frank Sindone – capo
- Salvatore Testa – capo
- Harry Riccobene – capo

== New Jersey ==
=== DeCavalcante crime family ===
==== Boss/acting boss ====
- Sam DeCavalcante – boss (1964–1976)
- Giovanni Riggi – boss (1970s–2015)
- John D'Amato – acting boss (1991–1992)
- Giacomo Amari – acting boss (1992–1994)
- Joseph Miranda – acting boss (2003–2006)
- Frank Guarraci – acting boss (2006–2016)
- Charles Majuri – official boss (2016–present)

==== Underbosses/consigliere/capo/soldier ====
- Girolamo Palermo – underboss (1976–1989)
- Giacomo Amari – underboss (1989–1994)
- Girolamo Palermo – underboss (1994–2000)
- Joseph Miranda – acting underboss (2003–2005) official underboss (2007–unknown)
- Frank Guarraci – capo
- Joseph Miranda – capo
- Gaetano Vastola – acting underboss (1990–1991)
- Vincent Palermo – capo
- Girolamo Palermo – capo
- Giuseppe Schifilliti – capo
- Philip Abramo – capo
- Anthony Capo – soldier
- Louis Consalvo – soldier

== New England ==
=== Patriarca crime family ===
==== Boss/acting boss ====
- Gaspare Messina – boss (1916–1924)
- Raymond L.S. Patriarca – underboss (1938–1952), boss (1952–1984)
- Nicholas Bianco – underboss (1990–1991), boss (1991)
- Frank Salemme – boss (1991–2000)
- Luigi Mannochio – boss (2000–present)

==== Underboss/consigliere/capo/soldier/associate ====
- Enrico Tameleo – underboss (1952–1968)
- Matthew Guglielmetti – capo (1991–present)
- Vincent Ferrara – capo (1986–1989)
- Robert Carrozza – capo
- Ilario Zannino – consigliere (1984–1987)
- Angelo Mercurio – soldier
- Angiulo Brothers
- Nicholas (Iggy) Vaccaro - associate

=== Winter Hill Gang ===
- Stephen "The Rifleman" Flemmi - Underboss, FBI informant
- Johnny Martorano - soldier, government witness

== Detroit ==
=== Detroit Partnership ===
==== Boss/acting boss ====
- Salvatore Catalanotte – boss (1921–1930)
- Gaspar Milazzo – boss (1930)
- Cesare Lamare – boss (1930–1931)
- William Tocco – boss (1931–1936)
- Joseph Zerilli – boss (1936–1977)
- Jack Tocco – boss (1977–2014)

==== Underboss/consigliere ====
- Anthony Joseph Zerilli – underboss (1977–2015)
- William Tocco – underboss (1936–1963)
- Angelo Meli – consigliere (1950s-1969)

== Buffalo ==
=== Buffalo crime family ===
==== Boss/acting boss ====
- Stefano Magaddino – boss (1922–1974)
- Joseph Todaro Sr. – boss (1984–2006)
- Joseph Todaro Jr. – boss (2006–present); acting boss (1995–2006)

== Pittsburgh ==
=== Pittsburgh crime family ===
- Frank Amato – boss (1937–1956)
- John Sebastian LaRocca – boss (1956–1978)
- Michael James Genovese – boss (1978–1984)

== Cleveland ==
=== Cleveland crime family ===
- Joseph Lonardo – boss (1920–1929)
- Salvatore Todaro – boss (1927–1929)
- Frank Milano – boss (1930–1935)
- Alfred Polizzi – boss (1936–1945)
- John T. Scalish – boss (1945–1976)
- James Licavoli – boss (1976–1985)
- John Tronolone – boss (1988-2013)

== Northeastern Pennsylvania, Upstate New York ==
=== Bufalino crime family ===
- Giacomo "John" Sciandra – boss (1933–1940)
- Giuseppe Barbara Sr. – boss (1940–1959)
- Russell Bufalino – boss (1959–1990)
- William D'Elia – boss (1994–2008)

== Los Angeles ==
=== Los Angeles crime family ===
==== Boss/acting boss ====
- Vito Di Giorgio – boss (1909–1922)
- Rosario DeSimone – boss (1922–1925)
- Joseph Ardizzone – boss (1925–1931)
- Jack Dragna – boss (1931–1957)
- Frank DeSimone – boss (1957–1967)
- Nick Licata – boss (1967–1974)
- Dominic Brooklier – boss (1974–1984)
  - Jimmy Fratianno – acting boss (1975–1977)

==== Underboss/consigliere/capo ====
- Simone Scozzari – underboss (1956–1962)
- Joseph Dippolito – underboss (1967–1974)
- Carmen Milano – underboss (1984–2006)
- Tom Dragna – consigliere (1931–1956)
- Frank Bompensiero – capo (1933–1977)
- Louis Tom Dragna – capo (1947–1985)
- Jimmy Caci – capo (late 1970s–2011)
- Mike Rizzitello - capo (1977-1990)

=== Cohen crime family ===
- Johnny Stompanato - (1947-1952)

== Seattle ==
=== Seattle crime family ===
- Frank Colacurcio - boss (1950s-2000s)

== St. Louis ==
=== St. Louis crime family ===
- Anthony Giordano – boss (1960–1980)
- Giovanni Vitale Jr. – acting boss (1975–1980)
- Matthew Trupiano – boss (1982–1997)

== Kansas City ==
=== Kansas City crime family ===
- Charles Binaggio – boss
- Nicholas Civella – boss
- Carl Civella – boss
- Peter Simone – underboss
- William Cammisano – boss
- Anthony Civella – boss

== New Orleans ==
=== New Orleans crime family ===
- Sylvestro "Silver Dollar Sam" Carolla
- Frank Todaro
- Carlos Marcello

== Tampa ==
=== Trafficante crime family ===
Boss

- Ignazio Antinori – (boss 1920–1940)
- Santo Trafficante Sr. – (boss 1940–1954)
- Santo Trafficante Jr. – (boss 1954–1987)
- Vincent LoScalzo – (boss 1987–present)

Associate

- Frank Ragano

== See also ==
- List of Italian American mobsters
- List of Mafia crime families
- List of American mobsters by organization
- List of criminal enterprises, gangs and syndicates
