= Frank Cali =

American mobster (1965–2019)

- Cali's 2008 mugshot
- Born: Francesco Paolo Augusto Cali; March 26, 1965; New York City, U.S.
- Died: March 13, 2019 (aged 53); Staten Island, New York, U.S.
- Cause of death: Gunshot wounds
- Resting place: Moravian Cemetery, New Dorp, Staten Island, U.S.
- Other name: Franky Boy
- Occupation: Crime boss
- Spouse: Rosaria Inzerillo
- Relatives: John Gambino (uncle-in-law)
- Allegiance: Gambino crime family
- Convictions: Racketeering, extortion, conspiracy (2008)
- Penalty: 10 months' imprisonment

Francesco Paolo Augusto "Frank" Cali (Note: Also spelled Calì.) (/ˈkɑːli/, Italian: [franˈtʃesko ˈpaːolo auˈɡusto kaˈli]; March 26, 1965 – March 13, 2019), also known as "Franky Boy", was an American mobster and the acting boss of the Gambino crime family of New York City at the time of his death. Law enforcement considered Cali to have been the Gambinos' "ambassador to Sicilian mobsters" and had linked him to the Inzerillo Mafia family from Palermo. According to Assistant U.S. Attorney Joseph Lipton, he was "seen as a man of influence and power by organized crime members in Italy." Cali was shot and killed outside his home in Staten Island on March 13, 2019, in connection with the killer's belief in the QAnon conspiracy theory.

== Early years ==
Cali was born on March 26, 1965, in New York City, to Augusto Cesare Calì and Agata Scimeca, both natives of Palermo, Sicily. His father ran a household goods store in Palermo and a video store in Bensonhurst, Brooklyn. He had no police record in the United States, even though he was mentioned in the Pizza Connection investigation, when police discovered that he was a partner of Domenico Adamita, allied to Sicilian Mafia boss Gaetano Badalamenti.

Frank Cali was the nephew-in-law of Sicilian mobster John Gambino, and had close ties to the once powerful Sicilian Mafia family led by Salvatore Inzerillo. Cali was also a great-nephew of Bonanno crime family mobsters Giovanni Bonventre and Vito Bonventre.

As a young man, Cali bonded with Gambino mobster Jackie D'Amico, a lieutenant of Gambino boss John Gotti who operated a crew on 18th Avenue in Brooklyn. In January 1997, the FBI reported to Italian authorities that Cali had been "combined" into the Gambino family. Cali was promoted to acting capo when D'Amico became acting boss. Cali ran several import-export companies in Brooklyn, including Circus Fruits Wholesale in Fort Hamilton, Brooklyn.

== Sicilian Mafia ties ==
Cali also maintained ties with the Sicilian Mafia. He married Rosaria Inzerillo, a sister of Pietro Inzerillo and a relative of Gambino associate Frank Inzerillo, a member of the Palermitan Inzerillo family.

In the early 1980s, after losing the Second Mafia War against the Corleonesi of Totò Riina, the Inzerillo family was forced to flee Sicily. Cali and old Palermo boss Filippo Casamento supported the return of the Inzerillos to Palermo, according to Italian authorities.

According to the Italian Polizia di Stato (State Police), Cali was also a member of the Sicilian Cosa Nostra. He was the contact for Sicilian mafiosi who traveled to New York to meet him, do business, and update him on Sicilian affairs. "He's our friend and he is everything over there", confided Sicilian mobster Gianni Nicchi to his boss Antonio Rotolo, after a trip in 2003. Nicchi is known to be one of Cali's "men of honor" who went back and forth between Palermo and the US for drug trafficking. Nicchi finally settled in Daytona Beach, Florida, where he was known to employ high school students as drug runners.

== Arrest and prison ==
In early 2003, Cali and fellow captain Leonard "Lenny" DiMaria began extorting "mob taxes" from Joseph Vollaro, the owner of a trucking and contracting company that was involved in building a NASCAR speedway on Staten Island. Vollaro was eventually forced to pay tens of thousands of dollars as tribute to D'Amico and Gambino boss Nicholas Corozzo. In 2004, to avoid prison time for a cocaine conviction, Vollaro began working with federal authorities as an informant. Vollaro's undercover work led to a massive indictment four years later.

On February 8, 2008, Cali and 61 other New York Cosa Nostra associates were arrested and charged with federal racketeering charges as part of Operation Old Bridge. Old Bridge terminated the drug trafficking between the Sicilian Mafia and the Gambino family. Prosecutors claimed that Cali acted as the Gambino "ambassador to the Sicilian mobsters" and as a liaison between D'Amico and the Sicilian connections to the Inzerillo family. Cali was charged with racketeering, extortion, and conspiracy along with D'Amico and DiMaria.

On June 4, 2008, Cali pleaded guilty to conspiring to extort money from Vollaro. Cali was incarcerated at the Metropolitan Detention Center in Brooklyn, New York. Ten months later, on April 6, 2009, he was released from prison.

Around 2009, Cali's uncle John Gambino was elevated to the family's ruling panel, according to court papers filed in Brooklyn Federal Court. The U.S. Justice Department demanded that Cali avoid all contact with Gambino, except for weddings or holiday celebrations approved in advance by Cali's probation officer.

== Underboss ==
In October 2012, Cali was identified by New York crime reporter Jerry Capeci as the new underboss of the Gambino crime family. Brooklyn Federal prosecutors had also referred to him as underboss. Capeci has previously identified Domenico Cefalù, a member of the same Sicilian faction as Cali, as the current boss of the group. Though his status remained unclear, the promotion of both men follows a period in which John Gambino was a street boss within the family, showing that the Sicilian group has remained dominant in recent years. In July 2013, it was reported that Cali turned down the position of boss of the family.

== Acting boss ==
In August 2015, New York Daily News reported Cali had taken over as acting boss of the Gambino family. A September 29, 2018, report stated that Cali "infused the family with "zips" – hoodlums from the old country – and bulked up its heroin and OxyContin business". A gangster in Italy was quoted as having stated that Cali "is everything over there" (New York). In March 2019, police investigating Cali's death publicly claimed that he had been "the acting boss" of the Gambino organized crime family.

== Death ==
Cali died at Staten Island University Hospital on March 13, 2019, at the age of 53, after being shot at about 9:20 p.m. in front of his home on Hilltop Terrace in the Todt Hill area. He was buried six days later at Moravian Cemetery in New Dorp, Staten Island. This was the first murder of a New York crime boss since the 1985 assassination of Paul Castellano, who was also boss of the Gambino family. Surveillance video showed a pickup truck striking Cali's parked Cadillac, a subsequent confrontation between the driver and Cali, and then the shooting. Cali had tried to evade the killer by using his vehicle as a shield. He was hit ten times with bullets from a 9 mm handgun.

On March 16, 24-year-old suspect Anthony Comello was arrested in Brick, New Jersey, by the New York Police Department and US Marshals, to face murder charges on Staten Island. Authorities originally believed the crime may have been related to a personal dispute (possibly a romantic matter) and not organized crime activity. On April 3, Comello was indicted and was held in protective custody at an undisclosed New York City correctional facility. On May 10, Comello pleaded not guilty to murder and weapon possession charges, although he had initially confessed to the murder to police. One news report cited unnamed mob experts as stating that he "is almost certainly marked for death". Comello had already texted that his "family is marked".

The reason why Cali was targeted is unclear. Comello gave varying, contradictory reasons to investigators as to the motive behind the killing. In July 2019, Comello's defense attorney stated that Comello had become obsessed with QAnon conspiracy theories, believing Cali was a member of a "deep state". Comello was convinced "he was enjoying the protection of President Trump himself" to handcuff Cali and place him under citizen's arrest, as Comello had attempted months earlier with New York City Mayor Bill de Blasio as well as California Member of Congress Maxine Waters.

The New York Times reported that at his first court appearance, Comello "displayed symbols and phrases associated with QAnon scrawled on his hand in pen". The defense attorney sought to prove Comello "not guilty by reason of mental defect". In December 2019, Comello refused to take a psychiatric exam and was warned by the judge that his refusal could jeopardize his right to use an insanity defense; the judge also denied a motion to suppress Comello's initial confession. In June 2020, Comello was found mentally unfit to stand trial.

In January 2025, it was revealed that Comello had pleaded guilty to manslaughter in the case and was sentenced to an undisclosed prison sentence, at an undisclosed correctional facility, when Supreme Court Justice Alexander Jeong released limited information on the proceedings at the request of the Staten Island Advance news outlet. The case otherwise remains sealed due to "actual and implied" threats from members of organized crime against Comello and his family.

== Notes ==
American Mafia
Preceded by Arnold Squitieri	Gambino crime family Underboss; 2012–2015	Unknown
Preceded by Domenico Cefalù	Gambino crime family Acting Boss; 2015–2019	Succeeded by Lorenzo Mannino
