= Inzerillo =

Inzerillo (Italian pronunciation: [indzeˈrillo]) is an Italian surname. Notable people with the surname include:

- Salvatore Inzerillo (1944–1981), Italian mobster
- Giovanni Inzerillo (born 1972), American mobster
- Jérôme Inzerillo (born 1990), French tennis player
