= Operation Old Bridge =

Arrests that targeted the Gambino crime family

Operation Old Bridge is the code name for the February 7, 2008 arrests in Italy and the United States that targeted the Gambino crime family and the Inzerillo Mafia clan; among the indicted were the reputed acting bosses Jackie D'Amico, Nicholas Corozzo and Joseph Corozzo. The indictments included murder, drug trafficking, robbery, and extortion. It is considered to be the largest transantlantic strike against the Cosa Nostra in almost 25 years, comparable that of the Pizza Connection Trial.

== Operation ==
The Federal Bureau of Investigation (FBI) was able to collect the needed information through informant Joseph Vollaro, (owner of a truck company on Staten Island) who secretly recorded several conversations with members of the Gambino family. More than 80 people were indicted in the Eastern District of New York as well as Sicily.

The heirs of both clans were arrested and 54 members were captured in Brooklyn while 29 others were arrested in the districts of Palermo. All members in America were charged with murder, racketeering, extortion, loan-sharking and labor violations, while in Palermo they were charged with illegal trafficking. The Italian arrests are tied with Salvatore Lo Piccolo, who took over as the head of the Cosa Nostra but had been arrested in November 2007.

Gambino crime family boss Nicholas Corozzo turned fugitive after he was tipped off by his daughter who witnessed her husband and fellow mobster being led away by the US authorities. On May 29, 2008, Corozzo finally couldn't take life on the run anymore and so he turned himself in to authorities with his lawyer by his side. Of the 62 American defendants, 60 pleaded guilty with at least 52 of them facing no more than three years in prison.

The operation broke up a growing alliance between the Gambinos and the Sicilian Mafia, who wanted to get further into the drug trade. One of those arrested in the raids in the US was Frank Cali, a captain in the Gambino family. He was allegedly the "ambassador" in the US for the Inzerillo crime family.

The name of the police operation, "Old Bridge", refers to the historical ties of an exile group of the Sicilian Mafiosi across the Atlantic Ocean. After the Second Mafia War in the beginning of the 1980s the surviving members of the Inzerillo mafia family had been "allowed" to migrate to New York to avoid extermination by the Corleonesi clan and then victorious Sicilian boss of bosses Salvatore Riina. The Inzerillo's American relatives and associates of New York's Gambino family intervened on their behalf. They were allowed to settle in the States in exchange for a pledge: neither they nor their offspring would ever again set foot on Sicilian soil. They became known as gli Scappati, the Runaways. Two decades later, the Runaways were returning to Palermo. The exiles had good reasons: Riina and his successor Bernardo Provenzano were both arrested and are serving life terms in Italy. The runaway Inzerillo clan was allegedly rebuilding the "Old Bridge" between America and Sicily, reestablishing the business and drug trafficking ties between the Sicilian and American mobs.

== Convictions ==
The following list contains some of the most notable charged and does not include most of those convicted.

Name
Name	Charge	Verdict	Sentence	Release date
Thomas Cacciopoli	Extortion			April 4, 2011
Frank Cali	Racketeering, extortion, and conspiracy	Pleaded guilty to conspiracy charges	16 months	June 4, 2009
Charles Carneglia	Murder	Guilty by jury of four murders	Life imprisonment	N/A
Domenico Cefalu	Racketeering	Pleaded guilty to extortion	Two years	November 3, 2009
Joseph Corozzo	Racketeering, drug trafficking	Pleaded guilty to a racketeering conspiracy charge	46 months	June 10, 2011
Nicholas Corozzo	Enterprise corruption and murder	Pleaded guilty to enterprise corruption charge and was found guilty by jury of murder	13½ years	March 2, 2020
Jackie D'Amico	Racketeering	Pleaded guilty to extortion	Two years	November 3, 2009
Leonard DiMaria		Pleaded guilty to racketeering, extortion, and conspiracy		August 31, 2012
Richard G. Gotti	Attempted murder	Pleaded guilty	Eight years	February 22, 2015
Vincent Gotti	Attempted murder	Pleaded guilty	Eight years	February 22, 2015
Richard Ranieri	Extortion			March 1, 2010
Vincent Dragonetti	Extortion		37 months	May 28, 2011

== Other indicted Mafiosi ==
=== American Mafiosi indicted ===
Those without a release date listed either weren't sentenced to jail time or weren't imprisoned in a Federal Bureau of Prisons.

- Joseph Agate
- Vincent "Elmo" Amarante
- Jerome "Jerry" Brancato (released September 3, 2010)
- Nicholas Calvo (released January 12, 2010)
- Joseph "Joe Rackets" Casiere
- Mario "Lanza" Cassarino (released September 15, 2010)
- John Cavallo
- Gino Cracolici
- Sarah Dauria
- Vincent "Vinny Hot" Decongilio (released January 22, 2010)
- Salvatore DeGrazia
- Vincent Donnis
- Robert Francis "Bobby the Jew" Epifania (released June 6, 2010)
- Cody Farrell
- Louis Faustino
- Russell "One Eye" Ferrisi (released December 5, 2008)
- Louis Filippelli (released December 9, 2008)
- Ronald Flam
- Joseph "Joe Gag" Gaggi
- Abid "Han" Ghani (released February 14, 2008)
- Anthony "Buckwheat" Giammarino
- Ernest "Ernie" Grillo (released April 13, 2010)
- Christopher Howard
- Steven Francis "Stevie I" Iaria (released March 31, 2009)
- Eddie James
- John Kasgorgis (released April 4, 2008)
- William Kilgannon
- Michael King
- Anthony Licata (released February 1, 2011)
- Joseph Marsilio
- De facto Morganelli
- Anthony O'Donnell
- James Outerie (released June 25, 2010)
- Vincent "Vinny Basile" Pacelli (released May 5, 2010)
- John "Johnny Red Rose" Pisano (released September 30, 2008)
- Todd Polakoff
- Giulio "Gino" Pomponio
- John "Reeg" Regis (released October 3, 2008)
- Jerry Romano
- Angelo "Little Ang" Ruggiero, Jr. (release date: May 2, 2013)
- Steven Sabella
- Jimmy Scalzo
- Anthony John Scibelli (released January 26, 2011)
- Augustus "Gus" Sclafani
- Joseph Scopo (released July 27, 2010)
- William "Billy" Scotto
- Edward "Eddie" Sobol
- Joseph Spinnato (released January 30, 2009)
- Michael "Mike the Electrician" Urciuoli (released June 24, 2008)
- Frank "Frankie" Vassallo
- Tara "Big Tara" Vega
- Arthur Zagari

=== Sicilian mafiosi indicted ===
- Francesco Adelfio (66)
- Salvatore Adelfio (42)
- Giuseppe Brunettini (37)
- Filippo Casamento (82) (Bocadifalco clan member, Bonanno family associate, former Catalano-Ganci Consortium member and Pizza Connection defendant) (released May 7, 2010)
- Antonino Chiappara (42)
- Sergio Corallo (42)
- Giovanni De Simone (46)
- Maurizio Di Fede (40)
- Salvatore Emanuele Di Maggio (59) (Torretta clan member)
- Nicola Di Salvo (70)
- Melchiorre Guglielmini (49)
- Giovanni Inzerillo (36) (son of Salvatore Inzerillo)
- Tommaso Lo Presti (33)
- Giovanni Lo Verde (69)
- Stefano Marino (36)
- Gianni Nicchi (27) (Pagliarelli capo-mafia, successor to Rotolo, Sicilian emissary to New York)
- Pietro Pipitone (54)
- Gaetano Savoca (41) (Brancaccio)
- Vincenzo Savoca (77) (Brancaccio)

=== Sicilian mafiosi already in prison who were indicted ===
- Andrea Adamo (46) (Brancaccio capo-mafia, ally of Salvatore Lo Piccolo)
- Calogero Di Gioia (60)
- Lorenzo Di Fede (83)
- Benedetto Graviano (50)
- Tommaso Inzerillo (59)
- Cesare Carmelo Lupo (47)
- Antonio Rotolo (62) (Pagliarelli capo-mafia, Palermo Federation leader, rival of Salvatore Lo Piccolo)
- Giuseppe "Pino" Savoca (74) (Brancaccio capo-mafia)
- Salvatore Sorrentino (43)

=== Sicilian mafiosi on the run ===
- Salvatore Parisi (54)

=== Sicilian mafiosi indicted who turned pentito ===
- Giovanni Adelfio (70) (Villagrazia clan member)
