= Corozzo =

Corozzo is a surname. Notable people with the surname include:

- Joseph Corozzo (1942–2024), American mobster
- Nicholas Corozzo (born 1940), American mobster, brother of Joseph
