= Alphonse Malangone =

American mobster

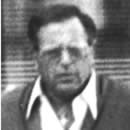
Federal Bureau of Investigation surveillance photograph of Alphonse Malangone

Alphonse Malangone (born December 2, 1936), legal name "Alfonso" and known as "Allie Shades," is a New York City-based mobster and former caporegime in the Genovese crime family. Malangone controlled the Genovese interests in the Fulton Fish Market, as well as being involved in pump and dump stock scams on Wall Street, and controlling Brooklyn's garbage hauling industry. He was a central figure in the book "Takedown: The Fall of the Last Mafia Empire" (ISBN 0-425-19299-7) an autobiography by NYPD officer Rick Cowan who went undercover for several years in the commercial garbage industry, posing as a family member of Brooklyn garbage company and eventually gaining access to the garbage cartel's organization, the Kings County Trade Waste Association. Cowen describes Malangone as the cagiest and most relatable of mobsters he dealt with. Malangone was often with his longtime and most trusted soldier/driver Rocky Cimato. Rocky was popular amongst the organization always trusted and admired for his loyalty.

He got his nickname for always wearing aviator style tinted sunglasses, even at night.

== Early days ==
Allie Malangone was born and grew up in Brooklyn, New York. He was inducted into the Genovese crime family in the mid-to-late 1970s. He worked under Thomas Contaldo and Gaetano Marino. He was also an associate of Vincent Romano and Carmine Romano, who worked with Joseph Lanza to control the Fulton Fish Market in downtown Manhattan. Malangone went to work in the Fish Market and soon he began accepting payoffs from vendors and trucking companies, and continued to run his own fish company with his son, Alphonse Malangone Jr. and Frank Malangone.

=== Promotion ===
As he rose through the ranks of the Genovese crime family, Malangone became one of the family's biggest earners and most respected members, and began to associate with men from all Five Families. Malangone was a close friend of Bonanno crime family consigliere and onetime acting boss, Anthony Spero. Despite tension between New York's two most powerful crime families, the Genoveses and Gambinos, Malangone was known to be close to the Gambino boss John Gotti and frequently visited with Gotti at his Ravenite Social Club on Mulberry Street.

By the mid-to-late 1980s Malangone controlled a significant portion of the Genovese crime family's interests in the Fulton Fish Market. In 1989, family boss Chin Gigante promoted Malagone, and he worked with Alan Longo, Elio Albanese, Stanly Coehen, Gerardo Guadagno and Carmine Russo.

Malagone was described as the "manager" of the Pastels Disco of Bay Ridge, Brooklyn.

=== Garbage hauling industry ===
The New York Mafia has controlled the city's garbage hauling industry since the 1940s from the days of Albert Anastasia crime family, operated by Albert Anastasia and James Squillante. In 1957 Anastasia was murdered and in 1960 Squillante disappeared, but the Gambino crime family continued to control their portion of the city's garbage rackets through their control of the Association of Trade Waste Removers of Greater New York, overseen by James Failla. Through their co-operation and the creation of various garbage hauling cartels, the Genovese and Gambino crime families wielded near absolute power within New York City's garbage hauling industry.

By the 1990s Malangone was one of the Genovese crime family's most important and powerful members. He was involved in law enforcement surveillance, and frequently met with Michele Generoso. Malangone was overseer of the crime family's private sanitation rackets through his control of the Bensonhurst, Brooklyn based Kings County Trade Waste Association and the Greater New York Waste Paper Association. Frank Giovinco also worked at the Greater New York Waste paper Association as the Genovese crime family's on-site authority.

=== Indictment and prison ===
On June 22, 1995, Allie Malangone was indicted on charges of controlling New York City's private waste industry through his close associate Frank Giovinco, and transferring huge amounts of money at Pontecagnano Salerno. The indictment resulted from an undercover operation that targeted Malangone and others involved in the New York Mafia controlled carting cartels, including Angelo Ponte, who headed one of the city's largest and most successful carting firms, "V. Ponte & Sons". The law enforcement operation also snared Genovese associates Frank Giovinco, Frank Allocca and Philip Barretti, one of New York City's wealthiest garbage executives. The investigation and subsequent indictments also targeted former garbage czar James Failla and his successor Joseph Francolino.

Malangone chose to go to trial and on October 21, 1997, he was convicted and eventually sentenced to 15 years in prison. He spent his time quietly as a timid elder inmate with minor health issues his reputation as a mobster from books and spending time eating and playing cards easily connected with a son of Vojislav Stanimirovic NY Crime Lord, also doing time, according to a new Mafia Tell All Book about (Mobsters in Prison) & in book (Stealing Manhattan) by author Burl Barer, and Punch stated the best (knock gin) card player. He was a very good card player "Shades" and couldn't be beat. "Shades* was released to parole intensive supervision on April 2010.

== See also ==
- Rosario Gangi
