= Valbella (restaurant) =

- Interactive map of Valbella

Restaurant information
- Established: 1991
- Owner: David Ghatan (also known as David Ghatanfard)
- Manager: Nick Zherka
- Food type: Italian
- Location: 1309 East Putnam Avenue, Riverside, Fairfield, Connecticut, 06878, United States
- Coordinates: 41°2′35″N 73°34′32″W
- Reservations: required for parties of six and more
- Website: www.valbellagreenwich.com

Valbella is an Italian restaurant in the Riverside section of Greenwich, Connecticut with sister locations in Midtown Manhattan and the Meatpacking District, Manhattan. Regulars included Joe Torre, "almost the entire Yankees team" and Regis Philbin, who was a Saturday night regular for 22 years; his regular table was left empty in his honor after his death.

Wine Spectator awarded them with a Best of Award of Excellence.

On December 20, 2009, there was a fire that caused them to close for a month for repairs.

== Mafia ==
In 1998, the restaurant was invaded by members of the Gambino crime family to get them to pay protection money ($5,000/month) and free food. Underboss Anthony "The Genius" Megale, acting boss Arnold Squitieri and 30 others were brought up on federal charges of extortion in 2005.

Megale, considered Connecticut’s highest ranking Mob member, was sentenced to eleven years for this and other crimes.

Joaquín "Jack" García, a retired FBI agent, mentioned Valbella in his book Making Jack Falcone: Am Undercover FBI Agent Takes Down a Mafia Family.,

García had Caporegime Greg DePalma on tape saying he dined at Valbella for free and controlled the restaurant.
