= Inzerillo Mafia clan =

Sicilian Mafia clan

- Founded: 1960s
- Founded by: Salvatore Inzerillo
- Founding location: Palermo, Sicily
- Years active: 1960s-present
- Territory: Passo di Rigano neighborhood in Palermo.
- Ethnicity: Sicilians
- Criminal activities: Drug trafficking and money laundering
- Allies: Santa Maria di Gesù Mafia family Greco Mafia clan Gambino crime family Catania Mafia family
- Rivals: Corleonesi

The Inzerillo Mafia clan (Italian pronunciation: [indzeˈrillo]) is a Sicilian Mafia clan that was once among the most powerful in Sicily and was regarded as part of the "aristocracy" of Palermo’s Mafia since the 1960s.

The Inzerillo family was associated with the former American Mafia boss Carlo Gambino and his family. In the modern era, the Inzerillo clan had been associated with John Gambino through heroin trafficking, and also has links to the deceased former Gambino family boss, Frank Cali.

== History ==
The family rose to prominence when its most notorious member, Salvatore "Totuccio" Inzerillo, became the head of the Passo di Rigano mafia family in the 1960s. The Inzerillos were historical allies of Stefano Bontade, and were organizers of large trafficking of morphine from the Far East.

The Inzerillos were overwhelmed in the Mafia war that exploded between 1981 and 1983 in the streets of Palermo. Salvatore died machine-gunned by a Kalashnikov on 11 May 1981 in Palermo. After that, the Corleonesi under Salvatore Riina killed his brothers Santo (who died in Palermo) and Pietro (found dead in New Jersey in the trunk of a car with $5 in his mouth and two dollars on his genitals), an uncle and the eldest son, Giuseppe.

Related to the Spatola, Mannino, Castellano, Gambino, and Di Maggio families, they first landed in the US in 1956, settling in Cherry Hill. Their protector in the US was the boss Carlo Gambino, Inzerillo's cousin.

The whole family fled to the United States except Filippa Spatola, Inzerillo's wife, and son Giovanni. Subsequently, the Sicilian Mafia Commission, under pressure from the American Cosa Nostra, decided to grant a pardon to the rest of the Inzerillo family on the condition that none of them nor their descendants would ever return to Sicily. Gone for nearly 20 years, in early 2000 the Inzerillos were back in Palermo, and in the summer of 2007, murders in Palermo seemed to herald a new Mafia war. The first of the family to reappear was Franco, who had been deported from the United States.

Giovanni Inzerillo, Salvatore's son, was later indicted and arrested on 7 February 2008, in Operation Old Bridge against the Gambinos in New York and their connections in Palermo, involved in drug trafficking. Currently, the head of the family is Giovanni Inzerillo. Other active members in Sicily affiliated with the family, according to a police investigation, were Giovanni Bosco, a relative of Salvatore Inzerillo; Alfonso Gambino, a trusted man and spokesperson for Bosco in negotiations with other mandamenti; Ignazio Mannino, of the Torretta Mafia family; and Matteo Inzerillo, nephew of the boss Michelangelo La Barbera, in charge of maintaining relations with other members of the mandamento.
