= Vollaro =

Vollaro is an Italian surname. Notable people with the surname include:

- Joseph Vollaro (born 1966), American mobster
- Luigi Vollaro (1932–2015), Italian mafia boss
