= Valbella =

Valbella may refer to:

- Valbella (restaurant), an Italian restaurant in Greenwich, Connecticut, United States
- Valbella, Vaz/Obervaz, a village in Graubünden, Switzerland
- 13th Motorized Infantry Battalion "Valbella", Italian Army unit that succeeded the first iteration of the 13th Infantry Regiment "Pinerolo"
