= William T. Davis Wildlife Refuge =

Protected area in New York, United States

Coordinates: 40°35′42″N 74°10′28″W

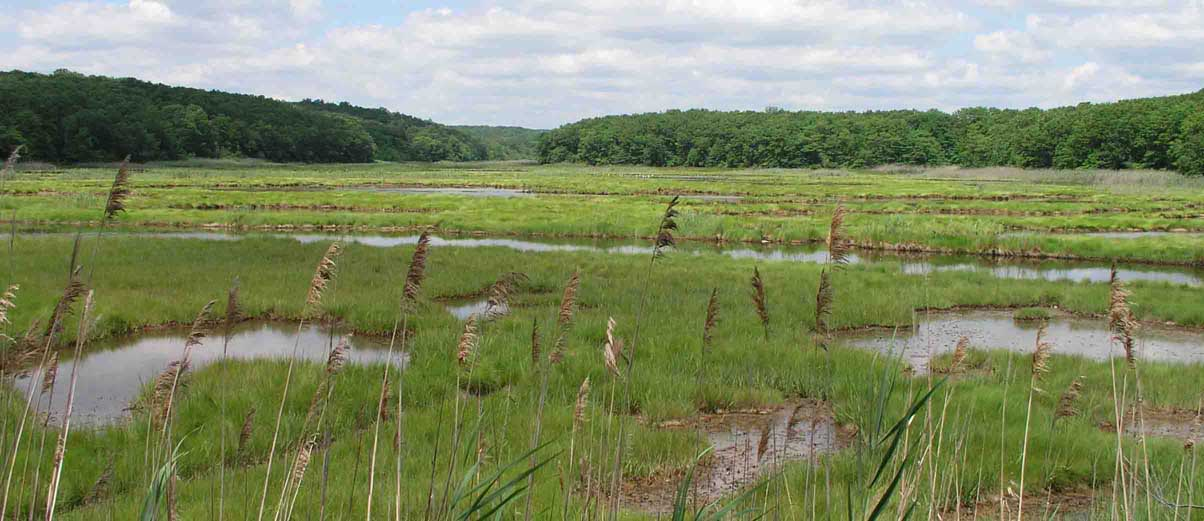
A northeastern salt marsh similar to the WTDWR, Spartina alterniflora growing along creeks, Phragmites australis visible in foreground.

The William T. Davis Wildlife Refuge (WTDWR) is an 814-acre (3.29 km^{2}) wildlife refuge straddling the New Springville and Travis sections of Staten Island. The park was named in honor of Staten Island native William T. Davis, a renowned naturalist and entomologist who along with the Audubon Society started the refuge with an original acquisition of 52 acres (210,000 m^{2}). Additional acreage was acquired in increments and the park is today 814 acres (3.29 km^{2}). Beginning in 2010, the adjacent 223-acre (0.90 km^{2}) North Park section of Freshkills Park (the redevelopment of the Fresh Kills Landfill) has undergone preparation to serve as an expansion of the wildlife refuge.

This refuge is the sixth largest park in New York City out of a total of 1,700 parks; it is only 30 acres (120,000 m^{2}) smaller than Central Park.

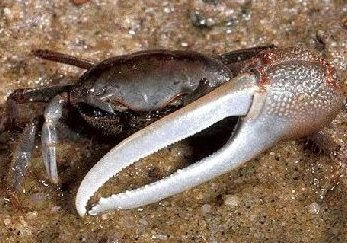
Fiddler crabs are found in the refuge's salt marshes

The refuge is at the confluence of Main and Springville Creeks, two tributaries of Freshkill Creek, a tidal creek which is connected to the Arthur Kill.

Within the refuge there are expansive salt marshes with low marsh bordering the creeks and flooding twice daily with the high tide and a more expansive area of high marsh which floods occasionally during exceptionally high tide. In the low marsh, saltmarsh cordgrass (Spartina alterniflora) is the dominant species while saltmeadow cordgrass (Spartina patens) is found in the high marsh. There are degraded areas of the marsh in which the common reed (Phragmites australis), an invasive species, has supplanted the native cordgrass; this generally occurs in the high marsh zone where the soil is saturated but infrequently inundated.

In addition to the salt marshes there are forested uplands and a swamp forest and small spring-fed ponds.

- Marine life: The marine life present in the refuge includes the fiddler crab (Uca pugnax), ribbed mussel (Geukensia demissa), clam and oyster.

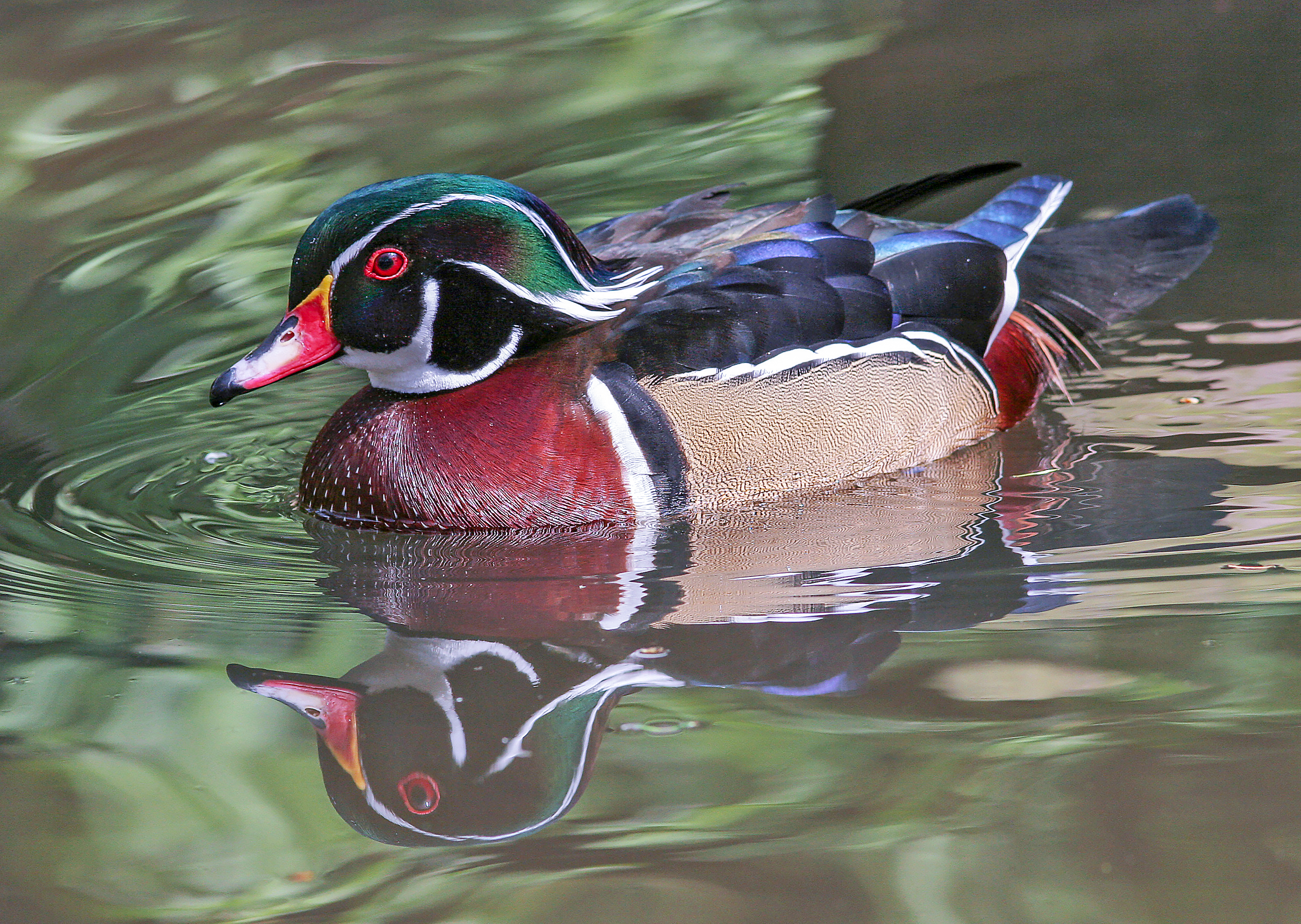
Wood duck (Aix sponsa)

- Bird species: Over 117 bird species have been recorded at the William T. Davis Wildlife Refuge, including Saltmarsh Sparrows (Ammospiza caudacutus), and wood duck (Aix sponsa). Among the species of raptors which frequent the park are red-tailed hawks (Buteo jamaicensis) red-shouldered (Buteo lineatus), and rough-legged (Buteo lagopus) hawks and osprey. There are also various species of owl such as American barn owl (Tyto furcata), great horned owl (Bubo virginianus), and short-eared owl (Asio flammeus). The Great blue heron hunts fish along the tidal marshes.
- Mammals: Muskrats (Ondatra zibethica) live along the marshes; there are also raccoons, eastern grey squirrel, chipmunk, and a few species of field mouse.

In addition to the invasive common reed, some sections of the refuge especially along Travis Ave. are overrun by Japanese knotweed.

The fresh-water New Springville Creek, which originates in the Greenbelt, flows into the park. The creek is subterranean for most of its length, having been enclosed in pipe.

In the east of the refuge was the burial site for six people murdered and dismembered by the Bonanno crime family associate Thomas "Tommy Karate" Pitera, who was sentenced to life in prison in 1992.

== Geology ==
The Palisades Sill extending from upstate New York along the Hudson River in New Jersey, is exposed until Jersey City, New Jersey. The formation then becomes entirely subterranean until it reaches the refuge where a small section breaks the surface in a swamp off Travis Ave.
