= St. Charles / Resurrection Cemeteries =

Catholic cemetery in East Farmingdale, New York, US

Coordinates: 40°44′04″N 73°24′27″W

St. Charles / Resurrection Cemeteries is a Catholic cemetery of the Diocese of Brooklyn in East Farmingdale, New York.

== History ==
It was formed from two separate but adjoining cemeteries, the Archdiocese of New York's Resurrection Cemetery and the Diocese of Brooklyn's St. Charles Cemetery. Both were purchased by their respective dioceses in 1914 from the Pinelawn Cemetery Corporation, and the first burials in St. Charles took place in 1937 as St. John Cemetery in Queens began to fill. In 1953, Resurrection Cemetery was sold to the Diocese of Brooklyn and they were combined into a single cemetery.

== Notable burials ==
Among those interred here are:

- Cesare Bonventre, mobster
- Peter J. Brennan, United States Secretary of Labor
- Walt Brown, Racecar driver
- "Jimmy the Gent" Burke, mobster
- Mary Ann Ganser, singer with The Shangri-Las
- Gil Clancy, boxing coach and commentator
- DeFeo Family murder victims, died in a 1974 killing, whose story inspired The Amityville Horror
- William M. Feehan, FDNY Deputy Commissioner
- Vincent Gardenia, actor
- Vitas Gerulaitis, pro tennis player
- Glenn Hughes, singer
- Joseph Magliocco, mobster
- Frank McGlynn, actor
- Maggie McNamara, actress
- Johnny Roventini, dwarf actor
- Ray Sharkey, actor
- Peter Steele, musician
- Daniel Suhr, American firefighter, victim of the September 11 attacks
- Carol Ann Susi, actress
- Eva Taylor, singer, actress
- Anthony Trentacosta, mobster
- Frank Buckley Walker, talent agent
- Clarence Williams, composer, musician
- Clarence Williams III, actor (grandson of Clarence Williams)

== See also ==
- List of cemeteries in the United States
