= Cemetery of the Resurrection =

Cemetery in Staten Island, New York City

Coordinates: 40°30′51″N 74°12′33″W

The Cemetery of the Resurrection is a Roman Catholic cemetery on the southern shore of Staten Island, in New York City. It is owned and operated by the Archdiocese of New York.

== Notable burials ==
- Joseph Armone (1917–1992), organized crime figure
- William Cutolo, Sr. (1949–1999), underboss of the Colombo crime family
- Dorothy Day (1897–1980), Catholic social activist recognized as a Servant of God
- Michael Ollis (1988–2013), American soldier, United States Army Medal of Honor recipient
- Costabile Farace (1960–1989), American criminal, mobster
- Angela "Big Ang" Raiola (1960–2016), main cast member on the VH1 reality television series, Mob Wives
- Anthony Spero (1929–2008), consigliere of the Bonanno crime family
