= Frank LoCascio =

American mobster (1932–2021)

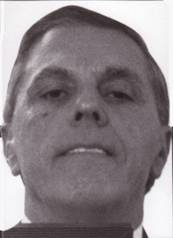
- LoCascio in 1990
- Born: September 24, 1932; New York City, New York, U.S.
- Died: October 1, 2021 (aged 89); Devens, Massachusetts, U.S.
- Other names: “Frankie Lo” “Frankie Loc”
- Occupation: Mobster
- Children: Salvatore LoCascio and Lisa LoCascio
- Status: Deceased
- Allegiance: Gambino crime family
- Convictions: Conspiracy to commit murder, racketeering
- Penalty: Life imprisonment without parole (1992)

Frank LoCascio (September 24, 1932 – October 1, 2021) was an American mobster who rose to become consigliere of the Gambino crime family under the administration of John Gotti.

== Biography ==
LoCascio was born to Italian immigrants from Baucina, Sicily.

Becoming a made man during the 1950s, LoCascio was a bookmaker and loanshark for the Gambino family. Later on, he was promoted to caporegime of a crew in the Bronx, New York. After the December 1985 assassination of boss Paul Castellano, Gotti became the new Gambino boss and LoCascio joined his inner circle. When underboss Joseph Armone went to prison in 1987, LoCascio became acting underboss; When Gotti reshuffled his administration later on, promoting Salvatore "Sammy the Bull" Gravano to Armone's position, LoCascio became acting consigliere.

=== 1992 conviction ===
On December 11, 1990, LoCascio was arrested alongside Gotti and Gravano and indicted for racketeering. At the time of his arrest, LoCascio was still publicly identified as the Gambino family's underboss.

At this time, Gravano decided to become a government witness and testified against his former associates. On April 2, 1992, LoCascio was convicted on racketeering and conspiracy charges, as was Gotti. On June 23, 1992, both Gotti and LoCascio were sentenced to life imprisonment without the possibility of parole. When asked to comment at his sentencing, LoCascio made the following remarks:

"First, I would like to say emphatically that I am innocent... I am guilty though. I am guilty of being a good friend of John Gotti. And if there were more men like John Gotti on this earth, we would have a better country."

Gambino captain Joseph "Jo Jo" Corozzo later replaced LoCascio as consigliere.

In Underboss, the tell-all tome by Salvatore "Sammy the Bull" Gravano, describes an incident in which LoCascio, in jail with Gotti and Gravano in 1991, gave him a stolen orange before offering one to Gotti. Gotti became furious and loudly belittled LoCascio in front of other inmates. Later, Gravano said, a humiliated LoCascio tearfully vowed to murder Gotti, stating, "The minute I get out, I'm killing this [expletive]." Gravano claims he and LoCascio then made a pact to kill Gotti at a victory party, assuming they were somehow acquitted: "Frankie said, 'Sammy, two things. I'll bring him to the party myself, and I got to be the shooter.'"

According to law enforcement sources and court papers, an infuriated Gotti, who was serving a life sentence in Marion, Illinois, reached out to the Aryan Brotherhood prison gang to kill LoCascio. Sources said they believe that two members of the white supremacist group were used in 1994 by one of Gotti's associates in a murder-for-hire contract. At some point, federal prison officials in Marion allegedly caught Gotti complaining about the LoCascio passage on video cameras, a source said. Without identifying Gotti, prison officials said in court papers "a possible 'contract' has been put on LoCascio's life by his former Mafia associates."

LoCascio was placed in the comfort care program at FMC Devens on September 28, 2021, for multiple medical complications. He died in prison on October 1, 2021, at the age of 89.

In the 1996 television movie Gotti, LoCascio is portrayed by actor Raymond Serra.

In the 1998 two-part television movie Witness to the Mob, LoCascio is portrayed by actor/singer Frankie Valli.

American Mafia
Preceded by Joseph "Piney" Armone	Gambino crime family Consigliere; 1985-1992	Succeeded by Joseph "Jo Jo" Corozzo
