= Stephen Armone =

American mobster (1899–1960)

- Born: Stefano Armone; November 17, 1899; Palermo, Sicily, Italy
- Died: 1960 (aged 60–61); New York City, New York, U.S.
- Other name: "14th Street Steve"
- Occupation: Mobster
- Relatives: Joseph Armone (brother)
- Allegiance: Gambino crime family

Stephen Armone (November 17, 1899 – 1960), also known as "14th Street Steve", was an Italian-American mobster with the Gambino crime family of New York City who ran gambling operations in Lower Manhattan and was involved in the "French Connection" heroin smuggling network. He was the older brother of Gambino capo Joseph "Joe Piney" Armone.

== Criminal career ==
Armone was born in Palermo, Sicily and moved to the United States with his family in 1906, settling initially in the Queens borough of New York City. Raised at 406 East 11th Street and 336 East 13th Street on the East Village of Manhattan, he was a prominent Mafioso in the 14th Street area and was known by the nickname "14th Street Steve". A small-statured man with black-gray hair, Armone limped due to a previous hip fracture. His arrest record included assault and battery with intent to kill, burglary, and narcotics laws violations. Armone was a leader of Gambino operations on the Lower East Side. He also engaged in large-scale narcotics smuggling and distribution.

Following the end of Prohibition, Armone began distributing heroin and opium on behalf of Joseph "Joe the Blonde" Biondo, a caporegime in what would become the Gambino crime family. He was arrested by federal narcotics agents in 1938 for shipping 59 ounces of heroin to New York on an Italian ocean liner. On September 6, 1944, Armone was indicted on charges of attempting to smuggle morphine and opium into the United States from the Bahamas. Using a fleet of small boats, the smuggling ring started in 1940, but stopped in 1941 due to World War II. Due to the difficulty of obtaining heroin from overseas during wartime, Armone and Eugene Tramaglino started buying Mexican opium in California in 1942, transporting it to New York City and converting it to heroin.

In 1957, Armone allegedly participated in the assassination of family boss Albert Anastasia. Family underboss Carlo Gambino and Luciano crime family capo Vito Genovese had been plotting to assume power in their respective families. Gambino capo Joseph Biondo selected Armone to head a hit squad that included family heroin dealers Stephen Grammauta and Arnold Wittenburg. On October 25, 1957, Armone and his hit squad ambushed Anastasia at a Manhattan hotel barber shop. While Anastasia was in the chair having a shave and haircut, his bodyguards disappeared. The hit squad entered the shop and shot him to death.

Armone died in 1960, and his younger brother Joseph "Joe Piney" Armone succeeded him as overseer of the Gambino heroin operations.
