= Death of Daniel Suhr =

American firefighter, victim of the September 11 attacks

Daniel Suhr
- Born: Daniel Thomas Suhr; August 21, 1964; Brooklyn, New York City, U.S.
- Died: September 11, 2001 (aged 37); World Trade Center, New York City, U.S.
- Cause of death: Struck by civilian falling from the South Tower during the September 11 attacks
- Education: College of the Desert
- Occupation: Firefighter

On September 11, 2001, Daniel Thomas Suhr, a 37‑year‑old New York City Fire Department (FDNY) firefighter, was killed when a civilian falling from the South Tower struck him as he responded to the World Trade Center during the 9/11 attacks. His death is regarded as the first FDNY fatality of the day.

== Biography ==
Daniel Thomas Suhr was born on August 21, 1964, and grew up in Brooklyn, New York City, where he captained both the baseball and football teams at James Madison High School. In 1983, he played one season of college football as a linebacker for the College of the Desert and was named to the All‑Foothill Conference team. His father was a career firefighter, and his brother also joined the FDNY. Suhr later became a firefighter with Engine Company 216.

He and his future wife began dating while they were in grammar school, and the couple lived in Rockaway Park, Queens.

=== Death ===
Before the collapse of the World Trade Center, numerous people were seen jumping or falling from the upper floors of the burning buildings, almost all from the North Tower. Three people were observed falling from the South Tower and one of them struck Suhr as he responded to the scene, killing him instantly. His colleagues removed his body before the towers collapsed, and he was buried at St. Charles / Resurrection Cemeteries in East Farmingdale, New York. The 9/11 Commission Report noted that "(t)he first FDNY fatality of the day occurred at approximately 9:30 when a civilian landed on and killed a fireman near the intersection of West and Liberty streets."

=== Aftermath and legacy ===
The South Shore High School football team‚ which Suhr had helped to coach‚ dedicated its 2001 season to him.

He is memorialised at the National September 11 Memorial, at the South Pool on Panel S‑14.

In 2021, retired FDNY Captain Paul Conlon published Daniel Suhr: A Story of September 11th.

== Sources ==
- Final Report of the 9/11 Commission on Terrorist Attacks Upon the United States (PDF) (Report). National Commission on Terrorist Attacks Upon the United States. July 22, 2004. Archived (PDF) from the original on August 16, 2021.
- Conlon, Paul (2021). Daniel Suhr: A Story of September 11th. ISBN 978-1736884607
