= Anthony Trentacosta =

American mobster

Anthony Trentacosta (September 12, 1940 – December 25, 2005), also known as "Tony Pep", was a New York mobster and Caporegime with the Gambino crime family who headed one of their factions in South Florida.

== Moving south ==
In March 1999, after the death of caporegime Anthony "Fat Andy" Ruggiano, the Gambino family allegedly transferred Trentacosta to South Florida to lead Ruggiano's crew. Along with representatives of Leonard "Lenny" DiMaria, Trentacosta joined a crew that was conducting loansharking, extortion and bank fraud. The crew operated out of a pizzeria known as "Beachside Mario's" in Sunny Isles Beach, Florida. By 2000, Trentacosta had become the caporegime of the South Florida crew.

In 2001, Trentacosta was indicted on federal racketeering charges in Miami. In May 2002, Trentacosta pleaded guilty to lesser charges and was sentenced to eight years in prison. As part of his plea bargain, Trentacosta admitted that he belonged to the Gambino family, in what used to be a major breach of Cosa Nostra protocol.

Trentacosta died in prison in December 2005. He is entombed at Saint Charles Cemetery in Farmingdale, New York.

== See also ==
- Leonard "Lenny" DiMaria
- Gambino crime family
