= Thomas Pitera =

American mobster (born 1954)

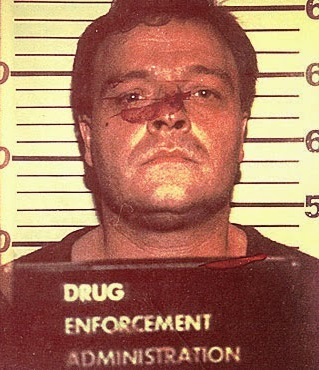
- Pitera's June 4, 1990 DEA mugshot
- Born: December 2, 1954 (age 71); New York City, U.S.
- Other names: "Tommy Karate"; "The Karate Guy"
- Occupation: Mobster
- Status: Incarcerated
- Allegiance: Bonanno crime family
- Convictions: Drug trafficking, murder (1992)
- Penalty: Life imprisonment (1992)

Details
- Imprisoned at: United States Penitentiary, Big Sandy

Thomas Pitera (/pɪˈtɛərə/; born December 2, 1954) is an American mobster in the Bonanno crime family of New York City. Pitera, a soldier and later on a captain of his own crew, was suspected by law enforcement of as many as 60 murders.

Pitera was well known for his use of karate and other martial arts when fighting, a skill he had learned at a young age and which earned him nicknames like "Tommy Karate" and "The Karate Guy". Pitera is serving a life sentence at USP Big Sandy in Inez, Kentucky.

== Early years ==
Thomas Pitera grew up in the Gravesend neighborhood of Brooklyn, New York City, the son of Joseph "Joe" Pitera, an Italian-American from Campagna independent concession stand wholesale candy salesman.

Pitera attended the David A. Boody Junior High School at 228 Avenue S in Gravesend, where he left little impression with his teachers, daydreamed a lot and was bullied by his peers because of his high-pitched voice. Before he became interested in martial arts he wanted to become involved in professional baseball but was too ostracized by fellow students to join the varsity baseball team. He later broke into Boody and stole the school baseball team's equipment as an act of revenge and sold it to "fences" in the neighborhood.

He was later arrested and charged for the burglary but was convicted as a juvenile and his record was sealed. He attended a Dojo in Sheepshead Bay, Brooklyn, and quickly rose to the top of his class. He had a daily regimen of working out, lifting weights, reading about Kyokushin fighting strategies and tactics and watching violent films, mostly kung fu films.

=== Martial arts ===
At the age of 12, Pitera had been a huge fan of the 1966 The Green Hornet television show and actor Bruce Lee starring alongside Van Williams, triggering his lifelong interest in martial arts. It was later solidified in 1969 with the release of the film Marlowe starring James Garner and Lee as "Lee Wong". He let his thick, straight, black hair grow down past his ears despite disapproval by his parents for not wanting him to look like a "hippie", started eating sushi as a regular part of his diet and immersed himself in Eastern philosophy.

After winning a kumite competition in Sheepshead Bay, Pitera spent 27 months in Tokyo training to use the tonfa, nunchucks and katanas. While in Japan, he grew his hair down to his shoulders. After his scholarship ended, he sought work in a chopsticks factory to underwrite his stay and earn more money. This led him to acquire the nickname "Tommy Karate" by friends and fellow mobsters.

== Criminal career ==
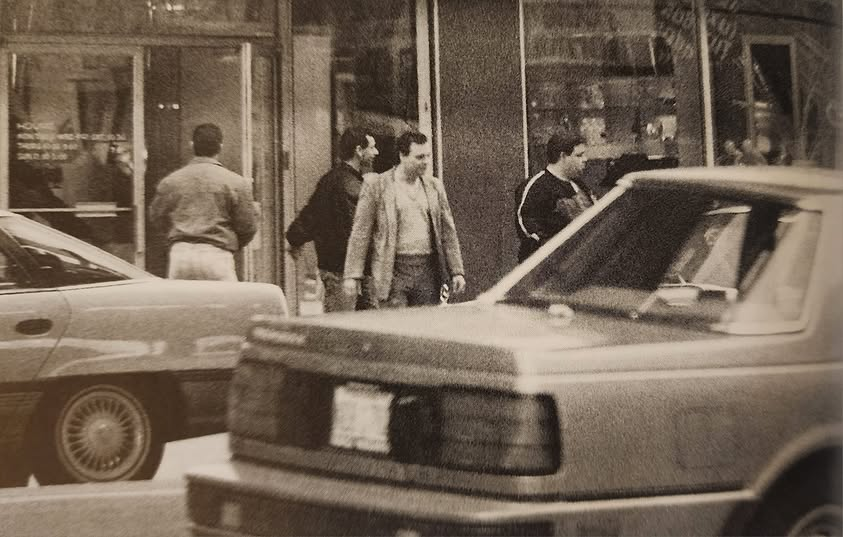
A DEA surveillance photo of Pitera (center)

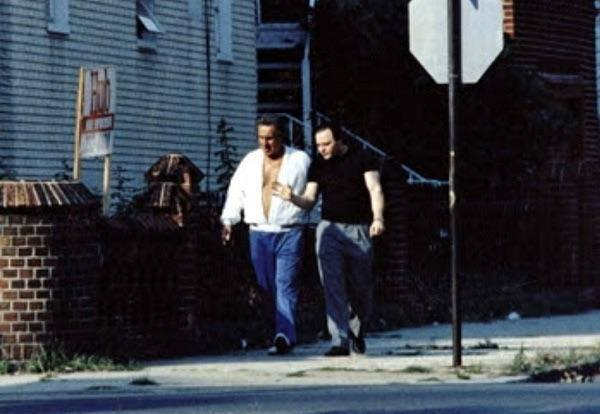
An FBI surveillance photo of Pitera (right) with Anthony Spero

Upon returning to Brooklyn, Pitera joined the Bonanno crime family and quickly became one of their most feared hitmen. He belonged to a Bonanno faction headed by caporegimes Alphonse "Sonny Red" Indelicato, Frank Lino, Dominick Trinchera and Philip Giaccone. This group opposed the current leadership under boss Philip Rastelli and his leading capos Joseph Massino and Dominick Napolitano.

In 1981, Massino and Napolitano set up the murders of the three rival capos in a Gravesend club co-owned by Sammy Gravano. After their deaths, Massino made peace with the rest of the leaderless faction, including Pitera. During the 1980s, Pitera became a made man of the Bonanno family and was assigned to Lino's crew by Bonanno consigliere Anthony Spero.

On August 29, 1988, Pitera allegedly ambushed and murdered Wilfred "Willie Boy" Johnson as he walked ahead to their car. Johnson had been a longtime associate and driver for Gambino family boss John Gotti. The hit was reportedly delegated to Pitera and fellow gunman Vincent "Kojak" Giattino after Gotti had discovered that Johnson had been a government informant since 1966. Pitera was charged with the Johnson murder but acquitted at trial.

Pitera was close to Spero, whose Bath Beach crew were involved in extortion, loan sharking, drug dealing and murder, as well as robbing drug dealers and then reselling their product. Pitera's associates, Lloyd Modell and Frank Martini, murdered two Colombian dealers and stole sixteen kilograms of cocaine. The killers intended to drive their car to Staten Island to bury the bodies, but as they could not drive a stick shift, they left the car – with the bodies inside the trunk – in a Brooklyn parking garage.

Martini moved back to Sicily and continued his relationship with the Bonanno crime family. Pitera killed Tala Siksik, a Middle Eastern drug supplier, in his Brooklyn apartment. Pitera shot Siksik four times in the back, chopped the body up into six pieces, and then buried it at a secret dumping ground. Investigators eventually found six of Pitera's victims in a mob graveyard in Staten Island near the William T. Davis Wildlife Refuge. Pitera had decapitated the bodies and buried the heads separately to impede their identification using dental records.

Pitera's approach to murder and body disposal was cold-hearted and clinical. He used the Staten Island graveyard because he believed that the damp soil would accelerate decomposition, and the wildlife refuge would ensure the bodies were not discovered during construction projects. Pitera studied books on dissection and carried a special tool kit for cutting up bodies. He always insisted on burying corpses deep enough so that police dogs could not locate their scents. Before burying body parts, he either wrapped them in plastic or placed them in suitcases. Pitera's weakness was that he enjoyed keeping jewelry and other souvenirs of his work.

On June 4, 1990, Pitera was indicted for heading a drug dealing crew and for his involvement in seven murders, including the 1988 Johnson murder. Investigators alleged he had been involved in as many as 30 murders. Pitera's crew sold about 220 pounds of cocaine per year, multiple kilos of heroin and hundreds of pounds of marijuana. Drug Enforcement Administration (DEA) agents discovered more than sixty automatic weapons, knives, swords, and literature such as The Hitman's Handbook and Kill or Be Killed, which dealt primarily with assassination techniques as well as torture and the dismemberment of cadavers, in Pitera's apartment in Gravesend.

=== Trial ===
One of Pitera's crew members, Frank Gangi, the nephew of Genovese family capo Rosario Gangi, decided to testify against Pitera. Frank had been arrested for driving under the influence and allegedly started reliving Pitera's worst atrocities in his mind while sitting in the holding cell. Frank confessed to all the murders he was involved in with Pitera, and provided information on other Pitera murders. Gangi also testified that during a fight with a drug dealer named Marek Kucharsky, Pitera pulled a knife and repeatedly stabbed Kucharsky and finally cut his throat.

In Pitera's trial, chief prosecutor David W. Shapiro demanded the death sentence for the "heinous, cruel and depraved" murders committed by Pitera. He called Pitera a "heartless and ruthless killer," explaining in detail how Pitera tortured one victim by slowly, deliberately shooting him seven times in various parts of the body, in one of a series of murders carried out in a deliberately barbaric manner. The prosecution also produced a DEA agent, who testified to digging up graves containing the dismembered bodies of some of Pitera's victims.

Pitera's defense lawyer, David A. Ruhnke, urged the jury to reject the death penalty on the grounds that Pitera had no prior criminal record and that other participants in the murders were allowed to plead guilty to lesser charges. Moreover, only two of the murder victims, Richard Leone and Solomon Stern, were killed on March 15, 1989, after the Federal death penalty law went into effect. The four other murders took place earlier, so those counts carried maximum sentences of life in prison. Pitera's aunt, sister-in-law and two cousins testified on Pitera's defense that he was a loving and caring family member.

=== Life sentence ===
On June 25, 1992, Pitera was convicted of murdering six people and supervising a massive drug dealing operation in Brooklyn. Pitera was acquitted in the 1988 Johnson murder. During the deliberation on sentencing, the jury rejected the death penalty for Pitera. In October 1992, alluding to evidence that Pitera brutally killed his victims and dismembered their bodies, Judge Reena Raggi sentenced him to life in prison, saying, "Mr. Pitera, nobody deserves to die as these people died."

After the verdict was read, Pitera smiled and gave a thumbs up to reporters sitting in the Brooklyn courtroom; he had avoided the death penalty. However, Pitera was irritated that Gangi was petitioning Judge Raggi for a reduction of his 10-year prison sentence. As Pitera later remarked,

Gangi said he was sorry about killing five people and that he became an informer because he wanted to start a new life. He gets 10 years, a good deal, and he goes whimpering and weeping to the judge looking for a break. If you're really sorry for killing five people, you take your punishment like a man.

Later in 1992, Judge Raggi again refused a motion to reduce Gangi's sentence. On April 3, 2012, the U.S. Second Circuit Court of Appeals denied Pitera's motion for DNA testing of the guns and other evidence in three of Pitera's murders. As of April 2017, Pitera is serving a life sentence at the United States Penitentiary, McCreary near Pine Knot, Kentucky. Pitera's inmate number is 29465-053.
