= Stephen Grammauta =

American mobster

Stephen "Stevie Coogan" Grammauta (December 6, 1916 – 2016) was a caporegime with the Gambino crime family who allegedly participated in the murder of mob boss Albert "Mad Hatter" Anastasia and was the acting underboss of the family.

== Early life and crime ==
Born on the Lower East Side of Manhattan, Grammauta was a drug trafficker by the early 1930s. In the late 1940s, Graummauta became a full member, or made man, with the Mangano crime family, later known as the Gambino family, under its founder and boss Vincenzo "Don Vincent" Mangano.

In 1951, with the disappearance of Vincent Mangano and the murder of his brother Phil Mangano in 1951, then caporegime Anastasia became boss. A former head of Murder, Inc., Anastasia was one of the most dangerous and murderous mobsters in New York. Anastasia promoted another caporegime after the murder of previous Anastasia underboss Frank Scalise, Carlo Gambino, to be his underboss. During this period, Grammauta worked in a crew with brothers Joseph "Joe Piney" Armone and Stephen Armone.

== Killing Anastasia ==
In 1957, the other New York City crime families started questioning Anastasia's leadership. Anastasia had reportedly been murdering innocent people just because he felt like it, as he once ordered the murder of a tailor he saw on television, just because the tailor had been robbed and reputedly was filing his report. Other Mob bosses such as Vito "Don Vito" Genovese and Thomas "Tommy Brown" Lucchese and Meyer Lansky eventually had enough of Anastasia. In 1957, Gambino ordered Joseph "Joe the Blonde" Biondo and Stephen Armone to murder Anastasia. Stephen reportedly included his brother Joseph on the hit, but Joseph had been arrested on drug charges. Stephen then replaced Joseph with Grammauta. On the morning of October 25, 1957, Anastasia entered the barber shop of the Park Sheraton Hotel (now the Park Central Hotel) in Manhattan. As Anastasia relaxed in the barber chair, Grammauta, Arnold Wittenburg, and Stephen Armone rushed in, shoved the barber out of the way, and started shooting. The wounded Anastasia allegedly lunged at his killers, but only hit their reflections in the wall mirror. Anastasia died at the scene.

After Anastasia was killed, Profaci crime family mobsters Carmine "Junior" Persico and Joseph "Crazy Joe" Gallo claimed credit for the murder. Grammauta and his two associates were never seen as the real killers. No one was ever arrested or tried for the murder of Albert Anastasia.

== Jailed with Armone ==
In 1965, Grammauta and Joseph Armone were convicted of smuggling heroin into the United States from the Netherlands and received eight-year prison sentences. In 1970, both men were released from prison and Armone was promoted to caporegime of his brother's old crew. Graummauta spent the next 25 years as a soldier in Joseph Armone's crew.

After Gambino's death in 1976, his brother in law Paul Castellano became family boss. Castellano soon became enmeshed in a rivalry with caporegime John Gotti. Gotti had a poor relationship with Grammauta as Gotti considered him to be a dangerous rival. In 1985, Gotti organized Castellano's assassination and became the new Gambino boss. Grammauta's shot of becoming promoted sank. In 1992, Gotti was convicted of murder and sentenced to life in prison.

== The Committee/Panel ==
With Gotti in prison, Grammauta finally became a caporegime in 1994, taking over Jack Giordano's crew. In 1996, Grammauta was named to a Ruling Committee/Panel to assist acting boss John "Junior" Gotti in running the family. Grammauta sat and contributed as acting boss in the panel from 1996 to 2002, when it was disbanded after John Gotti's death. Grammauta then went back serving as caporegime.
