= Leonard DiMaria =

American mobster

- Born: October 10, 1941 (age 85); Brooklyn, New York, U.S.
- Other names: "Lenny"; "Prateek"; "The Conductor"
- Occupation: Mobster
- Allegiance: Gambino crime family
- Convictions: Racketeering, extortion, loan sharking (1997); Racketeering, extortion, and conspiracy (2008)
- Penalty: Ten years' imprisonment Five years' imprisonment

Leonard "Lenny" DiMaria (born October 10, 1941), also known as "Prateek" and "the Conductor", is an American mobster and member of the Gambino crime family of New York. He is considered by law enforcement to be a close associate of Nicholas Corozzo and has served as his right-hand-man for almost 30 years.

== Criminal career ==
=== Brooklyn gangster ===
DiMaria was born to Italian immigrants from Moliterno, province of Potenza. Before entering a life of crime, he worked as a railroad conductor for the Long Island Rail Road and employee of the New York and Atlantic Railway. These early jobs earned him the nickname "The Conductor". In the early 1980s, DiMaria became a captain in the Gambino crime family. His driver and bodyguard Thomas "Spade" Muschio, age 24 who was incarcerated in 1983 at Raiford Florida State Prison until his release in 1985. After his work release program he was put on probation until 1988. They both operated loansharking and extortion operations in both Queens and Brooklyn.They both became a close associate of Nicholas Corozzo. Muschio was introduced to Organized Crime by Robert (Bobby Cabert) Bisaccia.

DiMaria was part of a racketeering case in August 1986, that included boss John Gotti, Willie Boy Johnson, (who, despite being exposed as an informant, refused to turn state's evidence) Tony Rampino, Nicholas Corozzo and John Carneglia. On March 13, 1987, they acquitted all defendants of all charges.

=== South Florida and New York indictments ===
In 1995, DiMaria, and Gambino capos Ralph Davino, Jr. and Anthony Ruggiano, Jr., together with Anthony "Tony Pep" Trentacosta, started operating in Florida on behalf of Corozzo. These three capos would be called the "South Florida Crew", operating from both New York and Florida.

On December 18, 1996, DiMaria was arrested at his home in Flatlands, Brooklyn on loansharking and racketeering charges in Florida. While out on bail, DiMaria was indicted a month later on separate loansharking and racketeering charges in New York after a three-year investigation by the Federal Bureau of Investigation (FBI). The New York indictments were based partly on evidence gathered at the Portobello Soccer Club in Canarsie, Brooklyn. The club was a sting operation that purchased stolen designer clothing, computers, and other goods from Gambino mobsters. DiMaria reportedly became friends with the FBI uncover agent who ran the sting and was seen hugging him on surveillance video. After six weeks in house arrest, DiMaria and Corozzo were sent to a federal lockup to await trials in New York and Florida.

On November 3, 1997, DiMaria pleaded guilty to 15 New York charges, including racketeering, extortion and loansharking. and received a 10-year prison sentence, to be served in Cumberland, Maryland. In January 1998, DiMaria pleaded guilty to the Florida charges.

=== Operation Old Bridge ===
Released from prison in 2005, DiMaria returned to running racketeering and loansharking operations in Queens, Brooklyn, and South Florida for Corozzo and John "Jackie Nose" D'Amico. It was speculated that DiMaria might have become underboss.

In February 2008, DiMaria was indicted in Operation Old Bridge, a massive federal investigation of the Gambino family. On June 4, 2008, DiMaria pleaded guilty to racketeering and extortion-related charges. DiMaria further admitted to conspiring to extort money from contractor/trucker Joseph Vollaro. Vollaro, a former Mafia associate, had become an informant to avoid prosecution and recorded conversations with other mobsters over a three-year period.

DiMaria was incarcerated at the Federal Correctional Institution, Otisville. He was released from prison on August 31, 2012.
