= Thomas Cacciopoli =

American mobster

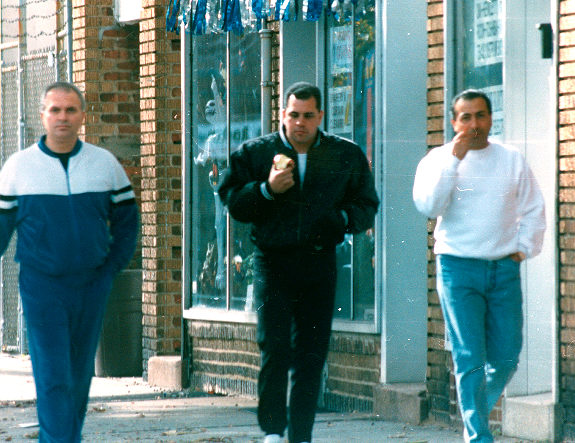
Cacciopoli (left), with "Junior" Gotti (middle) and John Cavallo in an FBI surveillance photo.

Thomas Cacciopoli (born September 5, 1949), also known as Tommy Sneakers and Cacci, is an American mobster of the Gambino crime family, holding the rank of caporegime in the Queens, New Jersey, and Westchester faction of the family.

== Days of John Gotti ==
After John Gotti became boss in December 1985, Cacciopoli became a made member in the crew led by Gotti's son, John "Junior" Gotti and brother Peter Gotti. When John Gotti went to prison in 1992 and Junior Gotti became acting boss, Cacciopoli became Junior's top protegee and bodyguard. Cacciopoli allegedly received his moniker "Tommy Twitch" because he suffered from facial neuralgia, an uncontrollable muscle spasm condition.

== Days of Junior Gotti ==
During the late 1990s, Cacciopoli was indicted along with dozens of other members of the Gambino family, as the U.S. government charged Junior Gotti with conspiracy and association with known organized crime members, in 1998. Following Gotti Jr. stepping down as acting boss in 1999, and the elevation of Peter Gotti as acting boss in 2000, Cacciopoli was listed as a caporegime of the Gambino family, with a crew and illegal activities originally based in the New Jersey faction, with possible operations in Manhattan.

== Capo and indictments ==
On March 9, 2005, Cacciopoli was indicted on charges of extorting payments from construction companies in Staten Island and Long Island. Cacciopoli was indicted on four counts of breaking the Hobbs Act Extortion (HAE), which shows that Cacciopoli was possibly involved in extortion operations in New Jersey. In September 2006, before the trial start, Cacciopolio, along with most of the defendants, accepted a plea arrangement from the government.

On February 8, 2008, as part of the Operation Old Bridge investigation, Cacciopoli was again indicted on racketeering charges. The indictment stated that the defendants ran extortion rackets at the NASCAR track construction site in Staten Island and the Liberty View Harbor site in Jersey City, New Jersey. Government witness Joseph Vallaro testified that Cacciopoli extorted over $160,000 from Vallaro's trucking company. On February 28, 2008, the government offered a plea deal to Cacciopoli and most of the other defendants.

On April 4, 2011, Cacciopoli was released from prison.
