= Joseph Lanza =

Italian-American organized crime figure (1904–1968)

- NYPD mugshot of Joseph Lanza
- Born: 1904; Palermo, Sicily, Italy
- Died: October 11, 1968 (aged 63–64)
- Other name: Socks
- Allegiance: Genovese crime family
- Criminal charges: Labor racketeering (1938), extortion
- Penalty: Extortion (7.5 - 10 years imprisonment)

Joseph A. "Socks" Lanza (1904 – October 11, 1968) was a New York labor racketeer and a member of the Genovese crime family, who controlled the Fulton Fish Market in Lower Manhattan through the United Seafood Worker's Union local 359 from 1923 to 1968.

== Biography ==
Born in Palermo, Sicily, Lanza immigrated to the United States and settled in New York working as a handler in Lower Manhattan's Fulton Fish Market. Lanza soon became involved in labor union activity and, by 1923, had become an organizer for the United Seafood Workers union (USW). It was during this time that Lanza had become involved in organized crime, eventually becoming a member of the Luciano (and later the Genovese) crime family. As head of the Local 359 USW, Lanza threatened wholesalers with delays in loading and unloading perishable goods resulting in profits of $20 million from the Fulton Fish Market alone.

=== Operation Underworld ===
During World War 2, Lanza was involved with Operation Underworld, a project that involved cooperation between the US government and the American mafia in securing the ports and waterfronts from sabotage, espionage, and other threats. Lanza was not paid for his services and insisted that he acted out of patriotism. Lanza's involvement began in March 1942, after members of the Office of Naval Intelligence (ONI) approached Murray Gurfein, assistant district attorney of New York County, asking him to put them in contact with Lanza. Gurfein suggested connacting Lanza through a third party. As it happened, Lanza was indicted for extortion in 1941 and the case was still making its way through the courts, he therefore contacted Lanza's lawyer Joseph K. Guerin. With the approval of District Attorney Frank Hogan, Gurfein met with Guerin who communicated Lanza's willingness to cooperate. Next, the three met at 11:30PM in order to avoid attention. Gurfein pulled up in a taxicab and beckoned Lanza and his lawyer into the car, they travelled to Riverside Park and spoke on a bench about the proposed cooperation, with Gurfein making it clear that Lanza's extortion indictment was not up for negotiation as a result of any cooperation he may give.

After a meeting with Commander Charles Haffenden of ONI at the Astor Hotel, it was agreed that Lanza would allow the US Navy to station its own men at the docks under the cover of working for Lanza. He provided ONI agents with United Seafood Workers Union cards and kept ONI abreast of any unusual or suspicious activity in the docks. Lanza and Haffenden would meet a weekly basis to discuss developments. Lanza was the original mafia contact of Operation Underworld, which later expanded to include Lucky Luciano and Meyer Lansky. Lanza was given permission to visit Luciano in jail to propose to him that he become involved.

On 12 January 1943 Lanza pled guilty to six counts of extortion and also for conspiracy. He was sentenced to seven and half to fifteen years in prison. There was no mention of Lanza's cooperation with ONI during his trial. Lanza's lawyer requested leniency, claiming he had been an asset to the community, referring to his work with the union. Judge Wallace was unimpressed, contrarily describing Lanza as an "unmitigated nuisance to the community". His imprisonment marked the end of his involvement in Operation Underworld.

== See also ==
- Carmine Romano
- Rosario Gangi
- Alphonse "Allie Shades" Malangone
