= Joaquín "Jack" García =

Cuban-American retired FBI agent (born 1952)

- Born: 1952 (age 73–74); Havana, Cuba
- Other name: Jack Falcone
- Occupation: FBI agent
- Years active: 1980-2006
- Known for: infiltrating the Gambino crime family as an undercover FBI agent
- Notable work: Making Jack Falcone: An Undercover FBI Agent Takes Down a Mafia Family

Joaquín "Jack" García (born 1952) is a Cuban-American retired FBI agent, best known for his undercover work infiltrating the Gambino crime family in New York City.

== Background ==
García was born in Havana, Cuba in 1952. His family fled to the United States to escape Fidel Castro's regime when he was nine years old. He grew up in the Bronx, New York where he attended Mount Saint Michael Academy. He received full football scholarships and played at West Texas State University, Westchester Community College and at the University of Richmond where he subsequently graduated in May 1975. His large size (6'4", 390 lbs.) benefited both his football and later undercover careers. García applied for the FBI soon after graduation and was sworn in for duty as a special agent in May 1980.

== FBI career ==
García worked undercover in successful cases against corrupt politicians in Atlantic City, New Jersey and corrupt police officers in the Hollywood Police Department, the Broward County Sheriff's Office, Boston Police Department and in the Puerto Rico Police Department. He has also worked undercover against hundreds of drug dealers and leaders of both Colombian and Mexican drug cartels, while posing as either a money launderer, transporter or trafficker. He has done undercover work on national and international terrorism cases as well as national security investigations. García has also worked undercover against Russian and Asian organized crime groups. García worked on many of these cases simultaneously, as he juggled his various undercover identities and roles. García worked as an undercover FBI special agent for 24 out of his 26 years of service without ever being discovered as an FBI agent.

=== Operation Jack Falcone ===
In his 26 years of service with the FBI and as an undercover agent in over 100 undercover operations, García is best known for his undercover role as "Jack Falcone," a self-described Sicilian jewel thief and drug dealer from Miami, Florida, who penetrated the Gambino crime family of the American Mafia in New York City for nearly three years. The case resulted in the arrest and conviction of 32 mobsters, including the top members of the Gambino crime family, including Acting Boss Arnold Squitieri and Acting Underboss Anthony Megale.

García played his undercover role so convincingly that Gregory DePalma, a high-ranking Gambino family captain, offered to induct him into the family. If García continued in his undercover role, he could have been the first undercover law enforcement officer to become a soldier in a Mafia crime family. García is only the second agent to have ever been considered for induction. In the late 1970s Joseph D. Pistone became the first during his infiltration of the Bonanno crime family under the alias Donnie Brasco. García's investigation ceased in March, 2005 when his FBI supervisors, against García's wishes, decided to terminate the investigation. In the end, the FBI produced sufficient evidence to convict DePalma at trial while the others defendants took plea deals. Due to García's efforts, DePalma was sentenced to twelve years in federal prison. DePalma died in prison custody of natural causes in 2009.

== Book ==
In 2008, García released Making Jack Falcone: An Undercover FBI Agent Takes Down a Mafia Family, a book detailing some of his undercover cases and experiences with the FBI, including his successful infiltration into the Gambino crime family. The book became a New York Times Bestseller. A movie based on the book and García's life was announced in 2010, with actor Benicio del Toro cast to play the lead role and Steven Soderbergh, Michael Shamberg, Stacey Sher and John Henson as producers.
