= Angelo Ponte =

American mobster

Angelo F. Ponte (April 20, 1925 – December 12, 2018) was an American mobster. He was reportedly active in the Genovese family's carting rackets for many decades. He was careful to cultivate political connections, and managed to have himself named a Knight of Malta by the Catholic Church.

Ponte was a target of the operation wasteland investigation. On January 28, 1997, he pleaded guilty to participating in a Mafia run operation to control and manipulate the cartage business in New York City. At the same hearing, his son Vincent pleaded guilty to paying a $10,000 bribe.

He was the founder of F. Illi Ponte Ristorante on the West Side highway and has extensive real estate holdings throughout the Lower West Side (Manhattan). Ponte died in February 2017 at the age of 92. He had four siblings: Vincent, John, Margaret, and Dina.
