= Carmine Romano =

American mobster

Carmine Romano (August 21, 1935 – January 28, 2011) was a New York mobster and captain in the Genovese Crime Family who controlled the Fulton Fish Market distribution center in Downtown Manhattan.

== Mob control of Fulton Fish Market ==
Beginning in the 1920s, the Fulton Fish Market had been controlled by mobsters. Unloading crews would extort "parking fees" and kickbacks from out of town fish companies. If a company refused to pay, the unloaders would let the fish spoil. Mob employees and mob-controlled companies received special benefits. The Market’s security force operated a protection racket for retail shops and vehicles located on the margins of the Market waterfront.

== Prison for Romano ==
Authorities made some small efforts to clean up the corruption. In the late 1970s, Romano was removed from the leadership of the seafood union for extorting wholesalers and enforcing a cartel. Finally, in 1981 Mob boss Romano was shifting control into New Jersey to his younger crew. Herman Weiner took control of operations in New Jersey and was untouched for many years. Later in 1982 Romano was convicted of racketeering and sent to prison for 14 years. However, Genovese domination of the market continued.

Before going to prison in 1981, Romano tried to intimidate the current non-mob owner of Carmine's restaurant into selling it back to Romano's uncle. According to court documents, Romano and associates visited the owner on the morning of January 21, 1981. They began their visit by breaking glasses, smashing all the windows, mirrors, tables, and chairs, throwing food around, destroying the coffee and cigarette machines, and yanking the stove out of the wall. Finally, they robbed the cash register and left. Despite this attempt at intimidation, the owner refused to sell it back.

== Cleanup of Fish Market ==
In 1994, new mayor Rudy Giuliani launched a campaign to end mob control of the market. Through civil suits and new regulations, the city expelled mob employees and vendors and ended the extortion rackets against honest seafood vendors. The Genovese family retaliated with arson and wildcat strikes, but were unable to stop the city.

== Aftermath ==
In 1999, Romano was released from prison and moved to New Bedford, Massachusetts, where he was the owner of Hygrade Ocean Products. In November 2005, the City of New York moved all seafood wholesale operations to a new facility in Hunts Point in the Bronx and permanently closed the Fulton Fish Market. Romano died January 28, 2011, in New Bedford.

== See also ==
- Joseph Lanza
- Alphonse "Allie Shades" Malangone
- Rosario Gangi
