= Rosario Gangi =

American mobster

- Born: November 10, 1939 (age 86); New York City, New York, U.S.
- Other name: "Ross"
- Occupation: Mobster
- Criminal penalty: 97 months' imprisonment (1999); 78 months' imprisonment (2002)

Rosario "Ross" Gangi (born November 10, 1939) is a New York City mobster and former captain in the Genovese crime family who became involved in labor racketeering and white collar crime.

== Biography ==
His father, uncles and cousins were associated with the Bonanno and Genovese crime families. His uncle Angelo Prezzanzano was a capo in the Bonanno crime family and his cousin Frank Gangi Jr. and uncle Frank Gangi Sr. were both drug dealers. In August 1960, Rosario's paternal uncle Frank Sr. was murdered in a mob-related incident that involved Sicilian hit men being brought down from Montreal, Canada to kill Frank Tuminaro and Gangi Sr. It was suspected the murders were carried out by Genovese mobster Charles Gagliodotto, who in August 1969 was found strangled to death, supposedly by members of Tuminaro's family.

== Fish tycoon ==
As a Genovese family associate, Gangi began working at the Fulton Fish Market in Lower Manhattan. Genovese mobster Carmine Romano controlled the $1 billion per year seafood industry at the market. On August 13, 1981, Gangi was indicted on federal racketeering charges involving the Fish Market and Local 359 of the United Seafood Workers Union, which represented the market's unionized fish handlers. In the early 1990s, Gangi became a caporegime in the Genovese family and ran the fish rackets with Brooklyn captain Alphonse "Allie Shades" Malangone. During the mid-1990s, Gangi's son Thomas Gangi came under fire as an officer of Preferred Quality Seafood, a seafood wholesaler. The company was later evicted from the Fish Market due to its noncompliance with the probe on mob control of the market.

During the mid-1990s, Gangi discovered a large-scale surveillance campaign by the Federal Bureau of Investigation and New York Police Department (NYPD) against the Genovese family. Since boss Vincent Gigante had gone to prison the last time, the family had assumed a lower-key public image and become more security-conscious to prevent its high-level members from serving long prison terms.

== Criminal schemes ==
On November 25, 1997, Gangi, his top soldier Ernest Montevecchi, and Bonanno crime family captain Frank Lino were indicted in a massive stock fraud and manipulation indictment. The scheme was a classic "pump and dump" stock scam. The mobsters acquired a large position in the stock of HealthTech International Inc., a Mesa, Arizona, health and fitness firm that was traded on the NASDAQ Stock Exchange. Tens of thousands of shares were given to the mobsters by top HealthTech officials Gordon Hall and Joe Kirkham. The crime families then bribed and threatened brokers at the Wall Street firm of Meyers Pollock Robins Inc., to sell the stock to unsuspecting investors. Once the stock price reached an inflated level, the mobsters sold their shares and made huge profits, leaving individual investors with worthless stock. The indictment also alleged that the mobsters conspired to defraud the Staten Island Savings Bank in Staten Island, New York, and Sun Records, a famous recording label in Memphis, Tennessee.

On February 17, 1998, Gangi, Genovese associate John Albert, and Gambino crime family soldier Vincent DiModica were indicted for extorting contractors and scheming to defraud the Port Authority of New York and New Jersey, which operates Newark International Airport. Gangi received kickbacks, disguised as consulting fees, from companies constructing the $350 million monorail network at the airport. On July 27, 1998, Gangi, Albert and DiModica, were convicted on the Newark Airport charges. On January 21, 1999, Gangi pleaded guilty to his involvement in the HealthTech case and was sentenced to a 97-month prison term.

On December 5, 2001, Gangi and Genovese captains Pasquale Parrello and Joseph Dente, Jr. were charged with extortion, robbery conspiracy, gun trafficking, loan sharking, labor racketeering and embezzlement, credit card fraud, trafficking in untaxed liquor and cigarettes, gambling and counterfeiting. The indictment was the result of the undercover work of an NYPD officer who operated under the moniker "Big Frankie". This undercover officer, who was actually being considered for family membership, would often eat lunch with Parrello. On April 30, 2002, Gangi pleaded guilty to racketeering in the 2001 charges and was sentenced to 78 months in prison.

Gangi was imprisoned at the Federal Correctional Institution - Schuylkill in Minersville, Pennsylvania. He was released on August 8, 2008.

== See also ==
- Carmine Romano
- Joseph Lanza
- Alphonse "Allie Shades" Malangone
