= Nicholas Corozzo =

American New York mobster

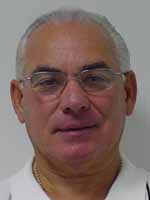
- Corozzo in 2004.
- Born: March 17, 1940 (age 86); New York City, U.S.
- Other name: Little Nicky
- Occupation: Mobster
- Children: 1
- Relatives: Joseph, Blaise, and Anthony (brothers)
- Allegiance: Gambino crime family
- Convictions: Racketeering, attempted murder, arson, loan sharking (1997); Murder, racketeering, extortion, conspiracy (2008)
- Penalty: 8 years' imprisonment (1997); 13 years' imprisonment (2009)

Nicholas "Little Nicky" Corozzo (born March 17, 1940) is an American mobster who serves as a caporegime in the Gambino crime family of New York City.

== Criminal career ==
Nicholas Corozzo was born at 1825 Pitkin Avenue in the Brownsville neighborhood of Brooklyn. Corozzo's first headquarters was located in a small candy store on the corner of Eastern Parkway & Atlantic Avenue in the Ocean Hill section of Brooklyn, known as "The Hill" to his crew members. He later opened a social club next to the candy store which became his new headquarters. Corozzo later moved his headquarters to the Canarsie section of Brooklyn.

Nicholas is the older brother of alleged reputed Gambino consigliere Joseph "Jo Jo" Corozzo as well as twin brothers Blaise Corozzo, a Gambino soldier, and Anthony Corozzo, who was an associate of the Gambino crime family. Anthony Corozzo was a longtime parishioner of Our Lady of Loreto Church located at the corner of Pacific Street & Sackman Street in Brownsville where he regularly attended Sunday mass. Anthony Corozzo along with his lifelong friend and Gambino crime family associate Dominick Mondelli aka Donny Mondelli, were well known for organizing neighborhood reunions and charitable events for the church for decades. Anthony died on April 17, 2020. Nicholas Corozzo is the uncle of Joseph Corozzo Jr, a high-profile New York defense attorney. Nicholas' daughter, Bernadette, is married to Gambino associate Vincent Dragonetti. Prior to Corozzo's incarceration, he lived in Bellmore, Long Island. He stands at 5′5" tall and weighs approximately 170 pounds.

=== Ruling panel ===
During the early 1980s, Nicholas Corozzo was a bitter rival of Gambino captain John Gotti. When Gotti became boss of the family in 1986, he declined to promote Corozzo to captain. However, since Corozzo was such a good earner for the family, Gotti did not want to get rid of him. In turn, Corozzo professed loyalty to Gotti. It was only after Gotti went to prison in 1992 that Corozzo was finally promoted to captain, along with Gambino soldier Leonard "Lenny" DiMaria. With Gotti in prison, Corozzo, DiMaria, and Nicholas' brother, Joseph, now the alleged consigliere, formed a ruling panel that unofficially ran the Gambino family. In the mid-1990s, Corozzo was elevated to serve on the ruling panel.

In 1996, Corozzo allegedly ordered the murder of Lucchese crime family associate Robert Arena. Arena had allegedly murdered Anthony Placido, a member of Corozzo's crew, and had failed to return some stolen marijuana to a drug dealer. On June 26, 1996, the Gambino gunmen found Arena driving with Thomas Maranga, an Arena childhood acquaintance with no criminal connections, in the Mill Basin section of Brooklyn. After forcing Arena to stop the car, the gunmen shot and killed both men. However, until this day there is no concrete evidence that Corozzo ordered the murder of Robert Arena.

=== Florida arrest ===
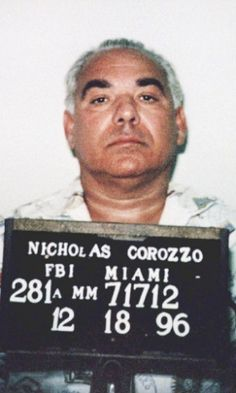
FBI Mugshot of Nicholas Corozzo on December 18, 1996

In December, 1996, Corozzo was indicted in Miami, Florida on 20 racketeering charges that included attempted murder, arson, and loansharking. Corozzo was accused of running a loansharking business in Deerfield Beach, Florida that charged 260% yearly interest on loans. Federal agents arrested Corozzo as he emerged from the surf at a beach in Key Biscayne, Florida. In August 1997, Corozzo pleaded guilty to racketeering charges in Florida and was sentenced to five to ten years in prison. Later that year, Corrozo again pleaded guilty in Brooklyn to racketeering and bribing a jail guard.

While in federal prison, Corozzo shared a cell with Gambino associate Joseph Vollaro, who was serving a drug conviction. After his release, Vollaro started paying tribute to Corozzo's crew on a trucking company he started. However, facing another drug conviction in 2004, Vollaro agreed to become a government informant and record his conversations with Corozzo.

After Corozzo's release from prison on June 10, 2004, it was expected he would again take over the Gambino crime family. However, due to increased law enforcement attention, he initially kept a low profile. The Gambinos were reportedly led by Jackie D'Amico until 2005. Corozzo kept his position as a Caporegime, despite health concerns and tight parole restrictions. In 2006, a new report stated that Nicholas Corozzo and D'Amico were the new bosses of the Gambino family, with Arnold "Zeke" Squitieri as underboss and Joseph Corozzo as consigliere.

=== Indictment and imprisonment ===
In February 2008, Corozzo was indicted twice, one for the federal Operation Old Bridge and the other for the state Operation Touchback. The federal indictment was for the 1996 Arena and Maranga murders and other racketeering charges, with Vollaro as their main witness. The state indictment, prosecuted by Queens County District Attorney Richard A. Brown, Organized Crime and Rackets Bureau Chief Gerard A. Assistant District Attorney Benjamin J. Mantell, included the top count of enterprise corruption surrounding a Queens-based gambling ring that grossed almost $10 million over two years from sports betting.

Amid a roundup of 62 mobsters named in an indictment, Corozzo had fled his Long Island home. The FBI searched intensively for Corozzo and the television program America's Most Wanted did a feature on him. On May 29, 2008, after four months as a fugitive, Corozzo walked into the FBI's New York City office and surrendered.

In July 2008, Corozzo pleaded guilty to the state enterprise corruption charges. On April 17, 2009, Corozzo was sentenced to 13 1/2 years in federal prison for the 1996 Arena and Maranga murders.

Corozzo was originally incarcerated at the United States Penitentiary, Leavenworth, a medium security facility in Leavenworth, Kansas, but was later moved to the Federal Correctional Complex, Florence, a high security facility in Florence, Colorado. As of March 2015, he was incarcerated at the Federal Correctional Institution, Loretto, a low security facility in Loretto, Pennsylvania. As of March 2018, Corozzo was imprisoned at the low security Federal Correctional Institution, Allenwood Low in Allenwood, Pennsylvania. His projected release date was March 2, 2020, but he was released early on November 29, 2019.

American Mafia
Preceded by John "Junior" Gotti	Gambino crime family Acting boss 1996–1997	Succeeded by John "Junior" Gotti
Preceded by Arnold "Zeke" Squitieri	Gambino crime family Acting boss 2005–2008	Domenico Cefalù
