= Joseph Armone =

American mobster (1917–1992)

- Armone in an undated mugshot
- Born: September 13, 1917; New York City, U.S.
- Died: February 23, 1992 (aged 74); New York City, U.S.
- Resting place: Cemetery of the Resurrection
- Other names: "Joe Piney", "Shorty"
- Occupation: Mobster
- Known for: Underboss of the Gambino crime family
- Predecessor: Frank DeCicco
- Successor: Sammy Gravano
- Spouse: Josephine DiQuarto
- Relatives: Stephen Armone (brother)
- Allegiance: Gambino crime family
- Convictions: Drug trafficking (1965); Racketeering (1987)
- Penalty: 15 years' imprisonment; served 10 years 15 years' imprisonment, $820,000 fine

Joseph Armone (September 13, 1917 – February 23, 1992), also known as "Joe Piney", was an American mobster in the Gambino crime family of New York City who served as underboss between 1986 and 1990, and consigliere from 1990 until his death in 1992.

== Early life ==
Born on the Upper East Side of Manhattan, Armone was raised at 406 East 11th Street in Manhattan's East Village. He was the younger brother of mobster Stephen Armone, an early member of the Mangano crime family, forerunner of the Gambino family. Armone married Josephine DiQuarto and was the father of two children. Josephine is a relative of Genovese crime family capo Dominick DiQuarto. He was uncle to Gambino crime family capo Joseph "Joey The Blonde" Giordano. A devoted family man, Joseph Armone stayed away from mistresses; Armone and his family lived in Brooklyn. He earned his nickname "Piney" in the 1930s by extorting money from Christmas tree vendors.

== Criminal career ==
=== French Connection ===
Armone followed his brother into the Mangano family. By the time Albert "Mad Hatter" Anastasia took over the Mangano family in 1951, he had become one of the family's major earners. Armone was an associate of Joseph Biondo, who controlled the family's part in the French Connection heroin smuggling network. In 1957, underboss Biondo allegedly picked Armone and two other family mobsters to kill Anastasia. However, before the attack could take place, Armone was arrested on a narcotics charge and sent to jail. Biondo allegedly replaced Armone with his brother Stephen and the hitmen killed Anastasia. However, other accounts suggest that Profaci crime family capo Joe Gallo and his crew members were responsible for the Anastasia murder. Following Stephen Armone's death in 1960, Biondo anointed Joseph Armone as overseer of the Gambino family heroin operations.

According to the Federal Bureau of Narcotics (FBN), Armone frequented De Robertis Pasticceria and Lulu's Bar at 207 Second Avenue and headed a drug ring which operated in the area of East 14th Street and First Avenue. In October 1960, a French drug smuggler and the Guatemalan ambassador to Belgium and the Netherlands were arrested by the FBN as they delivered 100 pounds of pure heroin to an associate of Armone, longshoreman Nicholas Calamaris, on Lexington Avenue. Another 100 pounds of the drug were seized during subsequent raids on stash houses throughout New York City, making it the FBN's largest heroin seizure at the time. Armone was then arrested when he told an informant to make a drug delivery to Calamaris at 116th Street. The FBN also identified other French nationals who had discussed the price of the heroin with Joe Biondo, who had financed the drug operation, at his summer home in Long Beach, Long Island. The identity of the organization's financier remained a mystery to the FBN, however, and Armone was imprisoned on drug charges when he refused to reveal the identity of Biondo.

In January 1964, Armone survived an assassination attempt. He was in the Reno bar in Manhattan when a gunman shot him five times at point blank range. The Federal Bureau of Investigation (FBI) reported that Biondo visited Armone at Columbus Hospital every day for three months.

On October 1, 1964, Armone and 11 other mobsters were indicted in what became the French Connection case. They were accused of transporting $20 million worth of heroin from 1956 to 1965 from France to the U.S. using sailors, businessmen and a diplomat as drug couriers. During the trial, one of the jurors was approached outside the courthouse by Patricia DeAlesandro, a former Playboy bunny and a friend of Armone. DeAlesandro tried to bribe the juror, but he reported the incident to law enforcement. DeAlesandro was later convicted of bribery and sentenced to five years in prison.

On June 22, 1965, Armone was convicted of the French Connection charges. In July 1965, Armone was sentenced to 15 years in prison.

After serving ten years in prison, Armone was released. When mobster Paul Castellano became family boss, he promoted Armone to caporegime. Mob author and journalist Jerry Capeci would cite Armone's success as an example of the American Mafia disregarding its official ban of dealing drugs.

=== Gotti era ===
In 1985. Armone was recruited by capo John Gotti into a conspiracy to kill Castellano. Gotti already had the support of capo Frank DeCicco and soldiers Sammy Gravano and Robert DiBernardo, but lining up the support of Armone was a critical step in the conspiracy. As a respected old-timer in the Gambino family, Armone would offer more credibility to the new regime and placate Castellano's supporters. For his part, Armone had a dim view of Castellano as a gangster and saw Gotti's coup as a final chance to rise to a leadership role in the family.

That chance came in April 1986, when Gotti's original underboss, Frank DeCicco, was blown up by a remote-controlled bomb. Gotti then appointed Armone as his new underboss and sent him to Florida to supervise Gambino activities there.

On December 22, 1987, Armone was convicted in New York on charges of racketeering conspiracy involving extortion, bribery and illegal interstate travel to commit bribery. The bribery charge involved a plot from 1981 to 1982 to bribe a government official $20,000 to transfer the son of Gambino consigliere Joseph N. Gallo from a New York state prison to a federal prison. Gallo was also convicted in the trial. Under federal sentencing guidelines, any sentence imposed on Gallo and Armone at their ages would all but assure they would die in prison. With this in mind, the judge released Gallo on bail before sentencing, effectively giving him a final Christmas with his family. Armone was offered a similar temporary release, but only on the condition that he publicly admit his role in the family and renounce his ties to it. Gotti, however, had banned Gambino members from taking plea deals that acknowledged the existence of the family and refused Armone an exception.

On February 22, 1988, Armone was sentenced to 15 years in federal prison and was fined $820,000.

On September 24, 1988, in a separate case, Armone was acquitted by a directed verdict in Florida of extortion, loansharking, and racketeering in Broward County.

== Death ==
On February 23, 1992, Armone died in prison of natural causes.

== In media ==
Armone is portrayed by Dominic Chianese in the 1996 TV film Gotti. In the 2001 television movie Boss of Bosses, he is portrayed as "Piney Armone" by actor Mark Margolis.

American Mafia
Preceded by Frank DeCicco	Gambino crime family Underboss; 1986-1990	Succeeded by Salvatore "Sammy the Bull" Gravano
Preceded by Salvatore "Sammy the Bull" Gravano	Gambino crime family Consigliere; 1990-1992	Succeeded by Joseph "Jo Jo" Corozzo
