= Giovanni Inzerillo =

American gangster of Italian descent

Giovanni Inzerillo

Giovanni Inzerillo (born in Brooklyn, New York, April 30, 1972), is a construction entrepreneur and son of Salvatore Inzerillo, a notorious Sicilian Mafia boss who was killed in May 1981 on the orders of Mafia boss Salvatore "Totò" Riina during the Second Mafia War.

After the Corleonesi killed his father, they also murdered his 15-year-old brother, Giuseppe. Giuseppe had vowed to avenge his father, and not long afterwards he was kidnapped, tortured and killed. A number of informants, including Tommaso Buscetta, said that it was Pino Greco who abducted and shot him through the head, but first hacked his arm off, symbolically removing the arm the youngster had vowed to shoot Riina with.

When Totò Riina gave the instructions to exterminate the clan he made it quite clear: "Not even the pips must remain from the Inzerillo family". The Inzerillo family had been on the verge of total extermination by the Corleonesi. With the intervention of relatives in New York, including associates of the Gambino crime family, a deal was worked out that allowed the surviving Inzerillos to take refuge in the U.S., with the agreement that none of them, or their offspring, could ever return to Sicily. Many went to the New York area and joined forces with the Gambino family. They were dubbed "gli scappati" (the escapees).

Giovanni returned to Sicily in 2000. Officially he is a building constructor and lives in the same house his father lived in at 346 Via Castellana in the district of Palermo called Passo di Rigano. He was indicted and arrested on February 7, 2008, in Operation Old Bridge against the Gambinos in New York and their connections in Palermo, involved in drug trafficking.
