= Gregory DePalma =

American mobster (1932–2009)

Gregory J DePalma
- DePalma‘s mugshot
- Born: Gregory J. DePalma; April 24, 1932
- Died: November 18, 2009 (aged 77); Butner, North Carolina, U.S.

Gregory J. DePalma (April 24, 1932 – November 18, 2009) was an American mobster who became a caporegime in the Gambino crime family. He became notorious as the person responsible for introducing and allowing "Jack Falcone" who in actuality was Joaquín "Jack" García an undercover Federal Bureau of Investigation (FBI) agent in his crew.

== Celebrity life ==
In the 1970s, DePalma became friends with numerous celebrities after he built the Westchester Premiere Theatre in Tarrytown, New York. These friends included singers Liza Minnelli and Dean Martin, and baseball player Willie Mays, with whom DePalma frequently played golf. However, DePalma's most prestigious friend was singer Frank Sinatra. In 1976, DePalma appeared in a famous group picture at the Theatre with Sinatra, then Gambino boss Carlo Gambino, future boss Paul Castellano, other Gambino mobsters, and L.A. acting mob boss Jimmy Fratianno. As soon as the theatre opened, DePalma and other mobsters started looting its cash and other assets. In 1977, DePalma became a made man in the Gambino crime family.

On June 6, 1978, DePalma was indicted on state charges regarding the theatre's financial collapse. However, the first trial ended in a hung jury. Later in 1979, before the second trial, DePalma pleaded guilty to bankruptcy fraud; one piece of evidence that helped the prosecution case was the picture with Sinatra. DePalma was sentenced to four years in prison. In the 1990s, DePalma was named a caporegime (captain). According to the FBI, he also visited imprisoned boss John Gotti while Gotti was incarcerated in 2001.

== Scores conviction ==
In January 1999, both DePalma and son Craig pleaded guilty to racketeering charges. The charges were based on the Gambino takeover and extortion of Scores, a famous strip club in Manhattan. As with the Westchester Theatre, the Gambino plan was to drain the cash from Scores and then get out. On June 13, 1999, a federal judge sentenced DePalma to 70 months in federal prison, a light sentence due to DePalma's claims of poor health. The sentencing took place in DePalma's hospital room at Westchester Medical Center in Valhalla, New York. Later that day, the same judge sentenced Craig in court to 87 months in federal prison. In 2002, while still in prison, Craig attempted to hang himself and was left in a persistent vegetative state. He died in December 2010.

== Jack Falcone ==
In 2003, a new mob associate, Jack Falcone (FBI special agent Joaquín García), got close to DePalma. Over the next year, Falcone provided DePalma with a steady stream of excellent quality stolen goods. By August 2004, García claims DePalma considered nominating him for induction into the Gambino family. DePalma did not realize that Falcone was actually Joaquín "Jack" García, and the FBI was providing the goods. For two years, García listened in (wearing a recording device) on conversations DePalma had with many mobsters in the Gambino family.

On February 21, 2005, DePalma, García, and another mobster Robert Vaccaro were meeting with Peter "Petey Chops" Vicini in the housewares section of a Bloomingdales department store in Westchester County. When Vicini failed to show them proper respect, Vaccaro grabbed a solid crystal candle holder and began beating him on the head. García convinced Vaccaro to stop beating Vicini and leave Bloomingdale's.

== Prison ==
On March 9, 2005, Garcia's undercover assignment ended as FBI agents arrested DePalma and 32 other Gambino mobsters on racketeering charges. By May 2006, DePalma's health was again in decline. He had spent most of the past year in the hospital, had a cancerous lung removed, and had suffered a heart attack. DePalma was morbidly obese and taking 20 medications a day. However, the judge ruled that he was healthy enough to stand trial.

On November 18, 2009, DePalma died at age 77 in the Federal Medical Center in Butner, North Carolina.
