= Joseph Corozzo =

American mobster (1942–2024)

- Born: October 1, 1942; New York City, U.S.
- Died: December 4, 2024 (aged 82); New York City, U.S.
- Other name: "JoJo"
- Occupation: Mobster
- Relatives: Nicholas Corozzo (brother)
- Allegiance: Gambino crime family
- Penalty: Three years' imprisonment (1995); 46 months' imprisonment (2008); Five years' imprisonment (2012)

Joseph "JoJo" Corozzo, Sr. (October 1, 1942 – December 4, 2024) was an American mobster who was the reputed consigliere of the Gambino crime family of New York.

== Biography ==
=== Background ===
Corozzo was born in Brownsville, Brooklyn. His brother Nicholas "Little Nick" Corozzo was the alleged one time boss of the Gambino crime family. Joseph has two other brothers: Blaise Corozzo, an alleged Gambino soldier, and Anthony Corozzo, an alleged Gambino associate. Joseph Corozzo is the father of New York criminal attorney Joseph Corozzo, Jr.

=== From capo to consigliere ===
Joseph Corozzo, Sr. started with the Gambino family as a transport truck hijacker. Corozzo earned the nickname "Miserable" because he allegedly has bipolar disorder. In 1971, Corozzo was jailed for contempt of court for refusing to answer grand jury questions about organized crime.

In 1992, during the Racketeer Influenced and Corrupt Organizations Act trial of Gambino family boss John Gotti, the Federal Bureau of Investigation (FBI) as a result of Salvatore Gravano’s testimony – identified Corozzo as an important Gambino caporegime. In 1992, Corozzo became the Gambino consigliere. He replaced Frank Locascio, who had been sentenced to life in prison that year.

On November 24, 1992, Corozzo was indicted in New York on charges of running a hijacking crew, a horse race betting establishment, and a loansharking operation. On May 30, 1994, Corozzo was indicted in New Orleans on racketeering charges involving mob infiltration of the video poker game industry in Louisiana.

On May 20, 1995, Corozo was acquitted of all charges in the New York trial. On September 8, 1995, Corozzo pleaded guilty to conspiracy counts in New Orleans as part of a plea bargain deal. Corozzo was sentenced in New Orleans to three years in federal prison at the Federal Prison Camp Montgomery, Maxwell AFB, AL.

In 2003, "Ruling Panel" member Michael "Mikey Scars" DiLeonardo testified that Arnold "Zeke" Squitieri was Gambino underboss and that John "Jackie Nose" D'Amico and Nicholas Corozzo ran the day-to-day family operations. Joseph Corozzo was the final decision-maker. DiLeonardo also stated that these men have controlled the Gambino family since the 1990s.

=== Prison and death ===
On February 7, 2008, Corozzo was indicted as part of Operation Old Bridge, a massive push against the Gambino family. The charges included numerous drug charges and charges of extorting payments from a Staten Island trucking company owned by businessman Joseph Vollaro. On June 5, 2008, in a plea bargain deal, the government dropped all drug charges against Corozzo and he pleaded guilty to racketeering conspiracy. Joseph received 46 months in federal prison, the low end of the sentencing guidelines.

On January 1, 2011, five months before his scheduled release date, Joseph was indicted again as part of an FBI operation against over 100 alleged Mafia members and associates. His specific charges included distributing cocaine, marijuana, and ecstasy. On September 19, 2012, Corozzo was sentenced to five years in federal prison.

Corozzo was imprisoned at the low security Federal Correctional Institution, Fort Dix in New Jersey. In October 2015, Corozzo was transferred to a reentry center in Brooklyn. He was released from custody on January 5, 2016.

Corozzo died on December 4, 2024, at the age of 82.

American Mafia
Preceded by Frank "Frankie Loc" LoCascio	Gambino crime family Consigliere; 1992–2011	Bartolomeo "Bobby Glasses" Vernace
