= Anthony Spero =

American mobster (1929–2008)

- Born: February 18, 1929; Brooklyn, New York, U.S.
- Died: September 29, 2008 (aged 79); Federal Correctional Complex, Butner, North Carolina, U.S.
- Resting place: Cemetery of the Resurrection; Staten Island, New York
- Other name: "Old Man"
- Occupation: Consigliere
- Children: 2
- Allegiance: Bonanno crime family
- Convictions: Extortion (1995); Murder, racketeering, conspiracy, illegal gambling, loan sharking (2001)
- Penalty: Two years' imprisonment (1995); Life Imprisonment and fined $250,000 (2002)

Anthony "Old Man" Spero (February 18, 1929 – September 29, 2008) was an Italian-American mobster who rose to the position of consigliere and acting boss of the Bonanno crime family.

== Biography ==
"Spero was a large man with dark hair, a dark complexion and was good looking in a rough way" Philip Carlo wrote. "He was fair, smart, and exceedingly well versed in the ways of the street". According to the testimony of boss-turned-informant Joe Massino, Anthony Spero was inducted into the Bonanno crime family by Carmine Galante on June 14, 1977. The ceremony was held in a Queens bar, and among those inducted were Massino, Joseph Chilli, Jr., Peter Monteleone and several other men.

A reserved and low-profile man, Spero's hobby was breeding racing pigeons in coops on the roof of a Bensonhurst building. To avoid electronic surveillance from law enforcement, Spero sometimes held crew meetings on the same rooftop. Spero was married with two daughters, Jill and Diana, and owned a home in Staten Island.

One of Spero's most lucrative enterprises was selling stolen fireworks. He owned huge warehouses of fireworks and made close to $5 million a year selling them. Every Fourth of July, Spero would stage a fireworks display on Bath Avenue in Bath Beach, Brooklyn that allegedly cost him several hundred thousand dollars. For these parties, Spero also supplied food that was said to be enough to feed all of Bensonhurst, Brooklyn. Spero was a close associate of Colombo crime family capo Gregory Scarpa and Lucchese crime family capo and future underboss Anthony Casso. Following the death of Alphonse Indelicato and the indictment of his son Anthony Indelicato, Bonanno mobster Thomas Pitera became close to Spero. Spero later inducted Pitera into the Bonanno crime family at an initiation ceremony at the house of Bonanno capo Frank Lino.

== Murders ==
In 1990, Spero ordered the murder of Louis Tuzzio, a Bonanno associate who had botched a mob killing. An ambitious gangster, Tuzzio had offended Spero by demanding to become a made man. In January 1990, Tuzzio was found dead in his car in Brooklyn with a bullet wound in the back of the head. In 1991, Spero ordered the murder of Vincent Bickelman, a burglar from Brooklyn. In August 1991, Bickelman had broken into the home of Spero's daughter Jill and stolen her jewelry and a fur coat. On September 15, 1991, Bickelman's body, with six bullet wounds, was discovered near his apartment in Bath Beach. Bickelman was allegedly murdered by Bonanno associate Paul Gulino, an ambitious young mobster who ran the Bath Avenue Crew.

In 1993, Spero ordered Gulino's murder. In July that year, during an argument with Spero at the Bath Beach social club, Gulino made physical contact with the inducted member, a cardinal sin of Cosa Nostra protocol. Two weeks later, Gulino's parents discovered him shot to death in their kitchen.

== Convictions ==
On January 24, 1994, Spero was indicted on federal racketeering charges of extortion and murder. The indictment stated that Spero controlled a business that used extortion to place "Joker Poker" gambling machines in bars, social clubs, and other establishments around the city. Spero was also charged with the 1991 murder of Marc Goldberg, a rival in the illegal gambling business. In April 1995, Spero was acquitted of the Goldberg murder, but convicted of extortion. He was sentenced to two years in prison. In 1997, Spero was released from prison.

On May 30, 1999, Spero was indicted on federal racketeering charges that included loansharking and the Tuzzio, Bickelman and Gulino murders from the 1990s. Spero pleaded not guilty on all counts. Spero was released from jail and confined to his Staten Island house, wearing an electronic ankle bracelet. Assistant U.S. Attorney James Walden of the Eastern District of New York was the lead prosecutor in the case against Spero. During the trial, one of the witnesses testifying against Spero was Alphonse D'Arco, the former acting boss of the Lucchese crime family. D'Arco recounted a 1991 conversation in which Spero stated that family members of mob informants, including children, should be murdered in retaliation. On April 5, 2001, Spero was convicted of the three murders and other racketeering charges. On April 16, 2002, United States district judge Edward Korman sentenced Spero to life imprisonment and fined him $250,000. His lawyer requested leniency due to Spero's poor health, but the judge denied the request.

On September 29, 2008, Spero died at the age of 79 at the Federal Correctional Complex, Butner (FCC) in Butner, North Carolina. Spero's body was interred at the Cemetery of the Resurrection in Staten Island, New York.

American Mafia
Preceded by Stefano "Stevie Beefs" Cannone	Bonanno crime family Consigliere; 1984–2001	Succeeded by Anthony "T.G." Graziano
Preceded by Philip "Rusty" Rastelli as boss	Bonanno crime family Acting boss 1987–1991	Succeeded by Joseph "Big Joe" Massino as boss
