= Domenico Cefalù =

Italian-American mobster

- Born: January 10, 1947 (age 79); Palermo, Sicily, Italy
- Other names: "Italian Dom", "Greaseball", "Dom from 18th Avenue"
- Occupation: Crime boss
- Predecessor: Peter Gotti
- Allegiance: Gambino crime family
- Convictions: Drug smuggling (1982); Contempt (1996); Racketeering conspiracy and extortion (2008)
- Penalty: Six years' imprisonment 33 months' imprisonment Two years' imprisonment

Domenico Cefalù (Italian pronunciation: [doˈmeːniko tʃefaˈlu]; born January 10, 1947) is an Italian-American mobster and is currently the boss of the Gambino crime family in New York City, since July 2011.

== Biography ==
Cefalù was born in Palermo, Sicily, in 1947. After moving to the United States, Cefalù became involved in organized crime and started smuggling heroin for the Gambino crime family. In March 1982, Cefalù was convicted of heroin smuggling along with 10 other men, including his uncle and cousin, and served six years in prison. In 1990, Gambino boss John Gotti inducted Cefalù as a made man, or full member, into the Gambino family. Cefalù was a member of the Sicilian "Zip" crew headed by captain Pasquale Conte and operated in Queens and Brooklyn.

In 1992, a New York grand jury summoned Cefalù to testify in an investigation of Conte. After answering a few questions, Cefalù refused to testify. The judge sentenced Cefalù to 18 months in jail for civil contempt. On February 23, 1993, Cefalù was summoned to testify in Conte's trial, but again refused. On February 6, 1994, Cefalù was released from jail. However, on February 6, 1994, Cefalù was indicted on criminal contempt for refusing to testify at Conte's trial. In 1996, convicted of criminal contempt, the court sentenced Cefalù to 33 months in prison.

In 2005, Cefalù was named family underboss by street boss and former ally of John Gotti, Jackie D'Amico. One of his main responsibilities was overseeing the Sicilian faction of the Gambino family.

On February 7, 2008, Cefalù was indicted on multiple charges of racketeering conspiracy and extortion as part of the Operation Old Bridge investigation of the Gambino family. The extortion charges came from the trucking industry, which hauls away dirt excavated from construction projects. He accepted a plea agreement from the prosecution in exchange for a guilty plea that could have resulted in his spending up to three years in prison. He was sentenced to two years in prison and was released on November 3, 2009.

In July 2011, he became the official boss of the Gambino crime family. His ascension was seen as a return to the old-fashioned way of running a Mafia family. He replaced Peter Gotti, who had been sentenced to prison in 2002 while a series of acting bosses and ruling panels was used to run the family. This also marked the end of the Gotti era of the Gambino family as since 1985 a Gotti family member had either held the position of official boss or acting boss.

American Mafia
Preceded by Jackie D'Amico as acting boss	Gambino crime family Boss; 2011–present	Succeeded by Frank Cali as acting boss
