= Joseph Vollaro =

American mobster

- Born: 1966 (age 59–60)
- Status: In witness protection
- Other names: Joey V Joe Andrews
- Parent: Anthony Vollaro
- Allegiance: Gambino crime family (formerly)
- Criminal charges: Drug dealing, loansharking

Joseph Vollaro (born 1966), also known as "Joey V" and "Joe Andrews", is a Staten Island-based American trucking executive and Gambino crime family associate who is now a government informant and witness.

Vollaro did construction work and worked in several gyms as a young man. Vollaro became an associate of the Gambino family in the 1990s. Vollaro's father, Anthony Vollaro, was a Gambino bookmaker operating in New Jersey. It was rumored that Vollaro was up for induction into the family in the mid-1990s before being sent to prison on drug dealing and loansharking charges.

== Mob connections ==
While in prison, Vollaro shared a cell with Gambino family mobster Nicholas "Little Nick" Corozzo. Vollaro became close to Corozzo, and when released from prison, Vollaro started making payments to Corozzo and his brother Joseph "Jo Jo" Corozzo. Vollaro's company, Andrews Trucking, quickly became one of the city's leading construction truckers, hauling dirt from the city's excavation sites. Vollaro and Gambino soldier Joseph Spinnato co-owned several Staten Island businesses which they used to produce money for the Gambinos, and to extort other business owners. Vollaro was responsible for getting the Gambino family involved in a NASCAR speedway that was planned for Staten Island; Andrews Trucking received a lucrative hauling contract at the site. Vollaro and the Gambinos soon came to dominate the construction business in Staten Island. At one point, the wealthy Vollaro owned three 40-foot yachts named "No Limits", "Cat in the Act", and "All Fired Up".

== Government informant ==
In 2004, Vollaro was arrested with two kilograms of cocaine and charged with heading a large-scale narcotics trafficking operation. Facing a lifetime prison term, Vollaro chose to become a government witness for the U. S. Department of Labor-OIG, Office of Labor Racketeering and Fraud Investigations, and assist in an investigation into the stronghold the Organized Crime had over the construction industry. Vollaro quickly rose to one of Nick Corozzo's trusted aides and was even planning to propose Vollaro for induction into the family as a made man or soldier.

In early 2008, Vollaro's work resulted in a massive federal Racketeer Influenced and Corrupt Organizations Act (RICO) indictment that snagged both Corozzo brothers, acting boss John "Jackie Nose" D'Amico, underboss Domenico Cefalu, capo Frank Cali, and over 40 capos, soldiers, and associates. However, the racketeering cases were weak and the government was forced to accept lesser plea bargain deals from the plaintiffs for extorting payments from Vollaro's business.

== Current status ==
Vollaro is currently part of the federal Witness Protection Program. In October 2008, Vollaro started legal proceedings for $600,000 in financial restitution from the Corozzos and other Gambino family members for extorting his business.
