= Jackie D'Amico =

American mobster (1936–2023)

- Born: John D'Amico; July 11, 1936
- Died: December 27, 2023 (aged 87)
- Other names: Jackie; The Nose
- Citizenship: American
- Occupation: Mobster
- Allegiance: Gambino crime family

John "Jackie" D'Amico (July 11, 1936 – December 27, 2023) was an American mobster and caporegime in New York City who served as street boss of the Gambino crime family from 2005 to 2011. "Street boss" had been the family's number one position ever since official boss Peter Gotti started serving a life sentence in prison.

== Early life ==
His parents were born in the village of Vietri sul Mare in the Campania region of Italy. D'Amico is not related to Bonanno crime family soldier Joseph D'Amico.

D'Amico received the nickname "Nose" because of his "Romanesque nose", one mob informant told the courts during his testimony. At the Gotti trial, mobster Michael “Mikey Scars” DiLeonardo said, "[D'Amico] had his nose fixed, a (rhinoplasty). He had a big, distorted nose at one time", D'Amico was said to have been upset with prosecutors for using the nickname.

D'Amico was an old friend of Irving "Hal" Hershkowitz, the founder and president of the non-alcoholic beverage corporation Big Geyser, Incorporated, He worked in their Maspeth, Queens warehouse. He maintained the job until he was brought to trial and convicted of extortion. He started as a delivery truck driver with a base salary of $23,000 but later switched to working as a salesman on commission and his salary was raised to $71,000 a year. At the same warehouse where D'Amico had an office block, he was a co-worker of Lucchese crime family capo Matthew Madonna who is also listed on the company payroll. Assistant U.S. Attorney Roger Burlingame suspected that while ostensibly on the payroll, D'Amico was given a no-show job allowing him to collect health benefits from the company, a Jaguar that was leased by the company, and to claim lawful employment. Herskowitz stated to reporter Tom Robbins that he had known D'Amico for thirty years and considered him a good, long-time friend. Hershkowitz and D'Amico attended New Utrecht High School together, the same high school that Sammy Gravano attended before dropping out.

== Rise to power ==
By the late 1960s, D'Amico was a bookmaker and soldier in the Gambino family, then ruled by boss Carlo Gambino. In the 1970s, D'Amico became an associate of Ozone Park, Queens-based capo John Gotti. In 1976, D'Amico began operating loansharking, illegal gambling, extortion and labor racketeering activities in Brooklyn, Queens and the Bronx. After Gambino died in 1976, his brother-in-law Paul Castellano became the new boss. During the late 1970s, D'Amico was promoted to caporegime in the Brooklyn faction. With income from loansharking, extortion, and illegal gambling operations, D'Amico gained much respect within the family

On December 16, 1985, Castellano and his underboss Thomas Bilotti were gunned down outside the Sparks Steak House in Manhattan. Gotti, who had orchestrated their assassination, now became the Gambino boss. D'Amico became one of Gotti's closest associates. In 1992, Gotti was convicted on racketeering charges and sentenced to life imprisonment.

When John Gotti went to prison, he created a ruling panel, or "administration", to supervise the family. This panel included D'Amico, Gotti's son John "Junior" Gotti as acting boss, Peter Gotti, and Joseph Arcuri. The four men would meet to discuss business at Hawaiian Moonlighters Club, the new Gambino headquarters in Little Italy. Other accounts state that Nicholas Corozzo, not Arcuri, was on the panel. After federal law enforcement began focusing on Junior Gotti, John Gotti allegedly designated him as the new acting boss.

In 1998, D'Amico was charged with racketeering and loansharking. On January 19, 1999, he pleading guilty to a single count of operating an illegal gambling operation in Connecticut whose profits went to Junior Gotti. On July 8, 1999, D'Amico was sentenced to 20 months in prison.

== Release from prison ==
In September 2001, D'Amico was released from prison. According to federal authorities, D'Amico became the Gambino acting boss in 2003. However, with the 2006 release of Nicholas Corozzo, a report stated that both D'Amico and Corozzo were running the family, with Arnold "Zeke" Squitieri as underboss and Joseph "Jo Jo" Corozzo as consigliere.

On February 7, 2008, D'Amico was arrested along with more than 60 affiliates of the Gambino family after Operation Old Bridge picked up an informant named Joseph Vollaro. The operation went on to terminate the drug trafficking between the Gambino crime family in New York and their connections in Sicily. While D'Amico was placed at the Metropolitan Detention Center (MDC) in Brooklyn, Corozzo became a fugitive. On March 14, 2008, D'Amico was released on bail from the Metropolitan Detention Center (MDC) in Brooklyn, New York. Following the indictments from Operation Old Bridge, D'Amico was still on trial regarding multiple counts of racketeering charges. In May, 2008, D'Amico pleaded guilty to extorting a cement company out of $100,000 and was sentenced on August 18, 2008, to two years in prison at the Metropolitan Correctional Center, New York City.

D'Amico had been scheduled for release from prison on November 3, 2009. However, in February 2009, the imprisoned D'Amico was charged with arranging the 1989 Weiss murder and was kept in prison. On August 5, 2010, D'Amico pleaded guilty to conspiring to assault Frederick Weiss with a dangerous weapon. The district attorney agreed to a lenient plea agreement because the case against D'Amico was "very, very weak". D'Amico was incarcerated at the Metropolitan Correctional Center, New York City and was released on June 15, 2012.

D'Amico died on December 27, 2023, at the age of 87.

American Mafia
Preceded by Anthony Megale as acting underboss	Gambino crime family Street boss 2005–2023	Succeeded by
