= Arnold Squitieri =

American mobster (1936–2022)

- Born: Arnold Ezekiel Squitieri; February 2, 1936; Englewood Cliffs, New Jersey, U.S.
- Died: January 27, 2022 (aged 85); Englewood Cliffs, New Jersey, U.S.

Arnold Ezekiel "Zeke" Squitieri (February 2, 1936 – January 27, 2022) was an American former acting boss and underboss of the Gambino crime family. He was also known as "Zeke", "Bozey", and "Squitty".

== Biography ==
=== Murder charge ===
On August 18, 1970, Squitieri shot garment cutter Desiderio Caban five times on a street in East Harlem. Two New York Police Department (NYPD) officers heard the shots, chased Squitieri by car for six blocks, until Squitieri finally stopped. Getting out of his car, Squitieri approached the officers and told them:

Don't worry about it, he's only shot in the arm. Let me go; the boys will take care of you.

A week later mobster Alphonse Sisca met with one of the officers and offered a $5,000 bribe to the policemen. They accepted the deal and removed Squitieri's name from the crime report for the Caban killing. Later on, after the bribery was discovered, the officers were indicted and Squitieri became a fugitive from justice. In January 1972, Squitieri surrendered to authorities.

In 1973, while awaiting trial for the Caban murder, Squitieri and his wife Marie were charged with failing to file U.S. federal income tax returns for three years. The couple had concealed $200,000 in income in bank accounts under false names. For the tax charges, Squitieri would serve four years in prison.

On March 14, 1973, Squitieri pleaded guilty to first degree manslaughter in the 1970 Caban murder. Squitieri was later sentenced to eight years in state prison.

=== After prison release ===
In May 1981, Squitieri was released from prison and soon began selling narcotics for the Gotti crew in New Jersey. In 1982, Squitieri was being supplied with heroin by Angelo Ruggiero and Gene Gotti. In 1986, after John Gotti replaced Paul Castellano as Gambino boss, Squitieri was inducted into the family.

In 1988, Squitieri was convicted in Camden, New Jersey of conspiring to distribute heroin and was sentenced to more than 11 years in prison. In 1999, boss John Gotti promoted Squitieri to underboss. On March 13, 1999, Squitieri was released from prison. In 2002, after the arrest of Gambino acting boss Peter Gotti, Squitieri became the new acting boss.

While on parole from prison, Squitieri received a flat-panel television as a gift from undercover FBI agent Joaquín "Jack" García. One evening, Squitieri was watching the famous TV series about the New Jersey mob, The Sopranos (in the episode, All Happy Families). On the show, family boss Anthony Soprano wants to have Feech La Manna returned to prison. To do this, Tony has Christopher Moltisanti and Benny Fazio give Feech a stolen TV set. Soprano then arranges for a parole officer to visit Feech and arrest him for possessing stolen property. When the show was over, a frightened Squitieri gave away the TV and purchased his own.

=== Confrontation with Rudaj ===
During the early and mid 2000s Squitieri had to contend with ethnic Albanian gangs’ involvement with the gambling rackets in Queens. One particular threat was with the Rudaj Organization (or "The Corporation"), run by mobster Alex Rudaj. At first, Gregory DePalma was able to solve minor disputes, but the Corporation became less cooperative over time.

In September 2005, Squitieri arranged a meeting with Rudaj at a gas station in New Jersey. When the Corporation mobsters arrived, 20 armed Gambino men confronted them. FBI undercover agent known as Jack Falcone stated in his book that Squitieri told the Corporation mobsters, "You took what you took and that's it or there's gonna be a problem." The Gambinos outnumbered the Corporation 20 to 6. Rudaj ordered one of his men to shoot a gas tank if a gunfight ensued. Rudaj eventually listened to advice and stopped interfering with Gambino operations.

=== Return to prison ===
On March 9, 2005, Squitieri was arrested on charges of extorting money from construction companies in Westchester County, New York, Mineola, New York, and New Jersey. On June 15, a tearful Squitieri pleaded guilty to conducting an illegal gambling operation and to tax evasion. On June 28, 2006 Squitieri was sentenced to just over seven years in federal prison.

Squitieri was incarcerated at the Devens Federal Medical Center (FMC) in Massachusetts. He was released on December 7, 2012.

Squitieri died on January 27, 2022, aged 85.

American Mafia
| Preceded by Salvatore "Sammy the Bull" Gravano | Gambino crime family Underboss; 1999–2012 | Succeeded by Frank Cali |
| Preceded by Peter Gotti | Gambino crime family Acting boss 2002–2005 | Succeeded by Nicholas "Little Nick" Corozzo |
