= Salvatore Inzerillo =

Sicilian Mafia Boss (1944–1981)

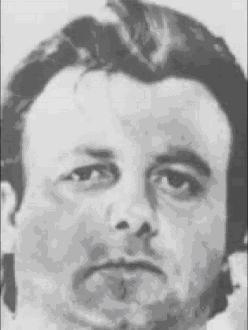
- Born: 20 August 1944; Palermo, Sicily, Italy
- Died: 11 May 1981 (aged 36); Palermo, Sicily, Italy
- Cause of death: Gunshots
- Other name: "Totuccio"
- Children: Giuseppe and Giovanni Inzerillo
- Allegiance: Passo di Rigano Mafia family

Salvatore Inzerillo (Italian pronunciation: [salvaˈtoːre indzeˈrillo]; 20 August 1944 – 11 May 1981) was an Italian member of the Sicilian Mafia, also known as Totuccio (a diminutive for Salvatore). He rose to be a powerful boss of Palermo's Passo di Rigano family. A prolific heroin trafficker, he was killed in May 1981 during the Second Mafia War by a assassin squad of the Corleonesi led by Totò Riina, who opposed the established Palermo Mafia families of which Inzerillo was one of the main proponents.

== Early life ==
Inzerillo was born in Palermo. He married his cousin, Giuseppa Di Maggio, the daughter of his mother's brother, Rosario Di Maggio – the boss of the Passo di Rigano Mafia family. Through a string of marriages, the Inzerillos were related to the Di Maggio and Spatola families in Palermo and the Gambinos in New York. He had two sons, Giuseppe and Giovanni.

Inzerillo was a close ally of Stefano Bontade and Gaetano Badalamenti and a relative of the New York City Mafia boss Carlo Gambino. He became a member of the Sicilian Mafia Commission in 1978, succeeding his uncle Rosario Di Maggio, and formed a strong alliance with Bontade against the growing power of Totò Riina and the Corleonesi who were increasingly challenging the established Mafia families of Palermo.

== Killed in the Second Mafia War ==
Salvatore Inzerillo ordered the killing of prosecuting judge Gaetano Costa who signed the 53 arrest warrants against the Spatola-Inzerillo-Gambino clan and their heroin-trafficking network in May 1980. Costa was murdered on 6 August 1980 by a gunman who escaped on a motorcycle driven by an accomplice. Inzerillo acted without asking permission from the Mafia Commission to prove he could commit a murder in rival territory (that of Giuseppe Calò) just as the Corleonesi. On 11 May 1981, Inzerillo was shot to death after leaving his mistress' house in Palermo. When he was about to get into his armoured Alfa Romeo Alfetta, from a parked Renault van (that was stolen the night before) driven by Giuseppe Marchese, Giuseppe Greco, Antonino Madonia and Giuseppe Giacomo Gambino (who was armed with an automatic Shotgun) opened fire through the windshield, killing him in a hail of bullets. For the murder the hitmen used an automatic Shotgun and two AK-47 rifles, the same type of assault rifle that was used the evening before to shoot at the windows of a jewellery store in Palermo, to test the penetration power against the armoured glass of the shop, at the time the Kalashnikov wasn't commonly used among criminals and it was difficult to obtain from common arms smugglers. It was used three weeks before by Giuseppe Greco to murder Stefano Bontade. The deaths of these two bosses started the Second Mafia War that lasted three years and saw hundreds of mafiosi killed as Toto Riina and the Corleonesi decimated their rivals in order to take over Cosa Nostra by sheer brute force. At Inzerillo's funeral, his teenage son Giuseppe vowed to avenge his father, and not long after, most probably in June 1981, the boy was kidnapped, tortured and killed. A number of informants, including Tommaso Buscetta, said that it was Giuseppe Greco who abducted the youth and shot him through the head, after he hacked his arm off with a machete symbolically removing the arm the youngster had vowed to shoot Riina with.

Santo Inzerillo, the brother of Salvatore, was strangled on 26 May 1981, when he came to a meeting to ask for clarifications about the killing of his relatives. One of the other brothers, Pietro Inzerillo subsequently turned up murdered in New Jersey, in January 1982.

== Sources ==
- Arlacchi, Pino (1988). Mafia Business. The Mafia Ethic and the Spirit of Capitalism, Oxford: Oxford University Press ISBN 0-19-285197-7
- Jamieson, Alison (2000), The Antimafia. Italy’s Fight Against Organized Crime, London: MacMillan Press ISBN 0-333-80158-X
- Paoli, Letizia (2003). Mafia Brotherhoods: Organized Crime, Italian Style, Oxford/New York: Oxford University Press ISBN 0-19-515724-9
- Shawcross, Tim & Martin Young (1987). Men Of Honour: The Confessions Of Tommaso Buscetta, Glasgow: Collins ISBN 0-00-217589-4
- Sterling, Claire (1990), Octopus. How the long reach of the Sicilian Mafia controls the global narcotics trade, New York: Simon & Schuster, ISBN 0-671-73402-4
- Stille, Alexander (1995). Excellent Cadavers. The Mafia and the Death of the First Italian Republic, New York: Vintage ISBN 0-09-959491-9
