= Mormando =

Mormando is a surname. Notable people with the surname include:

- Franco Mormando (born 1955), Italian historian, university professor, and author
- Giovanni Francesco Mormando (1449–1530), Italian architect
- Nicholas Mormando (1944–1985), American mobster
- Robert Mormando, American mobster
- Steve Mormando (born 1955), American fencer
