= Primo Cassarino =

American mobster

- Born: April 26, 1956 (age 70); Dyker Heights, Brooklyn, U.S.

Primo Cassarino (born April 26, 1956) is a New York mobster who became an enforcer for Gambino crime family, and extorted money from actor Steven Seagal.

== Foulest mouth in Brooklyn ==
Born in 1956 to first generation immigrants from Sicily, Italy, Cassarino was the son of a longshoreman. His cousin is Gambino soldier Mario Cassarino. As a young man, Primo Cassarino joined the Gambino family and eventually became a made man, or full member. Cassarino belonged to Gambino capo Anthony "Sonny" Ciccone's crew, soon becoming the leading "bagman" and extortionist on the Staten Island, New York waterfront. Cassarino's legitimate job was as a sanitation worker for the New York Department of Sanitation. In 1991, Cassarino was injured falling off a garbage truck. Over the next 15 years, he was involved in litigation with the City for a special disability pension.

Cassarino's own lawyer once observed that his client had "the foulest mouth in Brooklyn." At one point, law enforcement recorded Cassarino berating a debtor who was late on a loan payment:

a greaseball [bleeping bleep]. ... You're a greaseball no good [bleeper]. ... You're a [bleeping] slimy [bleeper]. ... You better hope I don't see your [bleeping] face . . .

In 1997, Ciccone started receiving extortion payments from Carmine Ragucci, a leader of the Conservative Party of New York State and a terminal owner. It quickly became Cassarino's job to transfer these payments from Ragucci to Ciccone.

In April 2001, Cassarino was tasked with delivering cash payments from Ciccone to Gambino boss Peter Gotti. The two mobsters would meet on a street in the Howard Beach neighborhood of Queens.

== Steven Seagal ==
In January 2001, Cassarino participated in an extortion attempt against actor Steven Seagal, who had recently terminated a business partnership with Julius R. Nasso, a Staten Island movie producer who was friends with Ciccone. Allegedly at Nasso's request, Cassarino and other crew members picked up Seagal by car to bring him to a meeting with Ciccone. Cassarino had these comments about Seagal refusing to sit in the front seat:

How the [expletive] do you put him in the back, he's six-foot-what, five? He didn't want nobody to shoot him in the [expletive] head. If he was sitting in the front, I'm right behind him.

At the meeting, Ciccone bluntly told Seagal that he had a choice of making four promised movies with Nasso or paying Nasso a penalty of $150,000 per movie. If Seagal refused, Ciccone would kill him. Seagal, who later claimed that he brought a handgun to the meeting, was able to stall Ciccone and escape the meeting unharmed.

== Conviction ==
On March 17, 2003, Cassarino, Peter Gotti, Ciccone, and Richard V. Gotti were convicted of labor racketeering, extortion, and 63 other counts under the Racketeer Influenced and Corrupt Organizations Act. Seagal testified for the prosecution about the mobsters' extortion attempt.

In August 2004, Cassarino received an 11½-year prison sentence. At his sentencing, Cassarino said that the mob life was finished. He begged his children to continue with their education and make decent lives for themselves. Soon after his sentencing, Cassarino became a government witness in hopes of reducing his sentence.

In 2005, Cassarino testified for the prosecution in the trial of Genovese crime family capo Lawrence Ricci.
