= Richard Martino =

American mobster

Richard Martino (born 1961) is a member of the New York Gambino crime family who was involved in Internet and phone scams that cost consumers $750 million. Martino introduced the Cosa Nostra into this area of crime.

== Biography ==
A major earner for the Gambino family, Martino owned expensive homes in Harrison, New York and Southampton, New York, wore Prada shoes, and drove a Mercedes-Benz car.

Martino and Gambino capo Salvatore LoCascio created what appeared to be a pornography website. Like many such sites, visitors could tour it for free by providing credit card numbers to confirm they were adults. This concept originated from a cousin of Martino's who had created a course for men, instructing them "how to pick up girls." However, Martino and LoCascio then charged the visitors an unauthorized monthly website subscription. This scam cost consumers approximately $230 million. In a different scam, Martino and Locascio created a "cramming" scheme that sent bills to customer phone companies for unwanted services costing them $420 million.

On March 18, 2003, Martino was charged in New York with federal racketeering fraud involving the website scam. On February 10, 2004, Martino was charged in New York in a second case with federal racketeering involving the phone scam. Finally, on January 25, 2005, Martino was charged in Kansas City, Missouri on federal charges of illegally obtaining subsidies from two federal programs.

On February 14, 2005, in a plea bargain that covered both New York cases, Martino pleaded guilty to one count of conspiracy and one count of extortion. On January 6, 2006, Martino was sentenced in Missouri to five years in prison and a $4.6 million fine. On January 30, 2006, Martino was sentenced in New York to nine years in federal prison.

Martino was released from federal prison on July 15, 2014.
