= Mannino =

Mannino is an Italian/Sicilian family name which originated in San Piero Patti in the Province of Messina in Sicily. People with the surname Mannino include:

- Calogero Mannino (born 1939), Italian politician and lawyer
- Franco Mannino (1924–2005), Italian film composer
- Jason Mannino (born 1975), American racquetball player
- Julio Mannino (born 1969), Mexican actor
- Lorenzo Mannino (born 1959), Italian-American crime boss
- Peter Mannino (born 1984), American hockey player
- Teresa Mannino (born 1970), Italian comedian and actress
- Daniele Luca Mannino (born 1974),Italian disc jockey
