= Rampino =

Rampino is a surname. Notable people with the surname include:

- Michael R. Rampino (born 1948), American geologist
- Rocco Rampino (born 1983), Italian DJ and producer Congorock
- Tony Rampino (1939–2010), American mobster
