= Anthony Megale =

American mobster

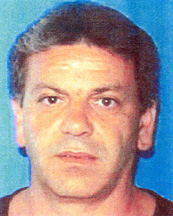
Federal Bureau of Investigation mugshot of Megale

Anthony Megale (August 1, 1953 – July 21, 2015), also known as "The Genius", was a mobster, caporegime and later acting underboss of the Gambino crime family. His base of operations was in southwest Connecticut.

== Criminal history ==
Allegedly born in Italy, Megale moved to Connecticut as a young man. Megale's residence was in Stamford, Connecticut. He married with a son and two daughters.

At some point, Megale joined the Gambino family. In 1982, Megale was convicted of a narcotics offense.

In 1990, Megale pleaded guilty to racketeering and was sentenced to six years in prison. Megale's plea deal included an admission that he belonged to a La Cosa Nostra family, which infuriated Gambino boss John Gotti. In 1995, Megale was released from prison on parole. However, in 1998 he returned to prison for 11 months for associating with other criminals, a parole violation.

In August 2001, Megale became a caporegime in the Gambino family for its Connecticut operations. Megale died in July, 2015, just 8 months after being released from prison.

== Extortion victims ==
In August 2002, Megale met with Harry Farrington, aka "Oil Can Harry" the owner of two strip clubs in Fairfield County, Connecticut, who was being extorted by mobsters from the Patriarca crime family of New England. Megale contacted the Patriarca mobsters and told them that Stamford was his territory and then proceeded to extort Farrington himself. In September 2002, Megale told Farrington that he would have to pay Megale $2,000 a month in "protection" money plus a yearly $3,000 "Christmas bonus." If the payments were late, Megale threatened Farrington with violence and property destruction. Farrington's response was to go to law enforcement, which set Farrington up with a listening device for future meetings with Megale. Between November 2002 and February 2004, Farrington made regular payments to Megale while recording their meetings.

In September 2002, Megale started extorting $200 a month from a vending machine operator who already been making payments to the Gambino family since 1996. During this period, Megale also extorted money from a construction company in Westchester County, New York, and a New Jersey trucking company.

== Connecticut and New York convictions ==
In September 2004, with evidence from Farrington, Megale was indicted in Connecticut on 38 extortion charges. In October 2005, Megale pleaded guilty to lesser charges and on April 3, 2006, was sentenced to 86 months in prison.

On March 31, 2006, Megale pleaded guilty to reduced charges in the New York case. On September 6, 2006, Megale was sentenced to more than 11 years in prison. Farrington sold his two clubs and moved out of state.

Megale served his sentence at the Allenwood Federal Correctional Institution (FCI) in Allenwood, Pennsylvania. On December 1, 2014, he was released from prison.

Megale died on July 21, 2015, at Stamford Hospital after suffering a heart attack.

American Mafia
Preceded by Arnold Squitieri as underboss	Gambino crime family Acting underboss 2002-2005	Succeeded by Domenico "Italian Dom" Cefalu
