= Joseph Juliano =

American mobster

Joseph "Sonny" Juliano (born 1938) is an American mobster and a reputed caporegime in the Gambino crime family of New York City.

== Criminal career ==
Juliano was born in New Utrecht, Brooklyn and is the brother of Gambino mobster Richard Juliano and the uncle or father of Richard J. Juliano. His relative Joseph Juliano was active during Prohibition, involved in hijacking bootleg alcohol in Passaic, New Jersey. Following Ruggerio Boiardo's release from New Jersey State Prison, Joseph was found shot on Harvey Street in Newark, New Jersey. Juliano survived but was not allowed to enter New Jersey's First Ward district neighborhood.

=== Investigations ===
Although it has not been confirmed when Juliano was inducted or promoted to the rank of capo in the Gambino crime family, the US law enforcement began a federal investigation of Juliano in the late 1990s, apparently recognizing him as a capo, commanding his own crew in the Brooklyn faction of the family. Federal authorities also began the basics for a possible indictment, whereas illegal gambling, loansharking, extortion, fraud and wire fraud were the possible charges.

=== Indictments ===
On January 29, 2003, Juliano was indicted in Albany, New York, on charges of managing and operating a multimillion-dollar illegal gambling racket, based in over 30 different locations in New York City. The 92 charges against the Juliano crew included loansharking, illegal gambling, conspiracy to oversee illegal gambling, fraud, wire fraud and tax evasion. Juliano employed over 90 "runners", including several retired men with thick glasses, noticeable limps and walking canes, to collect on the illegal bets.

On April 9, 2003, Juliano pleaded guilty to one count of attempted enterprise corruption. On October 10, 2003, he was sentenced to two to four years in state prison. The court also ordered Juliano to forfeit $550,000 in gambling proceeds to the state and pay $37,000 in back taxes.
