= Daniel Marino =

Italian-American mobster

- Born: October 7, 1940 (age 86); Brooklyn, New York, U.S.
- Other name: "Danny"
- Occupation: Mobster
- Allegiance: Gambino crime family
- Convictions: Racketeering and conspiracy to commit murder (1994); Racketeering, conspiracy, murder, sex trafficking, sex trafficking of a minor, jury tampering, extortion, assault, drug trafficking, wire fraud, loan sharking, illegal gambling (2011)
- Penalty: Seven years' imprisonment (1994); Five years' imprisonment (2011)

Daniel Marino (born October 7, 1940) is an Italian American mobster and member of the Gambino crime family. He was identified as a member of the family's leadership panel, alongside John Gambino and Bartolomeo Vernace, in 2009.

On June 23, 1963, Marino pleaded not guilty to assault. He and several cousins were charged with assaulting an FBI agent outside a Catholic church in Brooklyn. A requiem mass was being conducted at that time for Carmine Lombardozzi, a crime family figure and Marino's uncle.

On April 20, 1993, Marino was indicted with others on conspiracy to murder charges. The victim was Thomas Spinelli, who had been planning to testify before a grand jury on Cosa Nostra control of the private trash hauling industry in New York City.

In 1995, Anthony Casso, a Lucchese underboss who turned state's evidence, identified Marino as a co-conspirator in a failed assassination attempt on Gambino boss John Gotti.

In 2010, Marino pleaded guilty to a conspiracy charge for approving the murder of informant Frank Hydell (Marino's nephew on his wife's side). The Gambino family suspected that Hydell had become a government informant and requested permission from Marino, then in prison, to kill Hydell. Marino was sentenced to five years' imprisonment in 2011. He was released from prison on August 27, 2014.
