= Gambino crime family =

New York-based organized crime group

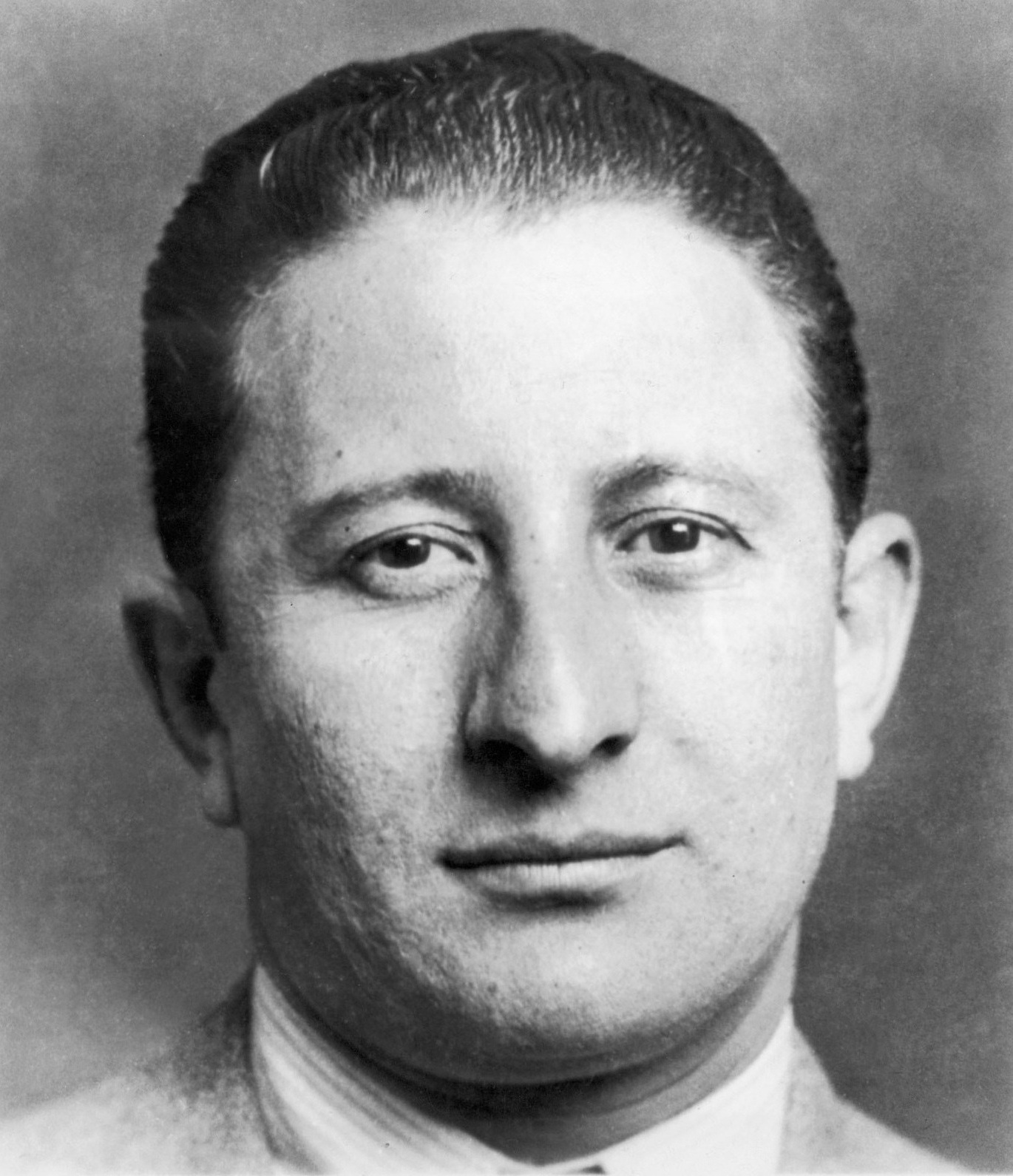
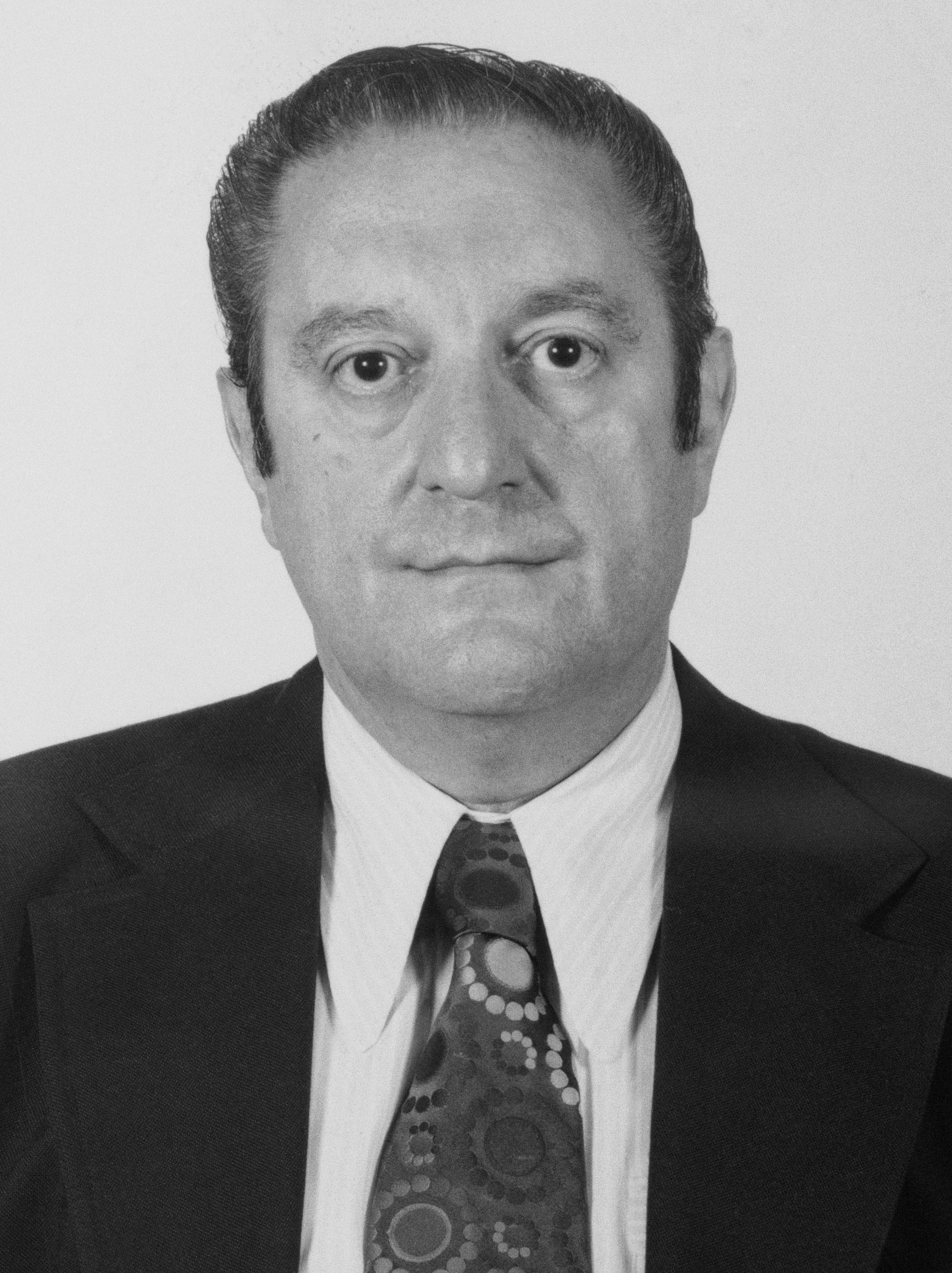
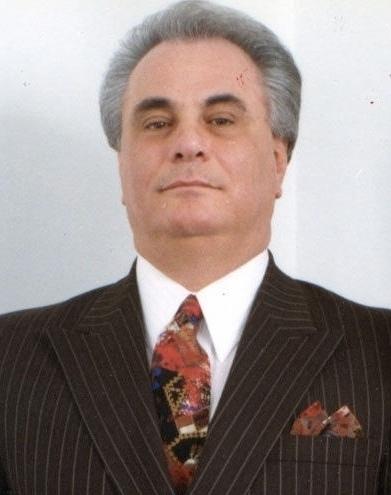
- Carlo Gambino Paul Castellano John Gotti
- Founded: c. 1900s
- Founder: Vincent Mangano
- Named after: Carlo Gambino
- Founding location: New York City, New York, United States
- Years active: c. 1900s–present
- Territory: Primarily the New York metropolitan area, including Long Island, Westchester County and New Jersey, with additional territory in Baltimore and Western Connecticut, as well as Atlanta, Las Vegas, Los Angeles, South Florida, Tampa and Palermo
- Ethnicity: Italians as "made men" and other ethnicities as associates
- Membership (est.): 800 made members and 1,400 associates (1973); 250 made members and 600 associates (1990); 150–200 made members and 1,500–2,000 associates (2004); 165 made members (2021)
- Activities: Racketeering, gambling, loansharking, extortion, labor racketeering, drug trafficking, firearms trafficking, robbery, truck hijacking, pier theft, auto theft, fencing, fraud, money laundering, waste dumping violations, prostitution, pornography, assault, and murder
- Allies: Bonanno crime family; Buffalo crime family; Casalesi clan; Chicago Outfit; Cleveland crime family; Colombo crime family; Corleonesi; DeCavalcante crime family; Detroit Partnership; Genovese crime family; Inzerillo Mafia clan; Los Angeles crime family; Lucchese crime family; New Orleans crime family; Patriarca crime family; Philadelphia crime family; Trafficante crime family; Aryan Brotherhood; Bloods; Crips; Group America; Hells Angels MC; Latin Kings; Mexican Mafia; Pagan's MC; Westies
- Rivals: Rudaj Organization; Velentzas Organization; and various other gangs in New York City, including their allies

The Gambino crime family (Italian: [ɡamˈbiːno]) is an Italian American Mafia crime family and one of the "Five Families" that dominate organized crime activities in New York City, within the nationwide criminal phenomenon known as the American Mafia. The group, which went through five bosses between 1910 and 1957, is named after Carlo Gambino, boss of the family at the time of the McClellan hearings in 1963, when the structure of organized crime first gained public attention. The group's operations extend from New York and the eastern seaboard to California. Its illicit activities include labor and construction racketeering, gambling, loansharking, extortion, money laundering, prostitution, fraud, hijacking, and fencing.

The family was one of the five families that were founded in New York after the Castellammarese War of 1931. For most of the next quarter-century, it was a minor player in organized crime. Its most prominent member during this time was its underboss Albert Anastasia, who rose to infamy as the operating head of the underworld's enforcement arm, Murder, Inc. He remained in power even after Murder, Inc. was smashed in the late 1940s, and took over his family in 1951—by all accounts, after murdering the family's founder Vincent Mangano—which was then recognized as the Anastasia crime family.

The rise of what was the most powerful crime family in America for a time began in 1957, when Anastasia was assassinated while sitting in a barber chair at the Park Sheraton Hotel in Manhattan, New York City. Some historians believe that Albert Anastasia's underboss Carlo Gambino helped orchestrate the hit to take over the family. Gambino partnered with Meyer Lansky to control gambling interests in Cuba and a few other places. The family's fortunes grew through 1976, when Gambino appointed his brother-in-law Paul Castellano as boss upon his death. Castellano infuriated upstart capo John Gotti, who orchestrated Castellano's murder in 1985. Gotti's downfall came in 1992, when his underboss Salvatore "Sammy the Bull" Gravano cooperated with the FBI. Gravano's cooperation with the U.S. government sent John Gotti and most of the top members of the Gambino family to prison. Following the Gotti regime, the control of the Gambino family was assumed by the organization's Sicilian faction. Beginning in 2015, the family was headed by Frank Cali until his assassination outside his Staten Island home on March 13, 2019.

== History ==
=== Origins ===
==== D'Aquila gang ====
The origins of the Gambino crime family can be traced back to the faction of newly transplanted mafiosi from Palermo, Sicily who were originally led by Ignazio Lupo. When he and his partner by business and marriage, Giuseppe Morello, were sent to prison for counterfeiting in 1910, Salvatore "Toto" D'Aquila, one of Lupo's chief captains, took over. D'Aquila was an influential emigrant from Palermo who joined the Lupo gang based in East Harlem. Founded in the 1900s, the Lupo Mano Nera gang was one of the first Italian criminal groups in New York. Lupo was partner in many ventures with Morello, who was the original capo di tutti capi (boss of bosses), a title that would later be coveted by D'Aquila. As other gangs formed in New York, they acknowledged Morello as their boss of bosses. In 1906, D'Aquila's name first appeared on police records for running a confidence scam.

In 1910, Giuseppe Morello and Ignazio Lupo were sentenced to 30 years in prison for counterfeiting. With the Morello family weakened, D'Aquila used the opportunity to establish the dominance of what was now his own Palermitani family in East Harlem. D'Aquila quickly used his ties to other Mafia leaders in the United States to create a network of influence and connections and was soon a powerful force in New York.

==== New York gangs ====
By 1910, more Italian gangs had formed in New York City. In addition to the original Morello gang in East Harlem and D'Aquila's own, now growing gang, also in East Harlem (but expanding into Little Italy in Manhattan's Lower East Side), there were other organizations forming. In Brooklyn, Nicolo "Cola" Schirò established a second gang of Sicilian mafiosi from Castellammare del Golfo, west of Palermo, in Sicily. A third Sicilian gang was formed by Alfred Mineo in Brooklyn. Another Morello captain, Gaetano Reina, had also broken away in the Bronx, ruling that area with impunity. In south Brooklyn, first Johnny Torrio, then Frankie Yale were leading a new and rising organization. Finally, there were two allied Neapolitan Camorra gangs, one on Coney Island and one on Navy Street in Brooklyn, that were run by Pellegrino Morano and Alessandro Vollero respectively.

In 1916 the Camorra had assassinated Nicholas Morello, head of the Morello gang. In response, D'Aquila allied with the Morellos to fight the Camorra. In 1917, both Morano and Vollero were convicted of murder and sentenced to life in prison. With their leadership gone, the two Camorra gangs disappeared and D'Aquila and the Schiro family in Brooklyn took over many of their rackets in Brooklyn. Soon after, D'Aquila absorbed the Mineo gang, making Mineo his first lieutenant. D'Aquila now controlled the largest and most influential Italian gang in New York City. It was about this time that Joe Masseria, another former Morello captain, began asserting his influence over the Lower East Side's Little Italy and began to come into conflict with D'Aquila's operations there, as Prohibition approached.

==== Prohibition ====
In 1920, the United States outlawed the production and sale of alcoholic beverages (Prohibition), creating the opportunity for an extremely lucrative illegal racket for the New York gangs.

By 1920, D'Aquila's only significant rival was Giuseppe "Joe the Boss" Masseria. Masseria had taken over the Morello family interests, and by the mid-1920s, had begun to amass power and influence to rival that of D'Aquila. By the late 1920s, D'Aquila and Masseria were headed for a showdown.

On October 10, 1928, Masseria gunmen assassinated Salvatore D'Aquila outside his home. D'Aquila's second-in-command, Alfred Mineo, and his right-hand man, Steve Ferrigno, now commanded the largest and most influential Sicilian gang in New York City.

==== Castellammarese War ====
In 1930, the Castellammarese War started between Masseria and Salvatore Maranzano, the new leader of Cola Schirò's Castellammarese gang, for control of Italian-American organized crime in New York. Mineo was a casualty; he and Ferrigno were shot dead during an assassination attempt on Masseria on November 5, 1930. In April 1931, Masseria was murdered in a restaurant by several of his gang members who had defected to Maranzano. Maranzano declared himself the boss of all bosses and reorganized all the New York gangs into five crime families. Maranzano appointed Frank Scalice as head of the old D'Aquila/Mineo gang, now designated as one of New York's new five families.

In September 1931, Maranzano was himself assassinated in his office by a squad of contract killers. The main beneficiary (and organizer of both hits) was Charlie "Lucky" Luciano. Luciano kept Maranzano's five families and added a Commission to mediate disputes and prevent more gang warfare.

Also in 1931, Luciano replaced Scalice with Vincent Mangano as head of the D'Aquila/Mineo gang, now the Mangano crime family. Mangano also received a seat on the new Commission. The modern era of the Cosa Nostra had begun.

=== Mangano era ===
Vincent Mangano now took over the family, with Joseph Biondo as consigliere and Albert Anastasia as underboss. Vincent Mangano still believed in the Old World mob traditions of "honor", "tradition", "respect" and "dignity". However, he was somewhat more forward-looking than either Masseria or Maranzano. To compensate for loss of massive revenues with the end of Prohibition in 1933, Vincent Mangano moved his family into extortion, union racketeering, and illegal gambling operations including horse betting, running numbers and lotteries.

Vincent Mangano also established the City Democratic Club, ostensibly to promote American values. In reality, the club was a cover for Murder, Inc., the notorious band of mainly Jewish hitmen who performed contract murders for the Cosa Nostra nationwide. Anastasia was the operating head of Murder, Inc.; he was popularly known as the "Lord High Executioner".

Vincent Mangano also had close ties with Emil Camarda, a vice-president of the International Longshoremen's Association (ILA). Through the ILA, Mangano and the family completely controlled the Manhattan and Brooklyn waterfronts. From 1932 onward, the president of ILA Local 1814 was Anthony "Tough Tony" Anastasio, Albert Anastasia's younger brother (Anthony kept the original spelling of their last name). Anastasio was one of the family's biggest earners, steering millions of dollars in kickbacks and payoffs into the family's coffers. Anastasio made no secret of his ties to the mob; he only had to say "my brother Albert" to get his point across. With the family's backing, the Brooklyn waterfront was Anastasio's bailiwick for 30 years.

Around this time, Carlo Gambino was promoted within the Mangano family, along with another future boss, Gambino's cousin Paul Castellano.

Anastasia and Mangano were usually in conflict, even though they worked together for 20 years. On numerous occasions, Anastasia and Vincent Mangano came close to physical conflict. Vincent Mangano felt uncomfortable with Anastasia's close ties to Lucky Luciano, Frank Costello, Joseph Bonanno and other top mobsters outside his family. Mangano was also jealous of Anastasia's strong power base in Murder Inc. and the waterfront unions.

In April 1951, Vincent Mangano disappeared without a trace, while his brother Phillip was found dead. No one was ever charged in the Mangano brothers' deaths and Vincent's body was never found. However, it is generally believed that Anastasia murdered both of them.

=== Anastasia regime ===
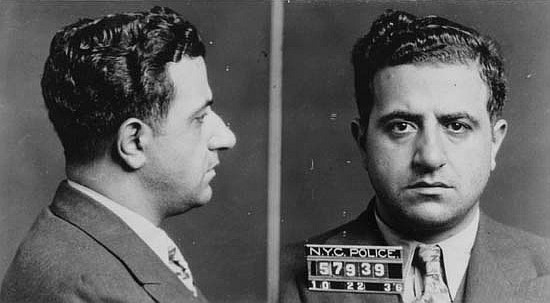
Mugshot of Albert Anastasia in 1936

Called to face the Commission, Anastasia refused to accept guilt for the Mangano murders. However, Anastasia did claim that Vincent Mangano had been planning to kill him. Anastasia was already running the family in Vincent Mangano's "absence" and the Commission members were intimidated by Anastasia. With the support of Frank Costello, boss of the Luciano crime family, the Commission confirmed Anastasia's ascension as boss of what was now the Anastasia crime family. Carlo Gambino, a wily character with designs on the leadership himself, maneuvered himself into the position of consigliere.

The former boss of Murder, Inc., Anastasia was a vicious murderer who inspired fear throughout the New York families. With Costello as an ally, Anastasia came to control the Commission. Costello's bitter rival was Vito Genovese, a former underboss for Lucky Luciano. Since 1946, Genovese had been scheming to remove Costello from power but was not powerful enough to face Anastasia.

==== Plot against Anastasia ====
Anastasia's own brutal actions soon created a favorable climate in New York for his removal. In 1952, Anastasia ordered the murder of a Brooklyn man, Arnold Schuster, who had aided in the capture of the bank robber Willie Sutton. Anastasia did not like the fact that Schuster had helped the police. The New York families were outraged by this gratuitous killing that raised a large amount of public furor. Anastasia also alienated one of Luciano's powerful associates, Meyer Lansky, by opening casinos in Cuba to compete with Lansky's. Genovese and Lansky soon recruited Carlo Gambino to the conspiracy by offering him the chance to replace Anastasia and become boss himself.

In May 1957, Frank Costello escaped a Genovese-organized murder attempt with a minor injury and decided to resign as boss. However, Genovese and Gambino soon learned that Costello was conspiring with Anastasia to regain power. They decided to kill Anastasia.

On October 25, 1957, several masked gunmen murdered Anastasia in the barbershop at the Park Sheraton Hotel in Manhattan. As Anastasia sat in the barber's chair, the three assailants rushed in, shoved the barber out of the way, and started shooting. The wounded Anastasia allegedly lunged at his killers, but only hit their reflections in the wall mirror. Anastasia died at the scene. Many historians believe that Gambino ordered caporegime Joseph Biondo to kill Anastasia and Biondo gave the contract to a squad of Gambino drug dealers led by Stephen Armone and Stephen Grammauta.

=== Gambino era ===
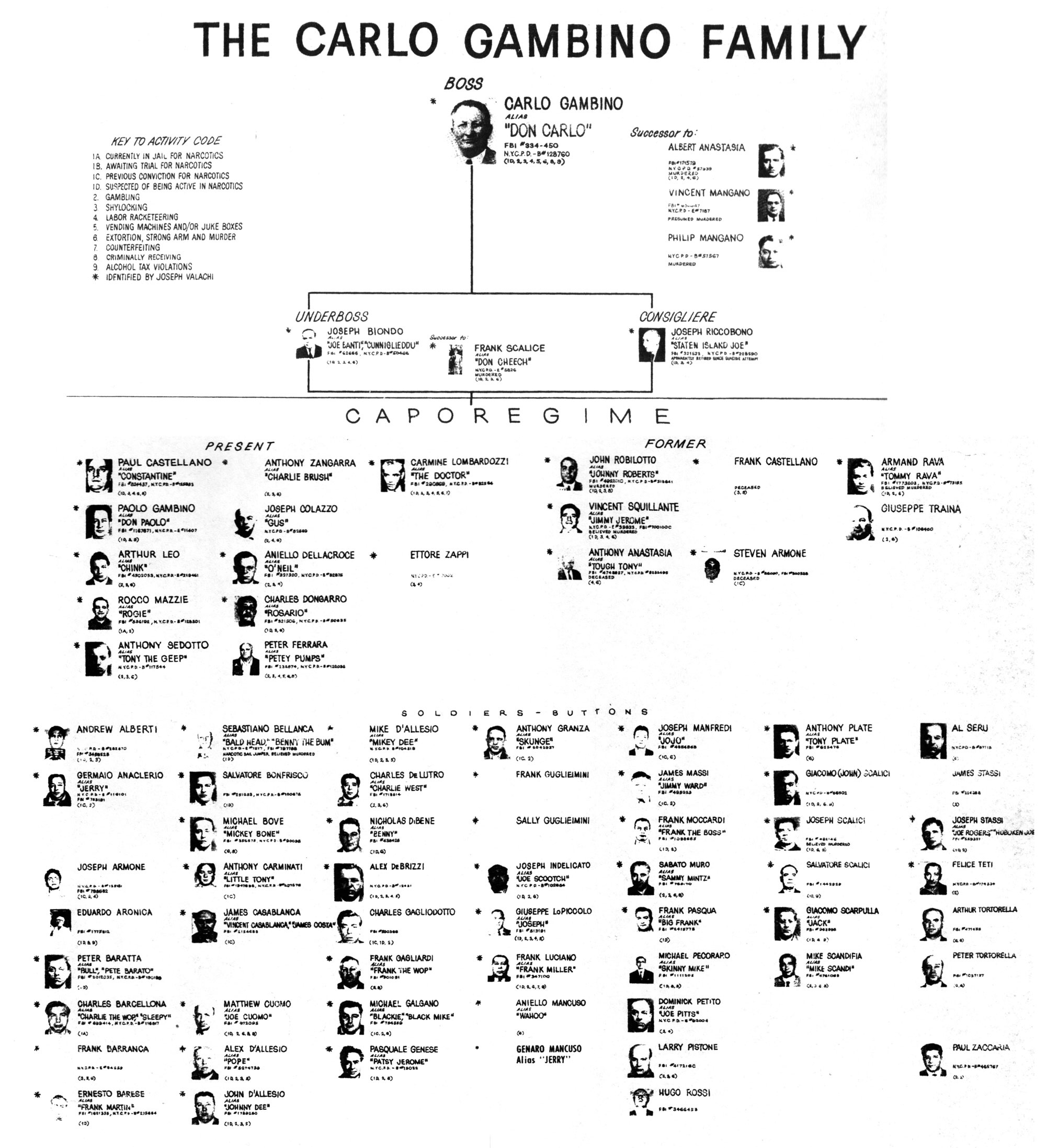
Hierarchical representation of the Gambino family under the era of Carlo Gambino

With Anastasia's death, Carlo Gambino became boss of what was now called the Gambino crime family. Joseph Biondo was appointed underboss; he was, by 1965, replaced by Aniello Dellacroce.

Gambino and Luciano then allegedly provided a part of the $100,000 paid to a Puerto Rican drug dealer to falsely implicate Genovese in a drug deal. In April 1959, Genovese was sentenced to 15 years in federal prison, where he died in 1969.

Gambino quickly built the family into the most powerful crime family in the United States. He was helped by Meyer Lansky's offshore gaming houses in Cuba and the Bahamas, a lucrative business for the Cosa Nostra.

==== Control of other crime families ====
In 1964, Joseph "Joe Bananas" Bonanno, the head of the Bonanno crime family, and Joseph Magliocco, the new boss of the Profaci crime family, conspired to kill Gambino and his allies on the Commission. However, the man entrusted with the job, Joseph Colombo, instead revealed the plot to Gambino. The Commission, led by Gambino, forced Magliocco to resign and hand over his family to Colombo, while Bonanno fled New York. Gambino then became the most powerful leader of the "Five Families".

In 1971, Gambino allegedly used his power to orchestrate the shooting of Colombo. Gambino and his allies were unhappy about Colombo's high public profile. Jerome Johnson shot Colombo on June 28, 1971 at the second "Italian-American Unity Day" rally; Johnson was then shot and killed on the spot by Colombo's bodyguards. Johnson was tentatively linked to the Gambino family, but no one else was charged in the shooting. Colombo survived the shooting, but remained paralyzed until his death in 1978.

Gambino's influence also stretched into behind-the-scenes control of the Lucchese crime family, led by Carmine "Mr. Gribbs" Tramunti.

In 1972, Gambino allegedly picked Frank "Funzi" Tieri to be front boss of the Genovese crime family. Gambino had allegedly ordered the murder of Tieri's predecessor Thomas Eboli after Eboli failed to repay a $3 million loan to Gambino. Others believe that Eboli was killed by his own crime family for his erratic ways.

Under Gambino, the family gained particularly strong influence in the construction industry. It acquired behind-the-scenes control of Teamsters Local 282, which controlled access to most building materials in the New York City area and could literally bring most construction jobs in New York City to a halt.

On October 15, 1976, Carlo Gambino died at home of natural causes. Against expectations, he had appointed Castellano to succeed him over his underboss Dellacroce. Gambino appeared to believe that his crime family would benefit from Castellano's focus on white collar businesses. Dellacroce, at the time, was imprisoned for tax evasion and was unable to contest Castellano's succession.

Castellano's succession was confirmed at a meeting on November 24, with Dellacroce present. Castellano arranged for Dellacroce to remain as underboss while directly running traditional Cosa Nostra activities such as extortion, robbery, and loansharking. While Dellacroce accepted Castellano's succession, the deal effectively split the Gambino family into two rival factions.

=== Castellano regime ===
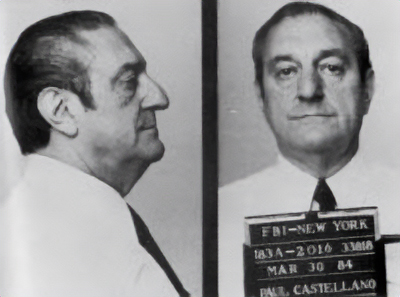
Paul Castellano

When Castellano became boss, he negotiated a division of responsibilities between himself and Dellacroce. Castellano took control of the so-called "white collar crimes" that included stock embezzlement and other big money rackets. Dellacroce retained control of the traditional Cosa Nostra activities. To maintain control over the Dellacroce faction, Castellano relied on the crew run by Anthony "Nino" Gaggi and Roy DeMeo. The DeMeo crew allegedly committed between 74 and 200 murders during the late 1970s and early 1980s.

As Castellano became more powerful in the Gambino family, he started to make large amounts of money from construction concrete. Castellano's son Philip was the president of Scara-Mix Concrete Corporation, which exercised a near monopoly on Staten Island on construction concrete. Castellano also handled the Gambino interests in the "Concrete Club", a club of contractors selected by The Commission to handle contracts between $2 million and $15 million. In return, the contractors gave a two percent kickback of the contract value to The Commission. Castellano also supervised Gambino control of Teamsters Union Local Chapter 282, which provided workers to pour concrete at all major building projects in New York and Long Island.

==== Gambino family case ====
In response to the rise of the Gambino family, federal prosecutors targeted the family leadership. On March 31, 1984 a federal grand jury indicted Castellano and 20 other Gambino members and associates with charges of drug trafficking, murder, theft, and prostitution. The following year, he received a second indictment for his role in the Mafia's Commission. Facing life imprisonment for either case, Castellano arranged for Gotti to serve as an acting boss alongside Thomas Bilotti, Castellano's favorite capo, and Thomas Gambino in his absence.

==== Conflict with Gotti ====
Castellano's most vocal critic was John Gotti, a Queens-based capo and Dellacroce's protégé. Gotti was ambitious and wanted to be boss himself. Gotti rapidly became dissatisfied with Castellano's leadership, regarding the new boss as being too isolated and greedy. Like other members of the family, Gotti also personally disliked Castellano. The boss lacked street credibility, and those who had paid their dues running street level jobs did not respect him. Gotti also had an economic interest: he had a running dispute with Castellano on the split Gotti took from hijackings at Kennedy Airport. Gotti was also rumored to be expanding into drug dealing, a lucrative trade Castellano had banned.

In August 1983, Ruggiero and Gene Gotti were arrested for dealing heroin, based primarily on recordings from a bug in Ruggiero's house. Castellano, who had banned made men from his family from dealing drugs under threat of death, demanded transcripts of the tapes, and, when Ruggiero refused, threatened to demote Gotti.

Gotti began conspiring with fellow disgruntled capos Frank DeCicco and Joseph "Joe Piney" Armone and soldiers Sammy Gravano and Robert "DiB" DiBernardo (collectively dubbed "the Fist" by themselves) to overthrow Castellano, insisting, despite the boss' inaction, that Castellano would eventually try to kill him. Armone's support was critical; as a respected old-timer who dated back to the family's founder, Vincent Mangano, he would lend needed credibility to the conspirators' cause.

It has long been a rule in the Mafia that killing a boss is forbidden without the support of a majority of the Commission. Indeed, Gotti's planned hit would have been the first attack on a boss since Albert Anastasia was killed in 1957. Gotti knew that it would be too risky to solicit support from the other four bosses, since they had longstanding ties to Castellano. To get around this, he got the support of several important figures of his generation in the Lucchese, Colombo and Bonanno families. He did not consider approaching the Genovese family, as Castellano had close ties with Genovese boss Vincent "Chin" Gigante. However, Gotti could also count on the complicity of Gambino consigliere Joseph N. Gallo.

After Dellacroce died of cancer on December 2, 1985, Castellano revised his succession plan: appointing Bilotti as underboss to Thomas Gambino as the sole acting boss, while making plans to break up Gotti's crew. Infuriated by this, and Castellano's refusal to attend Dellacroce's wake, Gotti resolved to kill his boss.

On December 16, 1985, Bilotti and Castellano arrived at Sparks Steak House in Manhattan for a dinner meeting with capo Frank DeCicco. DeCicco had tipped off Gotti that he would be meeting with Castellano and several other Gambino mobsters at Sparks that evening. As Bilotti and Castellano were exiting their car, four unidentified men under Gotti's command shot them to death. Gotti watched the hit from his car with Gravano.

=== John Gotti ===
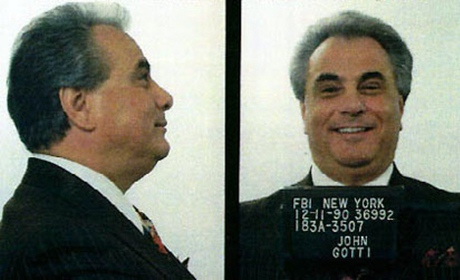
John Gotti after his arrest in 1990

Several days after the Castellano murder, Gotti was named to a three-man committee, along with Gallo and DeCicco, to temporarily run the family pending the election of a new boss. It was also announced that an internal investigation into Castellano's murder was underway. However, it was an open secret that Gotti was acting boss in all but name, and nearly all of the family's capos knew he had been the one behind the hit. He was formally acclaimed as the new boss of the Gambino family at a meeting of 20 capos held on January 15, 1986.

Gotti appointed Frank DeCicco as underboss and promoted Angelo Ruggiero and Sammy Gravano to capo. At the time of his takeover, the Gambino family was regarded as the most powerful American mafia family, with an annual income of $500 million.

Gotti was known as "The Dapper Don", renowned for his hand-tailored suits and silk ties. Unlike his colleagues, Gotti made little effort to hide his mob connections and was very willing to provide interesting sound bites to the media. His home in Howard Beach, Queens was frequently seen on television. He liked to hold meetings with family members while walking in public places so that law enforcement agents could not record the conversations. One of Gotti's neighbors in Howard Beach was Joseph Massino, underboss of the Bonanno crime family. Gotti and Massino had a longstanding friendship dating back to the 1970s when they were known as two of the most proficient truck hijackers in New York.

Mob leaders from the other families were enraged at the Castellano murder and disapproved of Gotti's high-profile style. Gotti's strongest enemy was Genovese crime family boss Vincent "Chin" Gigante, a former Castellano ally. Gigante conspired with Lucchese boss Anthony "Tony Ducks" Corallo to have Gotti killed. Corallo gave the contract to two top members of his family, Vittorio "Vic" Amuso and Anthony "Gaspipe" Casso.

Gotti's newfound fame had at least one positive effect for Gotti; upon the revelation of his attacker's occupation, and amid reports of intimidation by the Gambinos, Romual Piecyk decided not to testify against Gotti thanks to Boško "The Yugo" Radonjić, the head of the Westies in Hell's Kitchen, Manhattan. When the trial began in March 1986, Piecyk testified he was unable to remember who attacked him. The case was promptly dismissed, with the New York Post summarizing the proceedings with the headline "I Forgotti!" It was later revealed that Gambino thugs had severed Piecyk's brake lines, made threatening phone calls, and stalked him before the trial.

On April 13, 1986, DeCicco was killed when his car was bombed following a visit to Castellano loyalist James Failla. The bombing was carried out by Victor Amuso and Anthony Casso of the Lucchese family, under orders of Gigante and Lucchese boss Anthony Corallo, to avenge Castellano and Bilotti by killing their successors; Gotti also planned to visit Failla that day, but canceled, and the bomb was detonated after a soldier who rode with DeCicco was mistaken for the boss. Bombs had long been banned by the Mafia out of concern that it would put innocent people in harm's way, leading the Gambinos to initially suspect that "zips"—Sicilian mafiosi working in the U.S.—were behind it; zips were well known for using bombs.

Following the bombing, Judge Eugene Nickerson, presiding over Gotti's racketeering trial, rescheduled the trial to avoid a jury tainted by the resulting publicity, while prosecutor Diane Giacalone had Gotti's bail revoked due to evidence of witness intimidation in the Piecyk case. From jail, Gotti ordered the murder of Robert DiBernardo by Gravano; both DiBernardo and Ruggiero had been vying to succeed DeCicco until Ruggiero accused DiBernardo of challenging Gotti's leadership. When Ruggiero, also under indictment, had his bail revoked for his abrasive behavior in preliminary hearings, a frustrated Gotti instead promoted Armone to underboss.

Jury selection for the racketeering case began again in August 1986, with Gotti standing trial alongside Willie Boy Johnson (who, despite being exposed as an informant, refused to turn state's evidence), Leonard DiMaria, Tony Rampino, Nicholas Corozzo and John Carneglia. At this point, the Gambinos were able to compromise the case when George Pape hid his friendship with Radonjić and was empaneled as juror No. 11. Through Radonjić, Pape contacted Gravano and agreed to sell his vote on the jury for $60,000.

In the trial's opening statements on September 25, Gotti's defense attorney Bruce Cutler denied the existence of the Gambino family and framed the government's entire effort as a personal vendetta. His main defense strategy during the prosecution was to attack the credibility of Giacalone's witnesses by discussing their crimes committed before their turning state's evidence. During Gotti's defense, Cutler called bank robber Matthew Traynor, a would-be prosecution witness dropped for unreliability, who testified that Giacalone offered him drugs and her panties as a masturbation aid in exchange for his testimony; Traynor's allegations would be dismissed by Judge Nickerson as "wholly unbelievable" after the trial, and he was subsequently convicted of perjury.

Despite Cutler's defense and critiques about the prosecution's performance, according to mob writers Jerry Capeci and Gene Mustain, when the jury's deliberations began, a majority were in favor of convicting Gotti. However, due to Pape's misconduct, Gotti knew from the beginning of the trial that he could do no worse than a hung jury. During deliberations, Pape held out for acquittal until the rest of the jury began to fear their own safety would be compromised. On March 13, 1987, they acquitted Gotti and his codefendants of all charges. Five years later, Pape was convicted of obstruction of justice for his part in the fix and sentenced to three years in prison.

In the face of previous Mafia convictions, particularly the success of the Mafia Commission Trial, Gotti's acquittal was a major upset that further added to his reputation. The American media dubbed Gotti "The Teflon Don" in reference to the failure of any charges to "stick".

==== 1992 conviction ====
On December 11, 1990, FBI agents and NYPD detectives raided the Ravenite Social Club, arresting Gravano, Gotti and LoCascio. Gravano pleaded guilty to a superseding racketeering charge, and Gotti charged with five murders (Castellano, Bilotti, DiBernardo, Liborio Milito and Louis Dibono), conspiracy to murder Gaetano Vastola, loansharking, illegal gambling, obstruction of justice, bribery and tax evasion. Based on tapes from FBI bugs played at pretrial hearings, the Gambino administration was denied bail. At the same time, attorneys Bruce Cutler and Gerald Shargel were disqualified from defending Gotti and Gravano after prosecutors successfully contended they were "part of the evidence" and thus liable to be called as witnesses. Prosecutors argued that Cutler and Shargel not only knew about potential criminal activity, but had worked as "in-house counsel" for the Gambino family. Gotti subsequently hired Albert Krieger, a Miami attorney who had worked with Joseph Bonanno, to replace Cutler.

The tapes also created a rift between Gotti and Gravano, showing the Gambino boss describing his newly appointed underboss as too greedy and attempting to frame Gravano as the main force behind the murders of DiBernardo, Milito and Dibono. Gotti's attempt at reconciliation failed, leaving Gravano disillusioned with the mob and doubtful of his chances of winning his case without Shargel, his former attorney.

Gravano ultimately opted to turn state's evidence, formally agreeing to testify on November 13, 1991. At the time, he was the highest-ranking member of a New York crime family to turn informer.

Gotti and LoCascio were tried in the U.S. District Court for the Eastern District of New York before District Judge I. Leo Glasser. Jury selection began in January 1992 with an anonymous jury and, for the first time in a Brooklyn federal case, fully sequestered during the trial due to Gotti's reputation for jury tampering. The trial commenced with the prosecution's opening statements on February 12; prosecutors Andrew Maloney and John Gleeson began their case by playing tapes showing Gotti discussing Gambino family business, including murders he approved, and confirming the animosity between Gotti and Castellano to establish the former's motive to kill his boss. After calling an eyewitness of the Sparks hit who identified Carneglia as one of the men who shot Bilotti, they then called Gravano as a witness on March 2.

On the stand, Gravano confirmed Gotti's place in the structure of the Gambino family and described in detail the conspiracy to assassinate Castellano, giving a full description of the hit and its aftermath. Gravano confessed to 19 murders, implicating Gotti in four of them. Neither Krieger nor Anthony Cardinale, LoCascio's attorney, were able to shake Gravano during cross-examination. Among other outbursts, Gotti called Gravano a junkie while his attorneys sought to discuss his past steroid use. After presenting additional testimony and tapes, the government rested its case on March 24.

On June 23, 1992, Glasser sentenced Gotti and LoCascio to life imprisonment without the possibility of parole and a $250,000 fine. Gotti surrendered to federal authorities to serve his prison time on December 14, 1992. On September 26, 1994, a federal judge sentenced Gravano to five years in prison. However, since Gravano had already served four years, the sentence amounted to less than one year.

Gotti continued to rule the family from prison, while day-to-day operation of the family shifted to capos John "Jackie Nose" D'Amico and Nicholas "Little Nick" Corozzo. The latter was due to take over as acting boss but was himself sentenced to eight years in prison on racketeering charges. Gotti's son John "Junior" Gotti took over as head of the family, but he pled guilty to racketeering in 1999 and was sentenced to 77 months in jail.

=== Peter Gotti ===
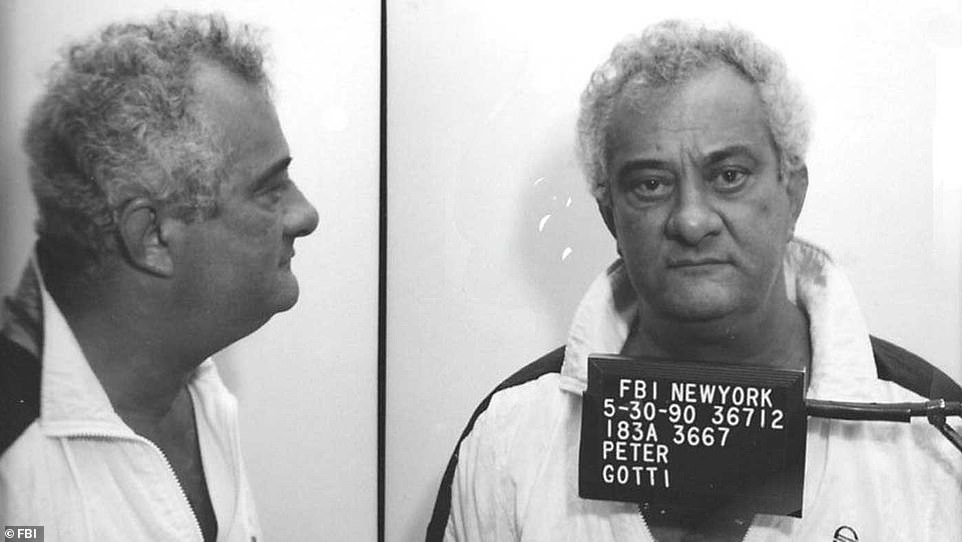
Peter Gotti

Peter Gotti took over control of the family some time likely in 2001 before his brother John Gotti died in prison on June 10, 2002. With Peter Gotti in charge the family's fortunes dwindled to a remarkable extent, given their power a few decades ago when they were considered the most powerful criminal organization in America. Peter Gotti was imprisoned in 2003, and the leadership allegedly went to administration members Nicholas Corozzo, Jackie D'Amico, and Joseph Corozzo. Peter Gotti remained the official boss while in prison.

Gotti's rivals regained control of the family, mostly because the rest of Gotti's loyalists were either jailed or under indictments. Michael "Mikey Scars" DiLeonardo, the former head of the family's white collar operations and one of the last Gotti supporters, turned state's evidence due to increased law enforcement pressure and credible evidence to be presented in his racketeering trial and due to the administration shelving him accusing him of stealing money from the family. He chose to testify against mobsters from all of the Five Families. DiLeonardo testified against Peter Gotti and Anthony "Sonny" Ciccone, among others, from 2003 to 2005, and then disappeared into the Witness Protection Program.

Operation Old Bridge broke up a growing alliance between the Gambinos and the Sicilian Mafia, which wanted to get further into the drug trade. One of those arrested in the raids in the US was Frank Cali, future boss of the Gambino family. He was allegedly the "ambassador" in the US for the Inzerillo crime family.

=== Domenico Cefalù and Frank Cali ===
When federal and New York State authorities rounded up the entire Gambino family hierarchy in early 2008, a three-man panel of street bosses Daniel "Danny" Marino, John Gambino and Bartolomeo Vernace took control of the Gambino family while the administration members were in prison. In July 2011, it was reported that Domenico Cefalù had been promoted to acting boss of the crime family, putting an end to the Gotti reign. Cefalù's reign saw the Sicilian faction, better known as "Zips", gain control of the Gambino crime family. It was reported by crime reporter Jerry Capeci that Cefalù stepped down in 2015 and his underboss, Frank Cali, took full control. However, a week later, Capeci issued a correction reporting that Cefalù remained the acting boss. The family was believed to have between 150 and 200 members as well as over 1100 associates.

The family continued to be active in a variety of criminal enterprises, including gambling, loansharking, extortion, labor racketeering, fraud, money laundering and narcotic trafficking. In 2012 the Gambino family still had some control on piers in Brooklyn and Staten Island through infiltrated labor unions. Indictments from 2008 to 2014 showed that the family was still very active in New York City.

On November 18, 2009, the NYPD arrested 22 members and associates of the Lucchese and Gambino crime families as part of "Operation Pure Luck". The raid was a result of cases involving loansharking and sports gambling on Staten Island. There were also charges of bribing New York City court officers and Sanitation Department officials.

In 2014, FBI and Italian police arrested 17 members and associates of the 'ndrangheta Mafia, in particular the Ursino clan, and 7 members and associates of the Gambino and Bonanno families. The arrested were accused by prosecutors and law enforcement officials of organizing a transatlantic drug ring with the aim of shipping 500 kg of pure cocaine from Guyana in South America to the port of Gioia Tauro in Calabria. US Attorney Loretta Lynch singled out Gambino family associate Franco Lupoi as the linchpin of the operation, accusing him of conspiring with his father-in-law, Nicola Antonio Simonetta, a member of the Ursino clan, to set up the network.

On December 12, 2017, five associates of the Gambino family, Thomas Anzaone, Alessandro "Sandro" Damelio, Joseph Durso, Anthony Rodolico, and Anthony Saladino, along with 74-year-old captain John "Johnny Boy" Ambrosio, were arrested and accused of operating an illegal racketeering enterprise from January 2014 to December 2017, involving racketeering, extortion, drug trafficking, loansharking and illegal gambling. Bonanno crime family soldier, Frank "Frankie Boy" Salerno, was also arrested and accused of conspiring with the Gambino crime family. Associates Anzaone, Damelio and Durso, together with Bonanno soldier Saladino, were alleged to have sold cocaine, marijuana and Xanax in large quantities. Prosecutors said Salerno and Saladino sourced the drugs in kilograms then sold it to the others to be distributed. An undercover agent alleged that he paid $1,250 for one ounce (28 g) of cocaine and also bought nearly a kilogram in 12 different sales between February and June in 2016.

Ambrosio was said to have been the head of a very profitable loansharking and illegal gambling operation, including unlicensed gambling parlors, electronic gaming machines and internet sports betting. Prosecutors said that he and Rodolico attempted to obstruct the federal grand jury proceeding into their criminal activities by intimidating a loan shark victim into lying to law enforcement.

Frank Cali was shot dead on March 13, 2019, outside his home on Staten Island by a lone gunman. Cali's murder was the first murder of a boss since the 1985 assassination of Paul Castellano. Three days later, 24-year-old Anthony Comello was arrested and charged with the murder. Comello pleaded not guilty after initially confessing his guilt to the police, and was found mentally unfit for trial in June 2020. According to court documents obtained by the Staten Island Advance in January 2025, Comello eventually pleaded guilty to manslaughter and had been sentenced to an undisclosed correctional facility, with the length of his sentence also remaining undisclosed due to ongoing concerns about his safety.

=== Current position and leadership ===
Following Cali's death, it was reported that Lorenzo Mannino had become the new Gambino leader.

On March 14, 2019, Gambino family associate Anthony Pandrella was indicted for the murder and robbery of 77-year-old loan shark Vincent Zito on October 26, 2018. According to court papers, Pandrella murdered Zito out of fear that he would kill him first over an unpaid $750,000 debt he owed him. The day he was supposed to pay the debt, Pandrella visited Zito at his home in Sheepshead Bay, Brooklyn and shot him at point-blank range in the back of the head, stealing Zito's loan business' assets and cleaning up any incriminating evidence at the scene before getting out of the house. Hours after murdering him, Pandrella came back to his house to tend to Zito's family and friends and question them about developments in the police homicide investigation. On June 14, 2022, Pandrella was found guilty of robbery, murder, and unlawful use of a firearm. He was sentenced to 40 years in prison on October 6, 2022.

In July 2019, Thomas Gambino, 47, (considered by the FBI to be a significant member of the Gambino family) was one of 15 suspected members of the Inzerillo crime family arrested in coordinated raids in Sicily and the United States. Italian police said Gambino was caught on video meeting with ranking members of the Inzerillo clan on a speedboat off the coast of Palermo a year earlier, allegedly discussing the sale of property formerly owned by Frank Cali. Rosario Gambino was also arrested.

On December 5, 2019, Gambino family capo Andrew Campos and nine other gangsters were arrested in a federal mob crackdown in the Bronx and Westchester County, on allegations of threats of violence to extort money. On December 6, John Simonlacaj, cousin of Mark "Chippy" Kocaj and a managing director of the HFZ Capital Group was arraigned in Brooklyn Federal Court on federal charges of wire fraud conspiracy and tax fraud. Prosecutors alleged that CWC Contracting, operated by Kocaj, Campos and Vincent Fiore, paid bribes to employees of numerous construction companies and real estate developers, including HFZ Capital.

On January 18, 2023, Gambino family capo Frank "Calypso" Camuso, soldier Louis Astuto and associate Robert "Rusty" Baselice were indicted along 20 other defendants including Genovese family soldier Christopher "Jerry" Chierchio, and 26 companies by the Manhattan District Attorney's Office for a kickback scheme operated by Baselice, the vice president of the Grimaldi Group, a firm which allegedly received $4.2 million from contractors. From April 2013 to July 2021, Baselice reportedly used his position to steal from his firm's developer clients by providing inside information about competitors' bids to subcontractors, among other offenses. According to the indictment, Astuto and family associate Paul Noto distributed a portion of the proceeds from the kickbacks to companies Camuso and his family owned.

On November 8, 2023, 16 Gambino family members and associates were indicted on charges of racketeering conspiracy, extortion, witness retaliation, and union corruption. Included in the indictment was Joseph Lanni, a Gambino captain, and soldiers Angelo "Fifi" Gradilone, James LaForte, and Diego "Danny" Tantillo. The arrests were a joint effort between American federal authorities and Italian authorities. The arrested mobsters were accused of using violent tactics to infiltrate garbage and carting companies to extort money and gain "no-show jobs". Soldier Diego Tantillo is also accused of embezzling funds from employee pension plans, and conspiring to rig bids for demolition contracts throughout New York City.

17 members and associates of the Gambino family were charged in an 84-count indictment on June 5, 2024 in relation to the operation of Staten Island-based illegal sports gambling operation, which handled more than $22.7 million in illegal bets, and a loansharking operation that generated approximately $500,000 per week from loan payments. Among those arrested were Gambino soldiers John J. LaForte, Anthony J. Cinque, Jr. and John Matera, Gambino associates Edward A. LaForte, Frederick P. Falcone, Sr., Giulio Pomponio and Daniel F. Bogan, and Colombo family associate Charles Fusco.

== Historical leadership ==
The Gambino crime family had a hierarchical structure similar to the other Italian-American mafias. Their commander in chief, the "boss" was the oversight for the entire group. The second in command, the "underboss", was usually a close relative or friend of the boss. They were expected to take over (in most cases) as the successor to the boss if he were to go to prison or die. The boss had a Consigliere who was the mentor to the boss, who assisted him on decision making. The Capos were in charge of the crews of soldiers, and were over a territory of New York City. They ensured the crews of lower-ranked members were following the rules from the Boss and moving forward with the organization's goals. The "soldiers" were doing most of the work for the crime family, and they would be sworn into the system and used as runners for the family. Within the soldiers, there were "earners" and "enforcers". The earners would push revenue and get the cash for the organization and the enforcers would utilize violent acts if necessary and if they were told to do so by the Boss. The soldiers were "made" men, which meant that they were protected from being killed unless the Boss approves of it. The lowest members from the organization were called "associates", who would commit criminal acts for the organization but were not "made". The benefit of being an associate would be the distance from the organization, including the oath that the associate wouldn't have to make for the mafia.

=== Boss (official and acting) ===
- c. 1900s–1910 – Ignazio "the Wolf" Lupo – imprisoned in 1910.
- 1910–1928 – Salvatore "Toto" D'Aquila – took over the Brooklyn Camorra in 1916 and merged with Al Mineo's gang forming the largest family in New York. He was killed on orders of Joe Masseria in 1928.
- 1928–1930 – Manfredi "Alfred" Mineo – killed in Castellammarese War in 1930.
- 1930–1931 – Frank Scalice – stepped down and became consigliere, after the murder of boss of all bosses Salvatore Maranzano.
- 1931–1951 – Vincent Mangano – disappeared in April 1951, allegedly killed on orders of underboss Albert Anastasia.
- 1951–1957 – Albert Anastasia – murdered in October 1957 on orders of underboss Carlo Gambino.
- 1957–1976 – Carlo Gambino – died of natural causes in 1976.
  - Acting 1960s–1976 – Paul Castellano – acting boss for Gambino, became official boss after his death.
- 1976–1985 – Paul Castellano – murdered in December 1985 on orders of capo John Gotti.
- 1986–2002 – John Gotti – imprisoned in 1990, died in 2002.
  - Acting 1992–1999 – John A. Gotti – imprisoned in 1999, later retired.
  - Acting 1999–2002 – Peter Gotti – promoted to official boss.
- 2002–2011 – Peter Gotti – imprisoned in 2002, deposed, later died in 2021.
  - Acting 2002–2005 – Arnold Squitieri
  - Acting 2005–2008 – John D'Amico
- 2011–present – Domenico "Italian Dom" Cefalù
  - Acting 2015–2019 – Frank Cali – murdered in March 2019.
  - Acting 2019–present – Lorenzo Mannino

=== Committees ===
From Gotti's imprisonment in 1990, several capo committees have periodically replaced the underboss and consigliere positions, allowing an imprisoned boss better control of the family.

- 1985–1986 – John Gotti (became boss), Frank DeCicco (became underboss), Joseph N. Gallo
- 1986 – Angelo Ruggiero (died 1989), Joseph Armone (died 1992), Salvatore Gravano (until 1987 when he became consigliere), Frank LoCascio (until 1990 when he became consigliere)
- 1990–1991 – John A. Gotti, James Failla, John D'Amico, Louis Vallario, Peter Gotti
- 1991–1993 – John A. Gotti, James Failla, John D'Amico, Joseph Arcuri, Peter Gotti
- 1993–1996 – John A. Gotti, Nicholas Corozzo, John D'Amico, Joseph Arcuri, Peter Gotti
- 1996–1999 – John A. Gotti, Stephen Grammauta, John D'Amico, Joseph Arcuri, Peter Gotti
- 2008–2010 – Daniel Marino (jailed), Bartolomeo Vernace (jailed), and John Gambino
- 2013–2016 – John Gambino (died 2016), Anthony Gurino, Joseph Juliano
- 2016–2019 – Anthony Gurino (died 2019), Joseph Juliano

=== Underboss (official and acting) ===
- 1928–1930 – Stefano Ferrigno – killed in 1930.
- 1930–1951 – Albert Anastasia – became official boss in 1951.
- 1951–1957 – Salvatore Chiri
- 1957 – Carlo Gambino – became boss.
- 1957–1965 – Joseph Biondo – demoted by Gambino in 1965.
- 1965–1985 – Aniello Dellacroce – died of natural causes in 1985.
  - Acting 1974–1976 – James Failla
- 1985 – Thomas Bilotti – murdered in 1985 on orders of capo John Gotti after 11 days.
- 1986 – Frank DeCicco – murdered in 1986 by Lucchese family hitmen.
- 1986–1990 – Joseph Armone – sentenced to 15 years in prison in 1987, became consigliere.
  - Acting 1988–1990 – Frank LoCascio – became acting consigliere.
- 1990–1991 – Salvatore Gravano – turned government witness in 1991.
- 1999–2005 – Arnold Squitieri – arrested in 2005, released in 2012.
  - Acting 1999–2002 – Stephen Grammauta – retired.
  - Acting 2002–2005 – Anthony Megale – arrested in 2005.
  - Acting 2005 – Domenico Cefalù – became underboss.
- 2005–2011 – Domenico Cefalù – became boss
- 2012–2015 – Frank Cali – became acting boss.
- 2015–2017 – Giovanni "John" Gambino – died of natural causes, on November 16, 2017.
- 2018–2019 – Lorenzo Mannino – became acting boss.
- 2019–202? – Unknown
- 202?–present – Leonard "Lenny" DiMaria

=== Consigliere (official and acting) ===
- 1931–1957 – Frank Scalice – murdered in 1957.
- 1957 – Joseph Biondo – became underboss.
- 1957–1967 – Joseph Riccobono – retired in 1967, deceased in 1975.
- 1967–1987 – Joseph N. Gallo – demoted
  - Acting 1987 – Salvatore Gravano – became official consigliere
- 1987–1990 – Salvatore Gravano – became underboss.
- 1990–1992 – Joseph Armone – former underboss, died in prison 1992.
  - Acting 1990–1992 – Frank LoCascio – convicted 1992.
- 1992–2011 – Joseph Corozzo – imprisoned in 2008, released January 5, 2016.
- 2011–2017 – Bartolomeo "Bobby Glasses" Vernace – arrested 2011, convicted 2014, died in prison 2017.
  - Acting 2014–2018 – Lorenzo Mannino – became underboss
  - Acting 2018–2019 – Michael "Mickey Boy" Paradiso – became official consigliere
- 2019–202? – Michael "Mickey Boy" Paradiso
- 202?–present – Lorenzo Mannino – also serves as acting boss
  - Acting 2024–present – Louis "Big Lou" Vallario

== Current members ==
=== Administration ===
- Boss — Domenico "Italian Dom" Cefalù (born January 10, 1947) — current boss of the family. Cefalù became involved through the drug trade. Not much is known about Cefalù due to his deliberate "low-key" presence other than his 1982 heroin trafficking sentence; he served six years. He was inducted into the Gambino family in 1991. In 1992 and 1993, Cefalù refused to testify against Pasquale Conte and was sentenced to an 18-month imprisonment; he was released in February 1994. Around 1995 or 1996, he was sentenced to 33 months for criminal contempt. In the mid-2000s, Jackie D'Amico promoted Cefalù to acting underboss, until his succession to boss in 2011. Despite rumours and speculation over the years, Cefalù has continued his reign as official boss since 2011.
- Street boss/consigliere — Lorenzo "Lore" Mannino (born July 27, 1959) — current street boss and consigliere of the family. Mannino was formerly part of the "Sicilian faction" and an associate of John Gambino before becoming a powerful capo in Brooklyn. He was implicated by Sammy Gravano in the 1988 killing of Francesco Oliveri. In 1994, he was sentenced to 15 years and fined $25,000 for drug trafficking and racketeering.
- Underboss — Leonard "Lenny" DiMaria (born October 10, 1941) — current underboss of the family. DiMaria became a capo in the 1980s and served as a top associate of John Gotti during his reign. During the 1990s, he oversaw the family's operations in South Florida along with Nicholas Corozzo. In 1998, DiMaria was sentenced to five years in federal prison for racketeering, loansharking and dealing in stolen property. He was later instrumental in transitioning the family from the control of the Gotti regime to the Sicilian faction. DiMaria was promoted to underboss during the reign of acting boss Lorenzo Mannino.
- Acting consigliere — Louis "Big Louie" Vallario (born June 16, 1942) — current acting consigliere of the family. Vallario was an influential Gambino member during the 1980s and a close and trusted friend of John Gotti. Due to Gotti's incarceration, Vallario led the family as a member of the "Ruling Panel" along with other Gambino family members, until 2002. Vallario was most recently released from prison in 2013. In January 2025, Vallario was identified as acting consigliere for the Gambino family.

=== Caporegimes ===
During the John Gotti era of the 1980s and '90s, the Gambino family had 23 active crews operating in New York City, New Jersey, Long Island, South Florida, and Connecticut. However, according to a 2004 report by the New Jersey State Commission of Investigation, the number of Gambino family crews had been reduced to around ten.

Brooklyn faction

- Dominick "Big D" Cefalù — capo of a Brooklyn crew, and first cousin to boss Domenico Cefalù. Cefalù was indicted in 2011 on extortion and illegal gambling counts for threatening and shaking down a man over a $500,000 debt.
- Nicholas "Little Nick" Corozzo — capo operating from Brooklyn and Queens. Corozzo has an extensive history in the family that dates back to the reign of John Gotti. A stellar earner for the family, Corozzo became a captain in the family following Gotti's imprisonment in 1992. In 1996, he was indicted in Miami and struck with racketeering charges including loansharking, attempted murder, and arson. He was convicted and released in 2004, however was indicted once again in 2008. Charged with racketeering and enterprise corruption, as well as the murder of Robert Arena and Thomas Matranga, Corozzo fled New York but surrendered to authorities months later. He pleaded guilty and was sentenced to 13 years in prison. He was released from prison in 2019. He is the brother of fellow Gambino members Blaise Corozzo and Joseph Corozzo, the family's former consigliere.
- Ernest "Ernie" Grillo — capo with operations in Brooklyn, Grillo has had a criminal record that dates back to the 1980s. In 1988, Grillo was one of several Gambino members and associates that was indicted and charged with numerous charges, including racketeering, extortion, loansharking, enterprise corruption, and murder. Grillo, then 32 years old and identified as a soldier, was identified as the leader of the crew, whose criminal ventures included extorting a building landlord of $50,000 due to his refusal of lending the building out to a mob-operated casino, and forcing a gas station owner to give up his office to the crew for meeting purposes. He was later sentenced to serve 11 years in prison. In February 2008, Grillo was one of many organized crime figures from several NY LCN families indicted. He was accused of extorting cement profits at the construction site of a New Jersey NASCAR track.
- Joseph "Sonny" Juliano — capo of a Brooklyn crew that operates illegal gambling, loansharking, fraud and wire fraud activities. In 2003, Juliano was indicted for his role in managing a multimillion-dollar illegal gambling ring in 30 New York City locations. He pleaded guilty and was sentenced to two to four years in prison, as well as being fined $550,000 in gambling proceeds to the state and $37,000 in back taxes.
- Joseph "Joe Brooklyn" Lanni — also known as "Mommino", Lanni is a capo of a Brooklyn crew with further operations in Staten Island, also involved in the family's Sicilian crew. Lanni reportedly is the successor to Frank Cali, and took control of Cali's rackets following his 2019 death. In October 2023, Lanni was arrested and charged with assaulting the male and female owners of a New Jersey restaurant. While under arrest for this assault, Lanni was indicted on November 8, 2023 along with 15 other members and associates of the family, including soldiers Angelo Gradilone, James LaForte, and Diego Tantillo. Charges included racketeering conspiracy, extortion, and union-related corruption. On October 17, 2025, he and six others pled guilty for using various criminal means to take control of New York City's demolition and trash businesses. Less than a week later, he was arrested for getting money from two crooked poker games regularly held in New York City that were controlled by Gambino, Genovese and Bonanno members.
- John Rizzo — capo with operations in Brooklyn, Staten Island and Manhattan. Rizzo was invited to the wedding of Gambino mobster Joseph Virzi in 2012, but had to be removed at the pressure of authorities since he is a known felon.

Staten Island faction

- Frank "Calypso" Camuso — capo of a Staten Island crew. on January 18, 2023, Camuso was indicted along with soldier Louis Astuto, associate Robert "Rusty" Baselice and 20 other defendants and 26 companies by the Manhattan District Attorney's Office for a kickback scheme operated by Baselice, the vice president of the Grimaldi Group, a firm which allegedly received $4.2 million from contractors. According to the indictment, Astuto and family associate Paul Noto distributed a portion of the proceeds from the kickbacks to companies Camuso and his family owned.
- Carmine Sciandra — capo of a crew in Staten Island who also co-owns three "Top Tomato" vegetable and fruit markets. In December 2005, Sciandra was shot and wounded by a retired policeman while working at his Staten Island market. On March 25, 2010, Sciandra pled guilty to state charges of enterprise corruption and grand larceny for running a massive sports betting and loan shark operation and was sentenced to serve between 1½ and 4½ years in prison. He was released on January 5, 2012.

Queens faction

- Thomas "Tommy Sneakers" Cacciopoli — capo of a crew in Queens, New Jersey, and Westchester. A top lieutenant of John A. Gotti during his time as Acting Boss, Cacciopoli was indicted on March 9, 2005 on charges of extortion, and was again indicted on February 8, 2008 for his part in the extortion of trucking companies at the NASCAR track site in Staten Island.
- Thomas "Monk" Sassano — capo of the Queens crew formerly headed by Alphonse Trucchio before his 2011 imprisonment, Sassano was involved with an extortion scheme in the 2000s along with captain Salvatore Scala. The two extorted the owner of a Manhattan strip club and used it as a training ground for family associates.

Manhattan faction

- Salvatore "Mr. Sal" Franco — capo of a Manhattan crew, Franco is the nephew of former family captain Joe Arcuri. Franco is a former union president and is the brother of Joseph Franco, who runs a restaurant located in the former Queens home of actor Rudolph Valentino.
- Louis Mastrangelo — capo with operations in Manhattan. Mastrangelo, along with former captain Alphonse Trucchio and other family members, were sentenced in 2012 for various crimes, including conspiracy, loansharking, and illegal gambling.

Bronx faction

- Andrew "Andy Campo" Campos — capo operating in the Bronx and Westchester. In December 2019, Campos was indicted along with Richard Martino, Vincent Fiore and others on charges of racketeering conspiracy, bribery, fraud and obstruction of justice. In the 2019 indictment authorities revealed that Campos made numerous visits to imprisoned Frank LoCascio. In January 2021, he pleaded guilty and was sentenced to 37 months in prison and was given a $15,000 fine.

New Jersey faction

- Louis "Bo" Filippelli — New Jersey mobster who took over Alphonse Sisca's crew due to Sisca's growing age. Filippelli was a top confidant of former underboss and acting boss Arnold Squitieri, serving as "street boss" of the family's New Jersey operations. He was convicted and sent to prison in 2006, along with Sisca.
- Nicholas "Nicky Mita" Mitarotonda — capo of a crew in Elizabeth, New Jersey. In August 1996, he was sentenced to almost seven years in prison for running a loan sharking operation and fined $40,000. Mitarotonda was also convicted of running an illegal gambling business worth $5 million however the charges were dropped as he agreed to a plea agreement. He was released in 2002. He was released from federal prison on March 1, 2011.

=== Soldiers ===
- Vincent Gotti (born on March 20, 1952) — current soldier. Gotti was born in Brooklyn and is the younger brother of Peter and John Gotti. In 1969, Gotti was dismissed for sexual assault. During the 1970s, Gotti worked within the construction industry and had several arrests at the time for theft. In 1974, he had pled guilty to robbery after he had committed felony theft at a gas station with a fake handgun. By 1980, Gotti was an associate of the Gambino family. In 1980, Gotti had sold cocaine to Dominick Polifrone, an NYPD undercover, and had discussed Gotti's contacts for firearms and narcotics which forced Gotti to go into hiding for several years. In the mid-1980s, along with Joseph Corozzo, Gotti was involved in a cocaine trafficking ring which was financed by Corozzo, Gotti had enlisted and involved Ronald Trucchio, John Alite and John A. Gotti, Trucchio overseed the operation and operated out of the PM Pub in Ozone Park, and the drug sales were conducted inside of bars in the Southwest of Ozone Park. In 1985, Gotti married Carmela J. Randazzo at a ceremony in Queens. According to prosecution witnesses, John Alite and Michael DiLeonardo, Gotti was barred from entry into the Ravenite social club and the Bergin Hunt and Fish Club due to substance abuse. In August 1985, waitress Robin Lynn Vitulli was strangled to death after an altercation with either Peter or Vincent Gotti. According to witness, John Alite, Vitulli was intoxicated on cocaine and became hostile towards Vincent Gotti, he had then strangled Vitulli and disposed of her body. In January 1986, he was arrested as he driving license was determined to be fraudulent. In the later part of January in 1986, he was sentenced to 6 years in prison after he pled guilty to narcotics charges, he was released in December 1991. By the early 1990s, Gotti served as a shop steward with the Mason Tenders Union Local 23, and was also employed by Turner Construction. By January 1993, Gotti and Vincent "Vinny Hot" DeCongilio were partnered in an loansharking operation, and was also involved in a marijuana trafficking ring with DeCongilio and Richard G. Gotti by January 1997. It is believed was formally inducted into the Gambino family in around November 2002 by Peter Gotti. In 2003, Gotti allegedly enlisted Richard G. Gotti, Angelo Ruggiero Jr. and Robert Mormando in a murder contract targeting Angelo Mugnolo, and in May 2003, Mugnolo was shot several times, prosecution witness, Peter "Bud" Zuccaro told on about the murder and admitted in his role as being the getaway driver. In February 2008, he was indicted as part of Operation Old Bridge for the Mugnolo murder, and in December 2008, he was sentenced to 8 years in prison, Gotti was released in February 2015.
- John Ambrosio (born 1943) — soldier. In December 2017, Ambrosio was indicted for loansharking and illegal gambling, over $66,000 was also seized at his home in Huntington, New York, and he was sentenced to over 4 years in prison with $100,000 in forfeiture. According to law enforcement, Ambrosio was associated with Bonanno family boss, Michael "The Nose" Mancuso, and formerly with the previous Gambino family boss, John Gotti.
- Louis Astuto — soldier operating from Staten Island and Manhattan. The son of acting capo Louis "Louie Fats" Astuto, he followed his father into the Gambino family and currently owns three companies in Staten Island. On January 18, 2023, Astuto was indicted by the Manhattan District Attorney's Office along with capo Frank "Calypso" Camuso and 21 other defendants, as well as 26 companies for a kickback scheme that stole approximately $4.2 million from Manhattan contractors. According to the indictment, Astuto and family associate Paul Noto distributed a portion of the proceeds from the kickbacks to companies Camuso and his family owned.
- Anthony "Sonny" Ciccone — soldier of the Gambino crew on the Brooklyn waterfront. Ciccone was convicted on extortion charges in 2003.
- Blaise Corozzo — soldier and another of the Corozzo brothers. He is serving a one to three-year sentence in state prison for a 2008 illegal gambling operation. His son Nicholas Corozzo, also involved with the Gambino family, was arrested in 2004. In 2009, Blaise Corozzo was released from prison.
- Vincent "Vinny Butch" Corrao — former capo of a Manhattan crew. Vincent's grandfather, "Vinny the Shrimp", operated the same crew and passed it to his son Joseph Corrao. Joseph later passed the crew to his son Vincent.
- Vincent DiModica (born 1931) — soldier. It is believed DiModica was first arrested in 1944. In October 1970, DiModica was arrested for possession of 2 pounds of heroin reputedly worth $140,000. In April 1997, DiModica was indicted for extortion, racketeering and operating an illegal gambling operation, and in late 1998, he was sentenced to 17 years in prison, after he was found guilty of extorting $200,000 from a contractor, and he was released in 2012.
- Vincent "Vinny Marbles" Dragonetti — is a soldier and son in law of notorious Gambino capo and former acting boss Nicholas Corozzo. On November 3, 1997, he pleaded guilty to loan sharking, conducting an illegal gambling business and tax evasion, and was sentenced to 3 years imprisonment and a $60,000 fine.
- Gene Gotti — soldier in the Gambino family. He is a brother of John, Peter, Richard, and Vincent Gotti.
- Richard G. Gotti — soldier in the Gambino family and served as a member of his father Richard V. Gotti's crew. He is a nephew of John, Peter, Gene, and Vincent Gotti and cousin of former acting boss John A. Gotti.
- Vincent Gotti — soldier in the Gambino family. Vincent is the youngest of the Gotti brothers and was inducted as a made man in 2002, the year his brother John died. In 2008, Vincent pled guilty to 8 years in prison for attempted murder and was released on February 22, 2015.
- Angelo Gradilone (born August 1966) — soldier. In November 2023, Gradilone was indicted for racketeering conspiracy and theft.
- Francesco Paul Graziano (born 1938) — soldier. In May 1993, Graziano was indicted for the October 1990 murder of Louis DiBono, and in September 1994, Graziano was sentenced to 10 years in prison with a $250,000 fine.
- Caesar Gurino — younger brother of former Gambino capo Anthony Gurino. In 1990, both Anthony and Caesar Gurino were convicted of obstruction of justice in a drug trial involving Gene Gotti.
- Joseph "Joe" Isgro (born 1948) — soldier. Isgro is known as a successful music promoter earning approximately $10 million per year during the 1980s, and at one point in 1976 he had joined Motown Records, interacting with such acts as Diana Ross, Marvin Gaye and Stevie Wonder. According to prosecutors in May 2000 after his arrest by the FBI and the Beverly Hills Police Department, Isgro had operated an extortion and loansharking operation since at least 1994, and in September 2000, Isgro was sentenced to over 4 years in prison. In July 2014, Isgro was indicted for conspiracy, money laundering and illegal gambling, and pleaded not guilty.
- Salvatore "Tore" LoCascio — former capo of a Bronx crew and son of Frank LoCascio. Along with Richard Martino, Salvatore introduced the Gambinos to online pornography operations that earned the family up to $350 million per year. In 2003, Salvatore was convicted and sent to prison. He was released from prison on August 1, 2008.
- Richard Martino (born April 1959) — soldier. In February 2005, Martino pleaded guilty to participating in a fraud scheme worth $650 million, and he was sentenced to 9 years in prison with over $9 million forfeiture, he was released in July 2014.
- Michael Matterazzo — soldier. Matterazzo is allegedly a member of the old Anthony Gurino crew.
- Michael Murdocco — soldier in Carmine Sciandra's crew. Murdocco and his son-in-law Sanitation Deputy Chief Frederick Grimaldi, rigged bids to help a New Jersey firm win a sanitation contract. In exchange for kickbacks, Grimaldi allegedly leaked bid information to Murdocco in May 2009. Currently serving two to six years in state prison after pleading guilty in March 2010 to enterprise corruption, grand larceny and receiving bribes. Murdocco was paroled on July 7, 2012.
- Michael Roccaforte — a reputed rising star in the Gambino family. He was reported to be the only member from the Gambino family under the rank of capo to attend the 2010 conference consisting of members from the New York crime families and the Philadelphia crime family. He served under capo Alphonse Trucchio, son of Ronnie Trucchio. Roccaforte was sentenced alongside Anthony Moscatiello for racketeering, selling narcotics, gambling, loansharking and numerous other offenses. He was released on December 14, 2018.
- Angelo Ruggiero Jr. (born March 1972) — In 2012, Ruggiero Jr. was indicted for witness tampering and money laundering, being accused of participating in a money laundering scheme from January 2001 and January 2010. In October 2025, Ruggiero was indicted for rigging high-stakes poker games in Manhattan and Las Vegas, such stars from the NBA involved were Chauncey Billups and Damon Jones, according to prosecutors, Ruggiero and his affiliates netted around $7 million. Ruggiero's defence team attempted to invoke bail of $5 million, however U.S. District Judge Joseph Marutollo declined the notion, citing concern for witness tampering.
- Joseph Sclafani — soldier who used to operate in Staten Island. Joseph Sclafani is the son of deceased Gambino capo Augustus Sclafani. He was a friend and drug partner of Bonanno family associate Costabile Farace and was seriously wounded in the shooting that killed Farace in 1989. Before his 2013 sentence of cocaine and marijuana trafficking, Sclafani was planning on marrying Ramona Rizzo, a star on Mob Wives. Rizzo is also the granddaughter of deceased Bonanno family soldier Benjamin Ruggiero. He was released on August 4, 2019.
- Paul Semplice — soldier. In March 2019, Semplice was sentenced by U.S. District Judge Pamela K. Chen to over two years in prison for loansharking and extortion.
- Ronald "Ronnie One Arm" Trucchio — soldier and former capo. It is believed Trucchio became a member, or soldier in the Gambino family, during the early 2000s. Trucchio allegedly elevated to the rank of captain in 2005, taking over the crew from his father who was sentenced to life imprisonment in 2005. According to prosecutors, Trucchio was active in murder, robbery and extortion within the New York and Miami area, during the 1980s. In December 2002, Trucchio was accused of operating a $30 million-a-year illegal sports betting operation, also for loansharking and drug trafficking. In December 2003, Trucchio was indicted for bank robbery, home invasions and commercial robberies, including 3 murders. In March 2007, Trucchio was sentenced to life in prison for racketeering. In February 2012, Trucchio pleaded guilty to racketeering, drug trafficking, assault, illegal gambling, loansharking, obstruction of justice and extortion, he was sentenced to a further 10 years imprisonment. Truccio was granted compassionate release in November 2024.

New Jersey faction

- Andrew Merola — soldier and former acting capo of the Mitarotonda crew. Merola is connected to the Lucchese crime family's Jersey faction leader Martin Taccetta. Merola's crew operates illegal gambling, loansharking, extortion and labor racketeering. Pleaded guilty to racketeering conspiracy and was sentenced to 11 years in prison. He was released on March 20, 2020.
- Alphonse "Funzi" Sisca — former capo operating a crew in New Jersey. He was a John Gotti ally and a former drug dealing partner of Angelo Ruggiero and Arnold Squitieri. Prior to being convicted in 2006, Sisca had spent 20 of the past 30 years in prison. He was released from prison on September 27, 2010.
- Rosario Spatola — Member of the Cherry Hill Gambinos. His cousin was John Gambino and his brother-in-law was Salvatore Inzerillo.

=== Imprisoned members ===
- Gennaro "Jerry" Bruno — currently serving a 21-year prison sentence for shooting drug dealer Martin Bosshart in the back of his head over a marijuana dispute in 2002 in Queens; convicted for the crime in May 2017. Gambino associate Todd LaBarca was convicted for his role in the murder in 2012 and was sentenced to 23 years in prison. The 82nd Attorney General Eric Holder refused to seek the death penalty for Bruno. He held a top ranking position within the official Gambino crime family crew the Ozone Park Boys. He is a close ally of consigliere Joseph Corozzo and previously sided with his faction in the family.
- Charles Carneglia (born 1946) — soldier. In March 2009, Carneglia was convicted for participating in 4 murders, during 1977, 1983 and twice in 1990. In September 2009, Carneglia was sentenced to life imprisonment for murder, murder conspiracy, felony murder, robbery, kidnapping, marijuana distribution conspiracy, securities fraud conspiracy and extortion.
- John Casablanca (born December 1942) — It is believed Casablanca had participated in at least 5 murders from between 1965 and 1981. Casablanca has been stationed at the Mid-Hudson Forensic Psychiatric Center in New York since 1994.
- Joseph LaForte (born January 1977) — In September 2024, LaForte pleaded guilty to securities fraud, tax crimes and perjury. In March 2025, LaForte was sentenced to over 15 years in prison for a fraud scheme reputedly worth between $400 million and $550 million.
- Aniello "Neil" Lombardo — a soldier who was imprisoned in 2011 being convicted of conspiring to drug trafficking between 2008 and 2011. He was sentenced to 14 years in prison.
- 'Anthony "Big Tony" Moscatiello — soldier possibly during the John Gotti era. In September 2015, Moscatiello was sentenced to life imprisonment for participating in the February 2001 murder of casino magnate Konstantinos "Gus" Boulis.

=== Associates ===
- Norman DuPont — associate. DuPont was the caretaker of the Ravenite Social Club, a Gambino family club on Mulberry Street in Manhattan's Little Italy, and a gofer for John Gotti. He was reportedly involved in extortion, loansharking and gambling rackets. On February 9, 1990, while intoxicated after spending the day celebrating Gotti's third racketeering trial acquittal, DuPont, accompanied by Anthony Persichetti and Guy Zappulla, visited the Vista Car Service in Manahattan's East Village to collect a debt owed to him by the business' owner, Joseph Fabozzi. When DuPont discovered that Fabozzi was not present, he shot and killed car dispatcher Harmon Fuchs as a warning to Fabozzi. DuPont was arrested on September 20, 1991 and charged with second-degree assault after he was allegedly involved in a fight with four off-duty police officers, which left one of the officers with a fractured skull, during the Feast of San Gennaro in Little Italy. On April 13, 1995, DuPont was arrested at his home in Bensonhurst, Brooklyn and charged with Fuchs' murder. Persichetti and Zappulla cooperated with authorities and testified against DuPont. He was convicted of murder and sentenced on March 5, 1996 to life in federal prison. DuPont was incarcerated at the Federal Correctional Institution in Gilmer, West Virginia.
- Steven Kaplan — A family associate who was the manager of The Gold Club, a strip club in Atlanta, Georgia. He employed women to provide sexual services in his club. On August 2, 2001, Kaplan pleaded guilty to one count of racketeering, involving credit card fraud and failure to report prostitution, and agreed to pay a $5 million fine. On August 2, 2002, he was sentenced to 16 months in federal prison.
- Anthony Pandrella — associate. Pandrella was arrested on March 13, 2019 for the robbery and murder of Vincent Zito, a Gambino-affiliated loan shark who was killed on October 26, 2018. It is believed Pandrella shot Zito once in the head at Zito's home in Sheepshead Bay, Brooklyn over a sum of $750,000, which Zito had given to Pandrella from his loanshark business to safekeep, but which Pandrella had refused to return. In October 2022, Pandrella was sentenced by U.S. District Judge Margo Kitsy Brodie to 40 years in prison for robbery, murder and possession of a firearm.
- Raul "Sonny" Suner — associate. Suner is a Gambino associate from Milford, Connecticut. On March 2, 2010, he pleaded guilty to racketeering conspiracy in connection with an illegal sports betting operation in southern Connecticut. Suner was sentenced to June 30, 2010 to nine years in federal prison. He was released on January 8, 2016.
- Peter Tuccio — associate. Howard Beach, Queens mobster Tuccio was initially associated with Ronald "Ronnie G" Giallanzo, an acting capo in the Bonanno family, before he was transferred to the Gambino family and was associated with capo Ignazio Alonga. He was later transferred to the Lucchese family under the direction of his uncle, capo Joseph DeSena. On December 3, 2015, Tuccio and two accomplices, Jonathan Gurino and Gino Gabrielli, carried out an arson attack on the vehicle of a Queens businessman who was being extorted by a capo in the Gambino family. Shortly afterwards, Gabrielli and Tuccio were caught on surveillance video entering Jamaica Hospital to have Gabrielli treated for burns he sustained in the arson. Tuccio served as a chauffeur and bodyguard to Philadelphia family boss Joey Merlino while Merlino was on trial on racketeering charges in New York in 2018. On January 13, 2021, Tuccio pleaded guilty to using fire to commit extortion. He was sentenced by U.S. District Judge LaShann DeArcy Hall on March 2, 2022 to ten years in federal prison and ordered to pay $75,000 in restitution.
- Joseph "Joe the German" Watts — high-ranking associate convicted in 2011 for his part in a 1989 murder conspiracy ordered by John Gotti.

== Former members ==
- William Amendolace — former soldier. Born in 1918. Amendolace was possibly inducted into the Gambino family around 1950 and reported to Gambino family member Joseph Franco. It is noted his brother-in-law Dominick Castore was also a member of the Gambino family. Amendolace's first arrest was in March 1953. According to Gambino family member and informant Alfred Santantonio, he had reported to the FBI in January 1963 regarding Amendolace's membership within the Gambino family, this story was backed up in March 1963 by Colombo family captain and informant Gregory Scarpa. In November 1969, Amendolace was included in the FBI's list of 233 identified Gambino family members. According to several FBI and government reports, Amendolace was close to Carmine Lombardozzi throughout the 1960s. It is noted Amendolace attended the Frank DeCicco funeral in April 1986, also the 1988 funeral of Gambino family captain Nino Gaggi, and one of the last reports regarding Amendolace was noted that he attended the funeral of Gambino family boss John Gotti in 2002. He died in 2012.
- David "Papa Dave" Amodeo — former capo. Born in 1893 in Sicily. Amodeo was allegedly promoted to the status of captain during the 1950s by Carlo Gambino. During the late 1970s, Amodeo stepped down as capo and his crew was taken over by John Angelone. Amodeo died in 1984.
- Anthony "Tough Tony" Anastasio — brother of Albert Anastasia. Anastasio held control of the Brooklyn docks until his death in 1963.
- Giuseppe "Joe" Arcuri — former capo during the John Gotti era. Born in 1913 in Tampa, Florida. Arcuri was allegedly heavily involved in illegal gambling and loan sharking. By the 1980s, he was also involved in construction and labor racketeering in the New York area. He died in December 2007 at the age of 94.
- Vincent "Little Vinny Dirtbag" Artuso — former capo. As a Bronx-based heroin dealer, Artuso was imprisoned following a federal drug trafficking conviction in 1976. Artuso was allegedly one of four gunmen involved in the December 1985 assassination of Gambino family boss Paul Castellano on the orders of John Gotti, but he was never prosecuted in the murder. According to federal witness Sammy Gravano, Artuso failed to fire any bullets into Castellano after his gun reportedly jammed. He was returned to prison for a parole violation in the 1990s, serving two years and relocating to Florida after his release in December 1995. During the 2000s, Artuso was promoted to capo, controlling the family's South Florida faction based in Palm Beach. On October 3, 2008, Artuso was convicted in a racketeering case related to major real estate fraud, along with his son John. He sentenced on December 16, 2008 to nine years in federal prison. Artuso was released on July 28, 2016. He died of natural causes in 2021, aged 76.
- William "Billy Batts" Bentvena — also known as William Devino, Bentvena was a racketeer and drug smuggler. His infamous murder by Thomas DeSimone was portrayed in the film Goodfellas.
- Bartholomew "Bobby" Boriello — born in 1944, Boriello was one of John Gotti's top bodyguards. He was assassinated in 1991 on orders of Lucchese underboss Anthony Casso.
- Thomas "Huck" Carbonaro — born in November 1947. In October 2003, Carbonaro was convicted of conspiring to murder former Gambino family underboss/consigliere Sammy Gravano between 1999 and early 2000. In December 2004, Carbonaro was sentenced to 70 years in prison for conspiring to murder Frank Hydell, an associate of the Gambino family suspected of cooperating with law enforcement who was murdered in 1998, plus for the August 1990 murder of Gambino family soldier Edward Garofalo. Carbonaro died in prison of natural causes on October 23, 2025, aged 77.
- Anthony "Tony C" Carminati — former capo under John Gotti. Born in 1912. Carminati was involved in a wide range of organized crime activities such as illegal gambling, loan sharking, drug trafficking and labor racketeering. It is noted he was possibly inducted during the Carlo Gambino era. In November 1977, he was sentenced to 10 to 12 years after pleading guilty to loan sharking, three counts of conspiring to bribe an undercover police lieutenant and one count of plotting to organize an illicit gambling operation. Carminati died in 1998.
- Riccardo "Richie" Cefalù — born in 1928. Cefalù was the uncle of current Gambino family boss Domenico Cefalù. He moved from Italy to Long Island in 1965. In March 1982, Cefalù was convicted of operating a major heroin ring allegedly bringing in at least 100 pounds of heroin between the summer of 1979 and November 1980 from Italian smuggling routes worth approximately $90 million. In 1982, Cefalu was sentenced to 11 years imprisonment and was released in December 1987. He died in 2020.
- Joseph "Gus" Colazzo — former capo under Carlo Gambino. Born in 1905. In March 1965, he was identified as a capo for the Gambino family. According to a US senate investigation, Colazzo was active in illegal gambling and labor racketeering. He died in 1971.
- Liborio "Bobby Red" Crapanzano — former soldier under John Gotti. Born in 1934. Crapanzano was allegedly active during the 1970s to the early 2000s. He died in 2001.
- Frank Dapolito — former capo under John Gotti. Born in 1923. Dapolito took over the Ettore Zappi crew after his death in July 1986. Dapolito was heavily involved in labor racketeering and served as the manager of at least 5 unions within the New York area. Dapolito died in 1998.
- Roy DeMeo — former soldier who ran the DeMeo crew, which was known for the excessive amount of brutal murders and dismemberment of rival criminals that took place in the "Gemini Lounge", the crew's hideout in Flatlands, Brooklyn. He was shot and killed in 1983.
- Carmine "Charley Wagons" Fatico — born in 1910, Fatico served as a capo and was an early mentor to John Gotti.
- Peter "Petey Pumps" Ferrara — former capo under Carlo Gambino. Ferrara resided in Brooklyn. In 1944, Ferrara was allegedly involved in bootlegging activities and the handling of gasoline rationing stamps with Carlo Gambino. It is noted, in 1948, Ferrara was identified as a bookmaker. Ferrara was allegedly a partner with Genovese capo Michael Coppola in an oil company during the 1950s. According to law enforcement records, Carlo Gambino was driven by Paul Castellano in a 1956 Lincoln vehicle owned by Ferrara, during the infamous 1957 Apalachin meeting. According to files and informant information in 1962, Ferrara was allegedly the largest numbers operator within the New York metropolitan area, around 75% was in Ferrara's control. Ferrara died in 1969.
- Joseph "Joey Cigars" Francolino — former soldier. Born in 1938. In around 1994, after Gambino family capo James Failla was sentenced to prison for murder and racketeering, Francolino was appointed by Gambino family boss John Gotti to take over the New York garbage rackets for the Gambino family. In October 1997, Francolino was found guilty of alleged mob control of the private carting industry in New York, alongside Genovese family capo Alphonse Malangone. Francolino was sentenced to a maximum of 30 years imprisonment. He died in 2021.
- Paolo "Paul" Gambino — born in 1904. Former capo and younger brother of Carlo Gambino. In 1970, he was accused by police of establishing a heroin pipeline in the city of Toronto with Paolo Violi, Rocco Zito and Vincenzo Cotroni. He died in 1973.
- John "Handsome Jack" Giordano — former capo during the John Gotti era. Giordano was also the nephew to former Gambino family underboss Joseph Armone. Giordano and his brother, Joe the Blonde, were inducted into the Gambino family during the late 1970s. It is believed shortly after the Frank DeCicco murder in April 1986, Giordano took over the old Joe Armone crew, as Armone was promoted to underboss of the Gambino family by John Gotti. Giordano was arrested for the November 1989 murder of drug dealer Robert Wyler and racketeering. Giordano received a 12-to-14-year sentence, and was out on bail in 1995. Giordano was the victim of a drive-by shooting which left him paralyzed for the remaining part of his life. He died in February 2009.
- Joseph "Joe the Blond" Giordano — former capo. Giordano was the brother of John "Handsome Jack" Giordano, a Gotti-era capo. He died of lung cancer in 2013.
- Arthur "Artie Chink" Leo — former capo under Carlo Gambino. Born in 1924, Leo was allegedly involved in illegal gambling and shylocking by US senate investigation. He died in August 1965.
- Carmine "The Doctor" Lombardozzi — former capo. Lombardozzi held near-total control over the family's stock market and shylock rackets. Lombardozzi was once described as having a "brilliant mind" for numbers. Lombardozzi had a long criminal history and tallied up numerous arrests.
- George Lombardozzi — former soldier. George Lombardozzi was a nephew of Carmine Lombardozzi and a cousin of Daniel Marino. He was a prominent loanshark during the 1990s and early 2000s, utilizing William Scotto as his debt collector and enforcer, and was at one point acting capo of Marino's crew. Lombardozzi was convicted of distributing extortionate loans in Manhattan, and was released from prison in 2006. He died from natural causes on March 10, 2026, aged 84.
- Pasquale Marsala — born in 1940, Marsala served as a capo under Frank Cali and Lorenzo Mannino's leadership, with operations in Brooklyn and Manhattan. In 1974, he was indicted for his part in a multimillion-dollar illegal gambling operation in which police officers were bribed. He died in 2021.
- Angelo "Cockeyed Angie" Mascia — former capo active within the Yonkers and Bronx area. Born in 1909. Mascia died in 1986.
- Rocco "Rogie" Mazzie — former capo under Carlo Gambino. Born in 1916. Mazzie was allegedly a heroin trafficker. Mazzie was indicted in December 1954 for drug trafficking conspiracy that involved buying, selling and concealing heroin. He died in 1986.
- Anthony "Fat Tony" Morelli — served as soldier, possibly captain, under John Gotti. Born in 1941. In May 1993, Morelli was indicted on a $100 million motor fuel tax evasion scheme.
- Alphonse "Funzi" Mosca — born in 1913. Former soldier during the John Gotti era and major heroin wholesale trafficker who was partnered with the Harlem underworld. He was a confidante of Gambino boss Paul Castellano. He died in 1987.
- Ralph "Ralphie Bones" Mosca — former capo within Queens and the Bronx, during John Gotti's reign. Born in June 1910. Mosca was heavily involved in labor racketeering specifically through the United Brotherhood of Carpenters and Joiners of America and the International Longshore and Warehouse Union. In September 1991, Mosca was indicted for operating a massive gambling business in Manhattan, Brooklyn, Queens, the Bronx, New Jersey and Upstate New York since the 1980s. By February 1993, Mosca was under house arrest after pleading guilty to racketeering and illegal gambling. Mosca died in September 1999.
- Michael "Mickey Boy" Paradiso — former consigliere. Active since the 1960s, Paradiso once assaulted John Gotti during the 1970s. He was later appointed as captain by Gotti in the mid-1980s. Paradiso was suspected of hiring Jimmy Hydell and two other associates in the failed September 1985 murder attempt of Lucchese crime family underboss Anthony Casso. By 1986, he completed his eight-year sentence of the hijacking of two trailer-trucks containing 500 bags of Colombian coffee and was released on $500,000 bail, when he was convicted of operating a major heroin distribution network at Lewisburg Penitentiary. It has been alleged Gotti ordered a contract on his life around late 1987 as retribution for Casso. In 1989, he was acquitted of murder after his own brother accused him of committing a January 1978 murder among nine others. He was paroled in 1998, returned to prison in 1999 on a parole violation then released in 2000. Paradiso was released in 2011 for an unknown crime. In 2016, he and 21 other members and associates of the Gambino, Bonanno and Genovese crime families were indicted as part of an illegal gambling and $15 million marijuana and oxycodone drug operation which stretched from California to New York. Paradiso became consigliere of the family in 2019. He died in February 2026, aged 86.
- Frank "Big Frank" Pasqua Sr. — born in 1923. Former soldier and major drug trafficker with known contacts in the Chicago Outfit. In December 1952, he was arrested in New York for trafficking several kilos of heroin to Chicago from New York on a weekly basis, the district supervisor in Chicago alleged the price of heroin increased by $100 an ounce due to the arrest of Pasqua and his Chicago associates. He was given a four-year prison sentence in 1958 for heroin conspiracy. Pasqua and his son were arrested on 9 December 1982 as part of operation "Major Supplier" which allegedly earned $25,000 per week from 1979 to 1982 and oversaw 15 percent of the heroin distributed wholesale in the city of New York, or about 400 pounds of heroin per year. He was convicted in 1984 for heroin conspiracy.
- Joseph "Don" Paterno — Born in 1923. Paterno allegedly ran the Gambino family's interests in North Jersey and also served as an emissary for Don Carlo Gambino. In 1974, Paterno fled to Florida to avoid testifying before the New Jersey State Commission. In April 1985, he was indicted for ordering two murders. Paterno died in 1988.
- Frank Perrone — former capo under Carlo Gambino. Born in 1909. It is believed Perrone became a captain during the early 1950s. He died in 1983.
- Frank Piccolo — former capo with family operations in Bridgeport, Connecticut. He was shot and killed in 1981 on orders of Paul Castellano, reportedly for his attempt at overtaking Genovese rackets in Connecticut.
- Angelo "Quack Quack" Ruggiero — former capo and close friend of John Gotti, Ruggiero died of cancer in 1989.
- Gaetano Russo — born in Palermo, Sicily in 1891. By 1969, he was identified as a captain in the Gambino family by the federal government. He died in 1970.
- Michelle Giacomo "Jack" Scarpulla — former capo. Born around 1899 in Palermo. During the 1930s, he was arrested for grand larceny and bootlegging. After Carlo Gambino succeeded Anastasia as boss in 1957, Scarpulla succeeded his brother-in-law Joseph Scalice and took over the Bronx crew. During the 1960s, Scarpulla was identified as active in the heroin trade by US senate hearings. He died in 1971.
- Anthony Scotto — former capo and prominent labor racketeer who controlled the Brooklyn waterfront. He died on August 21, 2021.
- Joseph "Joe Rivers" Silesi — former capo. Born in 1897 or 1896. Silesi allegedly became criminally active during the 1920s. Silesi allegedly oversaw the Gambino family interests in Havana, Cuba for Gambino family boss Albert Anastasia during the 1950s. After Fidel Castro came into power, Silesi fled to Florida and handled the Gambino family rackets. Silesi died in 1987.
- Pietro "Peter" Stincone — former capo. Born in 1897 in Sicily. During the 1950s, it is believed Stincone was promoted to capo. In 1969, Stincone was identified as a capo by a US Senate report. He died in 1977.
- Arthur "Artie Todd" Tortorello — born in 1913. Former soldier in the crew of Carmine Lombardozzi. He was heavily involved in stock fraud notable for his 1964 arrest which saw investors lose over $2 million in a bank and stock fraud case. He died in 1980.
- Mario Traina — former capo during the John Gotti era. Born in January 1915. Traina's father allegedly served as a captain under Don Carlo Gambino. Traina died in 1994 at the age of 79.
- Anthony "Tony Pepsi" Vitta — born in 1938. Former soldier and confidante of Joseph N. Gallo. In December 1987, he was sentenced to 10 years in prison and fined $250,000 for obstruction of justice, racketeering and the extortion of a photography color laboratory and a Bronx construction firm. He died in 2018.
- Anthony "Charlie Brush" Zangarra — former capo under Gambino. Born in 1924. Zangarra was possibly inducted into the Gambino family in 1963. In 1965, an investigation by the US senate identified Zangarra active in shylocking and illegal gambling. He died in 1999.
- Joseph "Rye" Zingaro — former capo who served under Carlo Gambino and Paul Castellano. Born in 1912. Zingaro was reportedly active in the New York and New Jersey area, and was involved in drug trafficking and racketeering. It is noted he was involved with Genovese capo John Ardito contracting and subcontracting projects in the Bronx and Westchester area. Zingaro died in 1995.

== Former associates ==
- Henry H. "Harry the Horse" Saltzstein — former associate. Saltzstein became involved in labor racketeering in the early 1950s. In 1954, he incorporated SGS Associates, a corporate front for the Gambino family in labor-relations. SGS dissolved in May 1965 after Carlo Gambino's role as an equal partner in the firm was exposed by a federal investigation.

== Government informants and witnesses ==
- Alphonso "The Peacemaker" Attardi – the first confirmed Gambino crime family informant. Attardi was born in Sicily in 1897 and allegedly joined the Sicilian Mafia before immigrating to New York in 1919. He became a bootlegger and joined the D'Aquila gang during the 1920s – later evolved into the Gambino crime family. It is noted that Attardi was heavily involved in the narcotic trade from the 1930s to late 1940s. By 1947, he was an informant for the FBN and by 1952, Attardi was informing on the American Mafia, he disappeared shortly thereafter. Attardi gave an interview to columnist Jack Anderson in 1968. Depending on the sources, he died in 1970 or 1972 in Suffolk County, New York.
- Alfredo "Freddie the Sidge" Santantonio – he was initiated into the Gambino family in 1953. Santantonio was reportedly very close to Albert Anastasia and he was also the brother-in-law of Jack Parisi, a Gambino soldier and former Murder, Inc gunman. It is believed Santantonio became an informant in 1961. In 1962, he avoided a prison sentence for attempting to sell stolen bonds, with two other criminals. On July 11, 1963, he was shot 5 times and killed by two men whilst inside of a Brooklyn florist shop.
- Wilfred "Willie Boy" Johnson – former associate and confidant of John Gotti. He could never become a member of the Gambino family due to his Native-American heritage, for which he was named "Wahoo". Johnson became an informer in 1966 for the FBI due to apparent dissatisfaction with the mob. During a public hearing in 1985, federal prosecutor Diane Giacalone revealed that Johnson was cooperating with law enforcement. Johnson immediately refused to enter the Witness Protection Program and was subsequently murdered on August 29, 1988. Bonanno crime family hitmen Vincent "Kojak" Giattino and Thomas Pitera murdered Johnson as a favor for Gotti, Johnson was reportedly shot 19 times and found face-down in a pool of his own blood.
- Arthur "Fat Artie" Berardelli – former associate affiliated with Paul Castellano. In around July or August 1973, Berardelli was arrested by the FBI for fraud and later testified against Castellano and Angelo Scarpulla during a loansharking trial.
- Dominick Montiglio – former associate who testified in 1983. He attended the wake of Gambino underboss Frank Scalise in 1957 with his uncle and future Gambino capo Nino Gaggi. In 1973, he met Roy DeMeo, then an associate in the Gambino family, and Chris Rosenberg. He served as an errand boy for his uncle which required him to collect payments from the DeMeo crew. DeMeo had offered him the opportunity of selling narcotics however Gaggi ordered Montiglio not to get involved. Montiglio was involved in the April 1975 attempted murder of Vincent Governara. He fled to California in 1979 after believing Roy DeMeo and his uncle Nino Gaggi were planning to murder him, after Gambino boss Paul Castellano heard gossip of Montiglio selling and using heroin. His testimony in 1983 led Gaggi to be sentenced to 5 years in prison, where he would die in 1988. His testimony has brought down at least 60 American Mafia mobsters, with a confirmed number of 56 people before vanishing into the Witness Protection Program in 1983.
- James Cardinali – born in 1950. He is a former Gambino crime family associate who testified against John Gotti in December 1986. In 1975, he was given a four-year sentence for possession of weapons and drugs. Cardinali first met Gotti at the Clinton correctional facility in the late 1970s before he was transferred to Attica and Gotti to Green Haven. In August 1983, Cardinali was sentenced to serve a 5 to 10 year prison sentence for the manslaughter stabbing of Michael Phillips in May 1981. In June 1984, Cardinali signed an agreement to serve as a government witness. Cardinali was released from the program in July 1989 by confiding his identity. He admitted to participating in 5 murders.
- Dominick "Big Dom" LoFaro – former associate. In 1983 or 1984, depending on the source, LoFaro attempted to sell a kilogram of heroin to undercover FBI and DEA agents, he shortly became an informer after his arrest due to the fact that he faced over 20 years in prison. In 1986, he was one out of three American Mafia informers to testify against Gambino boss John Gotti, alongside James Cardinali and Colombo crime family associate, Salvatore Polisi. LoFaro received probation for his testimony against Gotti. On 7 January 1987, he admitted to fabricating stories in order to make a deal with the government. He later admitted to murdering Salvatore Calabria at his home in 1982, and served as an accomplice in the murder of Calabria's wife in 1983. Also during January 1987, he pled guilty to attempted murder, illegal gambling and loan sharking. He died in 2003.
- Salvatore "Sammy the Bull" Gravano – the first underboss to break his blood oath. Gravano admitted to the killings of 19 people and cooperated with the government in 1991. He also admitted to fixing John Gotti's trials, which led Gotti to be called "the Teflon Don" due to his evasion from prosecution. He was released from prison in 1994 and immediately entered the Witness Protection Program which allowed him to flee to Arizona under protection. Gravano gave several publicised interviews, including with Dianne Sawyer, however Peter Gotti ordered a death-contract on Gravano after his 1999 Vanity Fair interview. The plan consisted of murdering Gravano with a land mine or shooting him with a hunting rifle. After his 2002 drug-related arrest, the assigned Gambino hitmen, Thomas "Huck" Carbonaro and Eddie Garafola, planned to send a nail bomb into his prison cell via mail. Gravano was released from prison in 2017.
- Dominic "Fat Dom" Borghese – former soldier. He served in the crew of Jackie D'Amico and later John A. Gotti. Borghese was very close with John A. Gotti, he even attended his wedding in 1990 and were partners together in several lucrative Staten Island illegal bookmaking operations; he later testified against him in 1998. Borghese admitted to helping dispose of 2 murdered bodies however he was unable to dig underneath due to the fact that he weighed over 400 pounds. He entered the Witness Protection Program in 1995. He testified against high-ranking Gambino associate Joe Watts.
- Andrew DiDonato – he was a former associate of the Gambino family and protegee of former Gambino acting boss and captain, Nicholas Corozzo. DiDonato was suspected of participating in 2 murders. He became an informant in 1997 and later testified against John A. Gotti.
- Craig DePalma – son of deceased Gambino acting captain Gregory DePalma. DePalma was a soldier and was proposed for membership by John Gotti, he later served in the crew of John A. Gotti. He cooperated in 2000 and died in December 2010 from eight years spent in a coma after a failed jailhouse suicide in 2002.
- Michael "Mickey Scars" DiLeonardo – former Gambino capo. DiLeonardo was active since the 1960s. His brother was shot to death in 1981 in a dispute related with the Gambino and Colombo crime families, DiLeonardo was denied permission to avenge the murder by boss Paul Castellano. He was inducted into the Gambino crime family alongside John A. Gotti on December 24, 1988. In 1989, he helped arrange the murder of publisher and sanitation business owner Fred Weiss, who was shot to death by the New Jersey DeCavalcante crime family as a favor to John J. Gotti. He became a government witness shortly after his June 2002 arrest; he was accused of labor racketeering, extortion, loan sharking, witness tampering, and the murder of Fred Weiss. He later testified against former Gambino boss Peter Gotti, captain Louis Vallario, hitman Michael Yanotti, Richard G. Gotti and the brother of John Gotti, Richard V. Gotti. His testimony has secured the convictions of more than 80 American Mafia members and associates.
- Frank "Frankie Fapp" Fappiano – former soldier. He allegedly became a Gambino soldier during the early 1990s and decided to cooperate in 2002. Fappiano has a brother in the Colombo crime family. He admitted to corruption, bribery and the extortion of construction companies based in Manhattan and Brooklyn, with the Genovese crime family. During one incident, Anthony Graziano, the consigliere of the Bonanno crime family, managed to obtain the "kickback" for a $22 million building contract at MDC Brooklyn, which the Gambino family also rivalled for.
- Primo Cassarino – former soldier and was part of Anthony Ciccone's crew. He was convicted of racketeering and extortion in 2003, alongside former boss Peter Gotti and several other Gambino members. In 2004, he was additionally convicted of racketeering, money-laundering and for the extortion of action-film star Steven Seagal. Cassarino became a government witness in 2005 after he was sentenced to over 11 years in prison. In 2005, he confessed about the infiltration of the International Longshoremen's Association. He testified in the trial of Genovese capo Lawrence Ricci in November 2005, who was later murdered a few weeks after, and also testified against Gambino soldier Anthony "Todo" Anastasio.
- John Alite – former associate who testified against John A. Gotti and hitman Charles Carneglia. Alite pleaded guilty to two murders, four murder conspiracies, at least eight shootings and two attempted shootings as well as armed home invasions and armed robberies in New York, New Jersey, Pennsylvania and Florida. His testimony against Carneglia resulted in the defendant receiving a life sentence after being found guilty of four murders. On April 26, 2011, Alite was sentenced to 10 years in prison, however was released in January 2012. During the late 2010s and 2020s, Alite starred in several prolific American Mafia based documentaries which were shown on YouTube and Netflix such as Fear City: New York vs the Mafia in 2020 along with former Colombo family captain, Michael Franzese, The Mafia with Trevor McDonald in 2015 which also starred Franzese, former Gambino family captain, Michael DiLeonardo and former Philadelphia family boss, Ralph Natale, and Mob War: Philadelphia vs. The Mafia in 2025 which focused on the lives of former Philadelphia Mafia family bosses, Joey Merlino and John Stanfa. In 2025, Alite was elected as a councilman in the borough of Englishtown in New Jersey. In June 2026, Alite was arrested on charges for extortion, corporate misconduct, loansharking and terroristic threats; at his home such weapons as metal knuckle dusters, a baton, six baseball bats and over 20 knives and switchblades were seized.
- Joseph "Little Joe" D'Angelo – former soldier who cooperated in 2005. D'Angelo was once the driver for John A. Gotti. He testified against Gotti alongside former Bonanno crime family captain Dominick Cicale in 2009. He confessed to 2 murders and served as the driver during the attempted murder of Curtis Sliwa in 1992. Former United States federal judge Shira Scheindlin announced at his July 2012 trial that D'Angelo's testimony has brought down at least 40 mobsters, he was sentenced to four years time already served.
- Lewis Kasman – former associate. He was close to the Gotti family. John Gotti considered Kasman as a son. He cooperated in 2005. In 2015, he was arrested on felony grand theft and fraud charges in Florida. Kasman reportedly lived in a $900,000 mansion on Delray Beach.
- Robert Mormando – former soldier and hitman for the Gambino crime family. In October 2009, Mormando became the first mobster to admit in open court that he is gay. He was involved in the 2003 shooting of a Queens bagel store owner.
- Nicholas "Nicky Skins" Stefanelli – former soldier who was active in New Jersey, he was a member of Nicholas Corozzo's crew. He became an informant in 2010. Stefanelli reportedly murdered an informant in February 2011, Joseph Rossi, who he blamed for forcing him into becoming an informer. He committed suicide two days after he murdered Rossi, he was found dead in a hotel room.
- Anthony Ruggiano Jr. – former associate and proposed member. He is the son of Gambino captain Anthony Ruggiano Sr, who died in 1999. He lured his brother-in-law, Frank "Geeky" Boccia, to his death in 1988. Ruggiano spent three days in prison for his role in the murder after his cooperation in 2012. Ruggiano later testified against high-ranking members of the Gambino family, including Dominick Pizzonia, Bartolomeo "Bobby Glasses" Vernace and hitman Charles Carneglia.
- Giovanni "Johnny" Monteleone – former associate who turned informer in 2013. Sopranos actor Tony Darrow asked Monteleone and Gambino soldier Joseph Orlando to recover money from a debt owed to him. Facing extortion charges, it was revealed in 2013 that Monteleone had cooperated, he received no prison time.

== Factions and territories ==
The Gambino family operates primarily in New York City and the surrounding metropolitan area, including New Jersey, as well as New England. The organization also has links to Florida, Nevada, and California. The Gambino family is primarily involved in labor racketeering in the construction industry, but also obtains substantial profits from gambling, loansharking, pornography, credit card and stock fraud, fuel-tax scams, and trucking-related extortion in the garment industry.

- New York – The family is based in Brooklyn and operates in all five boroughs of New York City as well the suburbs of Long Island and Westchester County.
- New Jersey – The family operates in the Northern New Jersey counties of Bergen, Passaic, and Essex, as well as in Trenton, and Atlantic City in Southern New Jersey. In 2004, it was reported that two Gambino crews operated in New Jersey.
- Connecticut – The family is the preeminent crime organization operating in Fairfield County, where it has operated since at least the 1980s. Bridgeport has traditionally served as the Gambino base in Connecticut. The family has also cooperated with the Genovese family in New Haven County.
- Florida – The Gambino family's Florida faction operates in Tampa and the South Florida counties of Broward, Palm Beach and Dade.

=== Crews ===
- Cherry Hill Gambinos – a Sicilian faction of the family headed by John Gambino and based in Cherry Hill, New Jersey.
- Howard Beach Crew – based in Howard Beach, Queens.
- Los Angeles Crew – based in Los Angeles. Members operating in Los Angeles include Tommaso "Tommy" Gambino and Joe Isgro.
- Ozone Park Boys – based in Ozone Park, Queens and formerly led by Ronnie Trucchio.

==== Defunct ====
- Baltimore Crew

=== Sicilian faction ===
The Sicilian faction of the Gambino family, known as the Cherry Hill Gambinos, is a group of Sicilian mafiosi operating as an arm of the family, based in Brooklyn and South Jersey. Specializing in heroin trafficking, the faction's most prominent members have included Giovanni "John" Gambino, Giuseppe "Joe" Gambino, and Rosario "Sal" Gambino.

Gambino boss Carlo Gambino created an alliance between the Gambino family and three Sicilian clans: the Inzerillos, the Spatolas and the Di Maggios. Carlo Gambino's relatives controlled the Inzerillo clan under Salvatore Inzerillo in Passo di Ragano, a neighborhood in Palermo, Sicily. Salvatore Inzerillo coordinated the major heroin trafficking from Sicily to the US, bringing his cousins John, Giuseppe and Rosario Gambino to the US to supervise the operation. The Gambino brothers ran a Cafe on 18th Avenue in Bensonhurst and took their name Cherry Hill Gambinos from Cherry Hill, New Jersey. The Gambino family in America began increasing in size with more Sicilian members.

News reports in July 2019 indicated that a recent police investigation confirmed strong links between the Palermo area Cosa Nostra and the Gambino crime family in New York. According to Italian newspaper La Repubblica, "Off they go, through the streets of Passo di Rigano, Boccadifalco, Torretta and at the same time, Brooklyn, Staten Island, New Jersey. Because from Sicily to the US, the old mafia has returned".

== Alliances with other criminal groups ==
=== The Gambino-Lucchese-Genovese ===
The Gambino-Lucchese-Genovese alliance (1953–1985) between Carlo Gambino, Tommy Lucchese, and Vito Genovese began with a plot to take over the Mafia Commission by murdering family bosses Frank Costello and Albert Anastasia. At that time, Gambino was Anastasia's new underboss and Vito Genovese was the underboss for Costello. Their first target was Costello on May 2, 1957. Costello survived the assassination attempt, but immediately decided to retire as boss in favor of Genovese. Their second target was Anastasia on October 25, 1957. Stephen Grammauta, a soldier in the Gambino family, and an associate, Joseph Cahill, murdered Anastasia in a Manhattan barber shop, opening the war for Gambino to become the new boss of the now-Gambino crime family. After assuming power, Gambino started conspiring with Lucchese to remove their former ally Genovese. In 1959, with the assistance of Lucky Luciano, Costello, and Meyer Lansky, Genovese was arrested and Gambino assumed full control with Lucchese of the Mafia Commission. Under Gambino and Lucchese, the Commission pushed Bonanno boss Joseph Bonanno out of power, triggering an internal war in that family. In the 1960s, the Commission backed the Gallo brothers in their rebellion against Profaci family boss Joe Profaci. In 1962, Gambino's oldest son Thomas married Lucchese's daughter, strengthening the Gambino and Lucchese family alliance. Lucchese gave Gambino access into the New York airports rackets he controlled, and Gambino allowed Lucchese into some of their rackets. After Lucchese's death in July 1967, Gambino used his power over the Commission to appoint Carmine Tramunti as the new Lucchese family leader. Gambino later continued the alliance with Tramunti's successor, Anthony Corallo. After Gambino's death, new Gambino boss Paul Castellano continued the Lucchese alliance. In 1985, the original Gambino-Lucchese alliance dissolved when John Gotti ordered Castellano's assassination and took power in the Gambino family without Commission approval.

=== The Gambino-Lucchese ===
The Gambino-Lucchese alliance (1999–present) was initiated by acting Lucchese boss Steven Crea in 1999. The two families extorted the construction industry and made millions of dollars in bid-rigging. In early 2002, Lucchese capo John Capra worked with Gambino acting boss Arnold Squitieri, acting underboss Anthony Megale, and Bronx-based acting capo Gregory DePalma. The group was involved in illegal gambling and extortion activities in Westchester County, New York. The members were arrested in 2005 leading to the revelation that Gambino acting capo DePalma had allowed an FBI agent Joaquín García (known as Jack Falcone) work undercover with his crew since 2002. In late 2008, Gambino family acting capo Andrew Merola teamed with Lucchese Jersey faction acting boss Martin Taccetta in an illegal gambling ring, shaking down unions, and extorting car dealerships. Merola was indicted in 2008 and Taccetta was returned to prison in 2009.

=== The Gambino-Bonanno ===
The Gambino-Bonanno alliance (1991–2004) started with John Gotti and new Bonanno boss Joseph Massino. As a member of the Mafia Commission, Gotti helped Massino regain the Bonanno commission seat that was lost in the early 1980s. The Gambino family influenced the Bonanno family to give up narcotics trafficking and return to more traditional Cosa Nostra crimes (loan sharking, gambling, stock fraud, etc.) By the late 1990s, the Bonannos had become almost as strong as the Gambinos.

=== The Gambino-Westies ===
The Gambino-Westies alliance (1977–1992) resulted from an ongoing war between the Genovese family and the Westies, an Irish-American street gang in the Hell's Kitchen section of Manhattan. Genovese front boss Anthony "Fat Tony" Salerno wanted to seize control of lucrative construction rackets at the new Jacob Javits Convention Center from the Westies. When the Westies balked, Salerno ordered the murder of the top gang leaders. Eventually, the Genovese family invited the Gambinos to broker a peace agreement with the Westside Gang. As part of this agreement, the Westies formed an alliance with Gambino soldier Roy DeMeo.

=== The Gambino-Corleonesi ===
This association was revealed in May 2019 when news reports indicated that a Cosa Nostra insider revealed that John Gotti of the Gambino family had sent one of their explosives experts to Sicily to work with the Corleonesi. This individual allegedly helped plan the Capaci bombing that was set by Giovanni Brusca to kill prosecuting judge Giovanni Falcone and his team. One mafia expert was surprised that the two groups would cooperate because the American Cosa Nostra was affiliated with the rivals of the Corleonesi. But another expert said the joint effort was understandable. "It may be that the Gambinos at a certain point recognised that the Corleonesi had been victorious in the war between rival families in Sicily ... there is nothing unusual in the traffic of personnel and ideas across the Atlantic ... they were cousin organisations," according to John Dickie, professor of Italian studies at University College London and the author of Mafia Republic – Italy's Criminal Curse.

== List of murders committed by the Gambino crime family ==
Name	Date	Reason
Philip Mangano	April 19, 1951	Mangano served as the consigliere for the Gambino family, under boss Vincent Mangano, his elder brother, from between 1931 and 1951. The body of his elder brother, Vincent Mangano, has never been found, however the body of Philip Mangano was found in Jamaica Bay in Long Island with 3 bullets inside of his neck and face. The murder's of Philip Mangano and Vincent Mangano were believed to have been orchestrated by Albert Anastasia with Anastasia replacing Vincent Mangano as family boss.
Vincent Mangano	April 19, 1951	Mangano served as the boss of the modern day Gambino family from between 1931 and 1951. Mangano disappeared in April 1951 and Albert Anastasia succeeded him as the family boss, Anastasia was also allegedly responsible for the Mangano murder.
Albert Anastasia	October 25, 1957	Anastasia was reportedly the boss of the Gambino family prior to his murder. It is believed Carlo Gambino and Vito Genovese orchestrated and planned the murder of Anastasia. It has been alleged that Gambino wanted to remove Anastasia as Gambino wished to succeed him as the boss of the family, and Genovese wanted Anastasia dead so that in turn Genovese could become the family boss of his crime family as Anastasia was a strong ally of Frank Costello, the predecessor of Genovese, and that Genovese also marked Costello for death with Vincent Gigante as the shooter, Costello ultimately survived the shooting and retired from the Genovese family. Anastasia was shot 10 times located at 870 7th Avenue in New York at the Park Sheraton Hotel in Manhattan. Gambino family member Stephen Grammauta may have participated in the murder of Anastasia, although former Colombo family members Carmine "Junior" Persico and Joseph "Crazy Joe" Gallo claimed credit for his murder.
Alan Seth Kaiser	August 5, 1977	16-year-old Kaiser was accompanying 21-year-year-old Aldo Candido, a member of a gang which had broken the ankle of Gambino soldier Sammy Gravano during a fight at an afterhours club the week before, while they walked along Kings Highway at West Eighth Street in Coney Island, Brooklyn. Kaiser was shotgunned in the chest and face by Liborio Milito as Gravano and Milito attempted to kill Candido in a drive-by shooting. Candido escaped with a superficial wound.
Nicholas "Little Nicky" Scibetta	1978	22-year-old Gambino associate Scibetta had committed several underworld infractions, including insulting the daughter of capo George DeCicco. He was killed and dismembered in Bensonhurst, Brooklyn by Frank DeCicco and Sammy Gravano on the orders of Paul Castellano.
John James "Johnny Keys" Simone	September 17, 1980	69-year-old Philadelphia family capo Simone had supported the unauthorized March 21, 1980 assassination of Philadelphia boss Angelo Bruno and was subsequently condemned to death by the Commission. Gambino boss Paul Castellano designated the contract to soldier Sammy Gravano. Simone was abducted from the Sky View Country Club in Washington Township, New Jersey and driven to New York, where he was shot by Gravano and Liborio Milito. Joseph D'Angelo served as an accomplice (driver). Simone's body was found in a wooded lot near the West Shore Expressway in Travis, Staten Island, shot three times in the head.
Frank "Frankie Stale" Stillitano	February 14, 1981	28-year-old Stillitano led a gang which extorted tavern and restaurant owners in the Chambersburg neighborhood of Trenton, New Jersey without the authorization of Gambino soldier Nicholas Russo. On March 24, 1979, he shot and killed Russo's 42-year-old son Michael Russo. At Russo's request, Sammy Gravano orchestrated the murder of Stillitano with the sanction of Paul Castellano. Gravano enlisted members of the Philadelphia family to carry out the killing. After 23 months in hiding, Stillitano was abducted and executed. His body was found in the trunk of a rental car at Philadelphia Airport on February 26, 1981, shot behind the left ear and left knee.
Frank Fiala	June 27, 1982	37-year-old Fiala, the boss of a Czechoslovak gang, had signed an agreement to purchase the Plaza Suite, a discotheque at 2937 86th Street in Gravesend, Brooklyn, from Gambino soldier Sammy Gravano, Genovese family member Salvatore Luisi, and Vincent Gugliaro of the Colombo family. Two days before the sale was to be completed, Fiala called Gravano and Edward Garofalo to a meeting in the office of the discotheque, where he threatened them with a machine gun. That evening, Fiala was ambushed by two masked gunmen while leaving the Plaza Suite, pinned to the ground by Joseph D'Angelo and shot five times in the head by Liborio Milito. Nicholas Mormando drove the shooters from the scene.
John Santiago	June 4, 1983	36-year-old Gambino associate Santiago was having an affair with the wife of the brother of Joseph D'Angelo, another associate. D'Angelo shot Santiago through each eye. He was found dead behind the wheel of a stolen car two blocks from his home in Borough Park, Brooklyn.
Paul Castellano and Thomas Bilotti	December 16, 1985	70-year-old Gambino boss Castellano and 45-year-old underboss Bilotti were killed in a coup orchestrated by capo John Gotti, allowing Gotti to take control of the crime family. The pair were gunned down by a hit team, consisting of John Carneglia, Edward Lino, Salvatore Scala and Vincent Artuso, outside Sparks Steak House in Midtown Manhattan, where they had been lured by Frank DeCicco. Angelo Ruggiero, Joseph Watts, Ignazio Alogna and Anthony Rampino served as backup shooters, while Gotti and Sammy Gravano directed and observed the shooting from a nearby car.
Nicholas Mormando	January 1986	Gambino associate Mormando reportedly had a falling out with Sammy Gravano and became addicted to crack cocaine. According to Gravano, soldier Joseph Paruta shot him in the back of the head.
Augustus "Big Gus" Sclafani	March 1, 1986	A contract was placed on the life of Gambino associate Sclafani after She accused Frank DeCicco of being an informant. Gambino hitman Joseph Watts shot and stabbed Sclafani to death in a club in Little Italy, Manhattan on orders from new Gambino boss John Gotti.
Robert DiBernardo	June 5, 1986	John Gotti had Angelo Ruggiero arrange the murder of Gambino capo DiBernardo, who was shot and killed by Gambino family soldier Joseph Paruta. Sammy Gravano was also in attendance of the murder. Gotti became paranoid of the heavily involved pornographer gangster with his ties to the Genovese family and not showing up to meetings called on by John Gotti.
Francessco Oliveri	May 3, 1988	Gambino soldier Oliveri was found shot to death for previously murdering a Gambino made-man. Killed by the Gravano crew.
Wilfred "Willie Boy" Johnson	August 29, 1988	52-year old Gambino associate Johnson was shot around 20 times and found face-down in the street, he was killed by Tommy Pitera and an associate of the Bonanno crime family for secretly recording FBI conversations for 19 years.
Thomas Spinelli	1989	Gambino associate Spinelli was shot to death after he testified before a federal grand jury and it was alleged he was an FBI informant.
Edward Garofalo	August 9, 1990	Gambino soldier Garofalo was a big player in the construction business. In 1989, he found himself in a bitter dispute with Sammy Gravano, who ordered Garofalo to be killed.
Louis DiBono	October 4, 1990	Gambino soldier DiBono was murdered because he was stealing from the Gambino crime family and Gravano saw a chance to get revenge on an old enemy after years of rivalry.
Jose Rivera	December 14, 1990	Charles Carneglia shot and killed armored truck guard Jose Rivera, who was gunned down while delivering money to Kennedy Airport. Carneglia and an accomplice allegedly flee with $65,000.
Bruce Gotterup	November 20, 1991	Gambino associate Gotterup was killed by John Burke, another Gambino associate; the murder was carried out after Gotterup was suspected by Burke and other mobsters of stealing from associates and showing disrespect towards a ranking member of the family.
Thomas Uva and Rosemarie Uva	December 24, 1992	Thomas and Rosemarie Uva robbed several mafia social clubs and were killed for this motive by Dominick Pizzonia in the 1992 Christmas Eve shooting to their car in the intersection of Woodhaven Boulevard and 103rd Avenue.
David Stuart	March 11, 1994	Stuart, a millionaire garment trucking executive who admitted in 1992 to being part of an illegal cartel controlled by the Gambino and Lucchese families to control garment industry trucking, disappeared in mid-1994.
Steven Aiello	September 15, 1995	Aiello an alibi witness for criminal activity in the Gambino/Genovese families prior to September 1995. His testimony helped free a man charged with killing the son of a Genovese crime figure at the direction of the Gambinos. Investigators believe one of the two families may have been involved in Aiello's disappearance due to his suspected perjury on the witness stand.
Vincent D'Angola and Jami Schneider	October 22, 1995	Gambino associate D'Angola and Schneider, D'Angola's girlfriend, were found shot to death at D 'Angola's Fort Lauderdale apartment for skimming profits from the Gambino family.
Robert Arena and Thomas Meranga	January 27, 1996	Both were killed when a hail of 40 bullets were fired into their car in Mill Basin, Brooklyn. Andrew DiDonato said Arena, a Lucchese crime family associate, was targeted because he was suspected of killing a Gambino associate and muscling in on a rival crew's turf in a festering dispute between the two families, while Meranga was an innocent bystander in the wrong place. Michael Yannotti was a suspected on the two murders but he was acquitted in 2005.
Gus Boulis	February 6, 2001	Boulis was murdered by Gambino family member Anthony "Big Tony" Moscatiello and his associates, Anthony "Little Tony" Ferrari and John "Pudgy" Fiorillo, as Boulis refused to share proceeds from his casino-boat business with the Gambino family.
Martin "Marty" Bosshart	January 2, 2002	Gambino associate Bosshart was shot and killed by Gennaro "Jerry" Bruno for refusing to share profits from his drug operation to the family and the Gambino family administration may had viewed Bosshart as a possible law enforcement cooperator, later in May 2016, Bruno was sentenced to 21 years in prison for the murder.
Joe Gurino	October 30, 2003	Gambino associate Gurino was shot to death in Florida by his business owner whom owned a grocery store and claimed self-defense. Gurino was formerly associated with John Gotti during the 1980s and he was acquitted of a murder charge in 1984.

== Media adaptations ==
The Gambino family has been featured in several films. The 1994 film Getting Gotti showcases a 1980s prosecution of Gambino boss John Gotti (portrayed by Tony Denison). Witness to the Mob was a made-for-television movie about the life of Gambino underboss turned FBI informant Sammy Gravano. In the 2001 TV movie, Boss of Bosses, actor Chazz Palminteri portrays Gambino boss Paul Castellano. In the 1996 TV movie Gotti, actor Armand Assante portrays Gambino boss John Gotti. In the movie Goodfellas, Gambino family made member William "Billy Batts" DeVino (played by Frank Vincent) is killed in a fight with Thomas DeSimone (portrayed as "Tommy DeVito" by Joe Pesci), a Lucchese crime family associate. The 2018 film Gotti, a commercial and critical flop, stars John Travolta in the titular role.

The 2017 HBO series The Deuce features three fictional members of the Gambino crime family as a major part of the series' plot: underboss Carmine Patriccia (played by James Ciccone), (Note: Given the time period in which The Deuce takes place (the 1970s and 1980s), it is heavily implied that Carmine Patriccia is based on legendary Gambino crime family underboss Aniello Dellacroce (who was underboss of the Gambino crime family from 1965 until his death in 1985).) capo Rudy Pipilo (played by Michael Rispoli), and soldier Tommy Longo (played by Daniel Sauli).

== See also ==
- Crime in New York City
- Italians in New York City
- List of Italian Mafia crime families

== Sources ==
=== Books ===
- Mustain, Gene; Capeci, Jerry (1988). Mob Star: The Story of John Gotti. Indianapolis: Alpha Books. ISBN 0-02-864416-6.
- Kurins, Andris; O'Brien, Joseph F. (1991). Boss of Bosses: The Fall of the Godfather: The FBI and Paul Castellano. New York City: Simon & Schuster. ISBN 9780671708153.
- Mustain, Gene; Capeci, Jerry (1992). Murder Machine: A True Story of Murder, Madness, and the Mafia. New York: Onyx. ISBN 9780091941116.
- Blum, Howard (1993). Gangland: How The FBI Broke the Mob. New York City: Simon & Schuster. ISBN 0-671-68758-1.
- Davis, John H. (1993). Mafia Dynasty: The Rise and Fall of the Gambino Crime Family. New York: HarperCollins. ISBN 978-0-06-016357-0.
- Jacobs, James B.; Panarella, Christopher; Worthington, Jay (1994). Busting the Mob: The United States vs. Cosa Nostra. New York City: NYU Press. ISBN 978-0-8147-4230-3.
- Mustain, Gene; Capeci, Jerry (1996). Gotti: The Rise and Fall. New York: Signet. ISBN 9780091943172.
- Maas, Peter (1997). Underboss: Sammy the Bull Gravano's Story of Life in the Mafia. New York City: HarperCollins Publishers. ISBN 978-0-06-093096-7.
- Capeci, Jerry (2002). The Complete Idiot's Guide to the Mafia. Indianapolis: Alpha Books. ISBN 978-0-02-864225-3.
- Raab, Selwyn (2005). Five Families: The Rise, Decline, and Resurgence of America's Most Powerful Mafia Empires. New York: St. Martin's Press. ISBN 978-0-312-30094-4.
- Ward, Nathan (2010). Dark Harbor: The War for the New York Waterfront. New York City: Farrar, Straus and Giroux. ISBN 9780374286224.

=== News articles ===
- Eastern District of New York, U.S. Attorney's Office (October 6, 2022). "Gambino Crime Family Associate Sentenced to 40 Years in Prison for Murder and Robbery of Brooklyn Man". Justice.gov.

=== Reports ===
- Lane, Arthur S. (1980). Twelfth Annual Report (PDF) (Report). State of New Jersey Commission of Investigation. Archived from the original (PDF) on December 11, 2025 – via Government of New Jersey.
- Lane, Arthur S. (1981). Thirteenth Annual Report (PDF) (Report). State of New Jersey Commission of Investigation. Archived from the original (PDF) on December 11, 2025 – via Government of New Jersey.
- Thurmond, Strom (1988). Organized Crime in America (PDF) (Report). National Institute of Justice – via United States Department of Justice.
- Zazzali, James R. (September 1990). 21st Annual Report (PDF) (Report). State of New Jersey Commission of Investigation. Archived from the original (PDF) on June 1, 2021 – via Government of New Jersey.
- Richardson, A. (May 1991). Outlaw Motorcycle Gangs – USA Overview (PDF) (Report). State of California Department of Justice, Bureau of Organized Crime and Criminal Intelligence. Archived from the original (PDF) on May 26, 2023 – via United States Department of Justice.
- Schiller, Francis E. (May 2004). The Changing Face of Organized Crime in New Jersey (PDF) (Report). State of New Jersey Commission of Investigation. Archived from the original (PDF) on April 17, 2016 – via Government of New Jersey.
