= Anthony Ciccone =

American mobster

Anthony "Sonny" Ciccone
- Born: July 19, 1934 (age 92)
- Allegiance: Gambino crime family
- Conviction: Extortion

Details
- State: New York

Anthony "Sonny" Ciccone (born July 19, 1934) is a New York City mobster and a captain of the Gambino crime family. For over twenty years, Ciccone controlled the Staten Island and Brooklyn waterfronts.

== Biography ==
On December 19, 1991, in a consent decree to a civil suit brought by the federal government, Ciccone agreed to resign his posts with Local 1841 of the International Longshoremen's Association (ILA). This decree also barred Ciccone from participating in any ILA or waterfront activities. From 2000 until 2001, Ciccone helped direct a Gambino bookmaking racket in Costa Rica.

On June 4, 2002, Ciccone was indicted on charges of exerting illegal control over ILA locals 1 and 1814, in violation of the 1991 consent decree. Ciccone was also accused of attempting to extort money from actor Steven Seagal. On March 17, 2003, Ciccone was convicted on extortion charges. Ciccone served his sentence at the Fort Dix Federal Correctional Institution (FCI) in Fort Dix, New Jersey. He was released on April 24, 2013.
