= Lorenzo Mannino =

American mobster

- Born: Lorenzo Mannino; July 27, 1959 (age 67); New York City, New York, U.S.
- Other name: Lore
- Occupation: Crime boss
- Allegiance: Gambino crime family
- Convictions: Drug trafficking (1994); Attempted murder (1994)
- Penalty: 15 years imprisonment

Lorenzo "Lore" Mannino (born July 27, 1959) is an American mobster, and according to the Federal Bureau of Investigation, a powerful caporegime in the Gambino crime family. Currently he holds the position of acting boss for Domenico Cefalù in the family.

In 1994, Mannino pleaded guilty to drug trafficking and conspiring to murder Francesco Oliveri in 1988, and was sentenced 15 years in prison. He was released in 2004. It is believed Mannino served as the driver during the Oliveri murder. The 1994 plea followed a 1993 trial where John Gambino, Joseph Gambino, and Matteo Romano were co-defendants, which ended is a mistrial in June 1993 when the jury was unable to reach a verdict. Salvatore Gravano testified to the participation of John and Joseph Gambino and Lorenzo Mannino in the murder of Oliveri, as well as in a racketeering enterprise.

According to a 2007 New York Post article on the establishment of a "cooperative venture" with FBI agents stationed in Rome and Italian National Police working at the FBI Headquarters in Washington, Mannino once tried to get Frank Sinatra to help crooner Al Martino find work in Las Vegas, and was a "rising crime-family star".

In March 2019, Gambino soldier Paul Semplice, 55, was given a 28-month prison term for running a loan-sharking operation, after pleading guilty in October 2018 to loaning money to a stressed-out business owner and a gambling addict who wound up dying from a stroke. Semplice described beating one victim in a wire-tapped call, and told a cooperating witness during a wiretapped call that Mannino was his supervisor.

American Mafia
Preceded by Frank Cali	Gambino crime family Acting Boss; 2019-	Unknown
