= Salvatore LoCascio =

American mobster

Salvatore LoCascio (born July 21, 1958) is a reputed former caporegime in the New York Gambino crime family. His father, Frank LoCascio, was the acting underboss (1988-1990), and acting consigliere (1990-1992) for John Gotti.

== Early life ==
LoCascio grew up in Eastchester, New York. In 1985, with $115,000 that he received from wedding gifts he started his own business, Creative Program Communications, Incorporated with a few friends.

== The Scores case ==
In 1998, LoCascio and Michael "Mikey Scars" DiLeonardo were arrested for attempting to extort money from Scores, a famous upscale strip club in Manhattan. However, the case against LoCascio was weak, so prosecutors offered to drop the charges. In return, LoCascio pleaded guilty to tax evasion for deriving income from illegal gambling. He was sentenced to ten months, part of which was home arrest, and a $1.5 million fine. At the time of his plea, Locascio ran numerous 900 number phone services, from psychic hot lines to sports scores.

== Pornography and credit card fraud ==
While serving his time in home, LoCascio was already building what would be called the largest consumer fraud in American history. Along with Gambino mob soldier Richard "Richie" Martino, LoCascio created a number of pornographic websites. These websites were formed through a partnership between Martino and Norman Chanes, a direct marketer. The scam required an age verification check before an adult could access a "free preview" of the sexual content. To perform an age verification check, the customer had to enter their credit card information. The websites clearly stated that the viewer was getting a free preview and their credit card would not be charged. In reality, Locascio and crew were fraudulently charging $25 to $75 on these accounts.

Local phone carrier services had been allowing third party telecommunication companies to bill existing customers for services rendered. Typically this would include items such as voice mail and overseas long distance charges. The LoCascio crew then set about billing customers located primarily in the United States mid west for charges they had not requested. This billing was facilitated through the now defunct USP&C of Overland Park, Kansas. The scheme is known as 'cramming'.

Soon complaints from victims of both the internet sites and phone bills caught the attention of the US Justice Department. By February 2004, the entire LoCascio crew had been arrested. Federal prosecutors estimate that the Gambinos grossed approximately $500 million from the phone cramming operation. LoCascio was sentenced to two years in federal prison; he was released on August 1, 2008.
