= Robert Mormando =

American mafia hitman

Robert Mormando (born 1964/1965) is an American mafia hitman for the New York Gambino crime family, who later became a government informant.

Mormando was born in Ozone Park, Queens, and is a divorced father of two children. In October 2009, Mormando became the first mobster to admit in open court that he is gay while on trial for the 2003 shooting of bagel store owner, Angelo Mugnolo. Although the mafia ran gay bars and gay night clubs, including the Stonewall Inn, they frowned upon being gay. He had a close personal friendship with Richard G. Gotti, John Gotti's nephew.
