= List of Italian-American mobsters =

This list includes Italian American mobsters and organized crime figures that operate in the United States, both past and present.

== A ==
- Joseph Abate, "Joe" (1902–1994)
- Frank Abbandando, "The Dasher" (1910–1942)
- Frank Abbatemarco, "Frankie Shots" (1899–1959)
- Philip Abramo, "The King of Wall Street" (Born 1945)
- Settimo Accardi, "Big Sam" (1902–1977)
- Tony Accardo, "Joe Batters", "Big Tuna" (born Antonino Leonardo Accardo, 1906–1992)
- Anthony Accetturo, "Tumac" (born 1938)
- Momo Adamo (1895–1956)
- Carmine Agnello (born 1960)
- Thomas Agro, "T.A.", "Tipp", "Thomas Ambrosiano" (1931–1987)
- Joe Aiello (1890–1930)
- Joey Aiuppa, "Joey Doves", "Joey O'Brien" (1907–1997)
- Felix Alderisio, "Milwaukee Phil" (1912–1971)
- Harry Aleman, "The Hook" (1939–2010)
- Vincent Alo, "Jimmy Blue Eyes" (1904–2001)
- Benedetto Aloi, "Benny" (1935–2011)
- Vincenzo Aloi, "Vinny" (1933–2025)
- William Aloisio, "Smokes" (1906–1979)
- Willie Altieri, "Two-Knife" (1891–1970)
- Giacomo Amari, "Jake" (died 1997)
- Frank Amato (died 1980/1985)
- Samuzzo Amatuna, "Samuel", "Samoots" (1898–1925)
- Victor Amuso, "Little Vic", "The Terminator" (born 1934)
- Albert Anastasia, "Mad Hatter", "Lord High Executioner" (born Umberto Anastasio, 1902–1957)
- Anthony Anastasio, "Tough Tony" (born Antonio Anastasio, 1906–1963)
- Thomas Andretta (1938–2019)
- Joseph Andriacchi, "Joe the Builder" (1932–2024)
- Donald Angelini, "The Wizard of Odds" (1926–2000)
- Donato Angiulo, "Danny", "Laughing Fox" (1923–2009)
- Francesco Angiulo, "Frank" "Frankie the Cat" (1921–2015)
- James Angiulo, "Jimmy Jones" (1939–2014)
- Gennaro Angiulo, "Jerry" (1919–2009)
- Anthony Antico, "Tico" (1945–2020)
- Ignacio Antinori (born Ignazio Pizzuto Antinoro, 1885–1940)
- John Ardito, "Buster" (1919–2006)
- Joe Adonis, "Joey A.", "Joe Adone" (born Giuseppe Antonio Doto, 1902–1971)
- Joseph Ardizzone, "Iron Man" (born Giuseppe Ernesto Ardizzone, 1884–1931)
- Joseph Armone, "Joe Piney" (1917–1992)
- Stephen Armone, "14th Street Steve" (1899–1960)
- Vincent Asaro, "Vinnie" (1935–2023)
- Louis Attanasio, "Louie Ha Ha" (born 1944)
- Alphonse Attardi, "The Peacemaker" (1892–1970)
- Salvatore Avellino, "Sal", "The Golfer" (born 1935)

== B ==
- Frank Balistrieri, "Frankie Bal", "Mr. Big" (1918–1993)
- Anthony Baratta, "Bowat" (born 1938)
- Joseph Barbara, "Joe the Barber" (born Giuseppe Maria Barbara, 1905–1959)
- John Barbato, "Johnny Sausage" (1934–2025)
- Vincent Basciano, "Vinny Gorgeous" (born 1959)
- Sam Battaglia, "Teets" (1908–1973)
- James Belcastro, "Mad Bomber" (1895–1945)
- Liborio Bellomo, "Barney" (born 1957)
- Nicholas Bianco, "Nicky" (1932–1994)
- Anthony J. Biase (1909–1991)
- Thomas Bilotti, "The Wig", "The Toupee", "The Doberman", "Zombie Bilotti", "The Pitbull", "Tommy" (1940–1985)
- Charles Binaggio, "Charlie" (1909–1950)
- Joseph Biondo, "Joe Bandy", "Joe the Blonde", "Little Rabbit" (born Giuseppe Biondo, 1897–1966)
- Attilio Bitondo, "Tillio" (1928–2024)
- Ferdinand Boccia, "The Shadow" (1900–1934)
- Richard Boiardo, "Richie the Boot" (1890–1984)
- Frank Bompensiero, "Frankie Bomp" (1905–1977)
- Joseph Bonanno, "Joe Bananas", "Don Peppino" (born Giuseppe Carlo Bonanno, 1905–2002)
- Salvatore Bonanno, "Bill" (1932–2008)
- Cesare Bonventre, "The Tall Guy" (1951–1984)
- Giovanni Bonventre, "John" (1901–1970)
- Vito Bonventre (1875–1930)
- Rosario Borgio (1861–1919)
- Bartholomew Boriello, "Bobby" (1944–1991)
- Anthony Brancato (1914–1951)
- Dominic Brooklier, "Jimmy Regace" (born Domenico Brucceleri, 1914–1984)
- Salvatore Briguglio, "Sally Bugs" (1930–1978)
- Adolfo Bruno, "Al" (1945–2003)
- Angelo Bruno, "The Gentle Don" (born Angelo Annaloro, 1910–1980)
- Fiore Buccieri, "Fifi" (1907–1973)
- Frank Buccieri, "The Horse", "Frank Russo", "Big Frank" (1919–2004)
- Russell Bufalino, "McGee", "The Old Man" (born Rosario Alberto Bufalino, 1903–1994)

== C ==
- Joel Cacace, "Joe Waverly" (born 1941)
- Thomas Cacciopoli, "Tommy Sneakers", "Cacci" (born 1949)
- Jimmy Caci (1925–2011)
- Vincent Cafaro, "Fish" (1933-2004)
- Marshall Joseph Caifano (born Marcello Giuseppe Caifano, 1911–2003)
- Frank Calabrese Sr., "Frankie Breeze", "The Breeze" (1937–2012)
- Nicholas Calabrese (1942–2023)
- Frank Cali, "Franky Boy" (1965–2019)
- William Cammisano, "Willie the Rat" (1914–1995)
- Louis Campagna, "Little New York" (1900–1955)
- Joseph Cantalupo, "Joey" (born 1943)
- Richard Cantarella, "Shellackhead" (born 1944)
- Dominick Canterino, "Baldy Dom" (1929–1990)
- Anthony Capo, "Tony" (1959–2012)
- Al Capone, "Scarface", "Big Al", "Al Brown" (1899–1947)
- Frank Capone (1895–1924)
- Louis Capone (1896–1944)
- Ralph Capone, "Bottles" (born Raffaele James Capone, 1894–1974)
- Antonio Caponigro, "Tony Bananas" (1912–1980)
- Frankie Carbo, "Frank Tucker", "Mr. Fury", "Mr. Gray" (born Paolo Giovanni Carbo, 1904–1976)
- Anthony J. Cardarella, "Tiger" (1926–1984)
- Sam Cardinelli (born Salvatore Cardinella, 1869–1921)
- Anthony Carfano, "Little Augie Pisano" (1895–1959)
- Joseph Caridi, "Joe C" (1948–2024)
- Sam Carlisi, "Black Sam", "Wings" (1914–1997)
- Charles Carneglia (born 1946)
- John Carneglia, "Johnny Carnegs" (born 1945)
- Sylvestro Carolla, "Silver Dollar Sam" (1896–1972)
- Charles Carrollo, "Charlie the Wop" (born Vincenzo Carrollo, 1902–1979)
- Robert F. Carrozza, "Bobby Russo" (born 1940)
- Frank T. Caruso, "Skids" (1911–1983)
- Primo Cassarino (born 1956)
- Anthony Casso, "Gaspipe" (1942–2020)
- Paul Castellano, "Big Paul" (1915–1985)
- Richard Castucci, "Ritchie" (1928–1976)
- Salvatore Catalanotte, "Sam Sings in the Night" (born Salvatore Catalanotto, 1883–1930)
- Dominick Cataldo, "Little Dom" (1923–1997)
- Gerardo Catena, "Jerry" (1902–2000)
- Domenico Cefalù, "Italian Dom" (born 1947)
- Dino Cellini (1924–1978)
- Anthony Centracchio (1929–2001)
- Jackie Cerone, "Jackie the Lackey" (1914–1996)
- Peter Chiodo, "Fat Pete" (1951–2016)
- Anthony Ciccone, "Sonny" (born 1934)
- Nicholas Ciotti, "Buddy" (1944–2003)
- Dominick Cirillo, "Quiet Dom" (1929–2024)
- Frank Cirofici, "Frank Murato", "Dago Frank" (1887–1914)
- Anthony Civella, "Tony Ripe" (1929–2006)
- Carl Civella, "Corky" (1910–1994)
- Nicholas Civella, "Nick" (born Giuseppe Nicoli Civella, 1912–1983)
- Joseph Civello (1902–1970)
- Michael Clemente, "Mike Costello", "Big Mike" (1908–1987)
- Frank Colacurcio (1917–2010)
- Ettore Coco, "Eddie" (1908–1991)
- Eco James Coli (1922–1982)
- Joseph Colombo, "Joe" (1923–1978)
- Big Jim Colosimo, "Diamond Jim" (born Vincenzo Colosimo, 1878–1920)
- Louis Consalvo, "Louie Eggs" (born 1958)
- Pasquale Conte, "Patty", "Patsy" (1925–2017)
- Frank Coppa, "Big Frank" (1941–2024)
- Frank Coppola, "Frank Three Fingers" (born Francesco Paolo Coppola, 1899–1982)
- Michael Coppola, "Trigger Mike" (1900–1966)
- Mikey Coppola, "Mikey Cigars" (born 1946)
- Anthony Corallo, "Tony Ducks" (1913–2000)
- Anthony Cornero, "Admiral", "Tony the Hat" (born Antonio Cornero Stralla, 1899–1955)
- Joseph Corozzo, "Jo Jo" (1942–2024)
- Nicholas Corozzo, "Little Nicky" (born 1940)
- Samuel Corsaro, "Little Sammy" (1943–2002)
- Dominic Cortina (1925–1999)
- James Cosmano, "Sunny Jim" (born Vincenzo Cosmano, 1885–1943)
- Frank Costello, "The Prime Minister" (born Francesco Castiglia, 1891–1973)
- Steven Crea, "Stevie Wonder", "Herbie" (born 1947)
- Perry Criscitelli (born 1950)
- Frank Cullotta (1938–2020)
- Domenico Cutaia, "Danny" (1936–2018)
- William Cutolo, "Billy Fingers", "Wild Bill" (born Guglielmo Cutolo, 1949–1999)

== D ==
- William Daddano Sr., "William Russo", "Willie Potatoes" (1912–1975)
- Louis Daidone, "Louie Bagels" (born 1946)
- John D'Amato, "Johnny Boy" (1940–1992)
- Gaspare D'Amico, "Gaspar" (1886–1975)
- Marco D'Amico, "The Mover" (1936–2020)
- Jackie D'Amico, "Jackie Nose" (1937–2023)
- Joseph D'Amico (born 1955)
- Anthony D'Andrea (born Antonio D'Andrea, 1872–1921)
- Ralph Daniello, "The Barber" (born Alfonso Pepe, 1886–1925)
- Salvatore D'Aquila, "Toto", "Tata" (1878–1928)
- Alphonse D'Arco, "Little Al" (1932–2019)
- Michael DeBatt, "Mickey" (1949–1987)
- Angelo DeCarlo, "Gyp" (1902–1973)
- Sam DeCavalcante, "Sam the Plumber" (1913–1997)
- Frank DeCicco, "Frankie D.", "Frankie Cheech" (1935–1986)
- George DeCicco (1929–2014)
- Joseph DeFede, "Little Joe", "Joe D" (1934–2012)
- Peter DeFeo, "Philie Aquilino", "Petey" (1902–1993)
- William D'Elia, "Big Billy" (born 1946)
- Patrick DeFilippo, "Patty from the Bronx" (1939–2013)
- Andrew Thomas DelGiorno, "Tommy Del" (born 1940)
- Aniello Dellacroce, "Mr. Neil", "The Lamb" (1914–1985)
- Frank Deluca (born Francesco DeLuca, 1898–1967)
- Joseph Deluca (born Giuseppe DeLuca, 1893–1952)
- Carl DeLuna, "Tuffy" (1927–2008)
- Frank DeMayo, "Chee-Chee" (born Franco DeMaio, 1885–1949)
- Roy DeMeo (1940–1983)
- Lawrence Dentico, "Larry Fab", "Little Larry" (born 1923)
- Gregory DePalma (1932–2009)
- John DeRoss, "Jackie", "Jackie Zambooka" (born 1937)
- Frank DeSimone (1909–1967)
- Rosario DeSimone, "The Chief" (1873–1946)
- Thomas DeSimone, "Two-Gun Tommy" (1950–1979)
- Mario Anthony DeStefano (born Mario Antonio DeStefano, 1915–1975)
- Sam DeStefano, "Mad Sam" (1909–1973)
- Robert DiBernardo, "DiB" (1937–1986)
- Paul DiCocco Sr., "Legs DiCocco" (1924–1989)
- John DiFronzo (1928–2018)
- Peter DiFronzo (1933–2020)
- Sebastiano DiGaetano (1862–1912)
- Vito Di Giorgio (1880–1922)
- John DiGilio, "Johnny Dee" (1932–1988)
- Michael DiLeonardo, "Mickey Scars" (born 1955)
- Leonard DiMaria, "Lenny" (born 1941)
- Joseph DiNapoli, "Joey D.", "Joey Dee" (1935–2024)
- Louis DiNapoli, "Louie D." (born 1938)
- Vincent DiNapoli, "Vinny D." (1937–2005)
- Frederick DiNome (1935–1986)
- Richard DiNome, "Richie" (1954–1984)
- Jackie DiNorscio (1940–2004)
- Rocco DiSiglio, "Rocky" (1939–1966)
- Rosario Dispenza (died 1914)
- Johnny Dio (1914–1979)
- Joseph Dippolito, "Joe Dip" (1914–1974)
- Joseph DiVarco, "Little Caesar" (1911–1986)
- Jack Dragna, "Capone of Los Angeles" (born Ignazio Dragna, 1891–1956)
- Tom Dragna (born Gaetano Dragna, 1889–1977)
- Louis Tom Dragna, "The Reluctant Prince" (1920–2012)
- Vincent Drucci, "Schemer" (born Victor D'Ambrosio, 1898–1927)

== E ==
- Thomas Eboli, "Tommy Ryan" (born Tommaso Eboli, 1911–1972)
- Alfred Embarrato, "Al Walker" (1909–2001)
- Joe Esposito, "Diamond Joe" (born Giuseppe Esposito, 1872–1928)
- Natale Evola, "Joe Diamond" (1907–1973)

== F ==
- Albert Facchiano, "Chinky", "The Old Man" (1910 – 2011)
- James Failla, "Jimmy Brown" (1919–1999)
- Costabile Farace, "Gus" (1960–1989)
- Carmine Fatico, "Charley Wagons" (1910–1991)
- Anthony Federici, "Tough Tony" (1940–2022)
- Steve Ferrigno (1900–1930)
- Louis Ferrante (born 1969)
- Theresa Ferrara (1952–1979)
- Vincent M. Ferrara, "The Animal" (born 1949)
- Joseph Ferriola, "Oscar", "Joe Nagall" (1927–1989)
- Ray Ferritto (1929–2004)
- Vito Cascio Ferro (1862–1943)
- Anthony Fiato, "The Animal", "Tony Rome" (born 1949)
- Charles Fischetti, "Trigger Happy", "The Fixer" (1891–1951)
- Rocco Fischetti, "Rocky", "Ralph Fisher" (1903–1964)
- Tino Fiumara, "T", "The Greek", "George Greco" (1941–2010)
- Stephen Flemmi, "The Rifleman" (born 1934)
- Vincent Flemmi, "Jimmy The Bear", "Vinnie the Butcher" (1935–1979)
- John Franzese, "Sonny" (1917–2020)
- John Franzese Jr. (born 1960)
- Michael Franzese, "The Yuppie Don" (born 1951)
- Christopher Furnari, "Sergio Vieira", "Fuzi" (1924–2018)
- Jimmy Fratianno, "The Weasel" (born Aladena Fratianno, 1913–1993)
- Louis Fratto, "Lew Farrell", "Cock-Eyed Lou" (born Luigi Tommaso Giuseppe Fratto, 1907–1967)
- Rudy Fratto (born 1943)

== G ==
- Anthony Gaggi, "Nino" (1925–1988)
- Tommy Gagliano (1883–1951)
- Carmine Galante, "The Cigar", "Lilo" (1910–1979)
- James Galante (born 1953)
- Joseph Galizia, "Joe Glitz" (1941–1998)
- Albert Gallo, "Kid Blast", "Al" (born 1930)
- Joe Gallo, "Crazy Joe", "Joey the Blond" (1929–1972)
- Joseph N. Gallo (1912–1995)
- Kenny Gallo, "Kenji" (born 1968)
- Giosue Gallucci, "Luccariello", "The King of Little Italy" (1864–1915)
- Carlo Gambino, "Don Carlo" (1902–1976)
- John Gambino (1942–2017)
- Thomas Gambino, "Tommy" (1929–2023)
- Rosario Gambino, "Sal" (born 1942)
- Rosario Gangi, "Ross" (born 1939)
- Eddie Garafola, "Cousin Eddie" (1938–2020)
- Charles Gargotta, "Mad Dog" (1900–1950)
- Angelo Genna, "Bloody Angelo" (1898–1925)
- Mike Genna, "Mike the Devil" (1895–1925)
- Tony Genna, "Tony the Gentleman" (1890–1925)
- Vincenzo Genna, "James", "Jim" (1888–1931)
- Michael James Genovese, "Mike" (1919–2006)
- Vito Genovese, "Don Vitone" (1897–1969)
- Nicola Gentile, "Nick", "Zu Cola" (1885–1966)
- Anthony Giacalone, "Tony Jack" (1919–2001)
- Vito Giacalone, "Billy Jack" (1923–2012)
- Philip Giaccone, "Philly Lucky" (1932–1981)
- Sam Giancana, "Momo", "Mo", "Mooney", "Sam the Cigar", "Sam Flood" (born Salvatore Giangana, 1908–1975)
- Gaetano Gianolla (1880s–)
- Mario Gigante (1923–2022)
- Vincent Gigante, "Chin", "The Oddfather", "Vinny" (1928–2005)
- Charles Gioe, "Cherry Nose" (died 1954)
- Thomas Gioeli, "Tommy Shots" (born 1952)
- Anthony Giordano, "Tony G" (1915–1980)
- Joseph Giunta, "Hop Toad" (born Giuseppe Giunta, 1887–1929)
- Anthony Gizzo, "Fat Tony" (1902–1953)
- Joseph Glimco (born Giuseppe Glielmi, 1909–1991)
- Gene Gotti (born 1946)
- John Gotti, "Johnny Boy", "The Dapper Don", "The Teflon Don" (1940–2002)
- John A. Gotti, "Junior Gotti" (born 1964)
- Peter Gotti, "Pete", "One Eye" (1939–2021)
- Richard G. Gotti, "Ritchie" (born 1967)
- Richard V. Gotti, "Ritchie Jr." (born 1942)
- Stephen Grammauta, "Stevie Coogan" (1916–2016)
- Sammy Gravano, "Sammy the Bull" (born 1945)
- Anthony Graziano, "T.G." (1940–2019)
- Francesco Guarraci, "Frank" (1955–2016)
- Matthew Guglielmetti, "Matty" (born 1948)

== H ==
- Henry Hill (1943–2012)

== I ==
- Matthew Ianniello, "Matty the Horse" (1920–2012)
- Joseph Iannuzzi, "Joe Dogs" (1931–2015)
- James Ida, "Little Guy" (born 1940)
- Frank Illiano, "Punchy" (1928–2014)
- Nicola Impastato, "Nick Tousa" (1906–1979)
- Alphonse Indelicato, "Sonny Red" (1931–1981)
- Anthony Indelicato, "Bruno", "Whack-Whack" (born 1947)

== J ==
- Ronald Jerothe, "John", "Foxy" (born Ronald Gerote, 1947–1974)
- Wilfred Johnson, "Willie Boy" (1935–1988)
- Joseph Juliano, "Sonny" (born 1938)

== K ==
- Paul Kelly (born Paolo Antonio Vaccarelli, 1876–1936)

== L ==
- Gennaro Langella, "Jerry Lang" (1938–2013)
- Joseph Lanza, "Socks" (born Giuseppe Lanza, 1901–1968)
- Ignatius Lanzetta, "Frank Pius" (1903–?)
- Leo Lanzetta (1895–1925)
- Angelo J. LaPietra, "The Hook" (1920–1999)
- James LaPietra, "Jimmy the Lapper" (1927–1993)
- Frank LaPorte, "Frankie" (1901–1972)
- Louis LaRasso, "Fat Lou" (1926–1991)
- John LaRocca, "John La Rock" (1901–1984)
- Frank Lastorino, "Big Frank" (1939–2022)
- Peter LaTempa (1904–1945)
- Stefano LaTorre (1886–1984)
- John Lazia, "Brother John" (1896–1934)
- Daniel Leo, "Danny the Lion" (born 1941)
- Phil Leonetti, "Crazy Phil" (born 1953)
- Paolo LiCastri (1935–1979)
- Nick Licata, "Old Man", "Mr. Nick" (born Nicolò Licata, 1897–1974)
- James T. Licavoli, "Jack White", "Blackie" (born Vincentio Licavoli, 1904–1985)
- Thomas Licavoli, "Yonnie" (1904–1973)
- Peter Licavoli, "Horseface" (1902–1984)
- Joseph Ligambi, "Uncle Joe" (born 1939)
- Frank Lino, "Curly" (1938–2023)
- Frank LoCascio, "Frankie Loc" (1933–2021)
- Peter LoCascio, "Mr. Bread" (1916–1997)
- Salvatore LoCascio, "Tori" (born 1959)
- Gaetano Lococo, "Thomas", "Tano" (1895–1993)
- Pasqualino Lolordo, "Patsy" (1887–1929)
- Antonio Lombardo, "The Scourge", "Tony" (1892–1928)
- Joseph Lombardo, "Joey the Clown", "Joe Padula", "Lumbo", "Lumpy" (born Giuseppe Lombardi, 1929–2019)
- Philip Lombardo, "Benny Squint", "Cockeyed Ben", "Ben" (1908–1987)
- Carmine Lombardozzi, "The Doctor" (1913–1992)
- Angelo Lonardo, "Big Ange" (1911–2006)
- Joseph Lonardo, "Big Joe" (born Giuseppe Lonardo, 1884–1926)
- Alan Longo, "Baldie" (born 1950)
- Joseph LoPiccolo, "Baldie" (1918–1999)
- Anthony Loria Sr., "Tony Aboudamita" (1921–1989)
- Joseph Lucchese, "Joe Brown" (born Giuseppe Lucchese, 1910–1987)
- Tommy Lucchese, "Three Finger Brown", "Tommy Brown" (born Gaetano Lucchese, 1899–1967)
- Lucky Luciano, "Charlie" (born Salvatore Lucania, 1897–1962)
- Ignazio Lupo, "Lupo the Wolf", "Ignazio Saietta" (1877–1947)

== M ==
- Sam Maceo, "Velvet Glove" (1894–1951)
- Rosario Maceo, "Iron Glove", "Papa Rose" (1887–1954)
- Matthew Madonna, "Matty" (born 1935)
- Peter Magaddino (1917–1976)
- Stefano Magaddino, "Don Stefano", "The Undertaker", "The Grand Old Man of La Cosa Nostra" (1891–1974)
- Joseph Magliocco, "Joe Malayak", "Fat Joe" (born Giuseppe Magliocco, 1898–1963)
- Harry Maione, "Happy" (1908–1942)
- Alphonse Malangone, "Allie Shades" (born 1936)
- Michael Mancuso, "Mickey Nose", "The Nose" (born 1955)
- Lawrence Mangano, "Dago" (1892–1944)
- Philip Mangano (born Filippo Mangano, 1898–1951)
- Venero Mangano, "Benny Eggs" (1921–2017)
- Vincent Mangano, "Don Vincenzo" (born Vincenzo Giovanni Mangano, 1888–1951)
- Louis Manna, "Bobby" (born 1929)
- Lorenzo Mannino, "Lore" (born 1959)
- Luigi Manocchio, "Baby Shacks" (1927–2024)
- Francesco Manzo, "Frankie the Wop", "Frank Manze" (1925–2012)
- Salvatore Maranzano, "Little Caesar" (1886–1931)
- Carlos Marcello, "The Little Man", "The Godfather" (born Calogero Minacore, 1910–1993)
- James Marcello, "Little Jimmy", "Jimmy The Man" (born 1943)
- Daniel Marino (born 1940)
- Richard Martino, "Ritchie" (born 1961)
- James Martorano, "Jimmy" (born 1941)
- Johnny Martorano, "Vincent Joseph Rancourt", "Richard O'Coin", "Nick", "The Cook", "The Executioner" (born 1940)
- Joseph Masella, "Joey O" (1948–1998)
- Joe Masseria, "Joe the Boss" (1886–1931)
- Joseph Massino, "Big Joey", "The Ear" (1943–2023)
- Jack McGurn, "Machine Gun" (born Vincenzo Antonio Gibaldi, 1902–1936)
- Anthony Megale, "The Genius", "Tony" (1953–2015)
- Angelo Meli (1897–1969)
- Vincent Meli, "Little Vince" (born Vincenzo Angelo Meli, 1921–2008)
- Angelo Mercurio, "Sonny" (1936–2006)
- Chuckie Merlino (1939–2012)
- Joey Merlino, "Skinny Joe" (born 1962)
- Mike Merlo (1880–1924)
- Sam Mesi (1900–1971)
- Gaspare Messina (1879–1957)
- Aniello Migliore, "Neil" (1933–2019)
- Anthony Milano, "Old Man Tony" (born Antonio Milano, 1888–1978)
- Frank Milano (born Ciccio Milano, 1891–1970)
- Carmen Milano, "Flipper" (1929–2006)
- Peter Milano (1925–2012)
- Gaspar Milazzo, "The Peacemaker" (1887–1930)
- Manfredi Mineo, "Alfred", "Al" (1880–1930)
- Michele Miranda, "Big Mike" (1896–1973)
- Anthony Mirra, "Tony" (1927–1982)
- John C. Montana (born Giovanni Montana, 1893–1964)
- Lenny Montana (born Leonardo Passafaro, 1926–1992)
- Dominick Montiglio (born Dominick Angelo Santamaria, 1947–2021)
- Pellegrino Morano, "Don Pellegrino" (1877–?)
- Nicholas Morello, "Nick Terranova" (1890–1916)
- Giuseppe Morello, "The Clutching Hand", "The Old Fox", "Peter Morello", "Piddu Morello" (1867–1930)
- Willie Moretti, "Willie Moore" (1894–1951)
- Julie Morrell, "Jules Morello" (died 1911)

== N ==
- James Napoli, "Jimmy Nap" (1911–1992)
- Dominick Napolitano, "Sonny Black" (1936–1981)
- John Nardi (born Giovanni Narcchione, 1916–1977)
- Charles Nicoletti, "Chuckie", "The Typewriter" (1916–1977)
- Ralph Natale (1935–2022)
- Frank Nitti, "The Enforcer" (born Francesco Raffaele Nitto, 1886–1943)

== O ==
- Victor Orena, "Little Vic" (born 1934)

== P ==
- Pasquale Parrello, "Patsy" (born 1944)
- Daniel Pagano, "Danny" (born 1953)
- Joseph Luco Pagano (1928–1989)
- Frank Palermo, "Blinky" (1905–1996)
- Girolamo Palermo, "Jimmy Dumps" (1938–2014)
- Vincent Palermo, "Vinny Ocean" (born 1944)
- Charles Panarella, "Charlie Moose" (1925–2017)
- Raymond L. S. Patriarca, "The Man", "Ray" (1908–1984)
- Raymond Patriarca Jr., "Ray Jr.", "Junior Patriarca" (born 1945)
- Johnny Papalia, "Johnny Pops Papalia", "The Enforcer" (1924–1997)
- Anthony Peraino, "Big Tony" (1915–1991)
- Robert Perrino, "Bobby" (1934–1992)
- Alphonse Persico, "Little Allie Boy", "Allie Boy" (born 1951)
- Carmine Persico, "The Snake", "Junior" (1933–2019)
- Tomasso Petto, "The Ox" (1879–1905)
- Frank Piccolo, "Pic", "Frank Lanza" (1921–1981)
- Joseph Pinzolo, "Fat Joe" (1887–1930)
- Louis Pioggi, "Louis Poggi", "Louie the Lump" (1889–1969)
- Thomas Pitera, "Tommy Karate" (born 1954)
- Dominick Pizzonia, "Skinny Dom" (born 1941)
- Alfred Polizzi, "Big Al" (born Alfonso Polizzi, 1900–1975)
- Frank Polizzi (1936–2001)
- Ross Prio (born Rosario Priolo, 1901–1972)
- Angelo Prisco, "The Horn" (1917–2017)
- Joe Profaci, "The Old Man", "Don Peppino" (1897–1962)
- Anthony Provenzano, "Tony Pro" (1917–1988)
- Nunzio Provenzano, "Nunzi Pro" (1923–1997)

== R ==
- Rocco Racco (1868–1909)
- Joseph Rao, "Joseph Cangro", "Tough Joey" (1901–1962)
- Vincenzo Rao, "Vincent" (1898–1988)
- Philip Rastelli, "Rusty" (1918–1991)
- Marco Reginelli, "Little Man", "Small Man" (1897–1956)
- Gaetano Reina, "Tommy", "Tom" (1889–1930)
- George Remini, "Fat Georgie", "Big George" (1929–2007)
- Paul Ricca, "The Waiter" (born Felice DeLucia, 1897–1972)
- Lawrence Ricci, "Larry" (1945–2005)
- Louis Ricco, "Louie Bracciole" (1930–2019)
- Harry Riccobene, "Harry the Hump", "The Hunchback" (1909–2000)
- Mario Riccobene, "Sonny" (1933–1993)
- Giovanni Riggi, "John the Eagle" (1925–2015)
- Frank Rio, "Frank Cline" (1895–1935)
- Michael Rizzitello, "Mike Rizzi" (1927–2005)
- Carmine Romano, "Fish" (1935–2011)
- John Roselli, "Handsome Johnny", "John Rosselli", "John F. Stewart" (born Filippo Sacco, 1905–1976)
- Benjamin Ruggiero, "Lefty", "Lefty Guns", "Lefty Two Guns" (1923–1995)
- Angelo Ruggiero, "Quack Quack" (1940–1989)
- Anthony Russo, "Chucky", "Little Pussy" (1916–1979)

== S ==
- Michael Sabella, "Mimi" (1911–1989)
- Salvatore Sabella (1891–1962)
- Frank Salemme, "Cadillac Frank", "Julian Daniel Selig" (1933–2022)
- Anthony Salerno, "Fat Tony" (1911–1992)
- Rudolph Santobello, "Rudy" (1928–2013)
- Nicholas Santora, "Nicky Mouth" (1942–2018)
- Saverio Santora, "Sammy" (1935–1987)
- Anthony Santorelli, "Blue Eyes" (born 1946)
- Salvatore Santoro, "Tom Mix" (1915–2000)
- Michael Sarno, "Fat Boy", "The Fat Guy", "Big Mike", "The Big Guy" (born 1958)
- Salvatore Scala, "Fat Sally" (1944–2008)
- Frank Scalice, "Don Ciccio", "Don Cheech" (born Francesco Scalice, 1893–1957)
- John Scalise (born Giovanni Scalise, 1900–1929)
- Joseph Scalise, "Jerry" (born 1937)
- John T. Scalish (1912–1976)
- Frank Scarabino, "Franky the Beast" (born 1956)
- Nicodemo Scarfo, "Little Nicky" (1929–2017)
- Nicky Scarfo Jr., "Nicky Junior" (born 1965)
- Gregory Scarpa, "The Grim Reaper" (1928–1994)
- Gregory Scarpa Jr. (born 1951)
- Gerald Scarpelli (1938–1989)
- Giuseppe Schifilliti, "Pino" (born 1938)
- Nicolo Schiro, "Cola" (born Nicolò Schirò, 1872–1957)
- Paul Sciacca (1909–1986)
- Edward Sciandra, "Eddie The Conductor" (1912–2003)
- Carmine Sciandra (born 1952)
- John Sciandra, "Johnny" (1899–1940)
- Gerlando Sciascia, "George from Canada" (1934–1999)
- Nicholas Scibetta, "Little Nicky" (died 1978)
- Onofrio Sciortino (1891–1959)
- Augustus Sclafani, "Big Gus" (died 1986)
- Ralph Scopo, "Little Ralphie" (1932–1993)
- Anthony Scotto, "Tony" (1934–2021)
- Anthony Senter (born 1955)
- Alphonso Sgroia, "The Butcher" (1886–1940)
- Joseph Sica, "JS" (1911–1982)
- Peter Simone, "Las Vegas Pete" (1945–2025)
- Michele Sindona, "The Shark" (1920–1986)
- Frank Sindone (1928–1980)
- Thomas Sinito, "The Chinaman" (1938–1997)
- Alphonse Sisca, "Funzie" (born 1942/1946)
- Vincent Solano (1923–1992)
- Anthony Spero, "Tony", "The Old Man" (1929–2008)
- Anthony Spilotro, "Tony the Ant" (1938–1986)
- Michael Spilotro, "Micky" (1944–1986)
- Victor Spilotro (1935–1997)
- Pat Spirito, "Pat the Cat" (1939–1983)
- James Squillante, "Jimmy Jerome", "Vincent Squillante" (1919–1960)
- Arnold Squitieri, "Zeke", "Bozey", "Sylvester", "Squiggy" (1936–2022)
- John Stanfa, "The Dour Don", "The Zip" (born 1940)
- Johnny Stompanato, "Handsome Harry", "John Steele", "Oscar" (1925–1958)
- Anthony Strollo, "Tony Bender" (1899–1962)

== T ==
- Martin Taccetta, "Marty" (born 1951)
- Michael Taccetta, "Mike T.", "Mad Dog" (born 1947)
- Silva Tagliagamba (died 1922)
- Enrico Tameleo, "Henry", "The Referee" (1901–1985)
- John Tartamella (born Giovanni Tartamella, 1892–1966)
- Vincent Teresa, "Fat Vinny" (1930–1990)
- Ciro Terranova, "The Artichoke King" (1888–1938)
- Vincenzo Terranova, "Vincent", "The Tiger of Harlem" (1886–1922)
- Joseph Testa (born 1955)
- Philip Testa, "Chicken Man" (1924–1981)
- Salvatore Testa, "Salvie", "The Crown Prince of the Philadelphia Mob" (1956–1984)
- Frank Tieri, "The Old Man", "Funzi" (born Alfonso Tieri, 1904–1981)
- Albert Tocco, "Caesar Tocco" (1929–2005)
- Jack Tocco (1927–2014)
- William Tocco, "Black Bill" (born Guglielmo Vito Tocco, 1897–1972)
- Frank Todaro (1889–1944)
- Joseph Todaro Jr., "Big Joe" (born 1945)
- Joseph Todaro Sr., "Lead Pipe Joe" (1923–2012)
- Salvatore Todaro, "Sam", "Black Sam" (born Agosto Arcangelo, 1885–1929)
- Antonio Tomasulo, "Bootsie" (1917–1987)
- James Torello, "Turk" (1930–1979)
- Johnny Torrio, "The Fox", "Papa Johnny", "The Brain", "The Immune" (born Donato Torrio, 1882–1957)
- Santo Trafficante Jr., "Louie Santos", "The Old Man" (1914–1987)
- Santo Trafficante Sr. (1886–1954)
- Carmine Tramunti, "Mr. Gribbs" (1910–1978)
- Dominick Trinchera, "Big Trin", "Trinny" (1936–1981)
- John Tronolone, "Peanuts" (1910–1991)
- Ronnie Trucchio, "One Armed Ronnie" (born 1951)
- Matthew Trupiano, "Mike" (1938–1997)
- Tony Tursi (1901–1989)
- Charles Tuzzo, "Chuckie" (born 1933)

== U ==
- Charles Ubriaco (born Camillo Umbriaco, 1867–1916)

== V ==
- Joseph Valachi, "Joe", "Joe Cago", "Joe Cargo" (1903–1971)
- Rocco Valenti (1895–?)
- Umberto Valenti (1891–1922)
- Louis Vallario, "Big Lou" (born 1942)
- Ernest Varacalli, "Junior" (born 1943)
- Paul Vario, "Paulie" (1914–1988)
- Gaetano Vastola, "Corky", "The Big Guy" (born 1928)
- Anthony Veranis, "Mickey White", "Tony" (1938–1966)
- Giuseppe Viserte, "Diamond Joe" (1890–1921)
- John Vitale (1909–1982)
- Salvatore Vitale, "Good Looking Sal", "The Chief" (born 1947)
- Alessandro Vollero, "Sandro" (1889–1959)

== Y ==
- Frankie Yale, "Frankie Uale" (1893–1928)

== Z ==
- John Zancocchio, "Porky" (born 1958)
- Ilario Zannino, "Larry Baione" (1920–1996)
- Ettore Zappi, "Anthony Russo" (1904–1986)
- George Zappola, "Georgie Neck" (born 1960)
- Anthony Joseph Zerilli, "Tony Z." (1927–2015)
- Joseph Zerilli, "Joe Z.", "The Old Man (born Giuseppe Zerilli, 1897–1977)
- Frank Zito, "Samuel Zaso" "Sammy the seal" (1893–1974)
- Anthony Zizzo, "Little Tony" (1934–disappeared 2006)

== See also ==
- List of Mafia crime families
- List of mobsters by city
- List of crime bosses
