= Gaetano Lococo =

American mobster (1895–1993)

Gaetano Lococo (1895–1993), also known as "Thomas" or "Tano", was a mobster identified as one of the "Five Iron Men" of Kansas City, Missouri by Americanmafia.com. Lococo was known within the Kansas City crime family as an enforcer in his early years. Later on, he controlled an interest in several illegal gambling establishments.

== Arrival in Kansas City ==
In the 1930s, Lococo was frequently mentioned in local newspaper articles about major mob-related events. According to grand jury testimony, Lococo helped gunmen escape from the scene of the bloody June 1933 Union Station massacre in Kansas City. Lococo, Tony Gizzo, Charles Gargotta and Dominick Binaggio (brother of Charles Binaggio) allegedly provided the gunmen with a stolen car and escorted them out of the city a few days later.

== Shootout with the Sheriff ==
By pure chance, County Sheriff Bash, one of his deputies, the sheriff's wife, and a teenaged girl were a block away from the murder scene when they heard gunfire; they all were returning from a party. The sheriff directed his deputy to drive toward the sound of the gunfire. As the sheriff's car stopped at Armour and Forest, Gargotta and Lococo were still standing in the street. Scola and Fasone were in the front seat of the getaway car with the engine running. Scola saw Sheriff Bash exit his car with a 12 gauge shotgun; he gunned the engine and plowed his getaway car directly into the Sheriff's car. Still in their wrecked car, both Scola and Fasone opened fire on Bash, but he quickly cut them down with his riot gun (Scola and Fasone died at the scene).

Meanwhile, Lococo took off on foot (his headquarters was a few blocks away). The deputy, now out of the car, exchanged shots with Lococo. Throwing down his gun, Lococo disappeared down an alley. As Lococo made his escape, Gargotta charged Sheriff Bash with guns blazing. However, Gargotta soon ran out of ammunition and surrendered to Bash.

Despite the dubious efforts of the local police force (which was very corrupt at the time), Lococo was never charged with Anthon's murder or the ensuing shootout. But in 1939, during a citywide cleanup campaign, Lococo was charged with income tax evasion and sent to prison for a short term. This would be Lococo's only major conviction.

== Later years ==
By the late 1940s, Lococo was stricken with arthritis and was making health-related trips to the U.S. Southwest and Mexico. In 1948, he moved to Nogales, Arizona, and purchased a small hotel. Lococo then attempted to open a gambling operation in the hotel, but the Santa Cruz County Sheriff thwarted his project. Lococo finally sold the hotel and returned to Kansas City.

In March 1950, Lococo was identified at a conference of U.S. and Sicilian Mafia members at a hotel in Tijuana, Mexico. When local Mexican police found out about the conference, they ended it prematurely. Less than a month after the Tijuana conference, both Kansas City boss Charles Binaggio and underboss Gargotta were assassinated. A few years later, during the U.S. Senate hearings on organized crime (the Kefauver hearings) it was speculated that the decision to whack Binaggio had been made at this conference. However, there was no way to ever prove it.

In the 1960s, Lococo retired in Kansas City. In his later years, a Kansas City pizza restaurant ("Gaetano's") was reportedly named for him. In the late 1990s, Gaetano Lococo died of natural causes.
