= Joseph DiVarco =

American mobster

- Born: July 27, 1911
- Died: January 5, 1986 (aged 74); Washington, D.C.
- Years active: 1970s and 1980s
- Organization: Chicago Outfit
- Height: 5 ft 5 in (165 cm)
- Allegiance: Chicago Outfit
- Conviction: RICO violations
- Penalty: 10 years in prison

Details
- Location: Chicago, Illinois
- Imprisoned at: 1985

Joseph Vincent "Caesar" DiVarco (July 27, 1911 – January 5, 1986) was a Chicago mobster with the Chicago Outfit who was involved in numerous street rackets.

He and Joe Arnold were partners in a local haberdashery during the 1960s. As an associate of North Side caporegime Vincent Solano, DiVarco later oversaw the day-to-day operations of the Rush Street crew. During the 1970s and 1980s, these activities included illegal gambling, loan sharking, extortion, protection, "street tax" collections, and the operation of several adult bookstore operations. DiVarco, along with James Alegretti watched over all the Outfit-owned night clubs, gambling halls, and brothels in the area. He was basically under the rule of Ross Prio. DiVarco was said to have performed many hits for Outfit boss Sam Giancana. After Giancana was murdered, DiVarco's power waned.

In 1983, Solano ordered DiVarco to murder mobster Ken Eto. Eto had recently been convicted on gambling charges and Solano was worried about him testifying for the authorities. Two hitmen, Jasper Campise and John Gattuso, a Cook County, Illinois, sheriff's deputy, ambushed Eto in his car and shot him three times in the head. However, the two men had improperly packed their own ammunition and the shots did not penetrate Eto's skull. Eto survived and became a government witness. In retribution for the botched hit, DiVarco was stripped of his power and the two hitmen were murdered.

Federal authorities learned of DiVarco's role in the Chicago Outfit through undercover surveillance, government informants, and cooperation with other state and federal agencies. In 1985, DiVarco was convicted of Racketeer Influenced and Corrupt Organizations Act (RICO) violations and running a sports betting operation. He was sentenced to ten years in prison.

On January 5, 1986, DiVarco died in Washington, D.C., while in federal custody.
