= CISD =

CISD may refer to:

- Canadian Industrial Security Directorate
- Consolidated Independent School District, a term used in Texas for school districts for merged districts
- Colonel's Island Railroad
- Configuration interaction singles & doubles, a variational quantum-chemical method for calculating electronic states
- Critical incident stress debriefing
