= Carl DeLuna =

American gangster (1927–2008)

- Born: Carl Angelo DeLuna; April 30, 1927; New York City, U.S.
- Died: July 21, 2008 (aged 81); Kansas City, Missouri, U.S.
- Other name: Tuffy
- Occupation: Gangster
- Status: Released in 1998; died in 2008
- Allegiance: Kansas City crime family
- Penalty: 20 years imprisonment

Carl Angelo "Tuffy" DeLuna (April 30, 1927 – July 21, 2008) was an organized crime figure who was once the powerful underboss of the Kansas City crime family. He was also brother-in-law to Kansas City crime boss Anthony Civella.

Born in Brooklyn, New York, DeLuna rose through the ranks of the family to eventually become underboss and second-in-command to Nicholas Civella. He was said to be personally responsible for the ambush of a rival mob crew, the Spero brothers, at the Virginia Tavern in Kansas City, Missouri in 1978.

A well-respected and trusted mobster, DeLuna maintained the family's close ties with the Chicago Outfit, the Frank Balistrieri family in Milwaukee, and the Cleveland family during the mob infiltration of several Las Vegas casinos in the mid-1970s.

In the 1995 film Casino, Artie Piscano (portrayed by Vinny Vella) was based in large part on Carl DeLuna. In the film, Piscano dies of a heart attack during a Federal Bureau of Investigation (FBI) raid on his home. In reality, DeLuna's home was raided on February 14, 1979, and it was found that he kept extensive cryptic notes hidden in his basement, which together with wiretaps, connected all the dots the FBI needed in linking the mob to illegal control of Las Vegas casinos. He was tried and sentenced to 20 years for his crimes. Chicago Outfit mobsters, including its then reputed boss, Joseph Aiuppa, were convicted along with DeLuna, based on the evidence seized from him. As a result, all cooperation between other Midwestern organized crime families and the Kansas City LCN was terminated.

DeLuna was released from prison in 1998, and died in Kansas City in 2008.
