= COLI =

COLI may refer to:

- corporate-owned life insurance
- China Overseas Land and Investment Limited
- cost-of-living index
- Colonel's Island Railroad

== See also ==
- Coli (disambiguation)
