= Corsaro =

Corsaro is an Italian surname. Notable people with the surname include:

- Frank Corsaro (1924–2017), American opera and theatre director
- Gianni Corsaro (1925–2006), Italian racewalker
- Samuel Corsaro (1943–2002), American mobster
- Sandro Corsaro, American animator
