= Coli =

Coli may refer to:

== Places ==
- Coli, Emilia-Romagna, a comune in the Province of Piacenza in Italy
- Coli Toro Formation, a Mesozoic geologic formation

== People ==
- Claudia Coli, a French actress in the 2005 Gabrielle film
- Eco James Coli (1922-1982), a Chicago tough guy who was an alleged labor racketeer
- François Coli (1881–1927), a French pilot and navigator
- Giovanni Coli (1636–1691), an Italian painter from Lucca active in the Baroque style

== Biology ==
- Fascia coli a synonym for the deep cervical fascia, muscles in the neck
- Escherichia coli, a type of coliform bacteria normally present in the intestine
- Adenomatosis polyposis coli, a protein that in humans is encoded by the APC gene
- Melanosis coli, a disorder of pigmentation of the wall of the colon
- Taenia coli, three separate longitudinal ribbons of smooth muscle

== See also ==
- COLI (disambiguation)
