= Cammisano =

Cammisano is a surname. Notable people with the surname include:

- William Cammisano (1914–1995), American mobster
- Vito Cammisano, American college swimmer and former fiancé of American football player Michael Sam
