= Golden Isles Terminal Railroad =

Overview
- Parent company: Genesee and Wyoming
- Headquarters: Brunswick, Georgia
- Locale: Brunswick, Georgia

Technical
- Track gauge: 4 ft 8 1/2 in (1,435 mm) standard gauge
- Length: 7 miles (11 km)

Other
- Website: Official website

The Golden Isles Terminal Railroad (reporting mark GITM) is a terminal railroad that began operations in 1998, taking over from the Colonel's Island Railroad. As of 2024, it operates 7 miles (11 km) of track from Brunswick, GA to Anguilla, GA. It interchanges with CSX and Norfolk Southern at Anguilla. Starting in 1998, it is owned by Genesee & Wyoming Inc.
