= Guido Penosi =

Guido "The Bull" Penosi (June 4, 1930 – February 22, 2010) was a narcotics dealer with the Gambino and Lucchese crime families who was indicted for an extortion attempt against singer Wayne Newton.

== Newton and Penosi ==
Not much is known about Penosi's earlier years other than his being convicted of murder as a juvenile. In 1971, Penosi was convicted of tax evasion for not paying income taxes for several years during the 1960s. He was the cousin of Frank Piccolo.

During the 1960s, Penosi met Newton while he was performing at New York City's famous Copacabana Club. After that meeting, their friendship continued to develop. According to court records, Newton's office calendar marked Penosi's birthday prominently and Newton spent almost a month with Penosi in Florida. Penosi attended the wedding of Newton's brother, Jerry. In 1976, Newton flew to Los Angeles with his band to perform for Penosi's son free of charge.

== Problem and payment ==
In 1980, Newton approached Penosi for help. Newton had pulled out of a Las Vegas tabloid show called Backstage. As a result, he had been receiving threats from other organized crime figures. To help Newton, Penosi contacted his cousin Frank Piccolo, who allegedly solved the problem. However, Newton may not have realized that Penosi and Piccolo expected some payback for this favor. As Judge William Norris of the Court of Appeals for the Ninth Circuit wrote,

"Newton went to Penosi with a problem and Penosi called Piccolo who helped solve the problem. Piccolo and Penosi later discussed 'earning off' Newton and possibly 'earning off' his ownership of the Aladdin Hotel. Piccolo and Penosi were investigated and indicted by a federal grand jury, which heard the testimony of Wayne Newton. All of these facts are beyond dispute."

Newton originally tried to deny any relationship with Penosi. Judge Norris wrote that Newton,

"...testified falsely that Penosi had never visited him" and that it was "...undisputed that a disagreement over an amount not less than $20,000..." had motivated Newton to go to Penosi for help.

This episode became public when the NBC TV network did an exposé on Newton's alleged mob connections. Newton tried to block NBC in court from airing the program, but failed. In June 1981, Penosi and Piccolo were charged with conspiring to extort money and 'valuable rights' from Newton and entertainer Lola Falana. The first trial resulted in a hung jury and the second trial in 1982 found Penosi not guilty on all charges.

== Quotes about Penosi ==
- "Then there was the deposition my partner, Tom Kavaler, took of Guido Penosi, who arrived at the deposition open-shirted, adorned with large gold jewellery and dressed—I know of no other way to say it—like someone involved in organized crime. Tom questioned Penosi about his relationship with Newton and received detailed responses. When Tom asked Penosi, as he sometimes was obliged to, if he had engaged in one criminal act or another, Penosi would respond, "I take the Fifth" (pronounced "Fiff"), and Tom, at every break, would carefully assure Penosi that he was just doing his job. Penosi seemed amused, and so were we."Floyd Abrams.

== See also ==
- Floyd Abrams and the Wayne Newton case
- Frank Piccolo
- Organized crime
- Wayne Newton
