= Frankie LaPorte =

American racketeer in the Chicago Outfit

Frank LaPorte
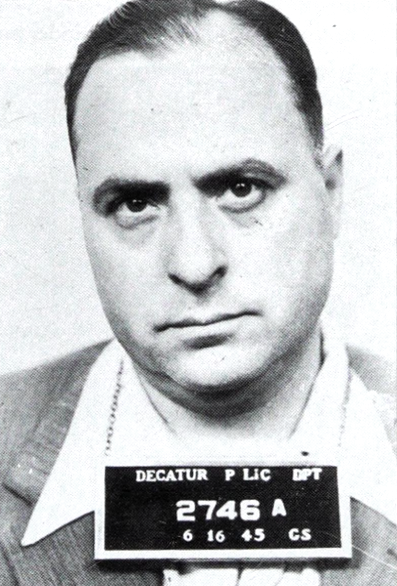
- Born: October 7, 1901; Sambiase, Calabria, Italy
- Died: October 30, 1972 (aged 71); Flossmoor, Illinois, U.S.
- Other names: Frankie; Frank Liperetto; Frank Lipperatti; Francesco Liparotta
- Known for: Organized crime Chicago Outfit boss for Chicago Heights
- Title: Caporegime of the Chicago Heights crew
- Predecessor: Vincenzo "Jim Emery" Amaratti (late 1920s - 1956)
- Allegiance: Chicago Outfit

Frank LaPorte (October 7, 1901 – October 30, 1972) was an Italian–American racketeer in the Chicago Outfit. He was the Chicago Heights caporegime during the early 20th century. His closest associates in bootlegging included Ross Prio, Louis Campagna and onetime Outfit boss, Al Capone.

== Background and relationship with Outfit boss Al Capone ==
Historians have little information on LaPorte's early life and background. Even his role in the Chicago Outfit is currently unclear.

However, what is known is that LaPorte was considered a "power broker" in the Outfit and a powerful mobster, who kept a relatively low profile. According to some, LaPorte and other Chicago Heights gangsters held seats on the Commission for bosses.

According to Laurance Begreen, Al Capone biographer and author of the book Capone: The Man and the Era, Capone was merely a "front boss" for the Outfit, while LaPorte and other Sicilian racketeers managed the Outfit behind the scenes.

== Calumet City operations ==
Frank LaPorte is believed to have been the member of the Chicago Outfit who was most responsible for developing and maintaining the "Sin Strip" area of Calumet City. Police avoided Sin Strip and risked violence if they tried to make an arrest. In 1959, the state of Illinois conducted a police raid that resulted in 98 arrests and the seizure of business records. An article published in Chicago Daily News on June 2, 1959, exposed LaPorte as being instrumental in the illegal activities in Calumet City.
