= Carl Civella =

American mobster

Carl "Cork" Civella (January 28, 1910 – October 2, 1994) was the leader of the Kansas City crime family following the death of his brother, long-time crime boss Nicholas Civella, after heading day-to-day operations during the mid-1970s.

Carl's reign as Kansas city boss was brief. In 1984, he and his son, Anthony Civella, were convicted of skimming operations in Las Vegas casinos throughout the 1970s. Carl was sentenced to 10-to-20 years in prison, with another 10 years added on an unrelated charge.

On October 2, 1994, Carl Civella died in prison of pneumonia.

Business positions
Preceded by Nicholas Civella	Kansas City crime family Boss; 1983–1984	Succeeded by Anthony Civella
