= Vincent Solano =

American mobster and union official

Vincent Solano (October 1919 – November 16, 1992) was an American mobster and caporegime for the Chicago Outfit who ran a corrupt Laborers Union local in Chicago.

A longtime organized crime figure on Chicago's North Side, Solano served as chauffeur and bodyguard to mobster Ross Prio. After Prio's death in 1972, Solano succeeded him as head of the Rush Street Crew, which covered most of Northern Chicago and the adjoining suburbs. In 1977, Solano was elected union president of the Local 1 of the Laborers' International Union of North America, which included syndicate members Joseph Aiello, Sal Gruttadauro, Frank De Monte and Frank Colaianni as business managers.

According to Ken "Tokyo Joe" Eto, a former crew member, Solano used the Local 1 union hall to run illegal gambling, extortion and prostitution rackets. In February 1983, Eto was convicted on a gambling charge. Afraid that Eto might strike a deal with the government for leniency, Solano allegedly ordered Eto's death. Two hit men approached Eto in his car on a Chicago street and shot him three times in the head. However, Eto managed to survive. Their failure to kill Eto was blamed on an insufficient amount of powder in the bullet cartridges. The two gunmen had packed their own ammunition to reduce their chances of being traced to Eto's murder. Eto later became a government witness. Five months after the unsuccessful hit, the two gunmen were found strangled and stabbed to death.

On November 16, 1992, Vincent Solano died of natural causes at his home in Lisle, Illinois.
