= Louis Campagna =

American mobster (1900–1955)

- CPD mugshot of Campagna
- Born: March 31, 1900; Brooklyn, New York, U.S
- Died: May 31, 1955 (aged 55); Miami, Florida, U.S.
- Occupations: gangster labor racketeering extortion
- Spouse: Charlotte Campagna
- Status: Deceased

Louis "Little New York" Campagna (March 31, 1900 – May 31, 1955) was an American gangster and a high-ranking member of the Chicago Outfit for over three decades.

== Early years ==
Campagna was born in Brooklyn to parents from mainland Italy. As a teenager, he joined New York's infamous Five Points Gang of Manhattan. One of Campagna's gang associates was future Chicago Outfit boss Al Capone.

In 1919, Campagna was convicted of robbing an Illinois bank and sent to the Pontiac Reformatory in Pontiac, Illinois. In April 1924, Campagna was paroled, but was returned to the reformatory six months later for a parole violation. After his final release in November 1924, Campagna returned to New York.

== Capone era ==
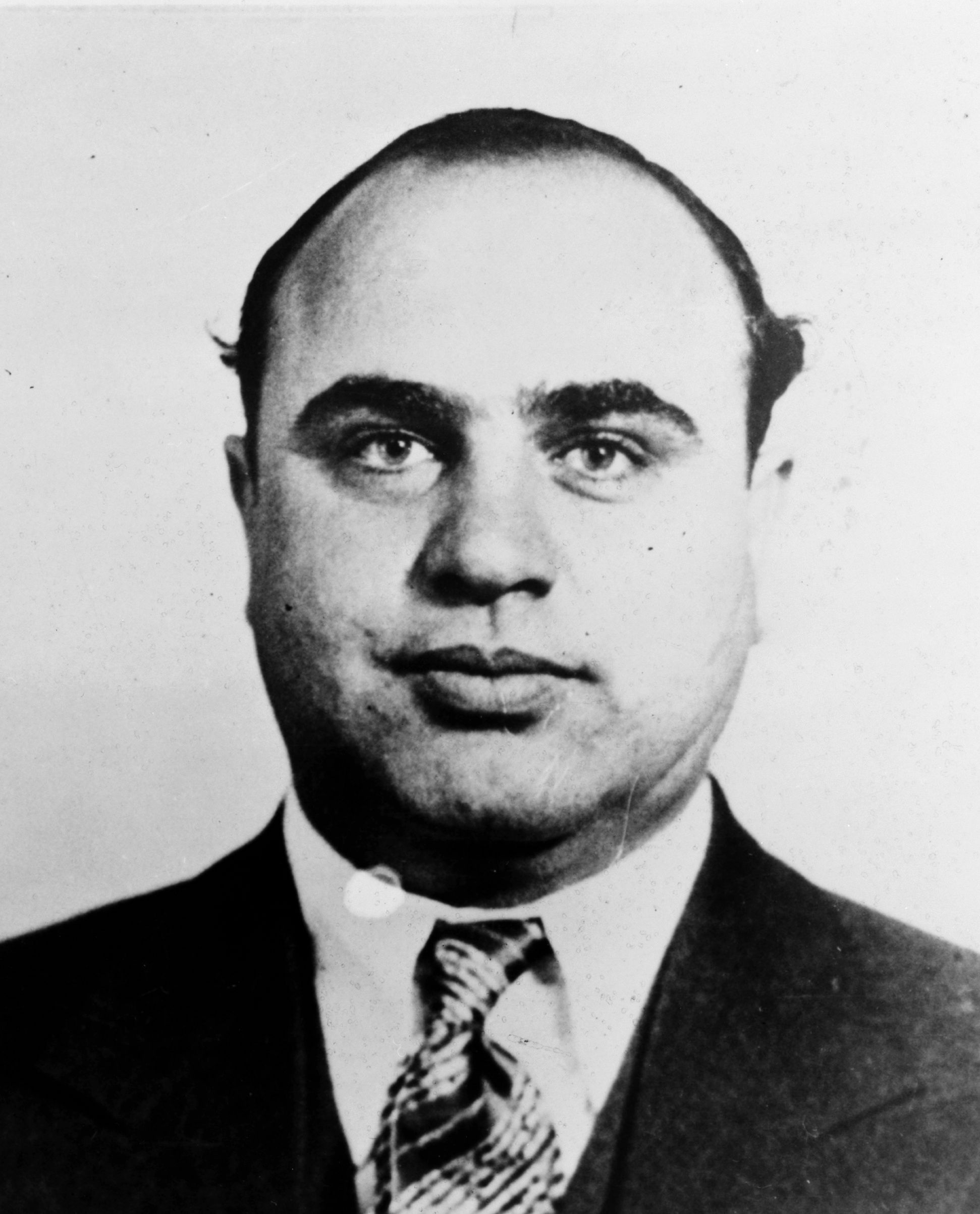
Al Capone

In 1919, New York mobster Al Capone moved to Chicago to help South Side Gang boss John Torrio deal with rival bootleggers. After Campagna's release from the reformatory, Capone summoned him to Chicago to become his bodyguard. In the long bloody war with the rival North Side Gang, Campagna proved to be a reliable gunman. During this violent period, Campagna reportedly slept on a cot outside Capone's suite at Chicago's Lexington Hotel, ready to protect his boss. Campagna also worked with Calabrian Frankie LaPorte, the Chicago Heights boss, and was believed to be Capone's boss who reported back to the Commission for Chicago.

Known for his reckless and unpredictable nature, Campagna attempted to besiege a Chicago police station in November 1927. Bootlegger Joe Aiello, an ally of the North Side Gang, had unsuccessfully attempted to bribe a hotel chef to poison Capone. In retaliation, Capone placed a $50,000 bounty on Aiello. When Campagna discovered that Aiello was in jail on a murder conspiracy charge, he and 20 other Outfit gunmen went to the station to try to get him. When Campagna arrived, the police noticed that he was carrying a handgun and immediately arrested him. The police then placed Campagna in a cell next to Aiello's. An undercover police officer in a nearby cell later overheard the following exchange in Sicilian between the two mobsters:

Campagna: "You're dead, dear friend, you're dead. You won't get to the end of the street still walking."

Aiello: "Can't we settle this? Give me fourteen days and I'll sell my stores, my house and everything and quit Chicago for good. Can't we settle it? Think of my wife and my baby."

Campagna: "You dirty rat! You've broke faith with us twice now. You started this, we'll finish it."

On October 23, 1930, Aiello was shot to death while leaving a Chicago apartment. During the autopsy, a coroner reported removing 59 bullets weighing over a pound from Aiello's body. No one was charged in Aiello's murder.

== Labor racketeering ==
Following Capone's 1931 conviction for tax evasion, Campagna rose through the Outfit ranks as an extortionist and labor racketeer under Outfit boss Paul "The Waiter" Ricca. In 1934, Campagna invested approximately $1,500 of his own money in two illegal gambling dens in Cicero, Illinois. He would eventually net $75,000 per year from this investment.

In 1935, Campagna participated in the Outfit infiltration of the Chicago Bartenders & Beverage Dispensers Union. In 1940, the union head obtained a temporary injunction against Campagna and other Outfit members. However, when the case went to trial, the union leader refused to testify and case was dismissed. In 1943, Campagna and his associates stole about $900,000 from the treasury of the Retail Clerks International Protective Association, Local 1248, in Chicago. The funds were never recovered.

During the early 1940s, Campagna extorted $1 million from the U.S. film industry through the takeover of the International Alliance of Theatrical, Stage Employees & Motion Picture Operators Union in Los Angeles. When Willie Morris Bioff, Campagna's front man with the union, was arrested on another charge, he sent word to Campagna that he wanted to leave the Outfit. Campagna then visited Bioff in prison and gave him the following answer:

Anybody who resigns, resigns feet first."

After this encounter, the frightened Bioff became a government witness and assisted in the 1943 extortion case against Campagna.

== Prison ==
On March 18, 1943, Campagna and other Outfit mobsters were indicted in New York on charges of extorting the Hollywood film industry. On December 22, 1943, Campagna was convicted of extortion. He was sentenced a week later to ten years imprisonment in Atlanta Federal Penitentiary. Louis then turned to his cousin Albert Campagna for help. However, Albert wanted nothing to do with his cousin Louis for fear that his children would become targets. Soon after Louis' imprisonment, his wife Charlotte successfully petitioned the government to transfer him closer to Chicago at Leavenworth Federal Penitentiary in Leavenworth, Kansas. In the late 1940s, a group of Campagna associates collected over $190,000 to pay his tax debt to the federal government (reduced from $470,000).

In August 1947, after 42 months in prison, Campagna was released on parole his first of eligibility. Outfit boss Anthony Accardo had reportedly bribed a district attorney to facilitate Campagna's quick release. The rapid parole of Campagna and his associates created a firestorm of protest in Chicago. The U.S. Department of Justice went to court to revoke the parole, but was unsuccessful.

After his release, Campagna returned to Chicago to work for the Outfit under boss Sam Giancana.

== Final years ==
In the early 1950s, Campagna was summoned to testify before the U.S. Senate in the Kefauver Hearings on organized crime. However, apart from revealing his income from the Cicero gambling operations, Campagna did not provide any useful testimony. In his later years, Campagna spent time at his two farms in Fowler, Indiana and Berrien Springs, Michigan, as well as his house in Berwyn, Illinois.

On May 30, 1955, Campagna was fishing on his lawyer's boat in Biscayne Bay in Florida. After reeling in a 30-pound (13.6 kg.) grouper fish, Campagna suffered a fatal heart attack. Since the Roman Catholic Church denied Campagna a Requiem Mass, a memorial service was held at a funeral home in Berwyn, Illinois. Campagna was buried at Mount Carmel Cemetery in Hillside, Illinois, in what observers described as the most lavish mob funeral since Capone's death.
