= Charles Gargotta =

American mobster (1900–1950)

- Born: December 13, 1900; Kansas City, Missouri, U.S.
- Died: April 6, 1950 (aged 49); Kansas City, Missouri, U.S.
- Other name: Mad Dog
- Occupation: Gangster
- Allegiance: Kansas City crime family

Charles Gargotta, also known as "Mad Dog", (1900–1950) was a Kansas City, Missouri, gangster who became a top enforcer for the Kansas City crime family.

Born in Kansas City, Gargotta joined the criminal organization of boss John Lazia as a young man. Gargotta and his close associate, Charles Binaggio built a gambling ring that grossed as much as $34,500,000 a year on dice and card games, numbers racket, and bookmaking. Gargotta was arrested more than 40 times over a 30-year period for murder, illegal gambling, liquor law violations, carrying a concealed weapon, robbery, auto theft, extortion, attempted burglary, and vagrancy. However, due to Gargotta's political influence, all of these charges were eventually dropped.

In 1933, Lazia's control over organized crime in Kansas City was challenged by Joe Lusco and Ferris Anthon, two other Kansas City mobsters. Lazia tasked Gargotta and several other mob associates to kill Anthon. On August 12, 1933, the gunmen shot Anthon as he was entering his apartment building in Kansas City. However, County Sheriff Tom Bash and Sheriff Deputy Lawrence Hodges came upon the scene, and opened fire. Two of Lazia's men were killed and one escaped. During the firefight, Gargotta leaped from the car, emptied a Colt .45 automatic at Bash, and then surrendered, yelling, "Don't shoot me – Don’t shoot me!"

In 1935, Gargotta was indicted for the 1933 attempted murder of Bash. However, Gargotta had strong allies in the law enforcement and legal community. The court granted 29 continuances before the case finally came to trial. Kansas City police officers switched the evidence tags on several guns recovered at the scene so as to shed doubt on the question of who held the murder weapon. Testimony of sheriff Bash and a ballistics expert placed the murder weapon securely in Gargotta's hands, but the jury had been bribed. Gargotta was acquitted of the homicide charge and convicted of the illegal possession of a gun, sentenced to a minimum term, and released promptly. Eventually, over the protest of the police department, the Governor of Missouri pardoned Gargotta. The police officer who changed the evidence tags was eventually convicted of perjury and sent to jail.

On April 5, 1950, Binaggio and Gargotta drove to the Jackson County, Missouri Democratic Club in Kansas City to meet a trusted associate. A taxi driver later discovered the bodies in the club, each with four bullet wounds to the head. Gargotta was sprawled on the floor near the door, under a large portrait of then-president Harry S. Truman. In February 1950, Gargotta had testified before a federal grand jury in Kansas City about his criminal activities. Underworld outrage over Gargotta's testimony may have led to his assassination. Another theory is that the Mafia Commission in New York ordered Binaggio's murder because he had failed to keep promises to the Commission. The two murders were never solved.

However, the high-profile murders of Gargotta and Binaggio, along with their subversion of the criminal justice system, created public pressure on President Harry Truman to support a congressional investigation into organized crime. This resulted in the famous Kefauver Commission hearings in the U.S. Senate, named after Senator Estes Kefauver. During these hearings, Kefauver made the following observation:

If ever a human being deserved the title of "Mad Dog" it was Gargotta.
