= Charles Carrollo =

American mobster

Charles Vincent "Charlie the Wop" Carrollo (born Vincenzo Carollo; August 25, 1902 – September 26, 1979) was an Italian-born Kansas City, Missouri crime boss during the 1930s.

Carrollo was born in Santa Cristina Gela, an Arbëreshë town in the province of Palermo, Sicily, and emigrated with his family to the United States when he was two years old, initially settling in New York City before moving to Kansas City. His father was Antonio Carrollo and his mother Rosa Maria Carrollo.

Carrollo was a childhood friend of future Kansas City mob boss John Lazia. During the early 1920s, when Lazia was arrested for bootlegging, Carrollo accepted responsibility for the crime and went to prison for a short time. By the late 1920s, Lazia controlled all organized crime in Kansas City and Carrollo was a top lieutenant. The Black Hand, who were murderers and extortionists was separate from organized crime in the 1920s-1930s.

On the night of July 10, 1934, Carrollo drove Lazia and his wife Marie to their apartment building. When Lazia got out of the car, an unidentified "hit team" gunned him down in a hail of submachine gun fire. Lazia last words were for Carrollo to drive Marie to safety. Carrollo and Marie Lazia escaped unharmed. The murder was never solved. With the aid of the Kansas City Pendergast political organization, Carrollo became the new mob boss. Carollo and newly appointed Kansas City police chief Otto Higgins became closely involved in numerous criminal activities.

In 1939, Treasury Agents under Secretary Henry Morgenthau Jr. started pursuing Carrollo. Carrollo responded by refusing any warrants and harassed the agents. However, on October 20, 1939, Carrollo, Higgins, and Tom Pendergast were convicted of income tax evasion and sent to Leavenworth Federal Penitentiary in Leavenworth, Kansas. While at Leavenworth, Carrollo was discovered trafficking in contraband within the prison and was transferred to Alcatraz, the high security prison in San Francisco Bay. Carrollo was released from prison in 1946.

Carrollo was eventually deported to Italy in 1954. In 1979, Carrollo died of natural causes in Kansas City.

Business positions
Preceded by John Lazia	Kansas City crime family Boss; 1934–1939	Succeeded by Charles Binaggio
