= Anthony Civella =

American mobster and head of the Kansas City crime family (1930-2006)

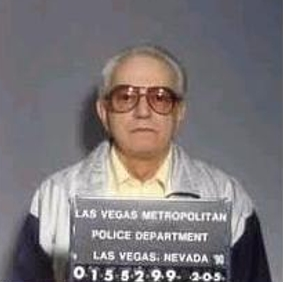
Anthony Civella

Anthony Thomas "Tony Ripe" Civella (February 17, 1930 – February 14, 2006) was an American mobster who was head of the Kansas City crime family.

Anthony was born in Kansas City, Missouri. His criminal record started in 1952. As a young man, he started working in the Kansas City criminal organization, which was run by his uncle, Nicholas Civella.

In 1983, Nicolas Civella died and leadership of the organization passed to Carl "Cork" Civella, Anthony's father. Carl put Anthony in charge of running the organization's gambling interests, which included the Tropicana, Fremont, and Stardust casinos in Las Vegas, Nevada.

In 1984, Anthony and Carl Civella were convicted of skimming casino profits from their Las Vegas casinos and Anthony received five years in prison. After his conviction, Carl passed control of the Kansas City organization to Anthony, who would run it from prison through acting boss William "Willie the Rat" Cammisano. In either 1988 or 1989, Anthony was released from prison.

In 1992, Anthony was convicted of reselling stolen prescription drugs. Civella and two associates purchased more than $1 million in prescription drugs at steep discounts for use in nursing homes, but then illegally resold the drugs at a high profit to West Coast wholesalers. In 1994, Carl Civella died. Despite an appeal to president Bill Clinton, Anthony Civella was denied permission to attend his father's funeral.

In 1997, Civella was released from prison. During this period, the Nevada Gaming Commission banned Civella from any connection with Nevada casinos. His young granddaughter resided with him following his release until early 2001.

In 2006, at age 75, Anthony Civella died of cardiac problems while golfing in Arizona.

Business positions
Preceded by Carl Civella	Kansas City crime family Boss; 1984–2006	Succeeded by John Sciortino
