= Rudolph Santobello =

American mobster

Rudolph Santobello (1928 – May 2013) was a New York mobster who served as a caporegime in the Genovese crime family.

On July 21, 1950, Santobello and Joseph Corbo murdered Alfred Loreto, an off-duty New York Police Department officer, during an attempted kidnapping of Ralph Sgueglia, a butcher arriving home after work, in the Bronx section of New York. Apprehended at the crime scene, Santobello later testified that police brought him to the police station and interrogated him all night. Santobello also claimed that police hit him on the head with their guns and dazed him with a blow on the nose with a billy club. In June 1951, Santobello was convicted of first degree murder and sentenced to life in prison.

In 1966, a U.S. Supreme Court decision on illegal searches by police resulted in Santobello's sentence being reversed and his release from prison. In 1968, detective and whistleblower Frank Serpico arrested Santobello in the South Bronx for numbers running. Santobello was later sentenced to one year in prison, but was freed early due to another court decision on plea bargains. In later years, Santobello supervised a crew from his headquarters at "Club Arthur's', a social club on Arthur Avenue in the Bronx. From 1991 on, Santobello was heavily involved in loansharking, illegal gambling in the form of craps games, bookmaking, and numbers running.

On October 24, 1994, Santobello was convicted on ten counts of gambling and was sentenced on March 27, 1995 to 78 months in prison. Relaxed and joking during the trial, Santobello pleaded with the judge for leniency at the sentencing hearing, citing his family ties:

This has been a very delicate situation for me. After getting married, having a daughter, I don't think I would be so foolish to subject myself to going back to prison at this stage of my life. I've done my best to bring my daughter up in the right manner.

Santobello also claimed that the police had a vendetta against him because of his reversed 1950 murder conviction. On June 12, 2000, Santobello was released from federal prison.

In May 2013, Santobello died of natural causes.

== In popular culture ==
The 1973 Sidney Lumet film Serpico dramatized the Santobello arrest.
