= Charles Panarella =

American mobster (1925–2017)

- Born: January 5, 1925; Brooklyn, New York, U.S.
- Died: July 18, 2017 (aged 92)
- Other names: Charlie Moose; Len Conforti; Chas Esposito; John Garguilo; Charles Panarello
- Allegiance: Colombo crime family
- Criminal charges: Assault, burglary, extortion, possession of a loaded firearm
- Penalty: Conspiracy (1994; 18 months imprisonment)

Charles Joseph Panarella a.k.a. "Charlie Moose" a.k.a. "Len Conforti" a.k.a. "Chas Esposito" (January 5, 1925 – July 18, 2017) was a New York City mobster and capo in the Colombo crime family with a brutal reputation as a hitman.

== Early life ==
Panarella was born in 1925 in Brooklyn, New York. He is also known to have used January 5, 1922 as his birth date. He used the aliases Charles Panarello, Chas Esposito, John Garguilo, Joseph Charles Panarella and Charles "Moose" Panarella. He stood at 6 ft (1.8 m) tall, had brown eyes and a scar on his bottom lip. In 1940, Panarella was arrested for the first time. His criminal record included assault, burglary, extortion and possession of a loaded firearm.

On August 11, 1972, Albert Gallo, brother of the late rogue Profaci crime family capo Crazy Joe Gallo (killed on April 7, 1972), had pinpointed Joseph (Joe Yak) Yacovelli, Alphonse (Allie Boy) Persico Sr., Gennaro Langella and at least one other Colombo hood (thought to be Panarella) at the bar of the Neapolitan Noodle located at 320 East 79th Street in Midtown Manhattan. Minutes before the hit men arrived, however, the mobsters had moved to another table. In their place were five meat dealers from Chicago with their wives celebrating the engagement of one of their daughters to the restaurant's manager. As this party moved to a table, led by the wives, the shooter, dressed in casual clothes and wearing dark glasses and a long black shoulder length wig, opened up with two guns killing Sheldon Epstein and Max Tekelch and wounding two other men. The killer escaped and was never found. The public outrage was led by New York City Mayor John V. Lindsay, who promised running the gangsters out of town. Panarella was unharmed. Panarella once allegedly forced a man to eat his own testicles before killing him. Panarella survived several feuds within the Colombo family that killed more than 100 people.

While in New York, Panarella had a large profitable crew that included Gregory Scarpa Sr. The crew trafficked in narcotics, robbed banks, and controlled sheet metal and restaurant unions.

== Exile to Las Vegas ==
In 1994, Panarella was convicted of attempting to launder money through the Maxim Casino (now called the Westin Las Vegas) in Las Vegas as part of a scheme to purchase a farm for $500,000 to $1 million. Panarella had drug profits deposited at a cashier's cage at the casino. In August 1994, Panarella pleaded guilty to conspiracy and served 15 months of an 18-month sentence. In September 1996, Panarella was released from prison.

== Back to New York ==
Although living in Las Vegas, Panarella still kept some responsibilities back East. For a period of time, he was shuttling back to Brooklyn to oversee the Colombo family's interests in Locals 14 and 15 of the International Union of Operating Engineers.

In the summer of 2001, Panarella met in New York with Genovese family representatives over a dispute in Brooklyn. The Genovese family controlled most of the so-called "no-show" construction jobs in Brooklyn and the Colombo family wanted their fair share of them. Unfortunately for Panarella, the meeting location was bugged and law enforcement picked up clear evidence that he was acting as a member of the Colombo family.

On December 4, 2003, Panarella was indicted in New York on a federal racketeering charge in connection with alleged labor law violations and construction payoffs. The charges were linked to alleged payoffs within Locals 14 and 15 of the International Union of Operating Engineers and to fraud in the construction of Richmond County Bank Ballpark, home of the Staten Island Yankees baseball team, and in construction of the Brooklyn General Post Office.

In February 2008, Panarella was living under house arrest at his home in Kunkletown, Pennsylvania. The trial based on his 2005 racketeering indictment had been delayed due to Panarella's ill health and psychological problems.

In December 2012, a federal judge granted Panarella permission to travel to Long Island City, Queens in April 2013 to receive an award from his former union. It was reported that Panarella was confined to a motorized scooter and depended on portable oxygen. On July 26, 2019, the Las Vegas Review-Journal reported that the Nevada Gaming Commission had removed Panarella's name from its Black Book in a unanimous vote after the attorney general's office submitted Panarella's death certificate which revealed that he had died on July 18, 2017. “Because Mr. Panarella is deceased, he no longer poses a threat to the Nevada gaming industry, so therefore the (state Gaming Control) Board respectfully requests his removal,” Deputy Attorney General Tiffany Breinig said in remarks to the commission.
