= Peter Simone =

American organized crime figure (1945–2025)

Peter Joseph Simone (June 14, 1945 – June 12, 2025) was an American organized crime figure from Kansas City, Missouri, who was thought to be involved in running illegal gambling activities.

In April 1992, Simone was convicted of money laundering in a video poker scam and sentenced to four years' imprisonment. Simone was released in 1996 and placed on three years' probation. In May 1997, Simone was listed in the Missouri Gaming Commission "Black Book", which bars undesirables from entering Missouri casinos.

On January 2, 1999, only two months before the end of his probation period, Simone was caught playing craps at Harrah's North Kansas City Hotel & Casino. Although sentenced to spend one day in jail, Simone's probation period was extended 12 months with four months of electronically monitored house arrest. Later in 1999, Simone violated probation again as Federal Bureau of Investigation (FBI) agents observed him at a strip club for over three hours. This time, Simone went back to prison.

On February 29, 2000, Simone was released from federal custody. He was thought by the FBI to be the underboss of the Kansas City crime family. Simone died on June 12, 2025, at the age of 79.
