= Anthony Centracchio =

Anthony Centracchio (October 12, 1929 – August 6, 2001) was a reputed mob boss in the Chicago Outfit who died in 2001 while awaiting trial on federal racketeering charges.

== Role as Chicago Outfit leader ==
In 1997, the Chicago Sun-Times identified Centracchio as heading up the Chicago Outfit's operations in DuPage County, Illinois. And in July 1997, the Sun-Times identified Centracchio as heading up the Outfit's operations in Chicago's western suburbs and on Chicago's West Side. In 1999, the Chicago Tribune identified Centracchio as being one of only three area bosses reporting to Chicago's two top mob bosses.

== Chicago Outfit career ==
In 1962, Centracchio was convicted of stealing two trucks containing $75,000 worth of TVs and radios. Centracchio wound up serving about 18 months in federal prison. Centracchio also was once described as a lieutenant of longtime Chicago Outfit boss Joseph Lombardo.

For much of his career, Centracchio operated legitimate businesses, including an abortion clinic on Chicago's West Side that had been incorporated in 1990. Centracchio also owned part of a carpet company and a jewelry shop.

In January 1996, Chicago newspapers reported that Centracchio was the subject of a federal probe that involved him allegedly paying the former chief of police of Northlake, Illinois and the former chief of detectives of Stone Park, Illinois to protect illegal poker machines, entertainment and vice in the two suburbs. Investigators were alleged to have installed a hidden camera in Centracchio's office, as well as bugging the phones of the two officers. The former Northlake police chief, Seymour Sapoznik, pleaded guilty in February 1997, admitting he accepted payoffs from the mob from 1990 until 1994. Sapoznik later was sentenced to seven years and four months in federal prison.

On May 3, 1999, Centracchio was charged by federal officials with bribing the mayor of Stone Park, Illinois and a former Franklin Park, Illinois police officer with monthly payments dating back to 1978 to protect illegal video gambling operations in the two suburbs. Centracchio also was charged with extortion in connection with collecting "street taxes" from several adult bookstores and theaters in Illinois and Wisconsin. In addition, Centracchio was charged with possessing a firearm as a felon. The indictment also alleged that Centracchio had been involved in illegal gambling operations since 1978 and had been the boss since mob boss Louis Eboli died in 1987. Finally, Centracchio was charged with paying protection money to police and village officials in Northlake, Illinois, and Melrose Park, Illinois. Centracchio was released on bond awaiting trial.

Centracchio pleaded not guilty to the charges, with a trial scheduled for 2001. In February 2001, federal prosecutors released transcripts of conversations between Centracchio and a strip club owner explaining the monthly protection payoffs that he paid to police officials in various suburbs.

Centracchio died in August 2001

== Death ==
Centracchio died of cancer at his home in Oak Brook, Illinois, which is an upscale Chicago suburb.
