= Anthony Gizzo =

American mobster (1902–1953)

- Born: Anthony Robert Gizzo; August 4, 1902; New York City, U.S.
- Died: April 1, 1953 (aged 50); Dallas, Texas, U.S.
- Occupation: Mobster
- Allegiance: Kansas City crime family

Anthony Robert Gizzo (August 4, 1902 – April 1, 1953) was a Kansas City, Missouri mobster with the Cosa Nostra and a boss of the Kansas City crime family.

Gizzo was born in New York City and was known as "Tony". In the early 1920s, after being arrested on a narcotics charge, Gizzo attempted to bribe a federal officer with $10,000 ($160,714 today). Gizzo was convicted and in 1924 served one year and a day at Leavenworth Federal Penitentiary in Leavenworth, Kansas.

Gizzo was a close friend of mobster Charles Binaggio. In 1930, Gizzo and Binaggio were arrested in Denver, Colorado, on a minor charge. During this time, both men were lieutenants to Kansas City North End political boss John Lazia in his illegal gambling operations. Gizzo soon became known as one of the five "Iron Men" due to his underworld clout.

In 1950, with Binaggio's murder, it is believed that Gizzo assumed leadership of the Kansas City family.

On April 1, 1953, Gizzo died in Dallas, Texas.

Business positions
| Preceded by Charles Binaggio | Kansas City crime family Boss; 1950–1953 | Succeeded by Nicholas Civella |
