= Frank Piccolo =

American mobster

Frank Louis Piccolo also known as Frank Lanza (July 2, 1921 – September 19, 1981), was a caporegime in the Gambino crime family in the Bridgeport, Connecticut faction who became involved in a famous extortion case with the singer Wayne Newton.

== Biography ==
Born on July 2, 1921, in New York City, Piccolo was the only son of Francesco Piccolo and Fannie Lanza. Frank Piccolo stood at 6 ft (1.8 m) tall and weighed 200 pounds (91 kg) with black hair, brown eyes, and a husky build. He was married to Virginia Paglinco and was the father of four children. Piccolo and his family lived in Bridgeport, Connecticut. He was the cousin of Guido Penosi.

In 1980, Piccolo attempted to blackmail money from Wayne Newton. Newton was trying to disengage himself from a financial investment in a Las Vegas, Nevada tabloid newspaper, but was being threatened by his partners in the venture. When the Las Vegas Police Department was unable to stop the threats, Newton turned to his friend Guido Penosi for help. Penosi referred Newton to Piccolo, who then used his influence to stop the threats. Piccolo then performed a similar favor for Newton's business advisor.

At this point, Piccolo wanted a quid pro quo from Newton. Piccolo started pressuring the business advisor to purchase life insurance for singer Lola Falana from a selected insurance agent. Piccolo also told some of his associates in New York that he was going to be a "silent partner" with Newton in his attempt to purchase the Aladdin Hotel and Casino (now called the Planet Hollywood Resort and Casino) in Las Vegas. By this time, the Federal Bureau of Investigation (FBI) was listening in on Newton's conversations with the mobsters. On June 12, 1981, Piccolo and Penosi were indicted in Connecticut on charges of conspiring to extort money and "valuable rights" from Newton and Falana. However, Piccolo was dead by the time the trial started.

On September 19, 1981, Piccolo was shot to death in a telephone booth on a street in Bridgeport. Piccolo was reportedly killed on the orders of Gambino boss Paul Castellano. Piccolo was killed because he had been trying to encroach on the Genovese crime family's control of rackets in Connecticut. Not wanting to risk lucrative construction rackets the Gambinos shared with the Genovese family, Castellano ordered Piccolo's murder.

== See also ==
- Floyd Abrams
- Wayne Newton
