= Rocco Racco =

American mobster (1867–1909)

Rocco Racco (1867 – October 26, 1909) was a Calabrian-born mafioso, who immigrated to the United States and settled in the Pennsylvania area in the 1890s. Racco was known as an early American Black Hand leader, extorting fellow Italian immigrants through the use of anonymous letters, which were covered in cryptic images such as black hand prints, skulls and daggers, and threatened the recipient, and in most cases his family with death if the extortion payment demanded was denied. Racco and an associate were responsible for the 1906 murder of a Pennsylvania Game Warden.

On April 24, 1906, the body of Pennsylvania State Game Warden Seely Houk was found in the Mahoning River in the western part of the state. Examination showed that Houk, missing since March 6, had been killed by a shotgun blast to the head. Authorities suspected that local mafiosi poaching in the area killed the warden. An investigation by Detective Dimaio of the Pinkerton Detective Agency suggested that the murderer was most likely already in prison.

Investigators made little progress on the case until an inmate named Candido wrote to Dimaio claiming that the killers were local Calabrian Honored Society boss, Rocco Racco and his brother-in-law, Jim Murdocca. According to Candido, Houk had caught the two men hunting out of season. As a warning to them, Houk shot and killed Racco's favorite hunting dog. In retaliation, the two men killed Houk. By the time Dimaio had reached the prison to interview Candido, another mafiosi named Surace had threatened Candido. Surace refused to cooperate until Dimaio allegedly whispered a password of the Calabrian Società Honorata or Calabrese mafia. Surace immediately confessed that Racco had murdered Houk, which was corroborated by a second witness.

After acquiring the murder weapon from Racco's wife, Dimaio traveled to see the imprisoned suspect. Racco identified the murder weapon as his own and was indicted for murder. Moved to New Castle, Pennsylvania, the trial gained national attention due to constant death threats against witnesses. Thanks to Surace's testimony, Racco was convicted of murder and hanged at the New Castle prison on October 26, 1909. His death certificate lists his age as 42 years, gives his marital status as married, and lists his parents as Joseph Racco and Maria Camisi (which could be an error, the surname Commisso is a popular surname in Calabria.)
