= Kansas City crime family =

Italian-American organized crime group

- Founded: c. 1912; 114 years ago
- Founder: Joseph DiGiovanni
- Founding location: Kansas City, Missouri, United States
- Years active: c. 1912–present
- Territory: Primarily the Kansas City metropolitan area, with additional territory throughout Missouri and in Omaha and Tulsa, as well as Las Vegas
- Ethnicity: Italians as "made men" and other ethnicities as associates
- Membership (est.): 12 made members (2015)
- Activities: Racketeering, gambling, bookmaking, loansharking, extortion, drug trafficking, fraud, bribery, assault, and murder
- Allies: Chicago Outfit; Cleveland crime family; Colorado crime family; Los Angeles crime family; Milwaukee crime family; St. Louis crime family
- Rivals: Various gangs in the Kansas City area

The Kansas City crime family, also known as the Civella crime family or the Kansas City Mafia or the Clique, is an Italian American Mafia crime family based in Kansas City, Missouri, and throughout the Greater Kansas City area. The organization formed during the early 1910s and is named after Nicholas Civella, the family’s longest serving boss, who headed the syndicate from 1953 until his death in 1983.

== History ==
=== Early history ===
The Italian-American organized crime family began when two Sicilian mafiosi known as the DiGiovanni brothers fled Sicily to Kansas City, Missouri, in 1912. Joseph "Joe Church" DiGiovanni and Peter "Sugarhouse Pete" DiGiovanni began making money from a variety of criminal operations or rackets shortly after their arrival.

Their fortunes greatly improved with the introduction of Prohibition, when they became the only group bootlegging alcohol in Kansas City. Their rackets at this time were controlled by John Lazia, who later became the leading figure when the organization expanded. The gang was given virtually a free hand to operate by boss Tom Pendergast, head of the Pendergast Machine that controlled Kansas City's government at the time. Under Pendergast, Kansas City became a wide-open town, where Prohibition was enforced selectively and strategically by the Pendergast-controlled police department. The DiGiovanni family directly benefited from this lack of enforcement of prohibition laws.

=== Post-Prohibition ===
When Prohibition ended in 1933, the family, although already involved in various rackets, allegedly began extorting bars. On July 10, 1934, Lazia was assassinated, probably on the orders of his underboss, Charles Carrollo, who ruled as boss until his arrest in 1939 for tax evasion. His underboss Charles Binaggio then became the new boss and expanded the family's areas of labor into racketeering. With the help of Binaggio, Forrest Smith was elected in the Missouri gubernatorial race of 1948, and he took office on January 10, 1949. Binaggio was seen as a liability to the Mafia's nationwide commission, and it was decided that Binaggio should be killed. He was assassinated on April 6, 1950, and his successor Anthony Gizzo died of a heart attack in 1953.

=== Nicholas Civella ===
The new boss was Nicholas Civella, who greatly expanded the family's rackets and forged alliances with families from other cities, making the organization very powerful. Civella used the Teamsters to fund casinos in Las Vegas. In 1975, Civella was imprisoned on gambling charges for betting on the 1970 Super Bowl, played between the Minnesota Vikings and the Kansas City Chiefs. Around this time, there was a war in the family over control of the River Quay entertainment district, in which three buildings were bombed and several gangsters were killed

=== Operation Strawman ===
The Kansas City FBI, suspecting mob involvement at the Tropicana Casino in Las Vegas, set up a broad investigation, known as Operation Strawman, which involved wiretapping phones of reputed mobsters and their associates in Kansas City. From the evidence collected by taps and other eavesdropping in the late 1970s, the FBI discovered a conspiracy to skim money from the Tropicana Casino.

Operation Strawman learned that Joe Agosto, head of the Tropicana's Folies Bergere show, controlled the skimming in the Tropicana. Agosto was secretly sending cash from the casino to Kansas City organized-crime chief Nick Civella and Joseph Aiuppa of Chicago, as well as Cleveland and Milwaukee mobsters.

In 1981, a grand jury in Kansas City indicted Agosto, Kansas City mob boss Nick Civella, Civella's brother Carl Civella, mob member Carl DeLuna, and Carl Thomas, who had directed the illegal skimming of cash at the Tropicana with two others. The defendants were convicted in 1983.

In January 1992, James Moretina pleaded guilty to a federal money laundering charge and was sentenced to 37 months. Moretina served as president of a firm that distributed illegal video gambling machines. He and his business partner, purported mob underboss Peter J. Simone, operated the Be Amused Vending and Amusement Co. Moretina is the son of Charles Moretina, who was convicted in the 1980s for skimming Las Vegas casino gambling receipts.

=== 21st century ===
William "Willie the Rat" Cammisano, Sr., became the family's next boss until his death in 1995. Anthony Civella then became the new boss. He died in 2006.

The Kansas City family had an estimated 25 made members as of the late 1990s, according to the FBI.

The current boss of the family is believed to be John Joseph Sciortino, also known as "Johnny Joe", godson of Anthony Civella. A recent underboss was believed to be Peter Simone.

On July 21, 2008, Carl "Tuffy" DeLuna, former underboss to Nick Civella and brother-in-law to Anthony Civella, died.

In the early hours of October 20, 2008, the historic Hereford House restaurant in downtown Kansas City was destroyed in a calculated arson attack orchestrated by Rodney J. Anderson, a co-owner of the establishment. The crime was carried out with the assistance of Vincent Pisciotta, a known soldier in the Kansas City Crime Family, and Mark Sorrentino, a long-time criminal associate with ties to the local underworld. The plot was intended to secure over $2.4 million in insurance payouts amid Anderson’s looming bankruptcy.

According to federal prosecutors, Anderson hired Pisciotta—reportedly a loyal enforcer in the remnants of the Kansas City Crime Family to execute the arson in exchange for a portion of the payout. Using security access provided by Anderson, Pisciotta, Sorrentino, and a still-unidentified co-conspirator entered the premises with 14 five-gallon containers of gasoline, strategically placing them throughout the bar to maximize the explosion. The crew disabled the fire suppression systems and used a delayed ignition device, resulting in a violent blast that rocked downtown but miraculously caused no injuries.

The arson was meticulously planned, with surveillance footage later showing a walkthrough of the premises and the actual placement of accelerants. After the fire, Anderson attempted to collect an advance on the insurance claim, which later served as the basis for a federal mail fraud charge.

In 2012, all three were convicted on federal charges, including conspiracy, arson, use of fire in a federal felony, and in Anderson’s case, mail fraud. Pisciotta received a 20-year sentence, while Anderson and Sorrentino were each sentenced to 15 years in federal prison.

On March 9, 2010, the FBI indicted Gerlarmo "Jerry" Cammisano, James Moretina, Michael Lombardo, and James DiCapo for allegedly operating a "multi-million-dollar internet gambling scheme". Jerry Cammisano, son of William "Willie the Rat" Cammisano, served as the "master agent" of the sports bookmaking operation, which was based in the Kansas City area. Prior to the indictment, six individuals pleaded guilty in connection with the investigation, including three – Vincent Civella and brothers Michael and Anthony Sansone – who are the son and grandsons of former Kansas City boss Anthony "Tony Ripe" Civella. Jerry Cammisano's brother, William D. Cammisano, Jr., also pleaded guilty for his role in the sports bookmaking operation.

According to the crime reporter Scott Burnstein in 2015, the Kansas City family is "probably on its last legs" with twelve or fewer "made" members. The family still has some gambling and loansharking with some extortion involving drugs and the strip club industry.

In December 2023, a physical altercation erupted at Cascone's, an Italian restaurant, involving high-ranking members of the organized crime family. Those involved included: underboss Peter "Las Vegas Pete" Simone, his son Joseph "Joe Pete" Simone and several additional associates. The brawl was reportedly sparked by financial issues surrounding Gilhouly's, a bar closely affiliated with the organization, which was experiencing significant losses. Following the incident, family boss John "Johnny Joe" Sciortino swiftly convened a meeting with the individuals involved, issuing stern reprimands.

On June 12, 2025, underboss Peter "Las Vegas Pete" Simone died at the age of 79.

== Historical leadership ==
=== Boss (official and acting) ===
- 1912–1931 — Joseph "Joe Church" DiGiovanni
- 1931–1934 — John "Brother John" Lazia — murdered on July 10, 1934
- 1934–1939 — Charles "Charlie the Wop" Carrollo — convicted in 1939
- 1939–1950 — Charles Binaggio — murdered on April 6, 1950
- 1950–1953 — Anthony Gizzo — died on April 1, 1953
- 1953–1983 — Nicholas Civella — convicted in 1977 and 1980; died on March 12, 1983
  - Acting 1977–1979 — Carl "Tuffy" DeLuna — imprisoned in 1979
  - Acting 1979–1983 — Carl "Cork" Civella — became official boss
- 1983–1984 — Carl "Cork" Civella — convicted in 1984
- 1984–1995 — William "Willie the Rat" Cammisano — died on January 26, 1995
- 1995–2006 — Anthony "Tony Ripe" Civella — arrested in 1992, released 1997; died on February 16, 2006
  - Acting 1995–2006 — John "Johnny Joe" Sciortino — became official boss
- 2006–present — John "Johnny Joe" Sciortino

== Current members ==
=== Administration ===
- Boss — John "Johnny Joe" Sciortino — current boss of the family; Sciortino was formerly a capo and the godson and protégé of former boss Anthony Civella. He was named acting boss by Civella after Civella’s 1995 imprisonment, and Sciortino became the official boss after Civella’s 2006 death. Sciortino is suspected of being involved in the murder of family associate Larry Strada, who was shot to death in the driveway of his home on May 16, 1990. FBI agents testified that the two mobsters charged in the case, John Mandacina and Patrick McGuire, were seen meeting with Sciortino and Peter Simone at Simone's Social Avenue Club in the hours before Strada's murder.

=== Soldiers ===
- Frank DeLuna — soldier. The FBI in Missouri believes he is the aide to Sciortino.
- Nick J. Labruzzo — soldier.
- James Moretina — soldier. In 2010, Moretina pleaded guilty to conducting an illegal gambling business alongside Vincent Civella. He was released from prison on April 27, 2012.
- Vincent Pisciotta — soldier. A career criminal, Pisciotta was charged with second-degree murder in 1980 for a 1978 killing, but a mistrial was declared when a key witness vanished. The witness later reappeared and claimed that he was beaten out of testifying. In 1988, he was indicted for another murder, but charges were reduced to manslaughter and he served 15 years in jail. In 2013, Pisciotta was convicted of arson in an incident where he helped burn down a restaurant for insurance money. He has a projected release date of December 9, 2029.
- John Termini (born December 1939) — soldier. In mid-1968, Termini spent three months in a jail in Missouri for refusing to testify before a grand jury. In July 1991, Termini was indicted for illegal gambling and money laundering. According to prosecutors, Termini placed cigarette machines, jukeboxes, pool tables, and electronic amusement machines, video poker and slot machines inside of bars and restaurants. In 1993, Termini was convicted of money laundering and conducting an illegal gambling business, and sentenced to over two years in prison with supervised release and a fine of $6000.

=== Associates ===
- Rodney J. Anderson — current associate. In June 2010, Anderson was indicted for conspiracy to commit arson and for mail fraud which earned him $2.5 million. In September 2013, Anderson was sentenced to 15 years in prison. Anderson's co-conspirators, Vincent Pisciotta, was sentenced to 20 years in prison, and Mark A. Sorrentino was sentenced to 15 years in prison.
- Vincent C. Abbott
- Michael Albanese
- Michael V. Badalucco
- Joseph Balano (born March 1961) — associate. In January 2014, Balano was indicted for a scheme to defraud the government by failing to pay the IRS more than $493,000. In January 2016, Balano was sentenced to over two years in prison.
- Charles "Little Chuckie Morgan" Caciacopo Jr.
- Carlo Cammisano — son of William Cammisano
- Gerlamo P. Cammisano (born November 1953) — associate and brother of William Cammisano In December 2010, Cammisano was sentenced by former U.S. District Judge Nanette Kay Laughrey to over one year in prison with over $200,000 in forfeiture for his participation in an $3.5 million illegal gambling business from between 2006 and 2009.
- Anthony Civella Jr. (born July 1967) — associate. In November 2014, Civella was sentenced by former U.S. District Judge Gary A. Fenner to two years in prison with $70,000 in restitution for the theft of over $330,000 retrieved from ATM machines from between 2011 and 2013.
- Vincent Civella — (born January 1957) — associate and son of former boss "Tony Ripe" Civella. In 2010, Civella pleaded guilty to conducting an illegal gambling operation that utilized a computer system based in Costa Rica between 2006 and 2009. He was also ordered to forfeit $40,000 to the federal government. He was released from prison on September 23, 2011.
- Nicholas Lafranca
- Ralph Lafranca
- Anthony "Tony Mike" Nigro — grandson of William Cammisano
- Leonard Occhipinto
- Michael Occhipinto
- Peter J. "P.J." Ribaste — associate. Ribaste has been excluded from gambling in the state of Nevada.
- Anthony Sansone
- Michael Sansone
- Charles J. Simone
- Joseph "Joe Pete" Simone — son of former underboss Peter Simone

== Former members ==
- Anthony J. Biase — former capo. Biase operated in Omaha, Nebraska. He died of natural causes on September 21, 1991.
- Thomas Cacioppo – former soldier. Cacioppo was born in February 1913. In the early 1960s, Cacioppo was indicted alongside Nick Civella and Louis Cangelose for illegal gambling. He died in June 2011.
- William "Little Willie" Cammisano Jr. — former capo. Cammisano Jr. was the son of former Kansas City mob boss William "Willie the Rat" Cammisano Sr. His first conviction was in 1989 for obstruction of justice after he intimidated a witness involved in a murder trial; he was released three years later. He had been the suspect of numerous gangland executions during the 1980s. Cammisano is also blacklisted from every casino in Kansas City and Las Vegas. In 2010, he pleaded guilty to running a massive illegal gambling operation which amounted to $3.5 million over the course of three years; he received one year. Cammisano died of COVID-19 on January 17, 2023.
- Anthony Chiavola — former soldier. Chiavola was born in 1918. Chiavola previously served as a former Chicago police officer. In January 1986, Chiavola and his son were sentenced to a five year prison sentence for their involvement in skimming from Las Vegas casinos. He died in 2000.
- Carl "Tuffy" DeLuna — former underboss and acting boss. DeLuna was born in April 1927. In March 1986, DeLuna was sentenced by former U.S. District Judge Joseph Edward Stevens Jr. to 16 years in prison with over $200,000 in fines after he had pled guilty to charges of a $2 million skimming conspiracy involving four casinos in Las Vegas, from between January 1974 and September 1983, in particular the skimming of the Stardust, Fremont, Hacienda and Marina casinos, he was released in 1998. He died in July 2008.
- James Duardi — former soldier. Duardi was born in March 1921. In May 1985, Duardi was indicted for conspiracy to torch a Kansas City tavern and a bingo hall to collect insurance money. He died in December 2010.
- John Mandacina (born December 1946) — former soldier died 2026. In September 1993, Mandacina was convicted of using a firearm, murder for hire, and conspiracy, and was sentenced to life imprisonment. He was granted compassionate release in January 2023.
- Charles Moretina — former soldier. Moretina was born in June 1928. In October 1983, Moretina was sentenced to 20 years in prison for participating in a skimming conspiracy scheme from between June 1978 and February 1979 targeted at the Tropicana casino in Las Vegas. He died in August 2005.
- Peter Joseph "Las Vegas Pete" Simone — former underboss. Simone died on June 12, 2025.
- Peter J. "Pete" Tamburello — Tamburello was born in January 1932. In July 1980, Tamburello was sentenced to two years in prison for attempting to bribe warden Louis Gengler of the Fort Worth, Texas, federal prison, for a sum of $5000 in order to have Nicholas Civella transferred to a different prison. In November 1981, Tamburello was indicted for skimming over $280,000 from the Tropicana hotel and casino from between June 1978 and February 1979. However, in July 1983, he was acquitted. In September 1983, Tamburello pleaded guilty to skimming gambling profits from the Stardust and Fremont hotel casinos in Las Vegas from around $1.6 million from between March 1974 and 1980, and also for filing false tax returns in 1977 and 1978. He died in April 2015, aged 83.

== Former associates ==
- James Bradley Jr. — former associate. Bradley was born in June 1926. In May 1975, Bradley was released from prison after serving a seven-year sentence for post office burglary, conspiracy, receiving stolen property, smuggling contraband into a United States penitentiary, and bribery. In Juny 1979, Bradley was acquitted of armed robbery and firearm charges. He died in November 2015.
- James DiCapo — former associate. DiCapo was born in August 1952. In July 2010, DiCapo pled guilty to conspiracy to traffic more than $400,000 worth of counterfeit designer purses and clothes, and money laundering conspiracy, DiCapo also admitted of operating a $1.2 million illegal sports betting ring. He died in September 2018.
- Michael J. Lombardo — former associate. Lombardo was born in October 1958. In March 2010, Lombardo was charged for illegal sports bookmaking operating under Gerlarmo "Jerry" Cammisano, and amongst other crimes, earning over $3.5 million from March 2006 and April 2009, it is believed Lombardo was responsible for bettors who wagered a total of almost $500,000. In January 2011, Lombardo was sentenced to 1 year in prison for conducting an illegal gambling business. He died in September 2016.

== List of murders committed by the Kansas City crime family ==
Name	Date	Reason
Leon Jordan	July 15, 1970	Jordan was an African-American civil rights leader. Jordan was shot to death by the Kansas City Black Mob on orders of Nick Civella after he had punched a corrupt politician working on behalf of the Kansas City crime family and for also getting into an argument with James Dearborn, the leader of the Kansas City Black Mob.
David Bonadonna	July 22, 1976	Soldier of the Kansas City crime family. Bonadonna was found shot to death in the trunk of his car, allegedly for feuding with Nick Civella and Willie Cammisano over control of the River Quay nightlife district.
John "Johnny B" Brocato	November 17, 1976	Soldier of the Kansas City crime family and Bonadonna loyalist. Brocato was found shot to death inside the trunk of his car at the airport.
John "Johnny Green" Amaro	February 19, 1977	Soldier of the Kansas City crime family and Nick Civella loyalist. Amaro was shot to death at his garage.
Harold "Sonny" Bowen	February 22, 1977	Associate of the Kansas City crime family and Bonadonna loyalist. Bowen was shot and killed by a shotgun blast at a bar in the River Quay district of Kansas City.
Gary Parker	August 5, 1977	Parker was an associate for the Kansas City crime family and Bonadonna loyalist. Parker was killed in an explosion at his house.
Myron "Alley Cat Andy" Mancuso	May 2, 1978	Mancuso was found shot to death in his car, it was revealed Mancuso had met with Willie Cammisano Jr. an hour before his murder, and it has been alleged Cammisano possibly ordered his murder.
Michael "Minuteman Mike" Massey	May 4, 1978	Massey was shot and killed in his car during a gang war, it was later revealed that he was an FBI informant.
Mike Spero	May 17, 1978	Spero was shot and killed, allegedly on orders of Willie Cammisano. Spero had served as a Bonadonna loyalist and had previously attempted and failed to take over Kansas City crime family from Nick Civella.
Joe Spero	June 18, 1980	Spero was allegedly killed in an accidental explosion.
Carl Spero	January 6, 1984	Spero was killed in an explosion at his Five-Star Investment Used Cars lot.
Anthony Cardarella	February 9, 1984	Cardarella had served as a captain for the Kansas City crime family. Cardarella was found strangled to death in the trunk of his car, after he had allegedly plotted against Willie Cammisano, the boss of the Kansas Mafia.
Felix "Little Phil" Ferina	September 19, 1984	Ferina served as a captain for the Kansas City crime family, it is believed Ferina was shot to death at his home for attempting a coup against the Kansas City crime family boss, Willie Cammisano.
James "Doc" Dearborn	January 14, 1985	Dearborn was a heroin dealer and leader of the 'Purple Capsule Gang' based in Kansas City, it is believed Dearborn was shot to death for attempting to overthrow Willie Cammisano and to take control of his rackets.
Roger Reid	August 18, 1988	Associate for the Kansas City crime family, he was found strangled to death inside his hotel room, allegedly stemming from gambling debts owed to Willie Cammisano.
Larry Strada	December 17, 1990	Associate for the Kansas City crime family, shot and killed outside his home in Gladstone, Missouri after it was learnt that Strada was cooperating with the authorities.
Harold Ash	November 27, 1996	Associate and bookmaker for the Kansas City crime family, Ash was allegedly killed by suspected robbers, after he had left the Harrah's casino in North Kansas City, winning approximately $3000 to $4000 at the casino.

== In media ==
In August 2008, retired FBI agent William Ouseley published his history of the KC crime family from 1900 to 1950 in a book titled Open City.

On March 20, 2009, Blackhand Strawman, a documentary of Kansas City's organized crime history, was released in theaters in Kansas City.

On March 1, 2011, retired FBI agent William Ouseley published his history of the KC crime family from 1950 to 2000 in a book titled Mobsters in Our Midst.

On November 25, 2013, the documentary film Gangland Wire was released. This film uses audio clips from FBI wiretaps to tell the story of law enforcement uncovering a massive conspiracy to control Las Vegas casinos.

The FX crime drama anthology series Fargo portrays a fictional Kansas City Italian mafia both in season 2 and season 4, but which has no resemblance to real-life Kansas city crime syndicates.

== See also ==
- Crime in Missouri
- List of Italian Mafia crime families
