= William Cammisano =

American mobster and part of crime family

William "Willie the Rat" Dominick Cammisano Sr. (April 26, 1914 – January 26, 1995) was an American mobster and enforcer for Nicholas Civella's Kansas City crime family.

== Biography ==
Cammisano began his criminal activity in his youth and had an extensive rap sheet by the age of 15 in 1929. His arrest record continued to grow into early adulthood, including citations for carrying a concealed weapon, bootlegging, pistol whipping a robbery victim, running an alcohol still, being AWOL from the U.S. Army, disturbing the peace, and gambling. Convicted of a felony in federal court, he served a sentence at Federal Correctional Institution, El Reno which became the namesake of a tavern he operated, the El Reno Bar, in the 1940s.

Cammisano was an enforcer of Nicholas Civella's organization in the Kansas City branch of La Cosa Nostra. The two men met in the 1940s through Democrat political circles; as the mafia in Kansas City was closely tied to politics.

Both William Cammisano and his brother, Joseph, were indicted for "conspiracy to extort the property of Fred Bonadonna" on June 16, 1978. Fred Bonadonna, a former associate of Camissano who turned government witness, described how Cammisano's used strong arm tactics in the River Quay neighborhood to forward their interests in establish adult entertainment businesses in that neighborhood. Bondanna and his father David opposed the Camissano's and David Bonadonna was killed by gunfire in June 1976 with his body discovered in the trunk of his car on June 22. Rather than go to trial, the Cammisano brothers entered into plea agreements and were sentenced on November 22, 1978, with William was sentenced to 5 years in prison for extortion. The case was later summarized in a report to the United States Senate in 1988. In 1980 Cammisano was ordered to appear before a U.S. Senate Subcommittee investigating organized crime activity in Kansas City. Cammisano refused to cooperate with the committee; he was cited for Contempt of Congress on May 14, 1981, and received added prison time.

With Civella's conviction in 1983, Cammisano became the new leader of the Kansas City organization. In January 1988 Civella was released from prison and resumed his leadership of the Kansas City organization.

In 1990 Cammisano was convicted and lived his final years in prison. On January 26, 1995, William Cammisano died of multiple organ failure related to lung disease.

== Family ==
William Cammisano is the father and namesake of William "Willie" Dominick Cammisano Jr. born May 8, 1949, in Kansas City, Missouri. Willie Jr is listed in the infamous "Black Book", the Nevada Gaming Control Board list of excluded persons. It is believed Willie Jr owned a share of the Argent Casino in Las Vegas and met with Chicago mafia members to discuss retrieving his portion of the sale price and skim monies from that casino.

William's other son Gerlarmo "Jerry" Cammisano pleaded guilty in 2011 to federal charges he ran a $3.5 million illegal sports betting ring. Jerry was sentenced to 14 months in prison and ordered to forfeit $201,137, according to records. Jerry's son, Vito Cammisano is a swimmer that attended the University of Missouri. Vito became well known when he was filmed kissing his boyfriend Michael Sam right after it was announced that Sam would be the first openly gay NFL football player to be drafted, when the St. Louis Rams picked him in the seventh round of the 2014 draft.
