= Anthony J. Cardarella =

American mobster

- Born: 1926
- Died: February 1984 (aged 57–58); Kansas City, Missouri, U.S.
- Other name: "Tiger"

Anthony J. "Tiger" Cardarella (1926–1984) was a Kansas City, Missouri Cosa Nostra figure who was involved in large-scale fencing operations.

Cardarella was the owner of Tiger's Records shop on Independence Avenue in Kansas City and Overland Park, Kansas. He allegedly paid professional thieves and shoplifters to steal records from other record stores, such as Walmart.

Physically small, Cardarella got his nickname "Tiger" from other boys at Boy Scout camp as an ironic reference to his lifelong fear of bees. This nickname stuck when H. Roe Bartle, the future mayor of Kansas City, referred to him as "this little 'Tiger'" when he handed him a Life Scout award.

Cardarella was a suspect, along with Felix Ferina, in a gangland shooting. Cardarella served five years in prison for receiving stolen property, including firearms.

In February 1984, Cardarella disappeared after leaving a local restaurant. After a family search, police found his body in the trunk of his car. The abandoned car, located near a freight company, had been towed off the street to the city impound lot. Cardarella's body had sat in the trunk for several days before being discovered.

Cardarella was identified by his eldest son. His body was intact; the cause of death was ruled suffocation. A lifelong gambling addict, it is believed that Cardarella was murdered over extensive unpaid gambling debts. His murder remains unsolved.
