= Colonel's Island Railroad =

Short railroad in US state of Georgia

In the late 1960s, the State of Georgia started an improvement project for the port at Brunswick, Georgia. In this project, the Colonel's Island Railroad (reporting mark CISD) was created as a part of the Georgia Ports Authority. The CISD operated 33 miles of track in and around the Brunswick area. In 1998, the railroad sold most of its assets and the Golden Isles Terminal Railroad began operating on the line. The Ports Authority retained ownership of the track, but the CISD was disbanded.
