= Eco James Coli =

Eco James Coli (February 15, 1922 – December 1982) was an alleged labor racketeer in Chicago. Starting in 1945, Coli's arrest record included attempted hijacking and assault and battery. He also was questioned in the murder of a Republican ward committeeman. During the 1950s, Coli received one year on probation for contributing to the delinquency of a minor. In 1952, Coli was sentenced to eight-to-ten years imprisonment for stealing slot machines from a suburban country club, but the Illinois Supreme Court overturned his conviction in 1955.

Coli was also involved in the Teamsters Union. He served as a secretary-treasurer for Chicago Teamsters Union Local 727, made up of parking lot attendants, funeral drivers, directors, embalmers and others. Coli instituted pensions, health insurance and negotiated lucrative contracts for his members during his tenure. Coli would run this local for 20 years up until his death. During the 1969 Chicago Columbus Day Parade, Coli made headlines by walking the parade route next to Chicago Mayor Richard J. Daley and Illinois Governor Richard Ogilvie. Both Daley and Ogilvie claimed ignorance of Coli's criminal background. James Coli died in 1982 from natural causes. Teamsters Local 727 is now run by James Coli's grandson, John Coli.
