= Charles Binaggio =

American gangster (1909–1950)

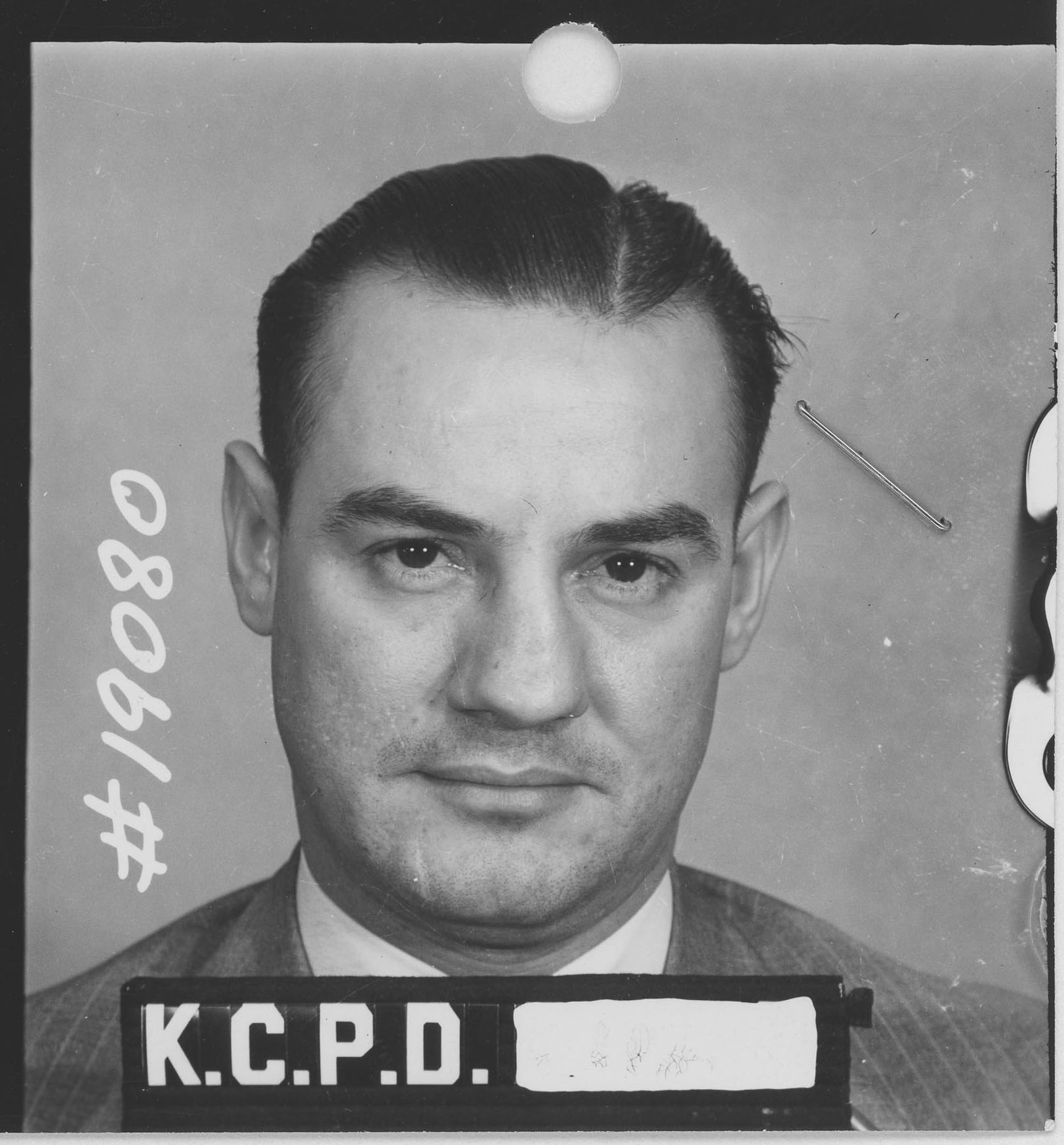
- Binaggio's mugshot from the Kansas City Police Department
- Born: January 12, 1909; Beaumont, Texas, US
- Died: April 6, 1950 (aged 41); Kansas City, Missouri, US
- Cause of death: Murder
- Resting place: Mount Saint Mary's Cemetery, Kansas City, Missouri

Charles Binaggio (January 12, 1909 – April 6, 1950) was an American gangster who became the boss of the Kansas City crime family and concocted a bold plan to control the police forces in Kansas City, Missouri, and St. Louis, Missouri.

== Early life ==
Born on January 12, 1909, in Beaumont, Texas, Binaggio moved with his family to Kansas City, Missouri, at an early age. Binaggio grew up in the city's North Side, which was then heavily populated by Sicilian and Italian immigrants. It isn't known when first Binaggio fell in with the mob; when he did join them, he rose quietly to prominence.

In December 1930, in Denver, Colorado, Binaggio was arrested for the first time at age 21. The police raided a Denver apartment that Binaggio shared with Anthony Gizzo and Tony Casciola, two well-known Kansas City Mafiosi. Searching the apartment, police found a mini-cache of firearms and charged the three with weapons violations. The charges were later reduced to vagrancy and Binaggio was released on bond. As it turns out, Binaggio had been part of a team sent to Denver by then Kansas City boss John Lazia to aid the Denver crime family in a "war" with the crime family from Pueblo, Colorado. In 1931, Binaggio was again arrested in Denver for vagrancy.

Binaggio earned his prominence in the Kansas City family by earning a lot of money from liquor and gambling. On July 20, 1931, Binaggio was arrested in Kansas City following a shootout that killed a Bureau of Prohibition agent and two others. Prohibition agents and local police had raided the mob-run Lusco-Noto Flower Shop at 1039 E. Independence Avenue looking for evidence in a recent "spot" killing. The building was also the headquarters of Joe Lusco, a lieutenant of Lazia. During the raid, a shootout started, followed by a fire. Binaggio, who was in the flower shop during the raid, was arrested and taken in for questioning. However, the police determined that he hadn't taken part in the shootout and released him with a vagrancy charge.

== Rise to power ==
After the Lusco-Noto shootout, Lazia took Binaggio under his wing. Lazia had established a political club, the North Side Democratic Club, in order to increase his mob's power in Kansas City. This led to Binaggio's involvement with the local and State political scene that would last until his death in 1950.

In 1934, Lazia was assassinated and his underboss Charles "Charley the Wop" Carrollo ascended to the crime throne. At some point, Binaggio became Carollo's underboss. In 1939, Carollo was caught up in a citywide clean-up campaign and was sent to prison for income tax evasion. This opened the way for Binaggio to become the Kansas City mob's boss in October 1939.

The Kansas City crime family had always enjoyed a violent reputation. It started back to the turn of the 20th century when the Black Hand version of the Mafia terrorized the city's North Side. The violence had reached a peak during and immediately following the Lazia years (1928–1934), but things had remained relatively quiet under Carollo's rule. This would change under Binaggio as several unsolved mob slayings occurred on his watch.

In November 1941, Binaggio was speeding down Broadway near his Armour Boulevard apartment when he struck and killed a 50-year-old man while crossing the street. Binaggio was arrested and charged with manslaughter, but a coroner's jury refused to indict him. Following this incident, Binaggio was always accompanied by his driver, Nick Penna.

Binaggio and the local mob continued to get rich through their gambling and liquor interests. From the 1930s on, the mob had also been making money through a nationwide narcotics ring. However, this ring was broken up by a major Bureau of Narcotics investigation that netted mafiosi in Kansas City, St. Louis, Tampa, Florida, and other cities. Binaggio himself escaped being linked to this drug ring. However, one of his main lieutenants, Joseph Deluca, was sent to prison when a low-level member of the ring, Carl Caramusa, turned state's evidence. In 1945, Caramusa was found murdered on a Chicago street.

== Pendergast Machine ==
In the early 1940s, Binaggio turned his attention to politics. He formed his own political club, the First Ward Democratic Club and slowly began taking over wards in and near Kansas City's North Side. In the process, Binaggio became a major rival of Jim Pendergast, the nephew of former Kansas City political boss Tom Pendergast, and his Democratic faction. Binaggio's goal was to elect his candidate to the Missouri Governorship.

In 1944, Binaggio's first candidate was defeated in the primary election by the Pendergast candidate. In 1948, Binaggio was more successful. He backed the Democratic nominee Forrest Smith and used his mob connections to help Smith win the election. Binaggio had approached the National Commission of La Cosa Nostra for a loan between $200,000 and $2,000,000 for Smith's election campaign. If he won, the payback would be Smith helping the mob open Missouri to gambling. Binaggio reportedly received the money at the home of Charles Fischetti, a major Chicago Mafioso. At that time, Kansas City was subservient to Chicago in the mob hierarchy. Using mob money and manpower, Binaggio managed to get Smith elected Governor.

The 1948 election also brought President Harry Truman, a Missouri native, election to a full term to the White House. (Note: Truman had been elected Vice-President in 1944 and ascended to the Presidency upon the death of Franklin D. Roosevelt) To celebrate this victory, Binaggio chartered a private railroad car for transportation to the inauguration ceremony in Washington, D.C. However, Truman was a staunch Pendergast supporter and he made it abundantly clear that Binaggio was not welcome at the ceremony.

== Doublecross ==
Despite the election of Binaggio's candidate as government, his gambling plan was doomed to failure. Binaggio's strategy had been to take control over both the Kansas City and St. Louis police departments. Once that control was achieved, mob gambling operations would be safe in both cities. In the late 1930s, both departments had been taken over by the State due to mass corruption within the ranks. Both departments were ruled by separate Boards of Police Commissioners that were appointed by the governor. By controlling the governor, Binaggio hoped to get candidates of his choosing appointed to the Police Boards. With Smith's election, every part of the plan seemed in place.

However, to Binaggio's chagrin, Smith pulled the rug out from under him. Smith made initial appointments to each Police Board, but refused to give a consensus to Binaggio's candidates. Binaggio was denied a majority on both boards. Unable to control the police forces in Kansas City or St. Louis, the syndicate was forced to fold up their new gambling establishments. The crime bosses in Chicago were not happy with the developments in Missouri and they blamed Binaggio for it. They warned Binaggio to fix it, or else. Binaggio desperately tried to bribe one of the Kansas City police commissioners and threatened others, but with no effect. At some point, the Commission decided to make Binaggio pay for his failure to deliver.

== Death ==
On the night of April 6, 1950, Binaggio—aged 41—and his underboss, Charles Gargotta (a notorious enforcer within the Kansas City family), were called to meet some unknown persons at the First Ward Democratic Club near downtown Kansas City. Binaggio left his driver/bodyguard, Nick Penna, at the Last Chance saloon, at a tavern owned by the mob, saying that he would return in a few minutes. Binaggio and Gargotta then borrowed a car and drove off to the Democratic Club.

Shortly after 8 P.M., residents in apartments above the Democratic Club heard several shots. Eight hours later, a cab driver going to a nearby cafe noticed that the club door was open; he also heard water running inside. The police were called and they found the bodies of Charles Binaggio and Charles Gargotta inside the club. Binaggio was seated at a desk and Gargotta was lying inside the front door. Both men had been shot in the head four times with separate .32 caliber revolvers. The police theorized that Gargotta had been trying to escape the club when he was shot in the back of the head. As for the running water heard by the cabbie, it came from a broken toilet and was unrelated to the hit.

Some people theorized that Binaggio and Gargotta were murdered by St. Louis gunmen; others said the hitmen came from Chicago. However, it is most likely that the two mob bosses were killed by members of their own crime family under orders from the Mafia Commission in New York. The probable organizer of the hit was Gizzo, who no doubt received the leadership of the Kansas City family as a reward. In any case, the murderers were never found.

Over 1,200 mourners attended Binaggio's funeral service at Holy Rosary Church and 10,000 people watched the funeral procession to the cemetery. Binaggio was buried in Mount Saint Mary's Cemetery, in Kansas City, Missouri.

Business positions
Preceded by Charles Carrollo	Kansas City crime family Boss; 1939–1950	Succeeded by Anthony Gizzo
