= Ken Eto =

American mobster (1919–2004)

- 衛藤 健
- Born: October 19, 1919; Stockton, California, U.S.
- Died: January 23, 2004 (aged 84); Georgia, U.S.
- Other names: Tokyo Joe
- Years active: 1949–1983

Ken Eto (衛藤 健 Etō Ken; October 19, 1919 – January 23, 2004), also known as Tokyo Joe and "The Jap", was an American mobster with the Chicago Outfit and eventually an FBI informant who ran Asian gambling operations for the organization. He was the highest-ranking Asian-American in the organization and is also notable for his extraordinary survival of a murder attempt.

== Life and career ==
Eto was born in Stockton, California, to a Christian Japanese American family; he had six siblings, brothers and sisters. The family moved several times in Eto's childhood, eventually settling in Los Angeles. His father, Mamoru Eto (1883–1992), was a devout Christian preacher, who had converted to Christianity after time spent living in San Francisco; Eto's father was said to have been shocked at the "degeneracy" of fellow Asian Americans and immigrants he encountered in the city, and thus sought to distance himself and his family (as much as he could) from such a "fate". Eto despised his fanatically religious, overbearing and strict parents; with no more than an eighth grade education—the last school Eto attended was Virgil Junior High School in Los Angeles—he dropped out and ran away, eventually arriving in Portland, Oregon, where he survived for several years working odd jobs and stealing for a living.

On July 1, 1941, Eto registered for the selective service in Seattle, Washington. Eto's selective service registration card states his home address was 306 6th Avenue South, Seattle, Washington, and he was employed as a farmer laborer.

During World War II, Eto was interned, along with countless other Japanese and Japanese Americans, as a result of Executive Order 9066. He subsequently lost contact with his relatives and was sent to Minidoka War Relocation Center, Idaho. While being held at the camp, Eto perfected his gambling and betting skills through card games with other internees. His first formal arrest came in 1942, when he was arrested for violating wartime curfew at the camp. Ultimately, he was detained at the Minidoka War Relocation Center from August 16, 1942, until March 19, 1943.

In 1947, Eto worked as a self-employed gambler, upon his arrival in Chicago, Illinois. In 1949, Eto worked as a casino dealer at the Oriental Club in Denver, Colorado.

In 1949, he moved to Chicago, where he set up an illegal gambling racket known as "bolita" and was managing from $150,000 to $200,000 a week, including $3,000 a week in payoffs to corrupt Chicago police.

On August 1, 1949, Eto flew from Honolulu, Hawaii to San Francisco, California aboard United Airline flight 648. The passenger manifest for this flight reflects that Eto gave his home address as 1234 North Clark Street, Chicago, Illinois.

=== Prison ===
On October 11, 1950, Eto was sentenced in Bannock County, Idaho by Judge Isaac McDougall to 14 year imprisonment for obtaining money under false pretenses. His signed statement concerning the details of this crime and legal proceedings states:

On April 12, 1950, REDACTED and myself bought what we thought were 50 cars of opium. We paid $14,000 for it. REDACTED put up $5,000.00. I put up $5,000.00, and REDACTED put up $4,000.00. After we bought it, we found out it was not opium. REDACTED made a complaint after he found out the stuff was no good. He thought that REDACTED and myself had deliberately obtained money from him for stuff that we knew was no good. That is where the charge of obtaining money under false pretenses comes in. REDACTED and myself thought it really was opium when we bought it. I pleaded not guilty on advice of my lawyer. This took place in Pocatello, Idaho. I immediately left for Chicago after this deal was made. I was brought back to Idaho sometime in March 1950. REDACTED was also tried and sentenced to the Penitentiary, and appealed the case.

On September 12, 1951, Eto was released on parole from prison.

=== Survival of a murder attempt ===
Eto's gambling operation was eventually uncovered by the FBI, and Outfit capo Vincent Solano was afraid that Eto would turn government witness. On February 10, 1983, a few weeks prior to sentencing on his gambling conviction, he was invited to a dinner meeting. Afraid he was going to be shot, he took a bath and put on his best suit before heading out for the meeting. As he was sitting in a parked car, hitmen Jasper Campise and John Gattuso fired three shots into his head; however, the bullets only grazed his skull. After regaining consciousness, he dragged himself into a local pharmacy and called 911.

The 911 recording was played on WBBM-TV, with the call taker demanding to speak to Eto and then asking him if he could drive himself to a hospital. Eventually, a Chicago Fire Department ambulance was sent for him. The failed attempt on Eto's life was blamed on an insufficient amount of gunpowder in the bullet cartridges. The two would-be assassins had handloaded their own ammunition to reduce their chances of being traced to the murder attempt.

=== Turned informant ===
Eto agreed to only work with FBI agent Elaine Smith and turn informant for the FBI. After his trial, he entered the Witness Protection Program. On July 14, 1983, about five months after the unsuccessful hit, the bodies of Eto's would-be assassins were found in the trunk of a car in suburban Naperville, Illinois; the men had been strangled. The FBI stated after the failed murder attempt, they went to Campise and Gattuso and offered to place them in Witness Protection if they testified as to who ordered the killing, but both stated that they were in no danger. Eto testified in court against his former mob partners and helped put away fifteen Outfit mobsters and their associates, including corrupt police officers.

Ken Eto died in Georgia in 2004, aged 84, living under the name Joe Tanaka. He left behind six children. His death was reported over 2 years later.

A documentary about him was made by Ken'ichi Oguri.
