= Samuel Corsaro =

American mobster

Samuel "Little Sammy" Corsaro (1943 - July 5, 2002) was a mobster who belonged to the New Jersey faction of the Gambino crime family. His nickname "Little Sammy" came from his height of 5'5".

== Murder rap ==
Born in Nutley, New Jersey Corsaro later moved to Clifton, New Jersey. As a youth, he became involved in petty crime. In 1974, during a liquor store robbery in Morris County, Corsaro shot and killed a store clerk. Corsaro was convicted of murder and sentenced to life in prison.

In prison, Corsaro organized a program to teach inmates the upholstery and interior design trade in preparation for their release. Using Corsaro's program as proof of his rehabilitation, Corsaro's lawyers petitioned the New Jersey governor for a pardon. In 1983, New Jersey Governor Tom Kean pardoned Corsaro for the 1969 murder. After nine years in prison, Corsaro was released.

== Back on the streets ==
After his release, Corsaro soon returned to criminal activity. He became an associate and then a made man, or full member, of the Gambino family under boss John Gotti. A 1988 report by the New Jersey State Commission investigating organized crime listed Corsaro as being active in loansharking, gambling operations, and drug sales in Essex and Passaic counties in New Jersey. By now, Corsaro was the second ranked member of the New Jersey Gambino faction, just below mobster Robert Bisaccia.

== Prison again ==
On April 21, 1989, Corsaro and other New Jersey mobsters were indicted on conspiracy and racketeering charges. The most serious charge was planning to burglarize and burn down the Fairfield, New Jersey office of the Attorney General, which was the base for the Northern New Jersey Organized Crime Task Force. Other charges included hijacking a truck containing $750,000 worth of cigarettes, conspiring to take over a Bloomfield, New Jersey waste-container concern, and making illegal payoffs in connection with the waste-container business.

In a long and tumultuous trial, there were frequent court outbursts, three defendants required hospitalization at some point, and a juror's car was shot up. In March 1993, Corsaro was convicted of the major racketeering charges. He was later sentenced to 26 years in prison. Corsaro appealed the verdict and in 1999 prosecutors offered him a plea bargain that reduced his sentence down to 8 to 16 years.

In 2000, Corsaro was released on parole. On July 5, 2002, Samuel Corsaro died of a heart attack in Clifton at age 59.
