= Ross Prio =

American mobster (1901–1972)

- Born: Rosario Priolo; May 5, 1901; Sicily, Italy
- Died: December 22, 1972 (aged 71); Miami, Florida, U.S.
- Occupation: Mobster
- Allegiance: Chicago Outfit

Ross Prio (born Rosario Priolo; May 5, 1901 – December 22, 1972) was an Italian-born American mobster and high-ranking member of the Chicago Outfit criminal organization from the 1930s until the early 1970s, when he died of natural causes. Prio was the Outfit boss for the North Side of Chicago.

== Early years ==
Born in Sicily, Prio was brought to the United States by his adoptive parents. The family eventually settled in Chicago. As a young man, Prio accumulated an extensive arrest record, but a court order expunged it in 1929. During the later years of Prohibition, Prio became involved in bribing politicians and police officials for the Chicago Outfit. Prio made many loans to high-ranking police officials, including at least one member of the Chicago police intelligence unit.

== Financial empire ==
Over time, Prio gained a reputation as one of the Outfit's leading torture and murder specialists. According to one account, Prio's reputation alone persuaded a plaintiff to drop a million-dollar lawsuit against a prominent Chicago politician. Prio was a suspect in several gangland slayings and bombings throughout his criminal career. Prio was a prime suspect in a series of bombings of dairy firms which competed with his own legitimate milk companies. Prio was also linked to the firm that controlled Reddi-Wip.

Prio controlled much of the vice on Chicago's North Side, including strip clubs, b-girl joints and gay bars. Prio was often spotted at Celano's Tailor Shop, an unofficial headquarters for Outfit operations, and held court there. Other frequent visitors to the shop were Murrary "The Hump" Humphreys, Gus Alex, Tony Accardo and Jackie "The Lackey" Cerone. Prio was very involved in his North Side operations and often met with lower level Outfit associates like John Gattuso, who ran many Chicago gay bars for the Outfit (and was one of the men involved in the 1983 botched attempt on Ken Eto's life) and Armando Fosco, a hitman and political fixer.

Perhaps second to Outfit boss Sam Giancana, Prio was consulted on all Outfit murder contracts. There is a single known exception, thanks to federal wiretaps. While planning a hit to take place in Florida, Jackie Cerone was heard warning mobsters to avoid Prio, who was known to be vacationing in the area at the time. The hit was cancelled at the last minute for unknown reasons, though it is likely that Prio had heard of it and vetoed any action.

Appearing before the U.S. Senate Select Committee on Improper Activities in Labor and Management during the 1950s, Prio pleaded the Fifth Amendment to the Constitution at least 90 times. He was questioned about his connections to Paul Labriola. During the hearings, Prio claimed to be strictly a businessman with many legitimate businesses. These included cheese and canned whipped topping processors, currency exchanges, office buildings, hotels, motels, nightclubs, restaurants, finance companies, vending machine outfits, attendant services for clubs and hotels and interests in oil wells, real estate and Las Vegas casinos.

In 1972, Prio died in Miami of natural causes. By the time of his death, he had reportedly amassed a fortune far greater than that of Capone.
