= John Lazia =

American mobster (1896–1934)

John Lazia, also known as Brother John (September 22, 1896 – July 10, 1934), was an American organized crime figure in Kansas City, Missouri, during Prohibition.

== Early years ==
According to his draft card for World War I, Lazia (spelled Lazio on the card, in the 1910 census, and on his tombstone) was born in New York in 1895. He dropped out of high school in the eighth grade. By 1915, Lazia was an office clerk during the day and a robber at night. In 1916, after robbing a man on the street, Lazia was confronted by a police officer. After an exchange of gunfire, the officer arrested him. Lazia was convicted of armed robbery and sentenced to 12 years in prison. However, nine months later in 1917, the lieutenant governor of Missouri paroled Lazia if he joined the US Army. Lazia ignored the parole condition and instead started working for the political machine, controlled by Tom Pendergast. Lazia, on his draft card, claimed to be the supporter of his mother and father and to have some additional difficulties. (Draft card illegible.)

== Rise to power ==
By the early 1920s, Lazia had graduated from street crime to organizing voters for the Pendergast machine and supplying bars with bootleg whiskey. His closest associate and bodyguard was Charles Carrollo. At one point when Lazia was arrested for bootlegging, Carrollo accepted the blame and a prison sentence for him.

By the late 1920s, Lazia had become the supreme gang boss in Kansas City. In 1928, Lazia was appointed head of the Northside's Democratic Club. Lazia owned a soft drink company, several upscale gambling resorts in the city, a profitable loanshark operation, and even a bail bond company.

Lazia enjoyed considerable political power within both the Kansas City Police Department and the city administration. In 1929, after failing to file a $82,000 federal tax return, Lazia was convicted of tax evasion and sentenced to one year in prison. However, thanks in part to the influence of ward boss Tom Pendergast, the government released Lazia pending appeal. Many civic reformers decried Lazia's influence and power but were unable to effect any changes.

== Personal life ==
Lazia's criminal activities translated into a comfortable and pleasant life. He and his wife lived in a luxury apartment in Kansas City. Lazia vacationed at his resort on Lake Lotawana in Western Missouri, where he maintained several speedboats. Lazia also owned several thoroughbred race horses, which he raced at tracks around the United States. Lazia was a constant presence at sporting and civic events and donated regularly to charities. Despite all of his criminal activities, Lazia was able to maintain a generally-positive public profile.

== Decline in power ==
As the 1930s began, Lazia began experiencing more competition from other gangsters. In October 1932, Lazia's men broke into the Army armory in Kansas City to obtain more guns to fight these competitors. In June 1933, a local gang leader, Vernon Miller, requested several gunmen to free a bank robber, Frank Nash, who was being transported by train through Kansas City on June 17. The plan was to ambush the law enforcement escort at Union Station in Kansas City and to free their prisoner. Lazia reportedly provided Miller with Adam "Eddie" Richetti and Charles "Pretty Boy" Floyd, a notorious bank robber. The Union Station massacre resulted in five deaths: four law enforcement officers and Nash.

The tremendous public outrage over the shootout convinced the Pendergast machine that Lazia had become a liability that needed to be eliminated. Without his political protection, Lazia was indicted for bootlegging, illegal gambling and tax evasion. Lazia eventually pleaded guilty to tax evasion and was sentenced to one year in prison.

The Pendergast politicians also started funding a competitor, the former Lazia lieutenant Michael LaCapra, to set up competing gambling dens and distribution networks for alcohol and narcotics.

On August 12, 1933, Lazia associate Charles Gargotta and other gunmen ambushed Ferris Anthon, a gunman allied with LaCapra, on a city street. However, a sheriff and his deputy coincidentally arrived during the attack and after a shootout Gargotta was captured. The guns used in the attack were eventually traced back to the armory, and Gargotta went to prison.

== Assassination ==
On July 10, 1934, at 3:00 a.m., Lazia arrived at his residence in the Park Central Hotel at 300 East Armour Boulevard after spending the night touring his nightclubs and gambling dens with his wife and Carrollo. As Lazia was exiting the car, gunmen armed with a submachine gun, and a sawed-off shotgun emerged from the bushes. Lazia pushed his wife back into the car and told Carrollo to drive off. The gunmen sprayed Lazia with bullets and left him on the sidewalk.

Lazia later died at St. Joseph's hospital in Kansas City. Speaking to his doctor before expiring, Lazia said:

Doc, what I can't understand is why anybody would do this to me? Why to me, to Johnny Lazia, who has been the friend of everybody?

Lazia's associates immediately blamed LaCapra for Lazia's murder, tried to assassinate him several times, and succeeded in August 1935 in New Paltz, New York. However, law enforcement traced some of the bullets in Lazia's body to bullets found in the Union Station massacre, which created suspicions that it was a Lazia ally who had murdered him.

== In popular culture ==
- Lazia is portrayed by Harris Yulin in the 1975 television movie The Kansas City Massacre.
- Lazia is played by Joe DiGirolamo in the 1996 film Kansas City.
- Lazia is Played by Mark Sepulveda in the 2023 film Nelly Don The Musical Movie

Business positions
Preceded by New title	Kansas City crime family Boss; 1931–1934	Succeeded by Charles Carrollo
