= Joey Pyle =

English gangster (1937–2007)

- Born: Joseph Henry Pyle; 2 November 1937; The Angel, Islington, London
- Died: 17 February 2007 (aged 69)
- Years active: 1950s–1992
- Known for: Gangland boss in London
- Spouse: Julie
- Children: 2

Joseph Henry Pyle (2 November 1937 – 17 February 2007), known as Joey Pyle or Joe Pyle, was an English gangland boss, convicted criminal, and pioneer and promoter of unlicensed boxing, who operated in London from the 1950s until his final arrest and conviction in 1992. An associate of the Krays and the Richardsons, and "one of the most feared members of the London underworld", he was known as the "London Don of Dons" by the New York Mafia. Less well known to the general public than many of his contemporaries in the underworld, Pyle was a key police target during his criminal career, but although arrested and charged many times, he was seldom convicted, unlike many of the gangland figures with whom he was associated.

== Early life ==
Joey Pyle was born on 2 November 1937 (his tombstone in Merton and Sutton Cemetery gives his date of birth as 1935) in The Angel, Islington, London, the son of Arnie and Cath Pyle, and the youngest of their three children after his brother Ted and sister Jean. The family moved to Carshalton when Pyle was a teenager, although he retained links with his friends in the East End of London. Among his friends at this age were Jack McVitie and Johnny and Jimmy Nash.

At the age of 14, Pyle, already proficient at petty thieving and shoplifting, stole £5,000 from a TA centre in Hackbridge, near his home in Carshalton. At this age he had a Saturday job at a metal factory, and he was later to meet Eddie Richardson through the latter's work in scrap metal. He sold Richardson silver ingots that another acquaintance had stolen from the railways. Pyle became a boxing instructor at Sandhurst during his National Service, and joined the army's Southern Command Team. He was kicked out of Sandhurst following his theft of a brigadier's car; rather than being court-martialled, he was put through the criminal justice system and given three months of the newly introduced short, sharp shock, a replacement for Borstal.

In his late teens, Pyle faced the choice of being a professional boxer – he paid his dues in boxing booths at travelling fairs, and contested over 20 professional fights – or a career criminal. He chose crime. Pyle's father, a thief as well as a sportsman, asked him when he was nineteen whether he wanted to be a boxer or a thief. Pyle replied, "Dad, I think I want to be a thief."

== Criminal career ==
=== Armed robbery ===
Pyle, together with his friends Peter Marshall, Peter Tilley and Tony Baldessare, undertook bank robberies, wages theft and raids on security vans, but when they moved into safe-blowing they required an expert and worked with George Medicine, one of the acknowledged leaders in the use of gelignite, which he would detonate using an everyday light socket. After coming out of prison for the Pen Club murder, however, Pyle decided that he would "[move] away from jobs across the pavement", although he said, "I was still involved in little things every now and then."

=== Extortion and protection rackets ===
Like the Krays, Pyle ran extortion and protection rackets, particularly in the pub and nightclub trade. Protection rackets at the time usually involved a gang of heavies wrecking a venue, then reappearing and assuring the owner that his place would be safe, on payment of a fee. Pyle's approach, along with the Nashes, was a little more sophisticated, simply relying on the owners' fear of his violent reputation. While the Krays held sway in London's East End, and the Richardson gang and Freddie Foreman ruled the south of London, during the 1960s Pyle and the Nashes dominated the part of London to the west of the Krays, around Islington and the West End.

After the Richardsons were jailed in 1967, the Krays, the Nashes, Foreman and Pyle came to an informal agreement after a series of meetings about splitting the proceeds from their various protection rackets (whether it was simply from their most recent ones, or from ones that were long established, was a moot point), with Ronnie Kray talking about a "federation" of gangs. As Pyle said, "It made sense to set things up so it worked like one big strong firm rather than a few little ones, otherwise people would have been running all over the place." Among those who worked for Pyle in this period was prolific armed robber Ronnie Field: "Right from the start, once I was with Joe [Pyle] I was treated very differently. I was on the firm, if you like. I was one of those chaps that people in the boozer looked over at now. Very few people of my age would chance their arm with me, not only because I already had a growing reputation for violence, but they also feared crossing anybody that had any connections to Joey Pyle whatsoever."

=== Cooney murder ===
Along with Jimmy Nash and James Read, Pyle was tried at the Old Bailey in April 1960 for the murder of Selwyn Cooney, the manager of Billy Hill's New Cabinet Club on Gerrard Street, who was shot at the Pen Club nightclub on Duval Street near Spitalfields Market after a bar brawl in the early hours of 7 February 1960. At a meeting at The Regal, the Krays' snooker club, later on the day of the murder, Ronnie Kray offered to help Pyle and the two others leave to country if they'd wanted, but they'd already decided to stay and face the music. If found guilty, Pyle knew that he would be hanged, and his first trial collapsed after jurors were intimidated, two key witnesses – Johnny Simons and his girlfriend Barbara Ibbotson – had their faces slashed, both needing 27 stitches, and the woman who originally identified Pyle at the ID parade, Fay Sadler (an ex-prostitute known as "The Black Widow"), disappeared. (Sadler was manager of the Pen Club and the girlfriend of Cooney, making him her third boyfriend who'd been murdered. She miraculously reappeared at the end of the second trial.)

On 25 April 1960, only four days into the trial, Mr Justice Gorman halted proceedings, saying, "Certain information has been brought to my notice which makes it impossible for this case to be continued for trial before this jury." After a second trial at the Old Bailey, Pyle, along with Nash and Read, was acquitted of murder, but he was given an 18-month sentence for assaulting Cooney before he was shot. When later asked who killed Cooney, Pyle would say that "Cooney must have walked past a passing bullet".

The Cooney case had wide-ranging ramifications, not only marking Pyle out as a criminal with considerable underworld connections and a man not to be trifled with, but also playing a role in the formation of the Criminal Intelligence Branch (then C11, now SO11) within Scotland Yard. The police did not want a repeat of a situation in which organised crime held sway over the British legal system due to a lack of intelligence on the side of the forces of law and order, so from that time on detectives were posted at all similar trials to gather information on the key faces present.

=== Gambling ===
When Pyle came out of prison he decided to move into the illegal gambling game, reasoning that because government plans were afoot to modify gambling's legal standing, if he had familiarity with the processes, ran appropriate premises and gained a reputation as a reliable operator, then he would be in an excellent position to take advantage of any future relaxations in the law. He spoke to Billy Hill and Waggy Whitnall, who advised him on the best way forward, and he first set up a dice table at German Harry's in Balham, then expanded to The Crown in Croydon. Soon he was "looking after" other dice clubs and more upmarket casinos, ensuring that no scams were being attempted, that chips were not bought with fake money and that any cash that was owed was paid, otherwise he and his firm would move in and sort things out. As a debt-collection enforcer, and often working alongside Johnny Nash, among the people that Pyle encouraged to cough up their money was James Bond film producer Cubby Broccoli, who owed £40,000 and whose minders Pyle had to get past first ("The funny thing is, the minders knew us and once Broccoli realised that, he knew that he had no protection at all. He paid up in full the same day").

Pyle, a keen gambler himself, tried to move into fixed greyhound racing, where several of the dogs had their food doped and were thus unable to run competitively, if at all. Having persuaded Bruce Reynolds to give him £3,000 (a fraction of the proceeds of the Great Train Robbery) for his bet, Pyle's first and last attempt at a big win on a race involving doped dogs at Wembley Greyhounds went disastrously wrong when he put his entire stake on a dog suffering from rheumatism.

Joe Nesline, a Washington gambling king pin and one of a number of Americans who crossed over to London to get involved in the casinos, asked Pyle and Nash to protect the Colony Club, a casino in Mayfair he had invested in, whose host was the actor George Raft. Pyle and Nash, and Nesline, for that matter, were unaware that Dino Cellini had asked Albert Dimes to sort out protection, and he had approached the Krays. When Pyle saw Ronnie Kray at the club, who told him he had got a good bit of business running the place and that "Me and Reg are right in here," Pyle turned to Nash and said, "Fuck me John, looks like we've got a couple of partners and we didn't even know about it." Pyle reflected: "I was a bit taken aback at first but it didn't take long to sort it all out." Further contacts – and protection arrangements – were made between other American casino owners, the Krays, the Nashes and Pyle. Not long after, Raft and Cellini were deported from Britain following government concerns about Mob involvement in West End casinos.

One of Pyle's gambling scams was to take high-rollers for week-long trips to a Joe Nesline casino in Yugoslavia, and using a number of means – crooked dice, bringing his people along to pose as gamblers, assuring the gamblers that the dealer would feed them chips – by the end of the week the high-rollers had lost everything. To make things look legitimate, there were plenty of winners at the casino among the British visitors, but they were all employed by Pyle.

=== Underworld fixer ===
Known as a diplomat and a fixer among the criminal fraternity, Pyle straddled all sides of feuding gangland London, being associated with both the Kray and the Richardson families as well as the Nashes. As The Who vocalist Roger Daltrey said, "Joey wasn't high-profile in the public's eye, but he was a mediator between the big crime families. He was the one who sat with them and sorted out the grudges ... He was good at it." Armed robber Ronnie Field said of Pyle: "Working with and for Joey Pyle was also something I valued very highly. The older I got, the more I realised what a special person he was. He spoke words of wisdom, was a diplomat and a smart businessman. Had he been born in different circumstances – in a different area at a different time – he'd have been the managing director of a company quoted on the Stock Exchange, I'm sure." John Pearson, author of the first and most critically acclaimed book on the Krays, stated that "Joe Pyle had been the closest thing to the godfather of British crime for nearly three decades."

Pyle was best man at both Ronnie Kray's first wedding and at Charlie Kray's wedding, and he often visited both of the Kray twins in prison (Ronnie latterly in Broadmoor) and Charlie Kray in Parkhurst Prison. Ronnie asked Pyle to set up his second wife, Kate Kray, with a bodyguard, and Pyle recommended Ronnie Field, who assumed the position for a number of years. Along with Freddie Foreman, Charlie Richardson and Dave Courtney, Pyle was meant to be a pallbearer at Reggie Kray's funeral, but Reggie's young wife Roberta refused to let them as she wanted Reggie to be remembered as a family man not a gangland boss, so Pyle sat outside the church in his car for the duration of the service. Pyle would later say: "Though I was never part of the Firm, never getting a pension from the Twins, I was more than pally with them . . . It was the same with me and the Richardsons and no one ever had a problem with that. Sometimes the Twins and the Richardsons would be at the same club at the same time but nothing ever sparked off while I was around." When asked why the Krays were so notorious while he and his firm were virtually unknown among the wider public, Pyle said: "Let them have as much of the limelight as they want. We’re happy in the shadows with the money."

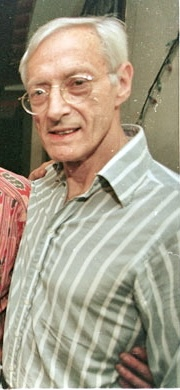
Bruce Reynolds in 1999

Bruce Reynolds, the mastermind behind the Great Train Robbery, contacted Pyle several weeks after the robbery asking for a place to hide. Despite the fact that every policeman in the country was looking for him, Pyle fixed Reynolds up at his brother's in Cobham, but the train robber was soon in touch again, complaining that "it's too fucking quiet. It's frightening the life out of me." Reynolds moved in with Pyle in Clapham South at the end of August 1963 and stayed until November that year, when he moved in to a flat in Croydon above a dry-cleaners that Pyle jointly managed. When police raided the flat after an earlier visit on an unconnected matter, Reynolds had already fled, and would remain free for another year, but Pyle's albeit tangential involvement in the then biggest robbery of the century was noted by the authorities.

Pyle was thought to have assisted in the escape from prison of his friend Jack "The Hat" McVitie and Frank Mitchell, the Mad Axeman of Broadmoor, from Dartmoor Prison, and he admitted trying to help John James Buggy, who was serving a nine-year sentence for shooting a man in Piccadilly, to escape by throwing a weighted rope over the prison wall.

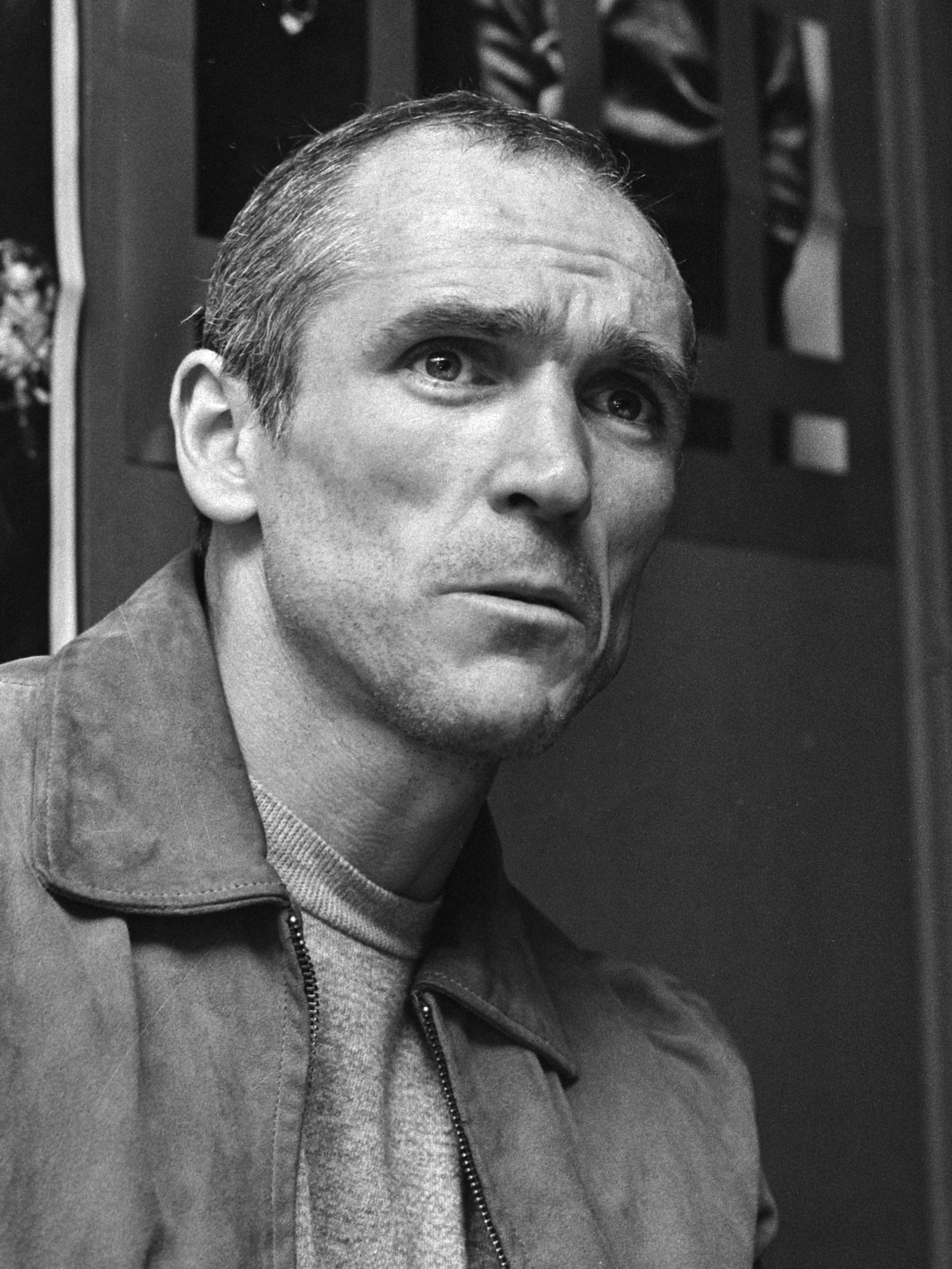
John McVicar in 1981

Pyle also assisted John McVicar in his escape from Parkhurst Prison in 1966; McVicar had attended a spurious trial with twelve other inmates at Winchester Law Courts, and they'd overcome their guards in the prison van at Bishop's Waltham on the way back to the Isle of Wight. All the other prisoners were soon re-arrested during a massive police search operation, but McVicar, still at large, contacted Pyle in London, who drove down with Peter Tilley and met him in Portsmouth. Returning up the A3 with McVicar, Pyle got as far as Dorking, where there was a police roadblock. He sped around the police but was eventually cornered in a cul-de-sac in the town. McVicar managed to jump out in time and evade capture.

Occasionally, Pyle's wide circle of acquaintances in the criminal underworld and his power within it had deadly consequences. On one occasion in 1976, Pyle was driven by Terry Marsh to the airport to fly to Monte Carlo to watch the Monzón–Valdez fight. While in Monaco he received a message saying that "Mad" Ronnie Fryer had stabbed and killed Marsh following a bust-up in Tooting. The cause of the argument had been Fryer's jealousy that Pyle had asked Marsh to drive to the airport, not him. Several weeks later, Fryer committed suicide in his Brixton Prison cell.

Pyle was charged with being an accessory after the fact in murder for his involvement in paying off Lenny Osborne, a friend of the actor and hired muscle John Bindon, after the fatal stabbing of a police informer named John Darke on 20 November 1978 at the Ranelagh Yacht Club in Fulham. Bindon was badly cut up, with knife wounds all over his body and face, and fled to Dublin for three days; Osborne, also in the fight, fled to Amsterdam, where Pyle met up with him to help Bindon, who wanted Osborne paid to stop him testifying against him. So bad were Bindon's wounds that he needed medical assistance, and on his return to Britain and treatment he was held in Brixton Prison. A wide-ranging search was mounted to find anyone who had assisted him in his escape, and Pyle was arrested, with a whole range of charges levelled against him – including stealing £1 million of travellers' cheques at Heathrow Airport and paying Osborne. When Bindon, pleading self-defence, was found not guilty of murder after his trial in November 1979, one of the charges against Pyle, who'd been held on remand for seven months, was likewise dropped, as there had been no murder to which he could have been an accessory. When he came to trial for the stolen travellers' cheques, he was fortunate that the prosecution were relying on the testimony of Mickey Francis; Francis was easily shown to be an unreliable witness by Pyle's barrister, and Pyle walked free.

==== McVitie murder ====
Jack "The Hat" McVitie had been a friend of Pyle's since childhood. Ronnie Kray told Pyle he had heard about McVitie's constant taunting of the Krays and his death threats towards them. In his customary role of gangland diplomat, Pyle contacted McVitie (whom he knew as "Mac") six times to tell him to stop ("If you carry on like this, one day you're gonna get it"). He was ignored. Not long after, following a short struggle in a flat in Hackney, Reggie stabbed McVitie first in the face, then the stomach, chest and throat. "Jack got silly. He knew he was going to get it," reflected Pyle. "At the end of the day I can't blame the Twins for what they did. If someone goes around saying they are going to kill you, then you don't have a lot of choice – you have to do them first. But Jack should never have died the way he did. He died like a fucking rat."

=== Firearm arrest and Drury case ===
Pyle was arrested in 1971 following the murder of Police Superintendent Gerald Richardson by Freddy Sewell. The Richardson murder took place when police were called to a jewellery heist in Blackpool by a South London gang, and the Flying Squad raided Pyle's house, suspecting that he might be hiding Sewell. When Pyle told them he had no idea where Sewell was and that he had nothing to do with the Blackpool robbery, he was arrested for "conspiracy with unknown persons to commit robbery on an unknown date at an unknown place", on the basis of the police "finding" a gun, pickaxe handles and ammunition in his car. Some days later, with the fact that Pyle was being framed now widely known on the street, a Sunday People journalist came to his house after he had been released on bail, asking questions about corrupt police officers. The journalist, Bill Thompson, told him about another case, in which Detective Chief Superintendent Kenneth Drury of the Flying Squad had framed a boy called Pat Murphy for a murder during a robbery at a post office in Luton.

Although Murphy was innocent of the crime, he had been grassed up by another member of his gang who had himself committed the murder but was not charged by police, and Thompson wanted to show both Murphy's innocence and Drury's corrupt practices. As Pyle was a good friend of the boy's father, Stevie Murphy, when Thompson asked if he had anything on the Flying Squad officer, Pyle told Thompson that he knew that Drury had been on holiday in Cyprus with Soho pornographer Jimmy Humphreys, whom Pyle knew well and often visited in his home, where he would sometimes bump into Drury. Subsequent investigation by the People showed that Drury's holiday had been paid for in full by Humphreys. He produced ample documentation of his relationship with Drury, who was now framing him as a police informer, making Humphreys fear for his life. In 1976, Drury, together with 13 other officers in the Flying Squad and the Obscene Publications Squad, was arrested for corruption, and in 1977 he was jailed for eight years, the other officers also being given prison terms.

Pyle, meanwhile, still had the charge of possessing a firearm hanging over him. According to Pyle, Sergeant Harry Hannigan, the Flying Squad officer who arrested him, offered to drop the charges if Pyle gave him £6,000. Pyle flatly refused, telling Hannigan to his face at Tintagel House, the Metropolitan Police Murder Squad's HQ, "I hate your fucking guts. I hate every fucking bone in your body. I hope you die of fucking cancer." When Pyle went to court, the police case rapidly fell to pieces due to the fiction of the weapons in Pyle's car and the dubious stories that had to be concocted to establish their existence. In his summing-up, the judge told the jury that if they found Pyle not guilty then they were saying that all the police officers that had given evidence were liars, perjurers and had gone completely mad. When the jury returned from their deliberations, they found Pyle not guilty. Hannigan was subsequently given a conditional discharge for attempting to bribe a Sussex detective and recommended to see a psychiatrist.

=== Narcotics bust ===
Although Pyle never took pills during the 1960s pill craze nor any other form of illegal drugs, he was charged with supplying, or agreeing to supply, a variety of narcotics. He was importing a weekly load of 200 kg (441 lb) of cannabis into the UK during the 1980s, but police attempts to have build a case against him for importing £5 million of cannabis failed when a key witness – a German ship captain – refused to testify against him.

Pyle spent two spells of time in prison on drugs-related charges. The first was when his name was used by a drug-smuggler to bolster his reputation; police arrested Pyle, along with Howard Marks, and he spent two months in Brixton Prison as an AA Category prisoner before being released on lack of evidence.

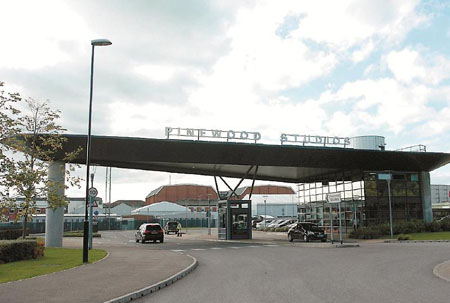
Pinewood Studios, Buckinghamshire, where Pyle ran Touchdown, a film production company

The second saw Pyle convicted for fourteen years – reduced to nine years after appeal – for offering to supply heroin and opium, for which he served a five-year sentence from 1992 to 1997. Pyle had moved into loan-sharking in the 1980s, and in 1985 a man called Richard Ledingham approached him for a £20,000 loan. Despite not knowing the man, Pyle agreed, partly because Ledingham appeared to own a vast leisure complex in Eastbourne. After receiving a couple of payments for facilitating the loan, the money owed by Ledingham dried up, and it was soon apparent that he had fled the country, owing considerable debts. On return to the UK a few years later, Ledingham met up with Pyle and repaid the debt, and all appeared good. But in 1990, Ledingham was arrested on a charge of stealing £5 million from Barclays Bank, and with the forthcoming verdict looking like it would only go one way, he told police that Pyle was looking to unload a large consignment of heroin at £28,000 per kilogram, with himself as the buyer. The police prepared a sting operation to entrap Pyle once and for all. In May 1991, Ledingham borrowed £10,000 off Pyle, and, pretending to be unable to pay him back, fixed Pyle up with a bogus buyer called "Dave", a policeman. Pyle, who was keen to get his money back, went along with the story and pretended he could get heroin for "Dave", even though he did not deal in the drug. Meanwhile an attractive young woman called "Lucy" started work at Pyle's film production company in Pinewood Studios and planted a bug in his office, which recorded 160 45-minute tapes, precisely six minutes of which related to the supply of drugs.

At this point, and quite unrelated to the police entrapment operation, a man called Pete Gillette approached Pyle via Reggie Kray and asked whether Pyle would promote his music. The man, who possessed no discernible musical talent, also asked Pyle whether he could distribute a product called Omnipom, a substance in a glass vial used, apparently, by bodybuilders and athletes, and latterly by young people in a recreational capacity. Unknown to Pyle, it contained an opiate, a Class A restricted drug. Not wanting to upset Reggie Kray by turning Gillette down, but unwilling – and unable – to do anything with him musically, Pyle thought that he could shift the supply of Omnipom through "Dave", whom he considered something of a mug. "Dave" agreed to go ahead with the Omnipom deal, on the basis that it was a tester for the real heroin deal, which Pyle, eager for the Ledingham repayment, still assured "Dave" was going ahead, even though there was no heroin. Finalising the deal in a bugged hotel room, with Pyle boasting to "Dave" that he could get the heroin, Pyle was finally paid, only to walk out into the corridor, get struck on the head by the butt of a policeman's rifle and arrested.

Pyle was tried at Southwark Crown Court in early 1992, with the jury being given 24-hour protection and an armed guard to court, on the basis of Pyle's extensive connections in the British underworld and his Mafia links. By the time the trial had begun, three out of the 12 jurors had been "approached", so Mr Justice Butler, despite being furious with this development, agreed to proceed with nine jurors, saying, "I will not be dictated to by members of the criminal fraternity." When a fourth member of the jury said she had been approached, and that she had told the other jurors, a retrial was held at the Old Bailey. Here the jury were only assigned numbers and hidden from the public gallery, so there was no chance they could be nobbled. Pyle, originally sentenced to fourteen years, was given nine years at his appeal heard at Woolwich Crown Court, and finished his sentence at Coldingley Prison as a Category C prisoner. Ronnie Field offers the following portrait of Pyle as a prisoner:

"Although Joe was the guvnor in prison, he was one of the boys too. He didn't throw his weight around and just got on with his bird. He wouldn't have it with the screws, though. If they spoke to him he'd be civil and reply, but he wasn't one for conversing with them. Truth is, they feared him. They knew that Joe may have been inside but his power on the outside was undiminished, and they wouldn't risk upsetting him."

=== Mafia connections ===
Pyle had a number of connections with the US Mafia, which was among the reasons given for the security at his 1992 trial. He had been introduced to Black Sabbath's one-time manager Wilf Pine via their mutual friend Reggie Kray, as Pyle wanted to "go straight" and move into the music business. On a trip to New York to raise funds for a forthcoming film about the twins, Pine introduced Pyle to Genovese crime family member Joe Pagano at his house, having earlier assured Pagano in generous if somewhat inaccurate Mafioso argot, given the Englishmen's parentage, that Pyle "was a good friend of ours". After Pine has introduced the two men ("Joe P., I want you to meet Joe P."), Pagano introduced Pyle to a number of other Genovese made men who were at his house at the time, including his son Danny, and said he would fix him up with Carmine "Wassel" DeNoia, a Genovese associate who was well connected in the music business. Pagano invited Pyle to become part of the family but Pyle declined, partly on account of the weather in New York City, but also because he was uneasy about Mob morality:

"I found the code of honour was a lot stronger back in London than it was over in the States. I met a lot of people over there whose attitude was that if they got pulled in by the police they would talk.'You gotta tell them something ain't you,' they would say. They couldn't get their head around the idea of going no comment."

Preferring the climate of California, Pyle left for Palm Springs, where he met Bobby Milano of the Los Angeles crime family on Pagano's recommendation, and later reputed Gambino soldier and music industry figure Joe Isgro, who, via payola, was alleged to control airplay on US radio and thereby the chances a record had of reaching the charts. Pyle hit it off with Isgro, "getting involved with little bits and pieces", and Isgro asked him if he could help provide the same service in Europe regarding airplay that he had going in the US. Pyle also knew Ori Spado, Hollywood fixer and gangster, and associate of Colombo family underboss Sonny Franzese. Spado referred to Pyle as "my best friend".

== Boxing ==
With the encouragement of his parents, both keen fans, Pyle joined the Tiverton and Preedy Athletics and Boxing Club as a boy, where world flyweight champion Terry Allen trained. After the family move to Carshalton, he trained there, and reached the quarter-finals of the All England Championships.

When he turned professional Pyle lost his first fight, but then was unbeaten in his subsequent 23 bouts. "As far as I was concerned," he said, "I was a professional boxer – that was how I was making my living, Everything else was the icing on the cake," although this self-characterisation would not last long.

=== Unlicensed fights ===
Pyle organised unlicensed fights, known as "on the cobbles", because the British Boxing Board of Control (BBBofC) would not license fights involving his friend Roy "Pretty Boy" Shaw when Shaw came out of prison, on account of Shaw's criminal record. Pyle claimed he started unlicensed fights because at 41 Shaw was "too old"; Shaw had previously been able to fight under the name Roy West but the BBBofC would not now issue Shaw a licence under any name (Pyle had managed to persuade Shaw to cooperate with the staff at Broadmoor rather than attacking them and subsequently being put on anti-psychotic drugs, which saw Shaw soon moved out of the "punishment block" and later thank Pyle for saving his life.).

Shaw's first fight was with Donny "The Bull" Adams, the King of the Gypsies. Adams had previously taken part in bare-knuckle fights in scrap metal yards and other such venues, but Pyle decided that for this fight the set-up was going to be much more upmarket as there was serious money to be made. He hired a field from a farmer in Essex, set up a ring, sold over a thousand tickets at £10 each, with the added attraction of alcohol on sale and pony trek races. But when the police got wind of the match – to be fought with no referee, no rules and no time limit – as well as of the alternative venue that had quickly been arranged to foil them, Pyle had no choice but to call it off. The two boxers were arrested for breach of the peace, but at Hereford magistrates' court the magistrate ruled that the fight could go ahead as long as gloves were worn, and there were rounds and a referee. Pyle contacted circus impresario Billy Smart, and the match for the title of "The Guv'nor" was staged at Smart's Big Top in Windsor on 1 December 1975, with Shaw knocking Adams out stone cold within seconds of the first round. Having jumped on Adams's head several times, Shaw would have carried on punching Adams until he'd killed him if not for the swift intervention of others.

Many men now wanted to have a go at taking on Shaw, so Pyle staged further matches with his fighter, on a winner-takes-all basis. The popularity of this new branch of the sport that Pyle had invented quickly grew, as large numbers of people fancied their chances in the ring, from seasoned ex-pros to inexperienced hard nuts, neither of which groups were able to get a licence from the BBBofC. Pyle was soon forced to introduce rules and regulations.

The long-awaited bout on the unlicensed scene was between Shaw and London enforcer and bouncer Lenny McLean, represented by his second-cousin Frank Warren, and they contested a famous trilogy of matches, with Shaw winning the first on 23 May 1977 after McLean conceded, and losing the second two, both held the following year.

Pyle would later briefly promote armed robber and high-profile prisoner Charles Bronson as an unlicensed fighter.

== Other interests ==
Pyle released a book of poems and other writings – Like Father Like Son: A Journey of Minds – with his son, Joe Pyle Jr. Pyle ran a film production company called Touchdown, which made a number of films, including a music video by Gary Numan and a documentary about politics in the Seychelles, filmed covertly in the country under the pretext of being a nature film. The film was a vehicle for a former president, James Mancham – at the time in exile in London – to attempt to regain power. Touchdown Films was based in Pinewood Studios, and was where "Lucy" placed the bug that helped in Pyle's conviction on the opium and heroin charge in 1992.

== Retirement ==
Towards the end of his life, Pyle began to be approached as a retired and now reformed figure who could be relied upon for his insights into the underworld. In 2003, the Guardian newspaper sought his opinion on the rise in British gun crime at the start of the 21st century ("In the old days, during the time of the Krays and the Richardsons, people didn't go around with guns on them all the time. You only got tooled up if you were out on a bit of work. That's all changed now. For a lot of people out there, having a gun is little more than a fashion accessory") and on what the "old-style gangsters'" code of conduct was around shooting women ("There's a lot of rubbish talked about those days but we only hurt our own. You only went after other villains, not what I would call civilians, particularly women. It was one of the worst things you could do. A man who went out and shot women or children, as far as we were concerned, was a nonce. No one would have any time for someone like that. And if they went to prison, they'd get a fucking good hiding").

Pyle appeared in a three-part Channel 4 reality TV show/crime hybrid called The Heist, broadcast in 2004 and featuring a group of "experts" from the criminal world, who each possessed specialist skills. Pyle was appointed overall leader of the group – comprising cat-burglar and jewellery thief Peter Scott, computer hacker Mathew Bevan, extortionist Arno Funke and Britain's former "most-wanted man", armed robber Terry Smith – which was tasked with staging various crimes: stealing a painting from the London Art Fair at the reputedly impregnable Business Design Centre in Islington, stealing a prototype TVR Sagaris sports car from the Earl's Court Motor Show, and extorting money from a Newmarket racehorse owner while holding his horse, Lucky Harry, hostage.

== Death and funeral ==
Pyle died of motor neurone disease in February 2007. Although not on the scale of the Kray funerals of previous years, more than 1,000 people attended his funeral at St Teresa's Church in Morden on 28 February 2007, including Charlie Richardson, Kate Kray, Freddie Foreman, Bruce Reynolds, Howard Marks, Jimmy White, Gary Mason and Kenny Lynch. The funeral procession down Lower Morden Lane was headed by four members of the Outlaws Motorcycle Club and all the pubs in the area were shut for the occasion. Flowers for the funeral were carried in a 32-foot articulated lorry, and over 3,000 people proceeded to Merton and Sutton Cemetery for the burial.

== Bibliography ==
- Campbell, Duncan (2019). Underworld: The Definitive History of Britain's Organised Crime. Random House.
- Connett, David (31 October 1992). "Job descriptions that hid brutal life of a criminal". The Independent.
- Daltrey, Roger (2018). My Story. Blink Publishing.
- Davidson, Earl (2005). Joey Pyle – Notorious: The Changing Face of Organised Crime. Virgin Books.
- Field, Ronnie; Knight, Martin (2024). Nefarious: The Gripping True Story of a Life in Crime with Notorious London Gangsters including Joey Pyle, the Krays and Freddie Foreman. HarperCollins.
- Gray, Mike; Currie, Tel (2008). Ronnie Biggs: The Inside Story. Apex Publishing.
- Hoare, Philip (6 November 1993). "Obituary: John Bindon". The Independent.
- Hoggart, Paul (4 December 2004). "Crime pays, but only on TV". The Times.
- Holland, Gary (5 December 2007). "Unlicensed Boxing". BBC.
- Horsnell, Michael (7 May 1996). "Covert bug exposed film executive's covert trade". The Times.
- The Independent (5 October 1992). "Film director denies drugs deal charge".
- McKay, Reg; Ferris, Paul (2005). Vendetta: Turning Your Back on Crime Can Be Deadly. Black & White Publishing.
- Pearson, John (2003). One of the Family: The Englishman and the Mafia. Arrow Books.
- Pyle Sr, Joseph; Pyle Jr, Joseph (2018). Like Father Like Son: A Journey of Minds. CreateSpace Independent Publishing Platform.
- Spado, Ori; Griffin, Dennis N. (2019). The Accidental Gangster: From Insurance Salesman to Mob Boss of Hollywood. WildBlue Press.
- Surrey Comet (15 March 2007). "Joey Pyle: A force in London underworld".
- Thompson, Tony (23 March 2003). "Women become the targets in gangland's killing spree". The Guardian.
- Thomson, Tony (5 October 2003). "Gun crime spreads 'like a cancer' across Britain". The Guardian.
- Thompson, Tony (21 November 2004). "Arch-villains pull off one last heist - stealing the limelight". The Guardian.
- Woodland, David I. (2015). Crime and Corruption at The Yard: Downfall of Scotland Yard. Pen and Sword.
