= Wilf Pine =

English music manager, record producer, gangster

- Born: 23 February 1944; Newcastle upon Tyne, England
- Died: 2 March 2018 (aged 74)
- Years active: 1960s–1990s
- Known for: Music manager, record producer, gangster
- Spouses: Jill (m. 1963; div. 1972): Leslie (divorced); Ros
- Children: 5

Wilf Pine (23 February 1944 – 2 March 2018) was an English music manager, record producer and gangster. After a difficult childhood, he was sent to an approved school in Northumberland. This was followed by a brief spell as an enforcer and hired muscle on the Isle of Wight and in London, and as an assistant to British music promoter Don Arden. He then co-managed Black Sabbath for 13 months in the early 1970s, and also managed The Groundhogs, the Edgar Broughton Band and Stray, among others. Despite developing a close relationship with Genovese crime family capo Joe Pagano, carrying out jobs for the New York Mafia in both the US and the UK, and being an intimate of the Kray twins and numerous other British underworld figures, he never spent time in prison.

== Early life ==
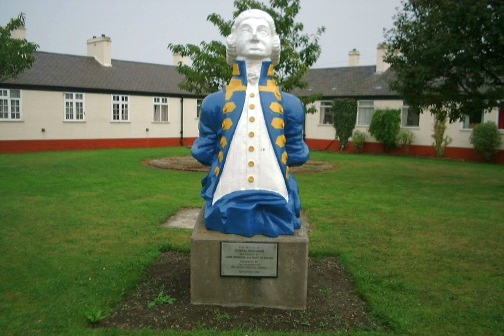
Figurehead of Admiral of the Blue Edward Boscawen at Wellesley Nautical School. Pine was among those who paid for the 10-foot statue to be installed at the school.

Pine was born on 23 February 1944 in Newcastle upon Tyne to Mildred "Millie" Pine (née Brigham) and Bernard Pine, a sailor in the Royal Navy during the war and subsequently a cinema projectionist and railwayman. Wilf, the younger brother of Bernard Jr, was born with tuberculosis of the lungs, and the illness led his mother to take him south from Newcastle to the more favourable climate of Ryde on the Isle of Wight, where her husband's family lived.

The young Pine, who also had two younger sisters, Maureen and Margaret, attended St Mary's Roman Catholic primary school in Ryde – where Wilf was frequently thrashed by a nun, Sister Paula – followed by the secondary school in the town. Both he and his brother were beaten severely by their father and were soon involved in petty crime. Following his arrest for theft at the age of 15, Wilf was sent back up north by the presiding magistrate to serve a three-year "sentence" at an approved school for young delinquents in Blyth, run on military lines. Wellesley Nautical School was brutal, with Pine being attacked upon arrival and then headbutted unconscious by a so-called "petty officer" at the establishment.

Released after two years, Pine found work at a foundry in Newcastle, followed, on his return to Ryde, by jobs as a binman for the borough council and a bouncer, as well as operating as a freelance enforcer: "Even in as sleepy a place as the Isle of Wight," he recalled, "so many people seemed to need a spot of muscle to sort out their problems." He soon turned to crime full-time, working alongside a group of Londoners hijacking lorries. In 1963, his girlfriend Jill thought that she was pregnant and, according to the mores of the time, they were obliged to get married, with Pine spending the night before the wedding in police custody following his assault of some men at a nightclub that evening. Jill subsequently discovered that she was not, in fact pregnant, although she had a son, Sean, by Pine in 1965, and a second, Scott, in 1967. Pine was fired by the council from his job as a binman for swearing at and upending the bin of a town councillor following an altercation.

For the next three years Pine used his organisational skills to run a bouncer service on the island, then alternated between the island and London, working on building sites and as a bouncer in the pubs and clubs of London's East End, fraternising with the capital's criminal underclass. He soon turned to so-called "heavy work" – carrying and using a gun – and would often pair up in London with Dave Farley, an associate and friend from the Isle of Wight, on jobs connected with gambling, which had become decriminalised in the UK following the passing of the Betting, Gaming and Lotteries Act 1963. This work could involve armed raids on small clubs at the behest of the club's owner, during which they would rob the club's patrons, as well as beating up club employees for authenticity's sake and to allay suspicion.

== Music management, promotion and production ==
=== Isle of Wight ===
Pine's entry into the music world was primarily at the behest of Clive Meddick, owner of the Disco Blue nightclub in Ryde, for whom he worked for two years. Pine was hired initially as a bouncer and general muscle at the club, and he endeared himself to Meddick by his role orchestrating the near-burial of the body of a man known as Scots Billy, who had apparently been murdered by Meddick in a fight (Scots Billy later turned out to be very much alive). When Meddick expanded his musical operation and started putting on live music nights on Saturdays at the Royal York Hotel, Pine seamlessly slipped into the role of booking acts and general management.

The first band to play was The Move, followed by Amen Corner, the Tremeloes and an early incarnation of Status Quo, and Pine soon found his allegiances had switched from heavy work to rock 'n' roll, with many of the performers becoming acquaintances and some close friends. This was not to say that Pine's propensity for violence went unused; along with members of his Isle of Wight crew, he would frequently weigh in and use a pick axe handle to attack unscrupulous promoters who had pocketed a band's earnings, and use his range of contacts to track down those who simply disappeared without paying the acts.

Pine was friends with the Shulman brothers from Portsmouth, who played in Simon Dupree and the Big Sound, a band that had enjoyed a Top Ten hit the previous year with "Kites". Pine persuaded them at Meddick's bidding to play the opening night in the Hunter's Den ballroom at the Ryde Castle Hotel in 1968, despite the band being booked to play elsewhere that night. Meddick, however, subsequently booked another band, forcing Pine to cancel; this gave him an opening to promote the band at a rearranged gig at the Seagull Ballroom in Ryde, whose lease had been taken over by promoter Peter van Buren. Van Buren suggested that Pine run follow-up Saturday-night shows at the Seagull, which is how Pine became a promoter in the music business, booking the Move, the Tremeloes, Marmalade, Amen Corner and finally Procol Harum to play over the following weeks.

=== Working for Don Arden ===
It was during this closing show of the season, while Procol Harum were playing "A Whiter Shade of Pale", that Pine was phoned at the Seagull by David Arden, the son of one of the most important figures in the British music scene, the pop group manager and promoter Don Arden, the self-styled Al Capone of pop. David told him to come and meet his father in his Denmark Street office in London the following week. Arden was having problems with a rival, simply known as "The Weasel", who was trying to muscle in on one of his acts, Amen Corner, and asked Pine, whom he knew was friends with the band members, to find out what they felt. Pine managed to steer the band into accepting Arden's continued management, which earned him Arden's gratitude, and Pine went on to work for him the following week, initially in an indeterminate role, then as the leader of a crew of his Isle of Wight heavies who would intimidate anyone trying to steal his bands; as Arden put it to them, "What we're engaged in, gentlemen, is psychological warfare, and what I want from you is the threat of violence ... Fear is all I need." Whether fear alone was used is moot: according to Black Sabbath guitarist Tony Iommi, "Wilf Pine was a nice bloke, when you knew him, but, on the other hand, he was quite vicious. Fucking hell, I've heard tasty stories of what he did for Don Arden."

The dispute with The Weasel continued awhile, and Pine sorted out a management dispute with The Move, who were also under the Arden umbrella, but his role in Arden Enterprises soon changed from bodyguard and enforcer to personal assistant and liaison man. As Pine later recalled of this time, "It was while I was working with him [Arden] that he taught me almost everything I know about the business," and the responsibilities that Arden gave this twenty-five-year-old man were considerable. He worked as European tour manager for Moby Grape and Johnny Johnson and the Bandwagon, and got to know Patrick Meehan Jr, son of Patrick Meehan, who had left Arden Enterprises to form his own production and management company. Pine was also responsible for forming a teenybopper supergroup, Judas Jump, out of the ashes of the now-defunct Amen Corner, along with members of The Herd and The Mindbenders.

After allowing himself to be roped in for "a piece of work" with Dave Farley, Pine returned to the Isle of Wight, where he was offered the lease on a club called The Music Box, with the idea that he would run Saturday-night shows there. Pine decided to accept the offer and leave the Arden organisation.

=== Black Sabbath ===
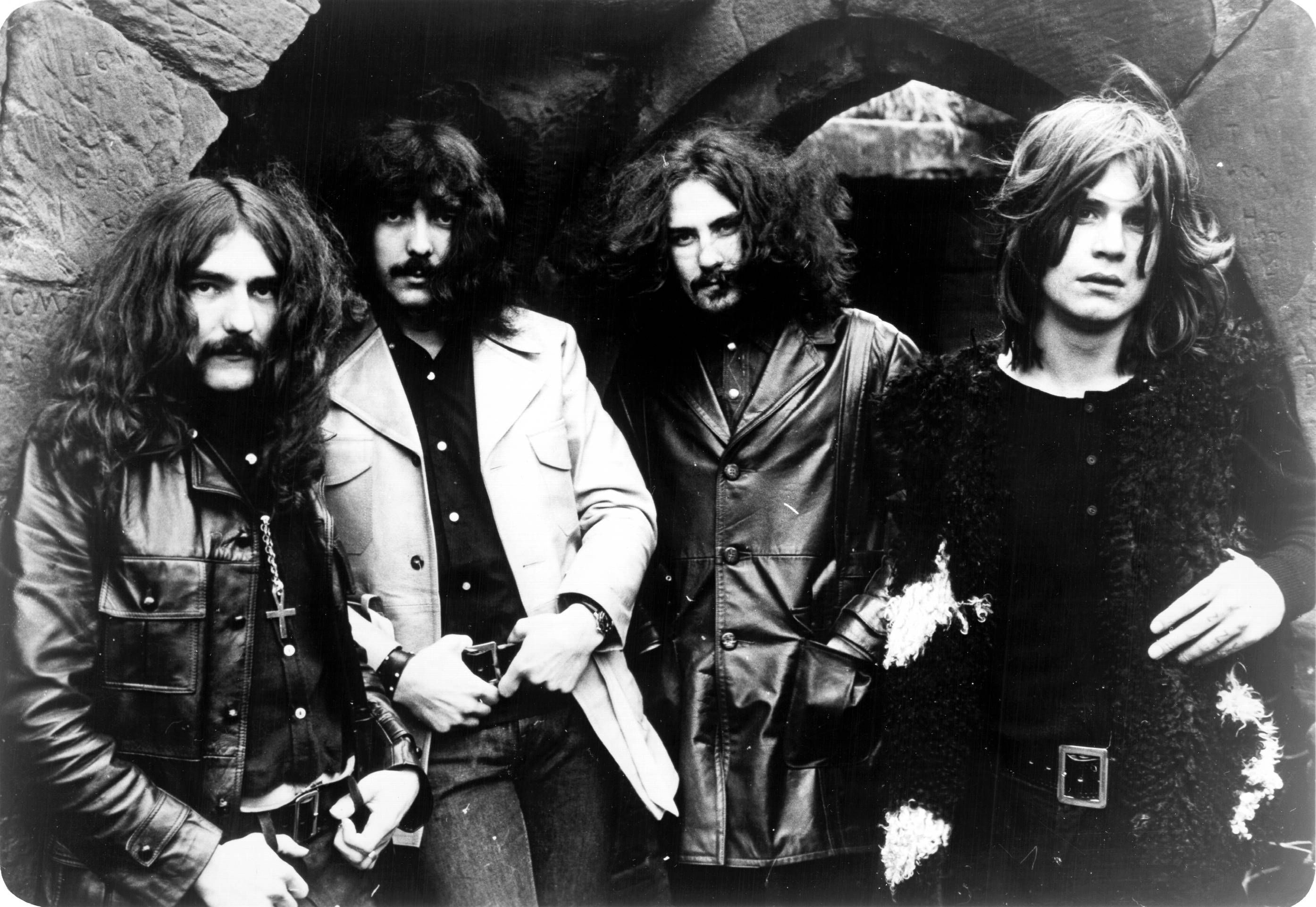
Black Sabbath in 1970

One of the first acts that Pine booked for The Music Box was "occult rock" outfit Black Widow, managed by Patrick Meehan Sr. After the successful show, Meehan suggested that Pine manage Black Sabbath, who were currently looked after by Birmingham-based Jim Simpson but were trying to expand their horizons beyond the West Midlands and had earlier in 1970 approached Don Arden at a Marquee Club gig to become their manager. After a chat with Arden, Ozzy Osbourne said that he would be in touch, but he never got back as he thought that Arden was laughing about the band during the gig. Now Patrick Meehan Jr urged Pine to manage the band, but at this stage all Pine did was book them in to play at The Music Box, after which Pine said, "It overwhelmed me. It was magnificent."

Pine was soon on the train to Birmingham, however. According to Geezer Butler, the Sabbath bassist, he told them that he had left Don Arden: "Later, we found out that Wilf and Arnie, another of Don's heavies, had been hit men for the Kray twins, the notorious East London villains. That explains why Don couldn't really do anything about Wilf and Patrick poaching us from under his nose." Following a conversation with the four members of the band, Pine became their new manager, alongside Patrick Meehan Jr (and his outfit Worldwide Artistes Management), with the pair sharing 20 per cent of the band's earnings.

After settling a legal dispute with Sabbath's former manager Jim Simpson in court, as well as a few easily fixed teething difficulties with Essex Music and some rather harder-to-fix ones with Olav Wyper, who ran their label Vertigo Records, Pine and Meehan were at the helm for the release of Sabbath's second LP Paranoid and the Top Ten single of the same name. Pine went on tour in England, Germany and Belgium with the band to honour a series of bookings that had previously been arranged by Simpson, with Pine rooming with Tony Iommi. Iommi later recalled that Pine would always travel with a case containing a hammer, with which he would kneecap anyone who did not pay the band what they were owed.

Back in England, Pine arranged for the band to appear on Top of the Pops to play "Paranoid", which reached Number 4 in the UK charts, and then to play at the Royal Festival Hall, before jetting off for a tour that broke the group in the USA. Even before Sabbath had played their first gig in New York, Pine had to retreat to bed following the side-effects of the yellow fever vaccination they had all had before entering the country; Ozzy Osbourne put around fifteen quarters into Pine's vibrating bed where he was sweating it out with feverish symptoms, which succeeded in dislocating Pine's arm. Pine left the tour the following day, although he had managed to see his Mafia contacts before becoming ill.

After thirteen months managing the band and enjoying the fruits of their success – including an apartment in West Hill, Wandsworth and an Aston Martin DB5 – Pine decided to quit managing Sabbath, partly because he did not think co-management worked, partly because Patrick Meehan was the business brains of the two of them and he had little to do. He did, however, agree to continue working for Meehan's Worldwide Artistes Management as a paid associate. Black Sabbath marked a turning point in Pine's life; as he later said, "If it hadn't been for Sabbath, I'd have ended up with a twenty-five-year stretch inside, like my friend Charlie Richardson."

=== Other artists ===
The first band that Pine acquired for the Worldwide Artistes Management roster was Gentle Giant, formed by Pine's friends the Shulman brothers from Simon Dupree and the Big Sound. The band did not have a management agreement with anyone else at the time, so on this occasion Pine did not have to steal them, but the second band he signed, The Groundhogs, who appeared on the same bill as Gentle Giant at the Queen Elizabeth Hall, most certainly did. Pine was greatly impressed by the band that night on the South Bank, and they were equally impressed by him a few weeks later when he sufficiently intimidated John McVie and a number of Fleetwood Mac roadies to get The Groundhogs moved up from third on the bill to second, taking the stage just before Black Sabbath. With his reputation as a no-nonsense character who sorted out his bands' problems with a mixture of hard work and violence, Pine had little problem acquiring up-and-coming outfits who wanted to benefit from their association with the former Sabbath manager, the next groups he signed for Meehan being the Edgar Broughton Band and Stray.

At this point Worldwide Artistes Management were bought by Hemdale Leisure Corporation, and Pine was offered his own company, which Meehan told him would be called the Gladglen Group, with offices in Mayfair and Pine as managing director. Pine could keep his four groups – Gentle Giant, Groundhogs, the Edgar Broughton Band and Stray – and would still work for Meehan. Pine now decided to move into music production, taking Stray into Olympic Studios in Barnes despite knowing nothing about musical arrangement or production, and without the say-so of Stray's label, Transatlantic Records. The end result was the 1973 album Mudanzas, which went gold on release, with Pine on production duties alongside Andrew Powell, who arranged the music, and Alan O'Duffy as sound engineer. Despite the success of the record, Pine felt that the band's relationship with Transatlantic was not working, so for their next record he signed both Stray, as well as soul singer Jimmy Helms, up with Pye Records. Helms, whom Pine had discovered when he was playing flugelhorn on Mudanzas, had gone on under Pine's management to reach Number 8 in the UK charts with the aptly titled "Gonna Make You an Offer You Can't Refuse".

== Mafia connections ==
During the 1970s and beyond, Pine knew and conducted business with middle- and high-ranking figures within the Genovese and Gambino crime families of the New York Mafia. His introduction to the Mafia came in 1973 from Irwin "The Fat Man" Schiff. Pine was working at a music studio in Connecticut and Schiff wanted him to produce music by a singer called Jimmy Price, the stage name of Jimmy Pagano, the youngest son of Genovese capo Joe Pagano. Pine was instructed by Schiff prior to meeting Pagano that he was not to let him know that he knew the identity of his son, as Joe Pagano disapproved of Jimmy's musical ambitions and wanted him to assume a role within the Genovese crew. Schiff also wanted to buy Worldwide Artistes Management from Patrick Meehan, with Pagano, who knew that Schiff had some influential and dangerous backers, urging Pine on from the sidelines. Pine, who strongly disliked Schiff, proposed the "silly figure" of £6 million just to get him off his back, never thinking that Schiff would take him seriously. Negotiations reached a fairly advanced stage, with Schiff's backer turning out to be Genovese capo "Jimmy Nap" Napoli, who was interested in using Worldwide's connection to leisure giant Hemdale to move into the gambling scene in London. But when Hemdale removed their public listing from the stock market, the deal fell through.

Pagano's son Jimmy committed suicide not long after Pine met him, and his elder son Danny was serving an eight-year prison sentence, so he and Pine, who had no family life of his own and hated his father, who died in 1973, soon developed a strong father–son relationship. Pine would regularly fly over from London to New York to meet up with Pagano, and later, when illness meant he could not make the transatlantic trip, stayed in touch through almost daily telephone calls. Their relationship was sealed when Pagano asked Pine what he felt about the murder of his brother Pasquale "Pat" Pagano the previous evening. "Give me a pistol, Joe," Pine replied, "and I'll come with you," a response that provoked Pagano to tell Pine, "From now on you're one of the family."

Pine thereby became what is termed an "associate" within the Mafia, possibly the first Englishman in such a role. Pagano devoted much time to introducing Pine to senior New York mafiosi – Genovese mobsters Anthony "Fat Tony" Salerno, Vincent Mauro, Dominick "Quiet Dom" Cirillo, Carmine "Wassell" de Noia and Louis Pacella, and John Gotti, Alfonse Sisca and Arnold Squitieri from the Gambino crime family.

From time to time Pagano would ask him for help with mob business in the US; Pine would deliver letters and packages, sometimes in an attempt to avoid potential RICO issues, to such figures as Alfonse "Funzi" Tieri, the Genovese front boss, Angelo Bruno, boss of the Philadelphia crime family, and a high-ranking capo in the Patriarca crime family on behalf of Tieri himself. Pine also attended to Mafia business in London, starting with his successful retrieval of £50,000 that a London fraudster had stolen from Bonanno associate Gus Minicci. Pine severely beat the fraudster up in a Knightsbridge flat, got the money and returned it to Minicci in New York, refusing any payment for his troubles. "Over the next decade," said Pine, "I was often asked to sort out similar small problems for Joe's friends. From then on I became their man in London."

=== Wedding to Leslie ===
Pine had divorced his first wife Jill in late 1972, losing custody of both his sons in 1973, and started living with a woman called Leslie, renting a house in Wimbledon overlooking the All England Club. Joe Pagano was best man at Pine's wedding to an actress named Leslie, which Pagano had persuaded Pine to go through with in the US; Pagano's wife Theresa was maid of honour and his two daughters were bridesmaids. Pine had cold feet on the eve of the wedding (Pagano: "You can always divorce her the next day"). Pagano was supposed to foot the bill for the wedding at the Motel on the Mountain in Upstate New York and refused to settle, but the motel manager chose not to take the matter to court. After Pine split up with Leslie, she had a relationship with Strictly Come Dancing ballroom dancer Len Goodman, with whom she had a son.

== Post-management life ==
In 1976, Pine's life started to unravel, beginning with the breakdown of his marriage to Leslie. He began to drink much more heavily than usual, and left the music business, which he claimed he "really detested." He still regularly visited the USA, on one occasion preventing Joe Pagano from getting his hitman Johnny H to kill Don Arden in an Upper East Side café after Arden had earlier called Pagano a "faggot". Pine took Arden along to the venue, Café Seventy-Two, to attempt to smooth things over between the two men. The 11 a.m. meeting initially didn't go well and as Pine recalled, "I've been around situations all my life and I know when someone's going to get killed. I also knew that Johnny H wasn't there for window-dressing, especially at that time of the morning." In the end, Arden fulsomely apologised, and over time he and Pagano "became inseparable".

In 1978, Pine was charged with the grievous bodily harm of a notorious Isle of Wight hard man, Ronnie Morris, with whom he had got into a knife fight that left both of them badly wounded. Pine's hands were seriously cut up, his right thumb nearly severed, from, he claimed, attempting to wrench the knife from Morris's grip, a story believed by the jury at Winchester Assizes. Pine was defended in court by John Smyth QC, who would later become notorious for sadomasochistic child abuse. After a short trial, Pine was found not guilty on two charges of malicious wounding with intent and grievous bodily harm.

=== Relationship with the Krays ===
Pine had a relationship with all three of the Kray brothers, having worked for the twins as an enforcer in the 1960s. He was best friends with and business manager of Ronnie Kray, whom he would regularly visit in Broadmoor Hospital, and Ronnie's book My Story is dedicated to Pine. He was also friends with Reggie, at whose funeral he was a pallbearer. He was close to Charlie Kray as well, letting him stay in his flat and visiting him nearly every day in prison at a time when he was Britain's oldest maximum security prisoner. He was with him when he died and was a principal mourner at his funeral. Pine was responsible for putting a deal together between the brothers and Parkway Films for a feature film about the twins; this was released in 1990 as The Krays, starring real-life brothers Gary and Martin Kemp. Pine was also extensively interviewed in the 2016 documentary The Krays: The Prison Years, directed by Matt Blyth.

== Death ==
Pine died on 2 March 2018 and his funeral was held on 19 March at St Mary Magdalene Church in New Milton, Hampshire, with an assortment of music, TV and underworld figures in attendance, including Billy Murray, Terry Stone, Dave Courtney, Fred Dinenage and Elkie Brooks, who sang "Don't Cry Out Loud". Pine is buried in Milford Road Cemetery, New Milton.

== Bibliography ==
- Butler, Geezer (2023). Into the Void: From Birth to Black Sabbath and Beyond. HarperCollins.
- Daly, Michael (19 October 1987). "The Life and High Times of Irwin Schiff". New York Magazine.
- Davidson, Earl (2005). Joey Pyle – Notorious: The Changing Face of Organised Crime. Virgin Books.
- Field, C. P. J. "Wilf Pine 23/02/1944 – 02/03/2018". cpjfield.co.uk.
- Goodman, Len (2008). Better Late Than Never: From Barrow Boy to Ballroom. Ebury Press.
- Hughes, Rob (25 February 2025). "The heroes and villains of the Black Sabbath journey". Classic Rock.
- Hutchinson, Lisa (27 February 2013). "Mafia man Wilf Pine's cash surprise". Chronicle Live.
- Iommi, Tony (2012). Iron Man. Simon & Schuster. ISBN 978-1-4711-1243-0.
- "News". University of Essex. 10 September 2015.
- "Obituaries - Wilf Pine's life celebrated". Isle of Wight County Press. 30 March 2018.
- Pearson, John (2003). One of the Family: The Englishman and the Mafia. Arrow Books.
- Pearson, John (2011). Notorious: The Immortal Legend of the Kray Twins. Arrow Books.
