= Arno Funke =

German extortionist

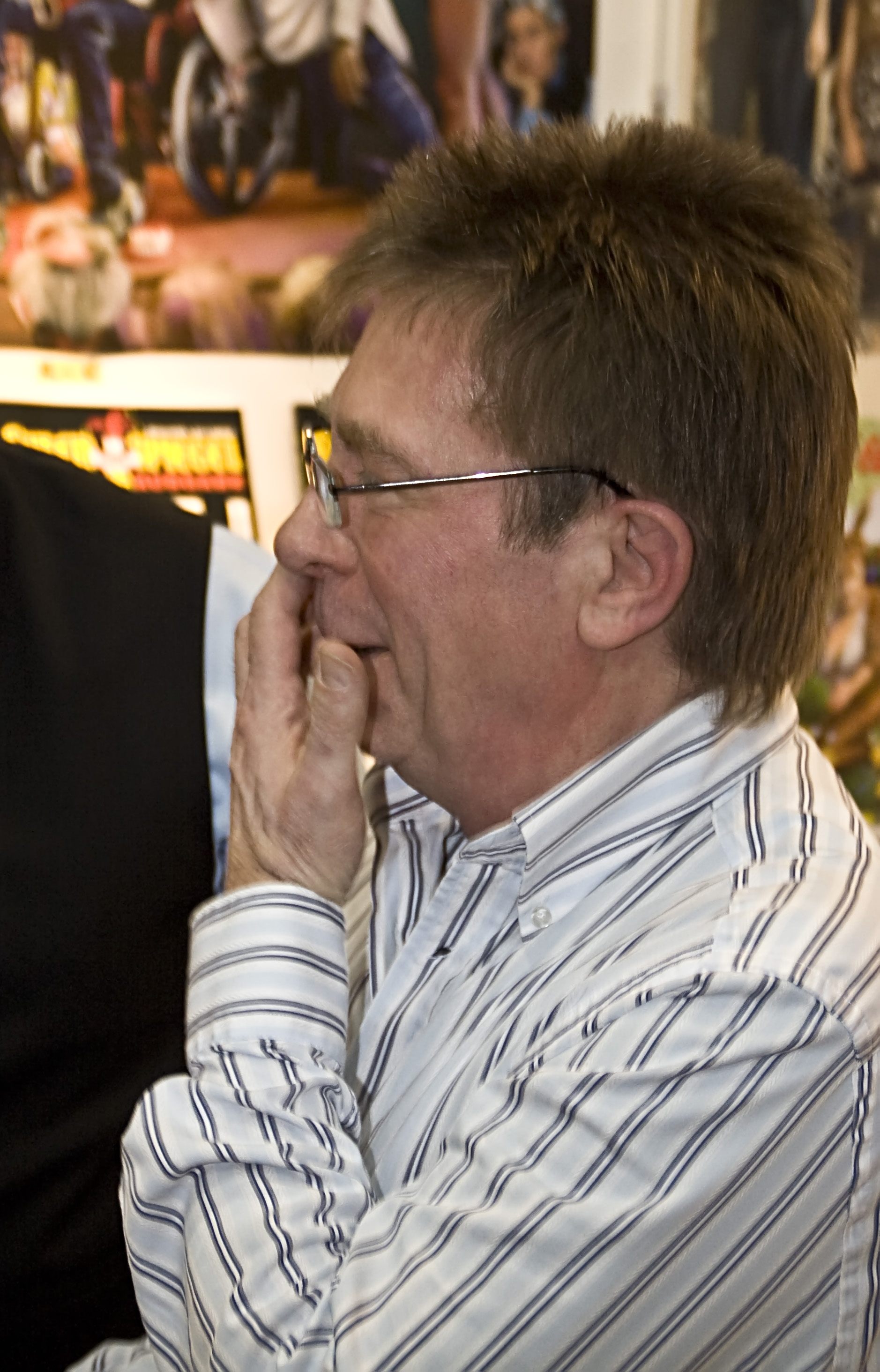
Funke at the Leipzig Book Fair in 2009

Arno Funke (born 14 March 1950), alias Dagobert, is a German author, former bomber and extortionist.

== Life ==
An automotive and sign painter by trade, Funke was later medically examined at trial and said to have minor brain damage likely from the fumes from his workspace. He began his criminal career in 1988 when he found himself needing a small amount of money to kickstart a new career as a sausage-vendor on Germany's streets.

== Extortions ==
Funke planted a small bomb in a KaDeWe department store in West Berlin, and phoned from East Berlin. At the time, East Berlin's infrastructure and police services were often not integrated with their Western equivalents. He successfully extorted 500,000 DM. Having spent the money, Funke returned to extortion in 1992. This time he chose Karstadt, Germany's largest department store. On 13 June, a bomb detonated in a shop in Hamburg. Funke set up a complex money transfer scheme, with a box attached magnetically to a train. In August, he escaped with the box, but it contained only a few hundred marks, otherwise being filled with scraps of paper. He continued to target Karstadt stores through 1993 and 1994, but did not obtain any further money. One of his bombs did $4.5 million in damage in the sporting section of Karstadt in Bremen.

For six years, the extortionist who had started calling himself Dagobert after the German name for Scrooge McDuck, baffled police and entertained the general public. Due to his careful precision and effort to eliminate any chance of anybody being hurt in his attacks, he was seen as a harmless prankster by many, and "I am Dagobert" T-shirt sales were brisk at kiosks throughout the city. When police released a tape of his voice in an attempt to trace him, a music group mixed it into a rap song dedicated to "Dagobert", during his later trial he would explain that he wanted to be like the Disney character and "swim in money".

To collect his blackmail payments, he would devise intricate mechanical devices that would speed along railroad tracks, have false bottoms and he continued to elude detection, though he barely eluded capture at the last minute several times, including once when a pursuing detective slipped on wet leaves and fell.

== End of criminal career ==
He was finally caught on 22 April 1994, and sentenced to 7 years and 9 months imprisonment; the sentence was later increased to 9 years imprisonment on appeal. It was estimated that the police had spent nearly $20 million on his pursuit.

He was released on parole after serving 6 years and 4 months on 15 August 2000. The expected media frenzy caused authorities to actually release him a day early to avoid the crowds.

== Life afterwards ==
He wrote a book in prison about his exploits and has held a job since 1998 as a cartoonist at a publishing house under a work-release program. In 2004 a British television studio created a special entitled The Heist which saw Funke teamed with Peter Scott, Mathew Bevan, Joey Pyle and Terry Smith (All celebrated criminals in different fields of expertise) in an attempt to "steal" a painting from the London Art Fair, steal a TVR Sagaris prototype and hold hostage a prize-winning racehorse whilst attempting to extort a ransom of the horse owner. In 2013 he was in the TV "Jungle Camp", the German version of I'm a Celebrity...Get Me Out of Here!

== Books ==
- Mein Leben als Dagobert. Die Bekenntnisse des Kaufhauserpressers, Ch. Links, Berlin 1998, ISBN 3-86153-164-X

== Documentaries ==
- Sven Ihden, Roland May: Die großen Kriminalfälle: „Dagobert“ – Der Kaufhauserpresser. In: Das Erste, SWR. 8. October 2007.
- Räuber und Gendarm – der Fall „Dagobert“, In: Spiegel Geschichte. 2012.
- Tim Evers: Jagd auf Dagobert in ARD-Mediathek, 2022.

== Radio Play ==
- In 2026 BBC Radio 4 broadcast a Radio Play dramatizing the investigation into bombing/extortion campaign entitled "The Scrooges Identity" https://www.bbc.co.uk/programmes/m002tbkx#:~:text=The%20Scrooge%20Identity-,Drama%20on%204,Casting%20Manager:%20Alex%20Curran
