= HMS Cornwall (1812) =

Vengeur-class ship of the line

- Cornwall

History

United Kingdom
- Name: Cornwall
- Namesake: Cornwall
- Ordered: 13 July 1807
- Builder: Frances Barnard, Deptford
- Laid down: February 1808
- Launched: 16 January 1812
- Renamed: Wellesley, 18 June 1868
- Fate: Broken up, 1875

General characteristics
- Class & type: Vengeur-class ship of the line
- Tons burthen: 1,751 25/94 bm
- Length: 176 ft (54 m) (gundeck)
- Beam: 47 ft 6 in (14.48 m)
- Draught: 17 feet 10 inches (5.4 m) at deep load
- Depth of hold: 21 ft (6.4 m)
- Sail plan: Full-rigged ship
- Armament: 74 guns: Gundeck: 28 × 32 pdr guns; Upper gundeck: 28 × 18 pdr guns; Quarterdeck: 4 × 12 pdr guns, 10 × 32 pdr carronades; Forecastle: 2 × 12 pdr guns, 2 × 32 pdr carronades

HMS Cornwall was a 74-gun third-rate Vengeur-class ship of the line built for the Royal Navy in the 1810s. She spent most of her service in reserve and was converted into a reformatory and a school ship in her later years. The ship was broken up in 1875.

== Description ==
Cornwall had a length at the gundeck of 176 feet (53.6 m) and 145 feet 1 inch (44.2 m) at the keel. She had a beam of 47 feet 8 inches (14.5 m), a draught of 17 feet 10 inches (5.4 m) at deep load and a depth of hold of 21 feet (6.4 m). The ship's tonnage was 1,751 25/94 tons burthen. Her armament consisted of twenty-eight 32-pounder guns on the lower gundeck and twenty-eight 18-pounder guns on the upper deck. On the quarterdeck were four 12-pounder guns and ten 32-pounder carronades; the forecastle mounted two of each. After the end of the Napoleonic Wars in 1815, a pair of lower-deck guns were replaced by 68-pounder carronades and a pair of upper deck guns were superseded by 18-pounder carronades. The ship had a crew of 590 officers and ratings.

After she was razeed to a 50-gun fourth rate ship in 1830, her armament became twenty-eight 32-pounders on the lower gundeck, sixteen lighter 32-pounders on the upper deck and four more 32-pounders on the forecastle. Her crew was consequently reduced to 450 men.

== Construction and career ==
Cornwall was the third ship in the Royal Navy to be named after the eponymous county. The ship was ordered on 30 May 1809 and contracted out to Mrs. Frances Bernard at Deptford. She was laid down in March 1809 and was launched on 16 January 1812. Cornwall served in the English Channel in the Napoleonic Wars.

In 1859 she was loaned to the London Association for use as a juvenile reformatory school. On 18 June 1868 she exchanged names with Wellesley and moved to the Tyne to serve as The Tyne Industrial Training Ship of Wellesley Nautical School. The actress and theatrical manager Lena Ashwell was born aboard her in 1872. Her role as a training ship replaced by HMS Boscawen (1844), also renamed Wellesley, in 1873. She was broken up at Sheerness in 1875.
