= Lew Yates =

British boxer

Personal information
- Nationality: British
- Born: 3rd June 1943; Sutton, St Helens, England
- Died: 19th May 2025; Cambridgeshire

Sport
- Country: (United Kingdom)
- Sport: Boxing

Lew Yates (born 3 June 1943 in Sutton, St Helens) also known as Wild Thing, was a boxer, doorman, bare knuckle and unlicensed fighter and all-round hardman, associated with the fighting and criminal fraternity.

== Early life ==
Yates was born 3 June 1943 in Sutton, St Helens. As an [amateur boxer] he trained under George Gilbody Snr. and Herbie Golding. Yates once fought British boxer, Billy Aird, who was the [European Heavyweight Championship|European heavyweight champion], but Yates was disqualified for head-butting Billy. In response, he threw the referee across the ring, earning a ban from boxing.

== Life ==
Yates has had a long career as one of the south of England's best and most feared doormen. Yates ran doors on clubs like Room at the top (Ilford) and Stringfellows (Covent Garden). Yates has made acquaintances with several infamous fighters such as Lenny McLean, Cliff Fields, drug dealer Mickey Green, great train robber, Charlie Wilson, among others.

== Wild Thing vs Prettyboy ==
Yates heard a BBC Radio interview with the then governor of the unlicensed fighting world, Roy "prettyboy" Shaw. Shaw challenged anyone in England to fight him. Yates intended to take the title from Shaw and, thus, moved to London. For the next 5 years Yates challenged Roy but Shaw's handlers did not agree to this until 1981. Yates had to raise a stake of £10,000 for the fight. He only got a few weeks to train. On the night of the fight Yates overpowered Shaw in the 2nd round. The round was ended with 1 min 12 seconds of the round left. By the end of the 3rd round Shaw appeared. The referee declared the fight in Shaw's favour, claiming that Yates' eye was too badly cut so the fight had to be terminated. Yates' fans suggest that the referee's statement was inaccurate as Yates' eye was not even bleeding. They claim that, on the night of the fight, there were at least three cameramen filming the contest yet not one copy of the fight has been found to date.

== Later life ==
In 2007 Yates released his book Wild Thing: The True Story of Britain's Rightful Guv'nor, written by Lew Yates and bestselling author, Bernard O'Mahoney. It was published by Mainstream Publishing.

Yates lived in Ely, Cambridgeshire where he was a boxing and personal trainer.
