= Wellesley Nautical School =

Naval training school, 1868–1933, and later approved school, Sunderland, UK

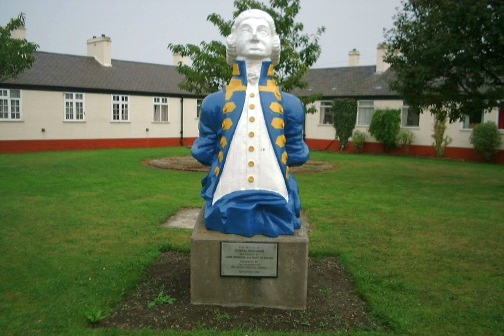
- The figurehead from HMS Boscawan became an iconic rallying point for the land-based Wellesley Nautical School at Blyth

Location
- Northumberland, England, UK
- 55.120°N 1.496°W grid reference NZ322807

The Wellesley Nautical School was a naval training school first located on the Tyne, and later removed to Blyth. It became an approved school in 1933 and finally a community home run by Sunderland Council until it closed in 2006.

== History ==
In 1868 a group of philanthropic businessmen on Tyneside under the leadership of a ship owner James Hall planned to set up a training ship. Hall was worried about declining numbers of British seamen aboard the nation’s merchant ships, and as a social reformer he was also concerned about the links between poverty and crime. Hall purchased from the Admiralty, the 74-gun third rate ship of the line HMS Cornwall that had been serving as a training ship on the River Thames. Now anchored on the River Tyne it was renamed T.T.S. Wellesley. After five years it was replaced by the larger third rate, HMS Boscawen, and moored on the Tyne at North Shields and again renamed T.T.S. Wellesley. By the early 1900s Wellesley was accepting boys from London, Manchester and Liverpool as well as from Tyneside and Yorkshire. In 1906 Wellesley sent 69 boys to sea in British merchant ships and 2 boys to foreign vessels.

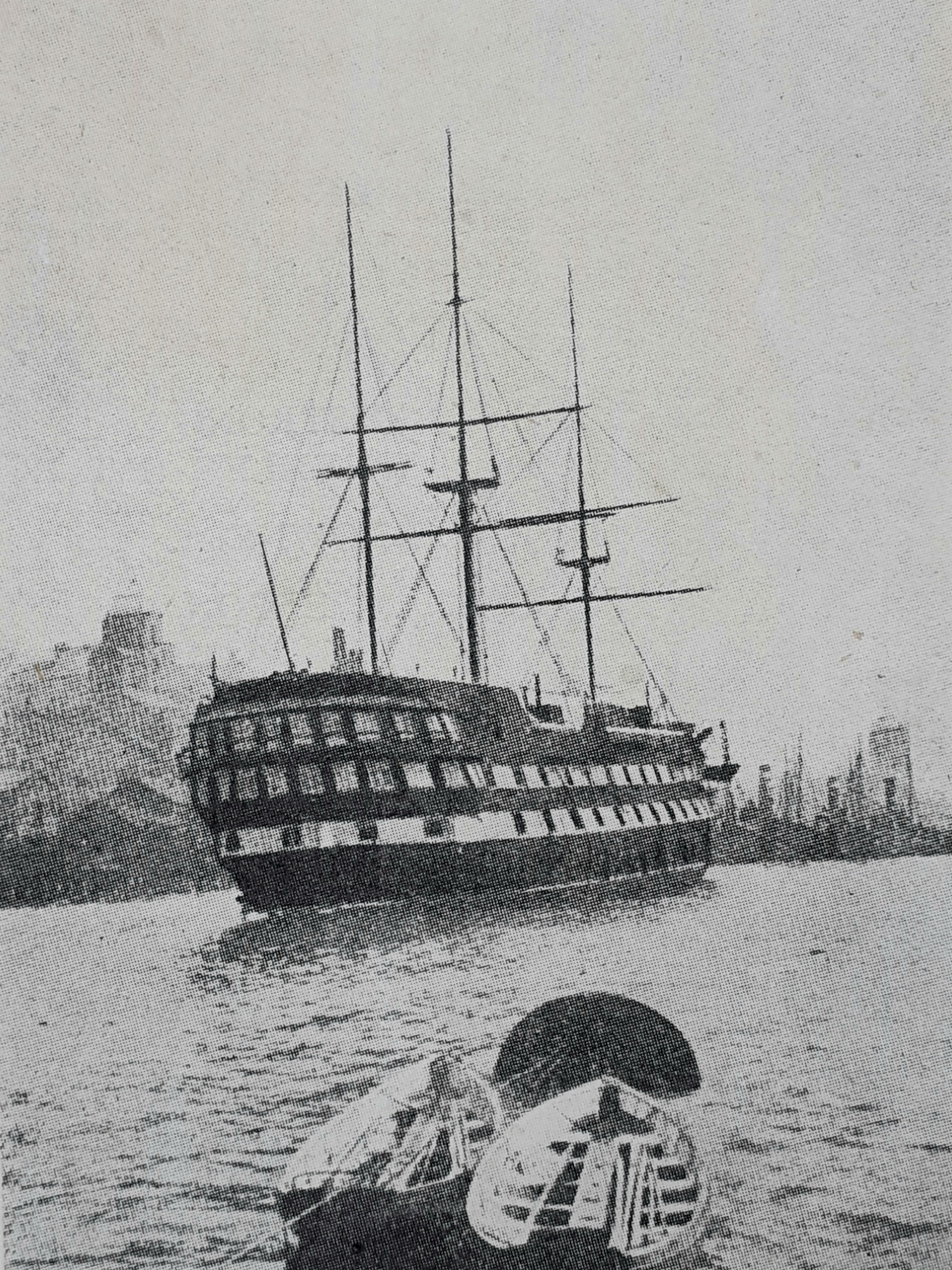
TTS Wellesley prior to the 1914 fire

Captain P. de Winton Kitcat, R.N. was head of the school from 1910-1931. A major change occurred when the training ship was destroyed by fire on 11 March 1914. All boys and staff were brought ashore safely, and temporary accommodation was provided in nearby Tynemouth Palace (later Tynemouth Plaza). During the First World War the boys were trained to produce grommets for shells in the Royal Navy and many of the officers and staff would serve in H. M. Forces - a roll of honour commemorates those were killed whilst serving. Following the war it was decided to make the training school land-based. A special public appeal raised £22,000 which allowed the school to take over the naval barracks on Links Road at Blyth, Northumberland that had served the submarine base in the First World War. The boys moved to Blyth on 18 May 1920.

Although shore-based the Wellesley continued to train lads for sea and vessels for this purpose were provided. In 1922 a 25 ton ketch 'Corina' was presented to the school for practical seamanship instruction. Cutters, whalers and dinghies provided small craft training. Trades associated with shipboard activities such as tailoring, carpentry, plumbing, cookery and first aid were included in the early curriculum. The funding of the school was very much dependent on charitable public subscription but following the Children and Young Persons Act of 1933 the Wellesley school was designated an approved school and significant funding was provided by the Treasury and Public Assistanace Authorities. The majority of boys were sent to the Wellesley by magistrates but the school retained the right to take in abandoned children and voluntarily attendees.

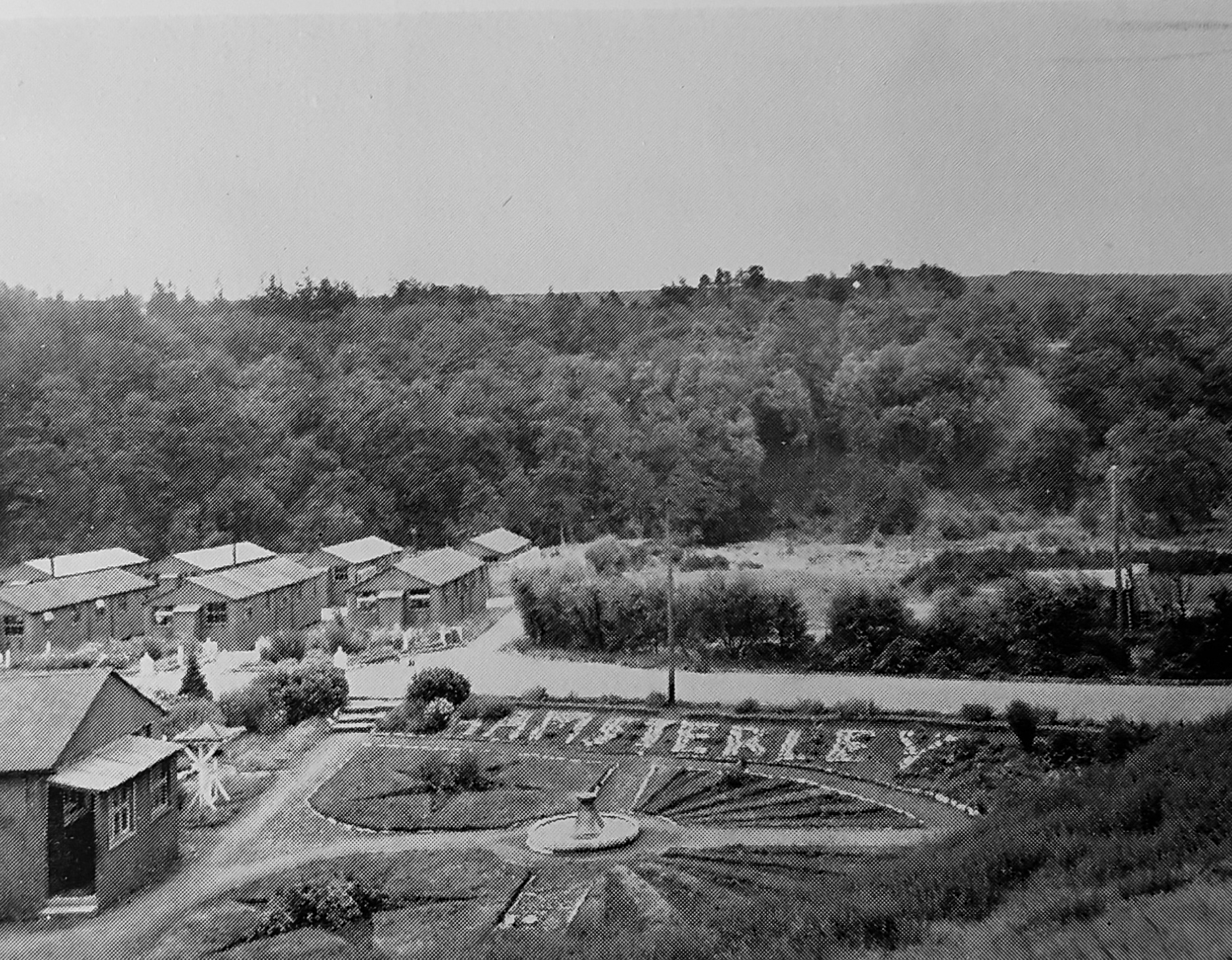
Hamsterley Forest camp as seen from the air at the beginning of the Second World War

As the school transitioned to an approved school under Commander Frank Stone, R.N. (in post from 1931 - 1949), it maintained the Wellesley's strong nautical ethos. The focus continued to be on training rather than punishment. Strict discipline was in place, but it was less tough than a borstal - a more enclosed kind of youth prison. The boys wore naval uniforms, worked to strictly managed timetables ensuring that they were kept busy and under close supervision by the staff. Until 1939 the school had remained in the buildings that had been constructed as a temporary naval base, but in August they were evacuated to Hamsterley Forest in County Durham as the Blyth site was re-occupied by the Royal Navy. Once again, a number of officers and boys served in the conflict and a Roll of Honour would be placed in the school's chapel marking those who were killed while serving. The school returned to their 'temporary' accommodation at Blyth in 1946.

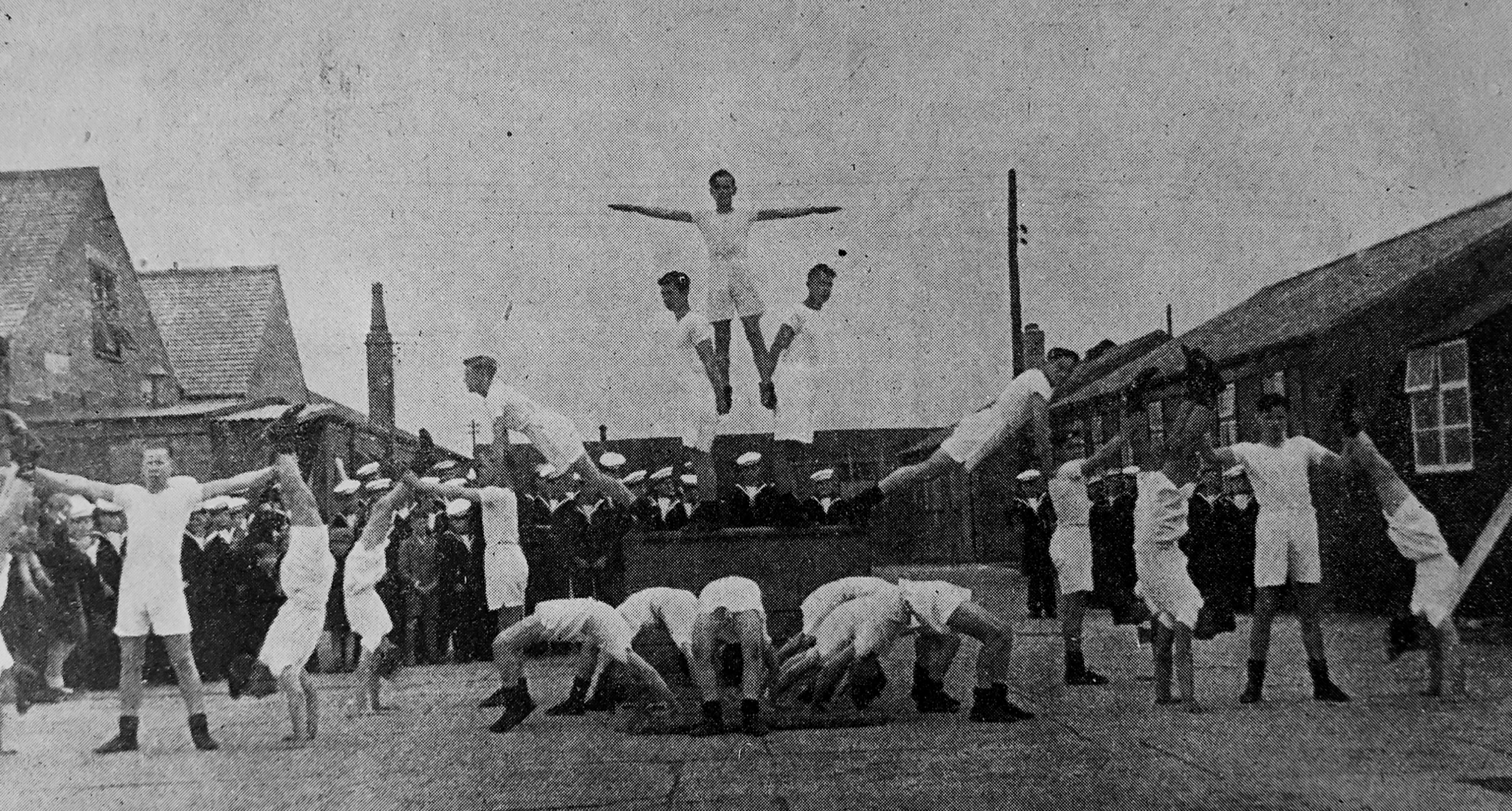
Gymnastic Display - Prize Day, 1947

Following a post-war lull there was a dramatic increase in incidents of juvenile delinquency in the UK from 1954. The Home Office research unit was at a loss to explain the rise. It would be wrong to characterise the typical 'Wellesley boy' as a juvenile delinquent however the type of juvenile crime for which magistrates would give custodial sentences in approved schools would play in to the authorites' and the public's perception of Teddy Boys, violent gangs and anti-social behaviour. It is in this context that we can understand a slightly different approach taken by Haydn Davies Jones, during his time as the school Captain from 1955 to 1961.

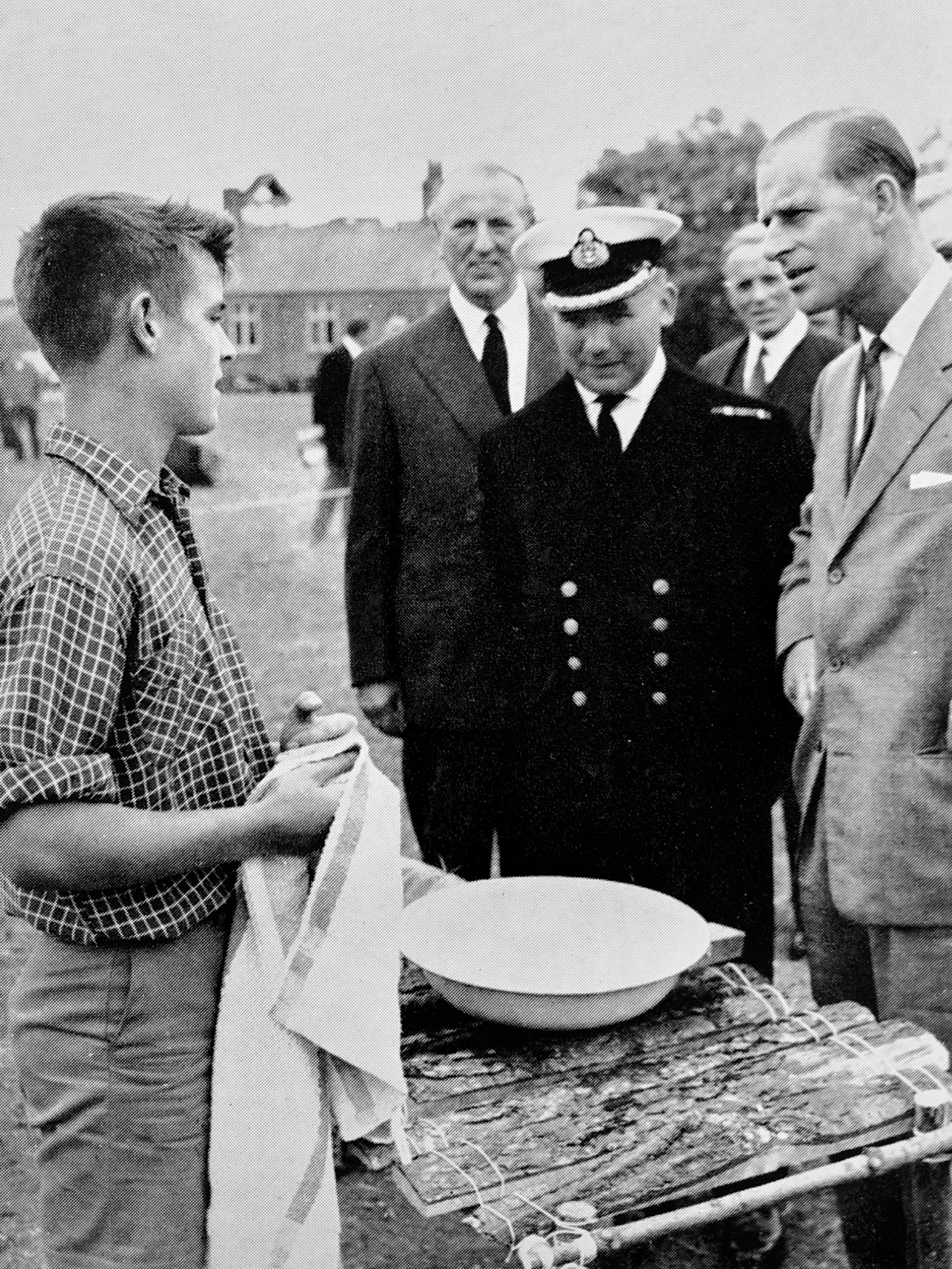
Prince Philip and Captain Davies Jones inspect work presented for the Duke of Edinburgh Award Scheme

"He was a leading practitioner and academic in the residential care of children. A lifelong socialist, he believed that everyone deserved a chance." At this time the approved school had "140 boys, mostly committed by the courts". He introduced a house system with "housemasters to work on a more personal level and began the Duke of Edinburgh award".

R.D.Swanston took over the Wellesley Nautical School in 1961. He oversaw a long term programme to replace the temporary buildings. The first phase was the construction of 14 staff houses alongside the Links Road and was completed in 1964. Two years later Captain Swanston described the next phase as ' The biggest change in the life of the school with the use of the House Units. Now each group of thirty boys will have its own accommodation and a housemaster [with integrated staff accommodation] whose single concern will be the welfare and social training of the boys of his house.' The final phase of building was the construction of a new block of Trade Training Departments. Captain Swanston in 1968 reflected on general changes that had occurred: 'The Staffing ratio has improved over the years ...The boys are from an older age group (15-17 on admission), do not stay as long and the majority are under court orders.'

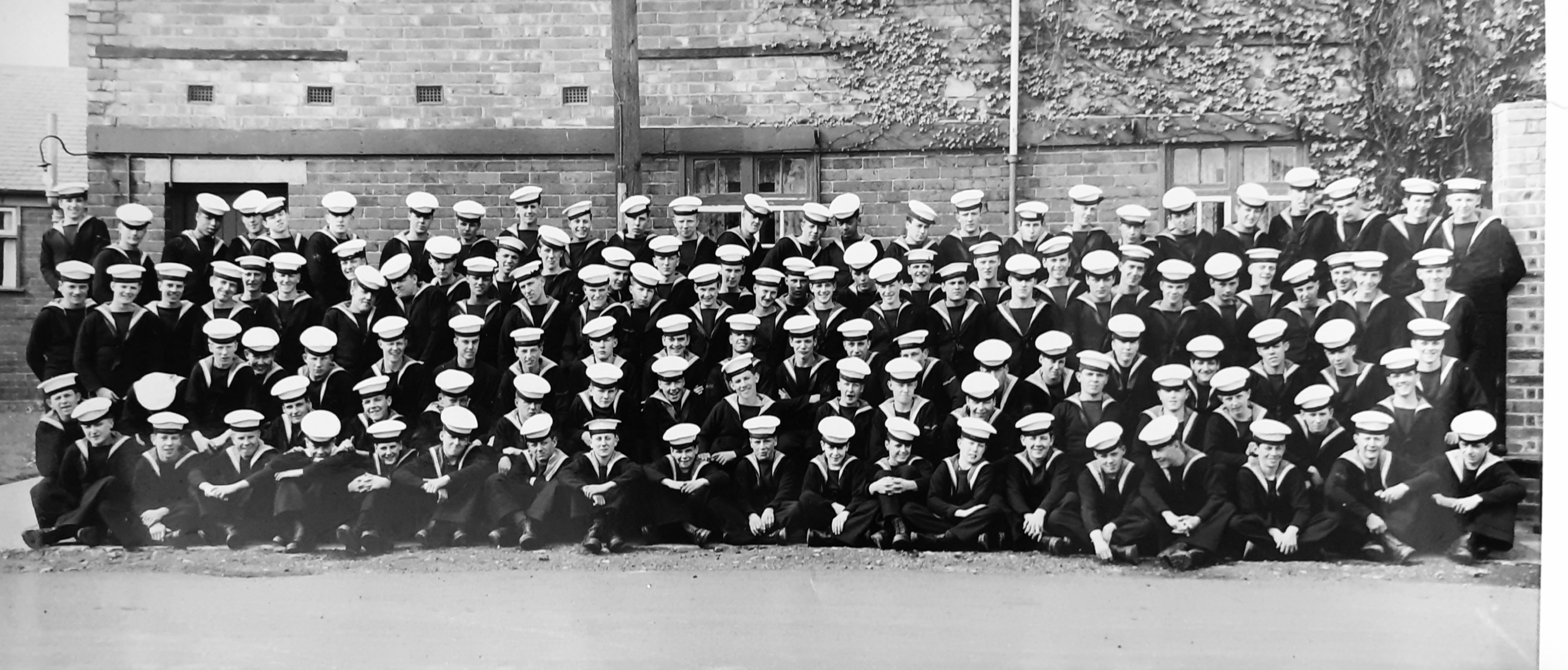
Boys of the Wellesley Nautical School

In 1973, following substantial changes in the treatment of young boys incorporated in the Children and Young Persons Act 1969, Wellesley became part of The City of Sunderland's Council's Social Services Department, The nautical element continued into the 1970s with, for example, the maintaining of the school's training vessel M.V. Admiral Collingwood and the school's name 'Wellesley Nautical Community School'. Over the last thirty years of its operation there was a distinct move away from sea-going training towards more general education and training as "Wellesley Community Home".

After being refused planning permission by Blyth Valley Council to make improvements to the site, an appeal was made and won by Sunderland Council. However, after much consideration it was decided by Sunderland that the home would be closed; the Wellesley Community Home officially closed its doors on 6 November 2006.

== Alumni ==
- Wilf Pine (1944–2018), English music manager, record producer and gangster

== Notes ==
- This article contains text from the Wellesley Nautical School Home Site, by kind permission of the author
