= HMS Boscawen (1844) =

Ship of the line of the Royal Navy

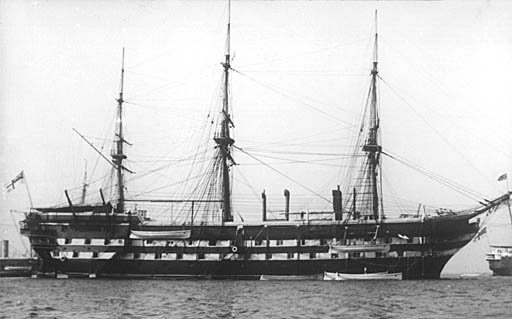
- HMS Boscawan in later life as the training ship Wellesley, 1904

History

United Kingdom
- Name: HMS Boscawen
- Ordered: 11 May 1817
- Builder: Woolwich Dockyard
- Laid down: January 1826
- Launched: 3 April 1844
- Renamed: Wellesley 1873
- Fate: Burned and sank 11 March 1914; Broken up 1914

General characteristics
- Class & type: 70-gun third rate ship of the line
- Tons burthen: 2048 tons
- Length: 187 ft 4 1/2 in (57.1 m) (gundeck)
- Beam: 50 ft 9 in (15.47 m)
- Depth of hold: 21 ft 6 in (6.55 m)
- Propulsion: Sails
- Sail plan: Full-rigged ship
- Armament: 70 guns: Gundeck: 28 × 32 pdrs, 2 × 68 pdr carronades; Upper gundeck: 32 × 24 pdrs; Quarterdeck: 4 × 24 pdrs, 10 × 32 pdr carronades; Forecastle: 2 × 24 pdrs, 2 × 32 pdr carronades

HMS Boscawan was a 70-gun third rate ship of the line of the Royal Navy, launched on 3 April 1844 at Woolwich Dockyard. She was originally ordered in 1812 and begun as a 74-gun Vengeur-class ship of the line, but the order was cancelled and her frames placed instorage; an Admiralty order dated 3 March 1834 required that those frames be reworked to Sir William Symonds' design. She was named for Admiral Edward Boscawen.

Boscawen served at the Cape of Good Hope Station from May 1856 to March 1860.

Returning to England that year, she was fitted out as a training ship, initially being based at Southampton (1862–1865), then at Portland Harbour from 1867. In 1873 she was replaced at Portland by HMS Trafalgar (which was itself renamed HMS Boscawen; afterwards the name Boscawen remained associated with the training establishment at Portland into the 20th century, and was subsequently attached to the Naval Base there from the 1930s until after the Second World War).

In 1873, HMS Boscawen replaced Wellesley – the former HMS Cornwall – as the training ship at Wellesley Nautical School on Tyneside and was herself renamed TS Wellesley.

On the afternoon of 11 March 1914, Wellesley was destroyed by fire and sank at her moorings on the River Tyne at North Shields. A total loss, she was broken up later in 1914.
