= Roy Shaw =

English boxer

Royston Henry Shaw (11 March 1936 – 14 July 2012), also known as Roy "Pretty Boy" Shaw, Roy "Mean Machine" Shaw and Roy West, was a property investor, author and businessman from the East End of London who was formerly a criminal and Category A prisoner. During the 1970s & 80s Shaw was active in the criminal underworld of south London and was close friends with Joey Pyle. Shaw is best remembered today for his career as a fighter on the unlicensed boxing scene, becoming an arch-rival of Lenny McLean.

== Early life ==
Shaw was born in Stepney, London, to a working-class family and from an early age was involved in illegal activities. He was acquainted with the Kray twins since at least the very early 1960s; Shaw attended the funeral of Reggie Kray in 2000, and was quoted as having said: "We grew up in the same era. They were into protection rackets and I was into blags. I never got in their way and they never got in mine. Ronnie was more of a friend than Reggie, but I've come along today because he was one of the 'chaps'. Today is like the end of an era. The Krays were legends." As an adult Shaw mainly lived in Bethnal Green.

== Prison sentences ==
Shaw was sentenced to 18 years' imprisonment for an armed robbery in 1963, one of England's largest armoured truck robberies. Shaw reportedly fought his way out of two different holding cells at HM Prison Maidstone, assaulting several prison guards.

Shaw, who claimed he "simply hates the system", and that the "system could never beat him", was moved between different prisons and spent time at Broadmoor Hospital. According to Shaw's autobiography, Pretty Boy (1999), "uncontrollable prisoners were deliberately drugged up with the aim of turning them into permanent 'cabbages'". At Broadmoor, Shaw underwent experimental electroconvulsive therapy in an attempt to control his temper. His doctor claimed that Shaw had at first come across as a large and intimidating yet soft-spoken gentleman, but when faced with treatment he didn't want, Shaw became "the most powerful and dangerous man I have ever tried to treat". The doctor reported the treatments as having been a complete failure, and only served to make Shaw even more aggressive and unpredictable.

Shaw routinely stabbed police informers and even slashed the throat of a former best friend while incarcerated owing to his strong belief in a "code of honour" among criminals that must not be broken.

During his time in Broadmoor, Shaw again encountered Ronnie Kray. He also spent time with such people as Ronnie Biggs and Charles Bronson at other prisons. By 1974, Shaw had already spent around 18 years in more than 22 different prisons.

== Unlicensed boxing career ==
In his autobiography "Pretty Boy", Shaw claimed to have had ten pro fights using the alias "Roy West". In fact he had only one professional bout - a six round points win against Dennis Wingrove at Wembley Town Hall on 29 November 1956. Roy soon gave up the idea of boxing for a living when he found out that he could earn more money by robbing cash vans.

On his release from prison Shaw started fighting on unlicensed boxing shows which were promoted by his mate and fellow villain Joey Pyle and gained many infamous victories, the most notable being a one round knockout of Donnie "The Bull" Adams. In 1977 Shaw also beat former heavyweight contender Ron Stander who had fought Joe Frazier for the world heavyweight title five years before. Stander, however, broke a rib before the fight which severely hampered his performance. Shaw would later say in his book that he kept hitting Stander with punches which had no effect on Stander until he found his broken rib. In Shaw's words: "If Stander had not broken his rib he would have mullered me."

Shaw was best known for his infamous trilogy with arch-rival Lenny "The Guv'nor" McLean. Shaw beat McLean in their first fight, but lost in two other matches to McLean. Shaw claimed in his autobiography that they only fought twice, but later he admitted on his website that there were indeed three fights with McLean of which he lost two and won one. However, McLean was by far the bigger man and also much younger than Shaw. Shaw was well into his forties when he and McLean fought and was giving away stones in weight. Shaw stated on his website that the two unlicensed boxers he most admired were Cliff Field and Johnny Waldron, both of whom also defeated McLean.

=== Unlicensed boxing record ===
9 Wins (8 KOs), 2 Losses
Res.	Record	Opponent	Type	Round	Date	Location	Notes
Win	9–2	Kevin Paddock	PTS	8	24 November 1981	Ilford Palais, London	
Win	8–2	Lou 'Wild Thing' Yates	TKO	3	24 October 1981	Ilford Palais, London	
Win	7–2	Harry Starbuck	KO	1	29 June 1979	Dartford Football Stadium, Dartford	
Loss	6–2	Lenny McLean	KO	1	11 September 1978	Rainbow Theatre, Finsbury Park, London	For title of The Guv'nor.
Loss	6–1	Lenny McLean	KO	1	10 April 1978	Cinatra's Nightclub, Croydon, London	Lost title of The Guv'nor.
Win	6–0	Ron Stander	KO	3	xx-xx-1977	Alexandra Palace, London	Remained The Guv'nor.
Win	5–0	Lenny McLean	TKO	3	23 May 1977	Cinatra’s Nightclub, Croydon, London	Remained The Guv'nor.
Win	4–0	Terry Hollingsworth	KO	1	22 March 197?	Cinatra's Nightclub, Croydon, London	Remained The Guv'nor.
Win	3–0	Mickey Gluxted	TKO	3	7 July 197?	Dagenham Working Mens Club, Dagenham	Remained The Guv'nor.
Win	2–0	Paddy 'Mad Dog' Mullins	KO	1	xx-xx-xxxx		Remained The Guv'nor.
Win	1–0	Donny 'The Bull' Adams	KO	1	1 December 1975	Billy Smart's Big Top, Windsor	Became The Guv'nor.

== In other media ==
=== Press ===
Shaw was something of a minor celebrity in the tabloids in the late 1970s and early 1980s. Shaw has also sometimes appeared in the press over the years, such as his attending of Ronnie Kray's funeral, or his 2009 court case (see 2009 court case section below).

=== DVD ===
Shaw was the subject of a 2006 documentary DVD entitled Roy Shaw: Brute Force. It was directed by Liam Galvin and contained original footage of Shaw's unlicensed boxing matches, and also interviews with Shaw himself and other former criminal underworld figures and boxers he was associated with. It was followed up with a second DVD Roy Shaw's Fight School. In 2010, he appeared in Galvin's movie Killer Bitch which featured a host of criminals.

=== Books ===
Shaw has been mentioned or discussed in numerous books, most notably in arch-rival Lenny McLean's 1998 autobiography The Guv'Nor. and Hard Bastards by Kate Kray.

Shaw co-wrote a book with Kate Kray, the widow of Ronnie Kray, entitled Roy Shaw: Unleashed (2003). The book is a collection of stories and anecdotes about the criminal underworld of London in the 1970s/1980s, as well as Shaw's boxing career. Shaw's autobiography, entitled Pretty Boy (2003), was also co-written by Kray. It goes into further detail Shaw's early life, personal and private life, time in prison, and also expanding on stories begun in his previous book. A book written by Jamie Boyle & Gary Shaw, Roy’s son, called ‘Mean Machine. Roy Shaw’ was published by Warcrypress in 2019. It features many stories of Roy that had never been published.

=== Music ===
Roy Shaw was celebrated in song in 2011 when a group called The Sharks released "The King Of London (aka The Ballad Of Pretty Boy Shaw)". The song was written by band member Alan Wilson who met and became friends with Roy Shaw via their mutual friend Ronnie Biggs.

== Later life ==
Shaw was married and is survived by a son, daughter and grandchildren. He latterly lived in Waltham Abbey, Essex with two Rottweilers as pets.

In 2000, Shaw was one of the best known mourners to attend the funeral of Reggie Kray, a lifelong friend. Shaw said of Kray: "Kray came from an era before drugs became common currency, when there was honour among thieves and few criminals double-crossed their friends. In those days there was loyalty. Nowadays they are all having each other over all the time."

Having served all his prison sentences, Shaw stated that he was going straight and had retired from any criminal activity and bareknuckle boxing. Shaw became a businessman and author with numerous financial and non-financial ventures, such as a best-selling autobiography. He appeared in two documentary DVDs by Director Liam Galvin, 'Roy Shaw: Brute Force' and 'Roy Shaw-Fight School' and later made a cameo in the film Killer Bitch, he also became involved in numerous internet ventures, and property investment. The land investments, something Shaw had been involved in since before his first prison sentence, were the ventures which eventually made Shaw a millionaire.

=== 2009 land sale court case ===
Shaw formerly owned highly valued land in Chadwell Heath, east London, which he sold in a £2.6 million land sale in 2008. Shaw gave £643,000 of this to Linda Finnimore, 43, someone who Roy had met when he was battling early stages of Alzheimers and he believed she was helping him with his business affairs and that she was battling cancer, both of which turned out to be untrue.

After Roy's family had discovered what had happened due to questions being raised by Roy's bank calling his daughter Chettina, who had his power of attorney, because there was further very large transfer sums of money being requested for transfer, they took her to court. Lindsay Finnimore made claims to being his girlfriend and in a bid to have access to his assets made claims to being his common law wife. Roy said that he believed she was very intelligent and helping him but didn't find her attractive or girlfriend material. High Court judge Sir John Lindsay said that Finnimore had been "untruthful" in her case evidence. Of Finnimore, the judge said: "She, for whom the word 'feisty' could have been minted, is more educated than he and far more intelligent. Unfortunately, her considerable skills have not always been applied to acceptable purposes." Mark Morris of Aardvark Forensics Ltd provided expert evidence to the Court and demonstrated how a number of forged documents had been created on a personal computer.

Mr Justice Lindsay ultimately dismissed Miss Finnimore's claims against Shaw in March 2009 and ordered Finnimore to repay the money, together with sums of £208,450, £20,000 and £57,000, plus interest. Shaw was awarded nearly £1 million in total. Judge Lindsay said that when it was put to Shaw in court that he intended to transfer £643,000 to her, he replied: "Don't talk so silly – she took me for a right mug."
