= Joseph Galizia =

American mobster

Joseph "Joe Glitz" Galizia (July 24, 1941 – 1998) was a New York mobster who became a high-ranking soldier in the Genovese crime family, and ran a large gasoline bootlegging operation.

== Becoming a family member ==
In the mid-1970s, Galizia became a "made man" in the Genovese family by killing Genovese mobster Carlo "Collie" DiPietro. DiPietro had been a partner of both Galizia and future Gambino boss John Gotti, in a Queens flea market. During this time, Joe and Larry Galizia earned a reputation as a huge money maker, by moving his family into the extremely lucrative gasoline bootlegging rackets. While never attaining a position within the administration, Galizia became a very influential and wealthy mafioso who occasionally answered directly to Vincent Gigante and his uppermost family members, often going over his captain's head. Galizia maintained interests in several Queens and Long Island produce companies as well.

Galizia and his brother Larry ran construction schemes, loansharking, and extortion rackets in Queens, Brooklyn, Manhattan and Long Island. In the early 1980s, Larry went to federal prison for supervising a credit card fraud scheme. The Galizias also engaged in criminal activities with Genovese gangsters Rosario Gangi, Alphonse "Allie Shades" Malangone and Rudolph "Rudy Cueball" Izzi.

== Gasoline bootlegging partnership with the Russians ==
The gasoline bootlegging rackets were originally conceived by Russian mobsters; however, the Russians needed the cooperation of the New York Mafia Five Families to continue their business. Galizia's operation was run by Russian mob boss Marat Balagula and his associates Igor Roizman, Igor Porotsky, and Sheldon Levine. The mobsters would set up shell companies to distribute gasoline at a price fraudulently represented as including federal, state and local excise taxes. Naturally, the mobsters would in fact pay no tax on such sales. Should the operation be uncovered by the authorities, the shell companies would simply be closed, and others opened.

Another major figure in the gasoline racket scene was Colombo crime family capo Michael Franzese, a friend of Galizia.

== Federal indictments ==
In 1986, Galizia and six others were charged with evading over $11 million in taxes. All the defendants were eventually convicted or pleaded guilty, and all went to federal prison. In 1989, while in prison, Joe Galizia was suspected by federal investigators of ordering the murder of Michael Markowitz, a Russian gangster. Markowitz was shot dead in Brooklyn by Joseph Reisch. Galizia would be indicted again on similar charges in 1991.

An investigation by the New York State Governor's office reported that the New York Five Families bootlegging scheme avoided taxes on one out of every ten gallons of gasoline brought into the metropolitan area. The report stated that gasoline bootlegging had become the mob's most profitable scheme.

== LCN group running the gasoline rackets ==
In being one of the Genovese family's first point-men in the gasoline bootlegging racket, Galizia was involved in the setting up of a council of mobsters that decided which wiseguys and families had the rights to which companies and profits. Other wiseguys involved in the operation included Genovese soldier Daniel "Danny" Pagano (based in the Bronx and East Harlem), Gambino captain Anthony "Fat Tony" Morelli (based in Staten Island), Gambino soldier Genaro "Jimmy Sweats" Dellamonica (Morelli Staten Island crew), Lucchese family underboss Anthony "Gaspipe" Casso (who testified before Congress about the Mob's involvement with the Russians), Colombo capo Victor Orena, Jr. (son of the family's former acting boss), Colombo soldiers Frank "Frankie the Bug" Sciortino and Joseph Audino (both Orena crew members)

== Family ties ==
Joseph Galizia's brother Lawrence "Larry Glitz" Galizia is a Genovese soldier. Joseph Galizia's son Lawrence, a Genovese associate, was arrested in 2001 on federal loan sharking charges.

Former Gambino underboss Salvatore "Sammy the Bull" Gravano testified that at Galizia's son's wedding in the early-1990s, a sitdown was held between Gambino boss John Gotti and Patriarca crime family captain Junior Russo to avoid a shooting war with the family's new boss, Raymond Patriarca, Jr.
