= Don Adams (boxer) =

English boxer

Don "The Bull" Adams (born c.1930) was a bare-knuckle boxer, from Waltham Cross, Hertfordshire, England. In addition he was known as King of the Gypsies. At least one of his fights was detected by the authorities. Hertfordshire Constabulary reported a planned fight at Holborn Stud Farm on Sunday, 26 October 1975, between Don “The Bull” Adams and Roy “Pretty Boy” Shaw, promoted by Adams’ trainer Tom “The Bear” Brown. Donny Adams's second for the fight was an Ex Royal Air Force policeman named Huw Rees. This fight was banned, but must have taken place later, as Shaw was reported later to have beaten Adams. Shaw won the bout in the first round. Before that fight Adams had 48 bare knuckle fights and won them all.

Adams had three children, a son called Donnie and two daughters, Amanda and Chrystal.

== See also ==
- List of bare-knuckle boxers
