= Daniel Pagano =

American mobster

Daniel Pagano (pronounced "Pah-GAH-noh") (born 1953) is a New York mobster and the current acting boss in the Genovese crime family since 2025, who was involved in a major gasoline bootlegging racket of the 1980s.

Born in New York, Pagano is the son of Joe Pagano, whom according to law enforcement, he had served as a captain in the Genovese family. In March 1973, Pagano was arrested for assault, robbery, attempted murder of a policeman, resisting arrest and possession of narcotics. Pagano was shot in the thigh by a police officer allegedly during a cocaine sale in Manhattan, the police officer had claimed self-defence claiming that Pagano was ready to shoot the officer first. According to law enforcement, an undercover officer attempted to purchase 10 ounces of cocaine for $6,000, before Pagano robbed the undercover agent by holding a pistol to his head and retrieved from his possession of 4 ounces of cocaine and $3500 in cash.

== Meeting with Sharpton ==
In the early 1980s, Pagano became acquainted with African-American activist Al Sharpton. In 1983, Colombo crime family mobster Michael Franzese arranged a meeting with Pagano, Sharpton, and another mob associate (who was an undercover Federal Bureau of Investigation (FBI) agent). The meeting was ostensibly about the mob associate asking Sharpton for an introduction to boxing promoter Don King. However, during the meeting, the associate unsuccessfully tried to enlist Sharpton's assistance in distributing narcotics. After the meeting, the FBI approached Sharpton and allegedly garnered his assistance as an informant against Pagano. However, Sharpton denies this claim to this day.

== Promotion ==
In the late 1980s, Pagano became a made man, or full member, of the Genovese family. He operated in the Bronx and Manhattan and was close to Genovese capo Dominick "Quiet Dom" Cirillo. With the incarceration of Genovese soldier Joseph "Joe Glitz" Galizia, Pagano was promoted to capo. Pagano oversaw the family's numbers game and sports betting rackets in East Harlem, which were operated by the Pisacano brothers. Pagano also owned a business interest in Third World Records, an African/Latino music label in New York.

In June 1989, Pagano was indicted on charges of illegal gambling, loan sharking and extortion in Westchester County and Rockland County north of New York City. Pagano and his associates mediated disputes between trash haulers in the area, exercised control over a waterfront construction project in Yonkers, New York, and conducted loansharking activities. Pagano eventually pleaded guilty to criminal usury and promoting gambling.

== Gasoline bootlegging ==
After becoming capo, Pagano became the Genovese family contact in the "Gasoline Bootlegging Rackets". Originated in the 1980s by a Soviet Jewish crime family led by Marat Balagula and based in Brighton Beach, Brooklyn, the scam involved fake transactions of large quantities of gasoline and diesel that defrauded the State of New York out of hundreds of millions in excise taxes. When the New York's Cosa Nostra families discovered the scam, the Genovese and three other families forced Organizatsiya to pay them a cut of their illegal profits. The families set up a group known as the Association to run the scam. Pagano and his trusted aide, mobster Anthony Palumbo, represented the Genovese interests in the Association.

In late 1992 or early 1993, Pagano thwarted a proposed murder of a Russian mobster. Palumbo's business partner, Russian mobster Victor Zilber, asked him to arrange the murder of a Zilber employee, Russian mobster Monya Elson. When Palumbo approached Pagano for approval, Pagano immediately vetoed the hit. Pagano was afraid that killing Elson would cause major problems with the Organizatsia.

In the early-1990s, the FBI and the U.S. Internal Revenue Service (IRS) set up a fake fuel company in Trenton, New Jersey, as part of "Red Daisy", a sting operation aimed against the bootlegging ring. In February 1992, a suspicious fire destroyed the company facilities. Soon after the fire, a mob associate approached the company owners and informed them that they would have to pay a "mob tax" to sell the bootleg gasoline.

In September 1996, Pagano and Palumbo were indicted on charges of defrauding the government of $77 million in tax revenues. In September 1999, Pagano pleaded guilty to motor fuel tax evasion and was sentenced to 105 months in prison. As a result of his imprisonment, Pagano lost control of many of his former rackets, including the Pisacano brothers illegal gambling operation. On May 12, 2007, Pagano was released from federal prison.
