= Approved school =

Type of youth prison in the United Kingdom

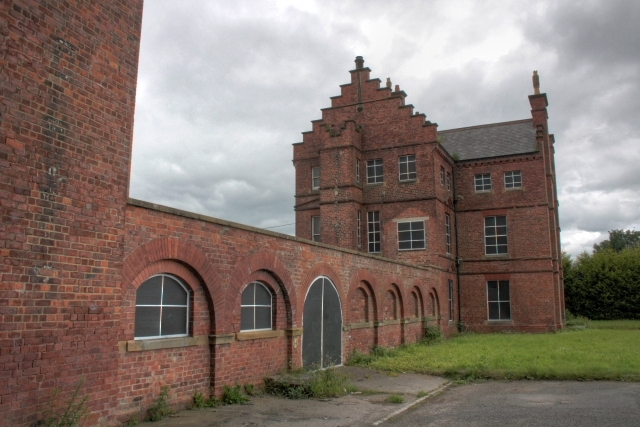
St. Peter's School in County Durham, which was converted to an approved school after the Second World War.

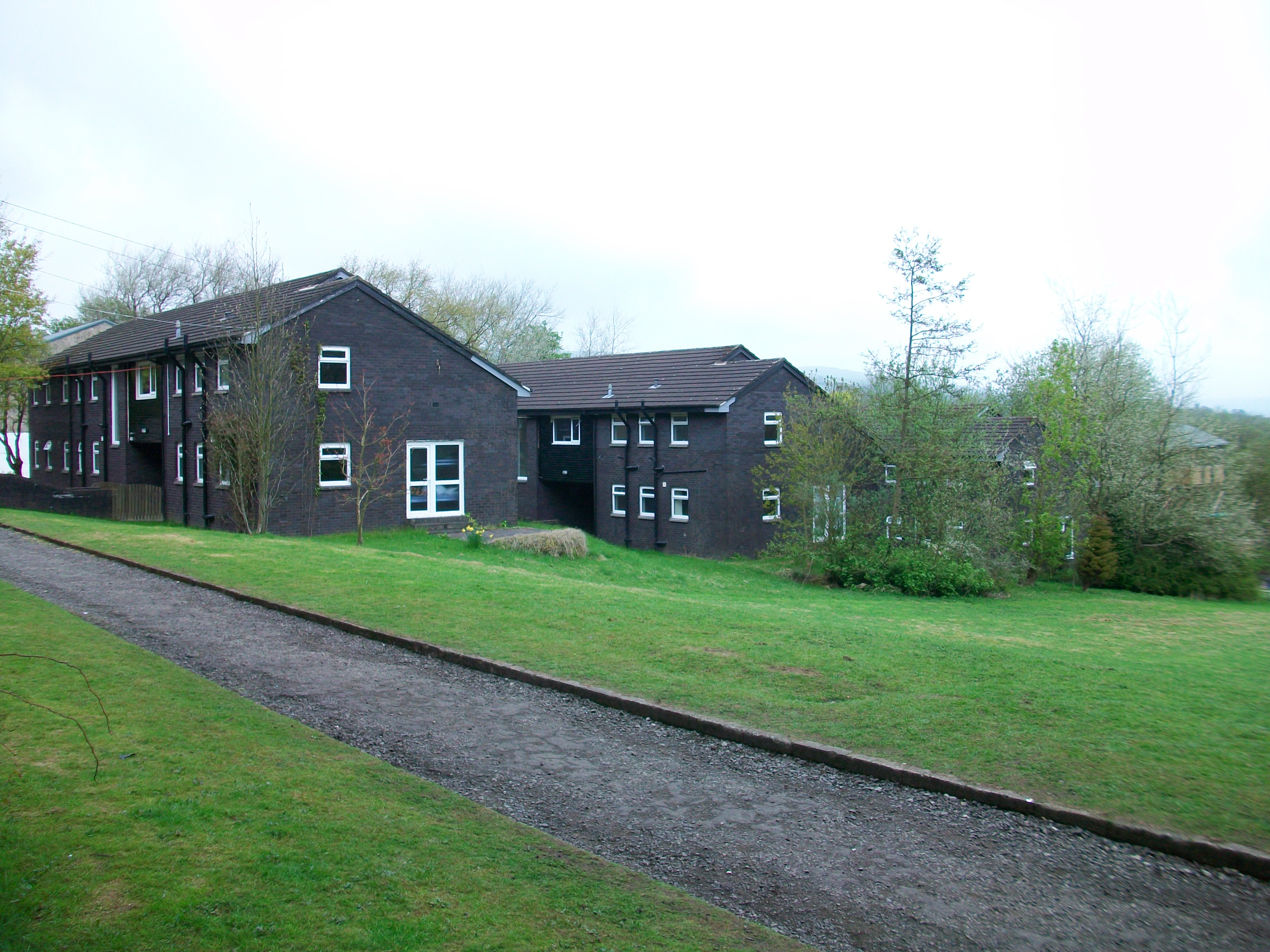
Accommodation blocks near Dobroyd Castle, used when it was an approved school.

An approved school was a type of residential institution in the United Kingdom to which young people could be sent by a court, usually for committing offences but sometimes because they were deemed to be beyond parental control. They were modelled on ordinary boarding schools, from which it was relatively easy to leave without permission. This set approved schools apart from borstals, a tougher and more enclosed kind of youth prison.

The term came into general use in 1933 when approved schools were created out of the earlier "industrial" and "reformatory" schools. Following the Children and Young Persons Act 1969, they were replaced by Community Homes, with responsibility devolved to local councils; in Singapore, which by 1971, was no longer under British rule, the term approved schools continued to exist.

== UK regulations ==
Approved schools were mostly run by voluntary bodies, under the overall supervision of the Home Office or the Scottish Education Department, and subject to the Approved School Rules 1933. The Home Office maintained a team of inspectors who visited each institution from time to time. In Scotland the Education Department made the appropriate arrangements for inspection and administration.

Offenders sent to approved schools, as well as receiving academic tuition, were assigned to work groups for such activities as building and bricklaying, metalwork, carpentry and gardening. Many approved schools were known for strict discipline, with corporal punishment used where deemed necessary, generally a rather more severe version of the caning or strapping that was common in ordinary secondary schools. In particular, boys who absconded were given a maximum caning of 8 strokes on the clothed bottom immediately on return to the school, and a 1971 statistical study found that this could be an effective deterrent. (Girls could be caned only on the hand.)

In Scotland, after 1961, only Heads of Schools were allowed to apply corporal punishment, using a strap. Each incident had to be recorded in the School's Punishment Book designating the offence and the part of the child's body. This would then be counter-signed by school medical officers during their weekly visit. Increases in the frequency of Home Leave and the introduction of a wider range of privileges offered scope for regimes without corporal punishment.

== Age groups ==
Approved schools were split into three age groups: Junior, Intermediate and Senior. Most were for boys; there was a small number of separate approved schools for girls.

== Community homes ==
The term "approved school" officially ceased to exist in the UK in the early 1970s. In England and Wales, as a result of the Children and Young Persons Act 1969, responsibility for these institutions was devolved from central government to local councils and they were renamed "Community Homes".

In Scotland, after the Kilbrandon Report was published, its recommendations were incorporated in the Social Work (Scotland) Act 1968 (c. 49), and with the introduction of Children's Hearings, the administration for offending children continued to differ from that in England.
