= Mathew Bevan =

British computer hacker (born 1974)

- Mathew Bevan
- Born: 10 June 1974 (age 52); Cardiff, Wales
- Other name: Kuji
- Occupation: Hacker
- Known for: Hacking

Mathew Bevan (born 10 June 1974) is a British hacker from Cardiff, Wales. In 1996 he was arrested for hacking into secure U.S. Government networks under the handle Kuji. At the age of 21, he hacked into the files of the Air Force Research Laboratory at Griffiss Air Force Base in Rome, New York.

Bevan was intent on proving a UFO conspiracy theory. His sole tool was an Amiga home computer with the blue box program Roxbox. According to Air Force Office of Special Investigations Supervisory Special Agent Jim Christy, Bevan was one of two hackers who had nearly started a third world war.

== Background ==
Bullied by his peers, Bevan had a difficult time with school and at night he would turn to the online world as an escape. Having learned how to manipulate the public telephone system, he could place calls to anywhere in the world and the normal charges would not appear on his telephone bill. Bevan began to lead a double-life, going to school during the day, then later engaging in the nocturnal hacking activities which were eventually discovered.

A statement by the United States Senate Permanent Subcommittee on Investigations declared that Bevan, identified by his pseudonym 'Kuji', was a "Foreign Agent, possibly of Eastern European origin". Authorities began to investigate Bevan during their pursuit of Bevan's partner Richard Pryce (whose handle was "Datastream Cowboy"). Pryce, then 16 years old, had allegedly hacked his way into a research facility in Korea, and dumped the contents of the Korean Atomic Energy Research Institute's database into the United States Air Force (USAF) computer system. (A primary concern was that if North Korea had found this out, they would have seen the theft of their data as an intrusion committed by the USAF, and would have retaliated for the espionage; the data was found to actually be South Korean data.)

On 21 June 1996, Bevan was arrested for hacking into sensitive USAF, NASA, and NATO facilities.

Eighteen months later, in Woolwich Crown Court, the Crown Prosecution Service decided that it was no longer in the public interest to pursue the case. They offered 'no evidence' which resulted in a full acquittal being recorded.

Bevan has commented on the Gary McKinnon case as being very similar to his own.
