= Joseph Luco Pagano =

American mobster (1928–1989)

- Born: 1928; New York City, New York, U.S.
- Died: 1989 (aged 60–61); Upstate New York, U.S.
- Relatives: Pasquale Pagano (brother)
- Allegiance: Genovese crime family
- Criminal charges: Robbery, assault with a deadly weapon, narcotics trafficking
- Penalty: 7 years imprisonment (1955)

Joseph Luco Pagano (1928–1989) was a New York mobster and member of the Genovese crime family.

== Biography ==
Born in New York, Pagano and his brother Pasquale Pagano joined the Genovese family in the late 1940s. With an arrest record dating back to 1946, Pagano had been charged with robbery, assault with a deadly weapon, and narcotics trafficking. Pagano worked with Genovese mobster and future government informant Joe Valachi in Anthony Strollo's organization, then one of the biggest distributors of heroin and cocaine in the East Harlem section of Manhattan. While working for Strollo, Pagano participated in the gangland slaying of Eugenio Giannini and Steve Franse. In 1955, Pagano served a seven-year prison term.

In a 1977 article, the New York Times said that Pagano had ordered beatings and arson attacks against Bronx health facility operators to gain their participation in a scheme to extort thousands of dollars from the Medicaid health insurance fund.

In 1989, Pagano died in his Upstate New York home.
