= Alphonso Sgroia =

American mobster

Alfonso Sgroia, also known as "The Butcher" (19 July 1886 – 10 May 1940) was a New York gang member who became a hitman for the Navy Street gang connected to the Camorra in New York City.

Born in Italy, Sgroia immigrated with his family to New York in 1899, aged 13. Sgroia opened a butcher shop and lived with his brother Biagio on 117th Street in Harlem. At some point, Sgroia became an enforcer for the Navy Street gang, a street gang in Brooklyn associated with the Camorra criminal organization. On 24 June 1916, members of the rival Manhattan Sicilian Morello Gang met with the Navy gang and its ally, the Coney Island gang, to discuss the division of criminal activities in New York. Unhappy with the meeting outcome, the Navy Gang decided to kill the Morello family gang boss Nicholas Morello (né Nicolò Terranova).

On 7 September 1916, Sgroia and other gang members ambushed Morello and his associate, Charles Ubriaco, who had been lured into a trap after having a few drinks and were on their way to a coffee house. In March 1917, Sgroia participated in the murder of Generoso Nazzaro. In May 1917, a Navy Street gang member became a government witness and implicated Sgroia in the Morello murder.

Sgroia was convicted of manslaughter and sentenced to 12 years in prison. Sgroia eventually testified against the gang and received a shortened sentence. After his release from prison, Sgroia was deported to Italy. He was convinced to briefly return to New York by the prosecutors at the trial of Tony Paretti, where Sgroia gave evidence against him, leading to his conviction. After that, he returned once again to Italy, where he lived a normal life with his family, until he died on 10 May 1940, aged 53.

== Sources ==
- Critchley, David (2009). The origin of organized crime in America : the New York City mafia, 1891-1931. New York: Routledge. ISBN 978-0415882576.
- Dash, Mike (2010). The first family : terror, extortion, revenge, murder, and the birth of the American mafia. New York: Ballantine Books. ISBN 978-0345523570.
