= Giosuè Gallucci =

New York City crime boss (1864–1915)

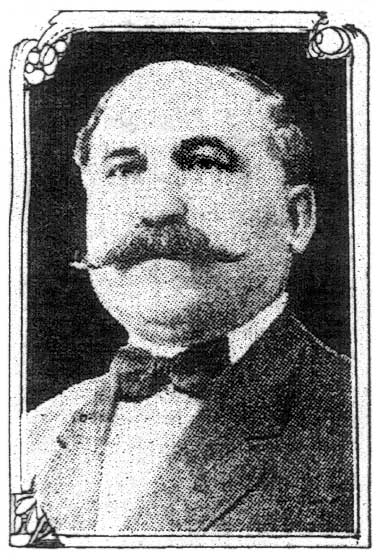
- Born: December 10, 1864; Naples, Kingdom of Italy
- Died: May 21, 1915 (aged 50); New York City, U.S.
- Cause of death: Gunshot wounds
- Other names: Luccariello; The King of Little Italy; The Major of Little Italy
- Known for: Organized crime
- Allegiance: Camorra in New York

Giosuè Gallucci (Italian pronunciation: [dʒozuˈɛ ɡɡalˈluttʃi]; December 10, 1864 – May 21, 1915), also known as Luccariello, was a crime boss of Italian Harlem in New York City affiliated with the local Camorra. He dominated the area from 1910 to 1915 and was also known as the undisputed "King of Little Italy" or "The Boss", due to his power in the criminal underworld and political connections. He held strict control over the policy game (numbers racket), employing Neapolitan and Sicilian street gangs as his enforcers.

Born in Naples, Italy, Gallucci became one of the most powerful Italians politically in the city. With his ability to mobilize the vote in Harlem and register immigrants, he delivered a significant number of ballots. He gained near immunity from law enforcement by allying with Tammany Hall, a Democratic political machine that ruled Manhattan and New York City politics almost unopposed. Despite his power and political clout, Gallucci was subject to Black Hand extortion and his rule was challenged frequently. In 1915, he was killed by a rival gang. The fight over the lucrative numbers rackets left behind by Gallucci was known as the Mafia–Camorra War.

== Early life and career ==
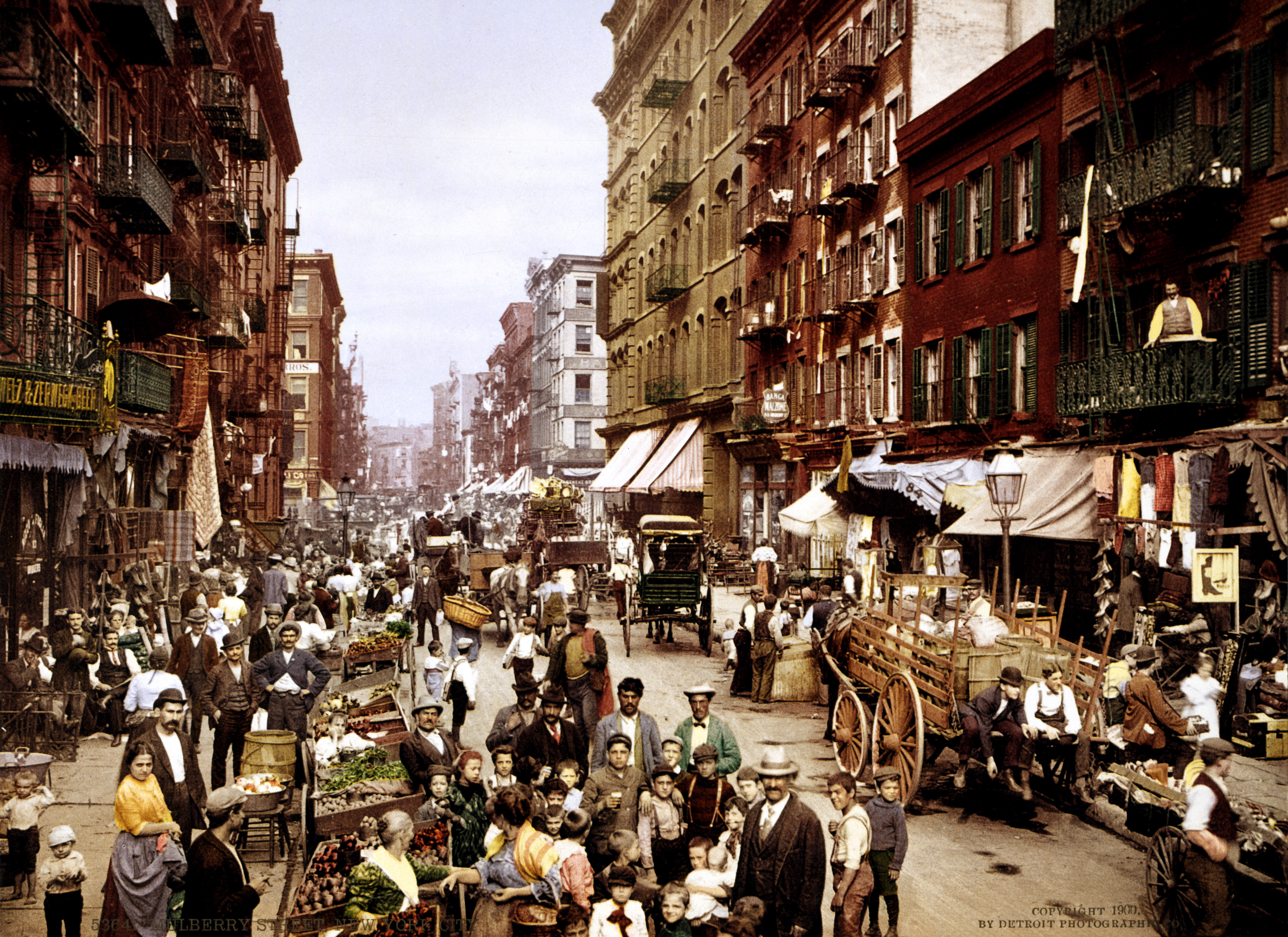
Little Italy in New York, c. 1900

Giosuè Gallucci was born in Naples, Italy, on December 10, 1864, to Luca Gallucci and Antonia Cavallo. He was also known by his nickname Luccariello. In Italy, a Naples court sentenced Gallucci in 1883 for breaking parole, resisting arrest and perjury and in 1885 for assault and attempted extortion. On March 11, 1892, he arrived in New York City on the SS Werkendam from Rotterdam, the Netherlands. In doing so, he violated Italian emigration laws and was convicted in absentia for fraud. According to an Italian police report, he again left Italy on July 24, 1896. It was rumored that Gallucci had killed a man just before coming to New York, but he publicly denied this.

In April 1898, he was arrested in New York in connection with the murder of Josephine Inselma (or Giuseppina Anselmi), who was portrayed as Gallucci's companion by the police. Inselma was murdered with "her throat cut from ear to ear" in her apartment at 108 Mulberry Street within a block of the infamous Mulberry Bend. Gallucci's apprehension took place while he was operating a fruit wagon in the neighborhood; he was described as "a young grocer and expressman, with a store at 172 Mott Street". Gallucci said he had no reason to kill the woman and provided an alibi.

A grand jury dismissed the charges. New York City Police Department detective Joe Petrosino, who was in charge of the investigation, urged his superiors to inquire for more information in Italy. The police prefect of Naples responded, describing Gallucci as a "bad character" and "a dangerous criminal, belonging to the category of blackmailers" who had been placed under police surveillance and charged several times with theft, blackmail, and other crimes. (Note: An 1862 Naples police report identified brothers Giosuè and Giuseppe Gallucci as members of the Camorra, but it is unknown if they were relatives of Gallucci's.) His wife, the prefect added, was also "of bad character".

The criminal background of Giosue's brothers in Italy was even more extensive. Vincenzo Gallucci spent two terms in prison and was convicted sixteen times for assault, attempted murder and other crimes. Francesco Gallucci was convicted six times for attempted murder, theft, and assaulting the police. Vincenzo was shot in New York City on November 20, 1898, supposedly on orders from an Italian "secret society similar to the Mafia". He died the next day. Francesco D'Angelo and Luigi LaRosa were accused of the killing; both pleaded guilty to manslaughter and were sentenced to 20 years and 15 years in prison, respectively.

According to Petrosino, the Galluccis were only three of the more than 1,000 Italian "rascals" from Naples and Sicily who had made New York City their home. They did not attract much attention because, "as a class, they rob their own people, and the Italian scheme of 'fix it myself' interferes to throw the police off the scent." Since they had been in the country for more than a year, the Galluccis could not be deported.

== Dominance in Little Italy and East Harlem ==
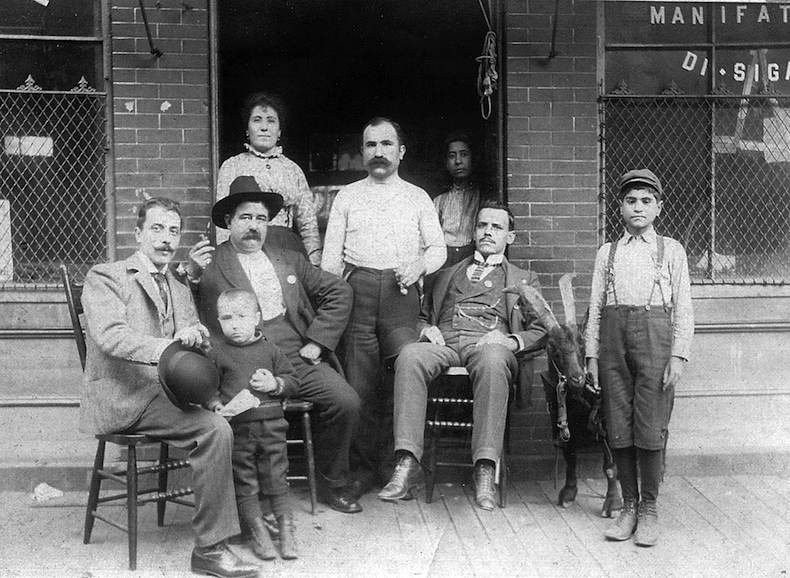
Giosuè Gallucci and wife Assunta (centre), John Russomanno (right) and Luca Gallucci (small boy to the left), outside Gallucci's East 109th Street cigar business, c. 1900

Gallucci built businesses in Little Italy and East Harlem, first on Mulberry Street and later in a three-story brick house with a bakery and an attached stable at 318 East 109th Street, and a cigar store at 329 East 109th Street. It was rumored that he ran a brothel at the intersection of East 109th Street with Second Avenue.

In 1910, he became the undisputed boss of Little Italy following the imprisonment of the Sicilian-American mafia leaders Giuseppe Morello and Ignazio Lupo on counterfeit charges. He owned many tenements in the area and controlled the coal and ice business, cobbler shops, the olive oil business and the lottery in the Italian neighborhoods. He was one of the biggest moneylenders and held strict control over the policy game (numbers racket), employing Neapolitan and Sicilian street gangs as his enforcers.

Gallucci ran what was supposed to be the New York office of the Royal Italian Lottery, which was a front for his own policy game selling thousands of tickets every month throughout Harlem. He ran the lottery from the basement of his home and had agents in many cities with Italian communities. Every month there was a grand drawing. There was only one prize of $1,000, but the winner of the prize was commonly robbed of the money when it was paid. According to the New York City Police Department, most of Gallucci's income originated "from his control of the policy playing in Harlem, gambling houses and houses of prostitution, all located in that section of Harlem known as Little Italy."

Gallucci was an imposing man, "a big fellow with a pleasant face and a hearty laugh." He was often seen in Harlem swinging a loaded cane, immaculately dressed in tailored suits with a magnificently waxed mustache, an expensive $2,000 diamond ring and $3,000 diamond shirt studs. He denied the allegations that he was involved in criminal activities. "My enemies say that I am the head of the 'Black Hand' business, that I run the blackmail bomb business and that I own all the lotteries," Gallucci complained a week before he was killed. "They are wrong. I own bakeries, ice and wood shops, shoe shining and repair shops and similar places, but I am not king of the 'Black Hand'." Due to his political influence, he was also called "King of Little Italy" or "The Boss".

== Political influence ==
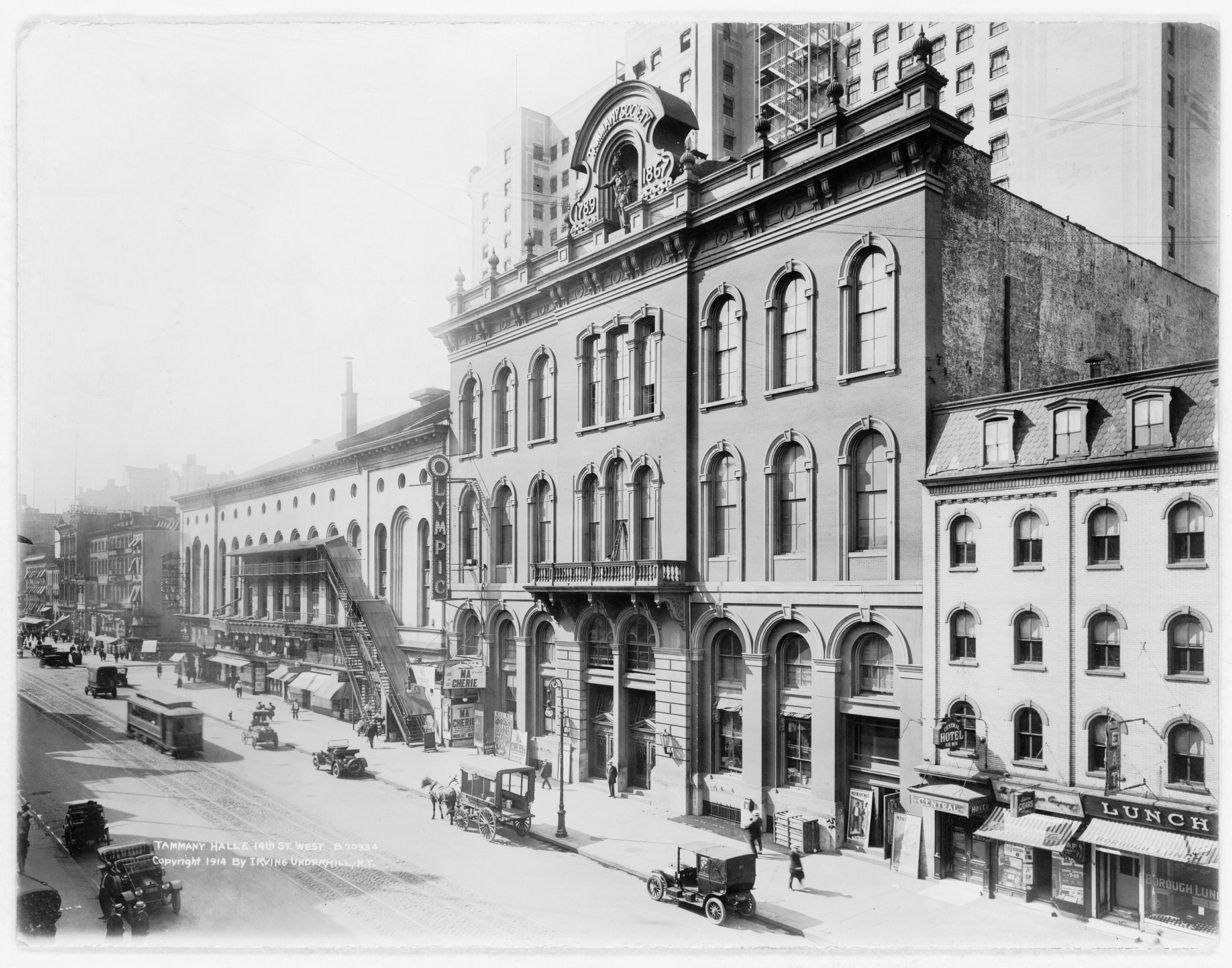
Tammany Hall in 1914

He gained near immunity from law enforcement by allying with the Tammany Hall, the Democratic political machine that ruled Manhattan and New York City politics virtually unopposed. The political patronage of Tammany Hall controlled the city's police and bureaucracy that handed out the construction contracts and licenses. With his ability to mobilize the vote in Harlem and register immigrants, he delivered a significant number of ballots. According to the New York Herald, he was "certainly the most powerful Italian politically in the city, and during campaigns was exceptionally active." His political connections allowed for "a certain measure of immunity from police interference."

According to Salvatore Cotillo, who would become the first Italian-born Justice of the New York Supreme Court and who grew up in Italian Harlem, "to Gallucci all people were either hirelings or payers of tribute. It was a matter of concern in the neighborhood if you were looked down upon by Gallucci." According to Cotillo's biographer, Gallucci boasted that situations could be arranged with the police, that murder could be contracted out and stories circulated that witnesses disappeared. When Gallucci was arrested for carrying concealed weapons, Cotillo was asked to testify as a character witness on his behalf, but refused. In doing so, the Neapolitan-born Cotillo distanced himself from the local underworld that tried to offer him their "services".

The Italian consul in New York from 1895 to 1905, Giovanni Branchi, painted a bleak picture of the situation of the Italian immigrant community at the time:

At that time we had certainly 250,000 to 300,000 Italians within the limits of Greater New York. Whole parts of the town, whole streets, were inhabited by Italians only, with their shops, cafes, etc. All these places were virtually without police supervision with the exception of the regular Irish policeman at the corner of the street, who did not care a rap what Italians did among themselves so long as they did not interfere with other people and as long as they voted the regular (Tammany) ticket. At that time there were on the force only two or three policemen who spoke or understood Italian, and the man who directed any detective or police operations among Italians (an excellent man, by the by) was only a sergeant. He many times told me that he had so many cases, so many inquiries, thrown on his hands that he could not possibly attend to half of them. As to other authorities, they did not trouble themselves at all about it, so much so that in nine cases out of ten any Italian committing a crime was nearly sure of going unpunished if he only escaped a few days from arrest.

Under these circumstances Gallucci could easily deny the charges against him. "I have been accused of being interested in horse thieves, blackmailing, extortion from shop keepers, bomb explosions, kidnapping of children and other crimes, including murder," he told a reporter from the New York Herald who claimed to know him. "My enemies are lying. They are jealous of my prosperity. I am blamed for every criminal deed which takes place here, but it is not the truth," he told the Herald reporter. "Many of the murders down here are the results of quarrels among the blackmailers themselves. They gamble, which leads to fighting, and they dispute the division of spoils. If a leader thinks another is trying to become boss, that man is marked for death."

== Death of brother, Gennaro ==
Giosue's elder brother, Gennaro Gallucci, was shot dead on November 14, 1909, in the back room of the family bakery. The assassin entered the bakery and yelled for Gennaro. When he appeared, he was shot and killed immediately. His activities as a collector of protection payments had caught the attention of the authorities earlier, and he had to leave New York City for a while. Gennaro arrived in New York from Italy in December 1908, having escaped from prison after serving 23 years of a life sentence for murdering two men. He lived on East 109th Street with his brother, Giosuè, and sister-in-law, Assunta. Soon after his arrival, the police began receiving complaints about extortion practices, but when the plaintiffs were told that they had to confront him in court, they dropped the charges.

The New York Police captured him on September 20, 1909, while carrying concealed weapons. Immigration officials began efforts to deport him to Italy, but the courts, oblivious of his criminal background, released him with a suspended sentence. His killing two months later might have been connected to Gennaro's blackmailing activities, according to the police. Only a few months before Gallucci's bakery had been assaulted with bullets smashing through the window. Informants claimed that Giosuè had been responsible for the killing of his brother, according to letters sent to the police later.

Giosuè blamed Aniello Prisco, a gangster from Harlem nicknamed "Zopo the Gimp", for the death of his brother. For the next two years there would be frequent clashes and occasional killings between the rivals. Prisco was the head of a Black Hand gang who accused Gallucci of trespassing on his territory.

== Fighting over underworld control ==
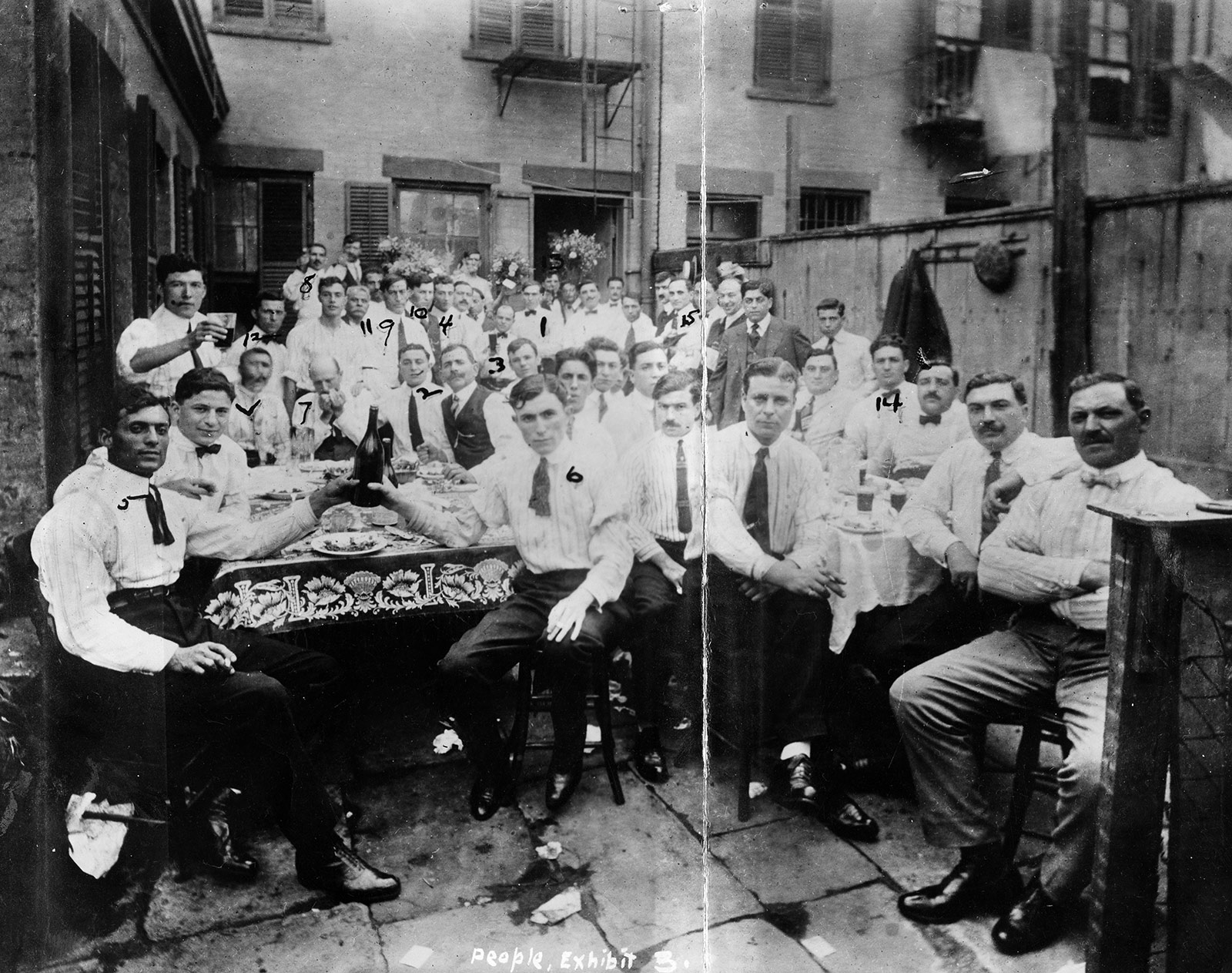
The Navy Street Gang, rivals of Gallucci

A police report from 1917, based on the testimony of the gangster and informer Ralph Daniello, described Gallucci's position around 1912: "At that time Gallucci controlled different gambling games and he would get a percentage on the sale of stolen horses and peddled artichokes. If anybody would not pay this percentage he would either be assaulted, receive blackmail letters or be killed." The report also explained that a Sicilian faction, including three brothers of Giuseppe Morello and his cousins, brothers Fortunato and Tommaso Lomonte, were "working in conjunction with this Galucci, who at all times had been recognized as king."

Despite his power and political clout, Gallucci was not immune from Black Hand extortion. He frequently received Black Hand threats, and was shot at and wounded many times. In 1911, the gang of Neapolitan "black handers" run by Prisco gunned down several members of Gallucci's entourage because he refused to make "protection" payments. On December 15, 1912, Prisco was shot by Gallucci's nephew and bodyguard, John Russomanno, during a meeting at Gallucci's bakery shop. Russomanno was not charged with murder after claiming he fired in self-defense.

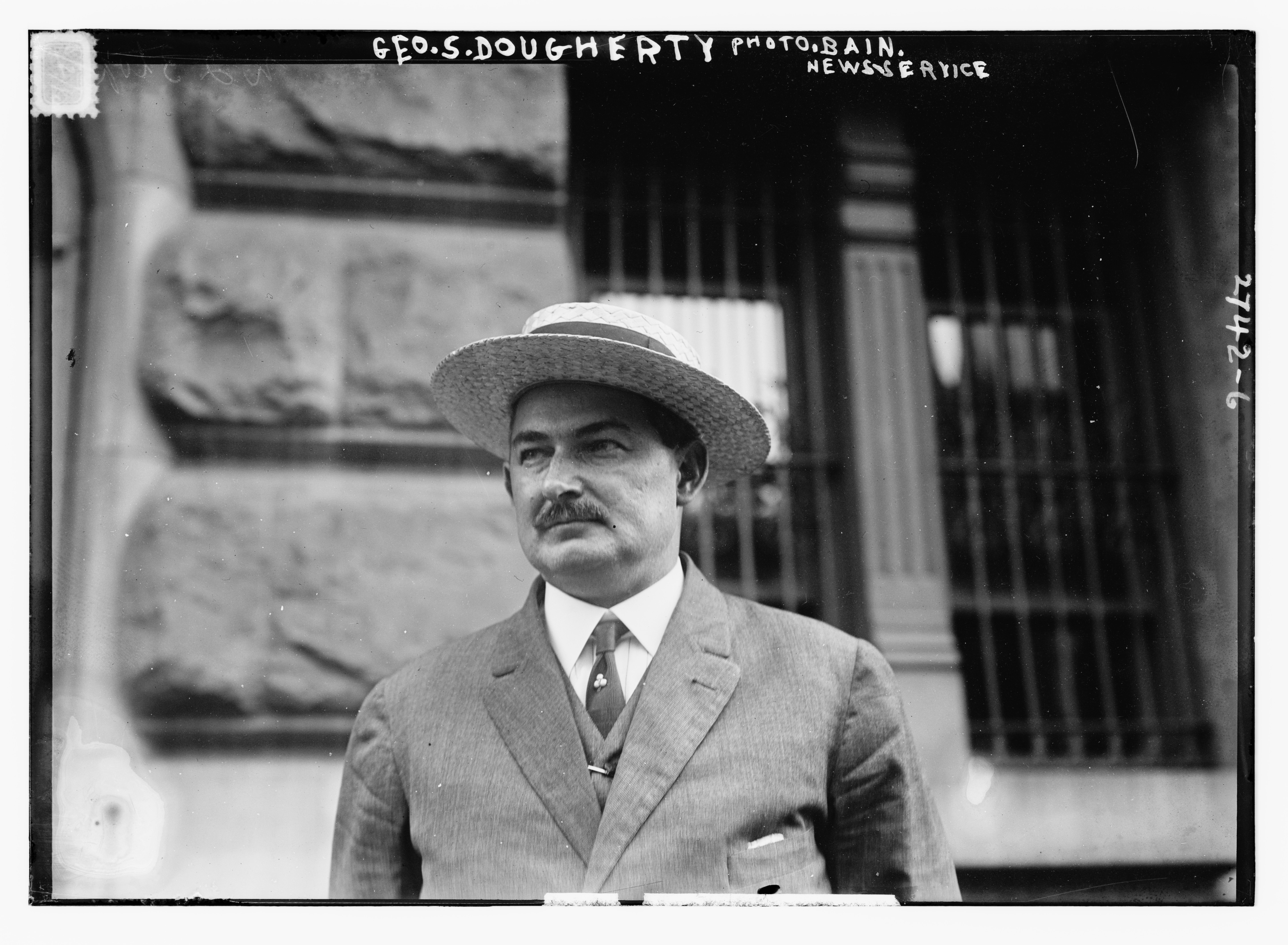
Deputy Police Commissioner Dougherty

At least six "mysterious street murders" and ten shootings followed Prisco's slaying, which, according to some press reports, were the result of a war between the "Russomanno-Gallucci" and "Prisco-Buonomo factions". Gallucci was not only challenged by rival gangsters, but the authorities also closed in responding to the spate of killings, bombings and black-mailings. In July 1913, more than 40 arrests were made, including Gallucci, Russomanno, and Gallucci's bodyguard, Generoso "Joe Chuck" Nazzaro, around Mulberry Bend and in upper Harlem to suppress illegal gambling known as the policy game; a charge led by Assistant District Attorney Deacon Murphy and Deputy Police Commissioner George S. Dougherty.

At the time, the police described him as "the leader of the Italian criminals in Harlem" and that "his consent was necessary before anything out of the way could be done in Harlem's Little Italy." Speculation about the reason behind the arrests was that it could have been an attempt to smash Gallucci's vice ring. He was well known for being involved with prostitution rackets and was also known as the "King of the White Slavers" in the press. He was charged with carrying a concealed weapon, a transgression of the Sullivan Act, but was released on a US$10,000 bail. The case failed to reach court, a fact that many attributed to his political connections.

Gallucci also got into violent disputes with other rival gangs over his control of illegal rackets. The Neapolitan Del Gaudio brothers, who had connections with the Brooklyn based Navy Street gang, were involved in illegal gambling in East Harlem, but Gallucci allegedly denied them permission to operate a lottery. Nicolo Del Gaudio, brother to Gaetano, owned a barber shop on East 104th Street, which had been proposed as a meeting place between Prisco and Gallucci. Nicolo Del Gaudio attempted to kill Gallucci, but failed. Del Gaudio fled from Italian Harlem, but returned in October 1914 and was subsequently killed. The killing was attributed to Gallucci, but no charges were made.

== Murder ==
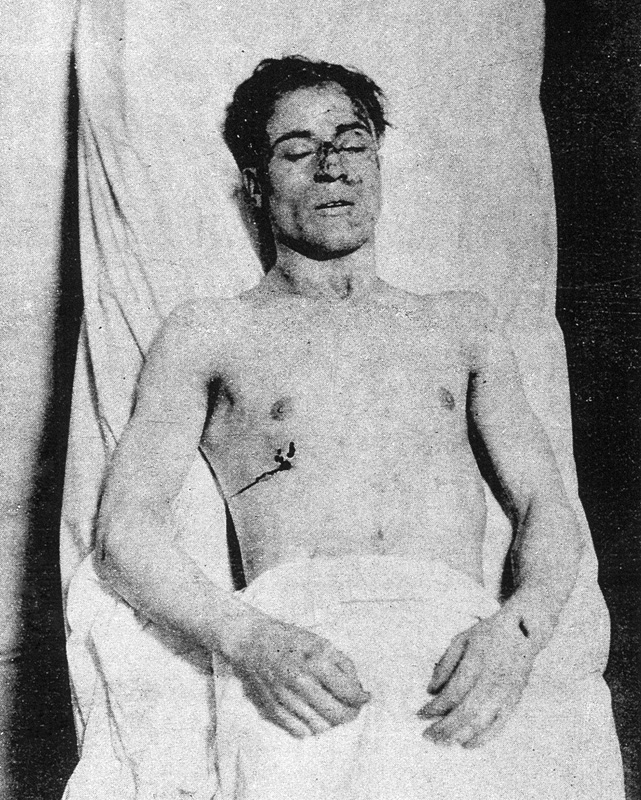
The body of Generoso "Joe Chuck" Nazzaro, the alleged killer of Gallucci, who was killed on March 16, 1917.

With Gallucci's prestige beginning to wither, he scrambled to maintain control as the war continued with the remnants of Prisco's old gang. Rival lotteries began to spring up, challenging his dominance. Only a week before he was killed, Gallucci decided not to employ bodyguards anymore, after the latest in a series had been shot and killed. Being a bodyguard for Gallucci was considered a dangerous career, as ten of them had been killed. The year before, Gallucci was wounded and two of his bodyguards were killed when he tried to make a collection in a shop on First Avenue. At the same time, the Morello gang fell out with Gallucci and formed an alliance with the Camorra gangs from Brooklyn.

Gallucci foresaw his execution a week prior, telling a friend "I know they will get me." He and his 18-year-old son, Luca, were shot on May 17, 1915, in a coffee shop on East 109th Street in Italian Harlem that Gallucci had recently purchased for his son. He was shot through the stomach and neck. While trying to defend Gallucci, his son also was shot through the stomach. Fifteen men, mostly friends of Gallucci's, were in the coffee shop, and some returned fire. The five or six shooters got away, leaping into a waiting escape car around the corner on First Avenue.

His son died the next day in Bellevue Hospital. The funeral was attended by 5,000 people and accompanied by 800 carriages, 22 of which carried flowers alone. The funeral for Gallucci's son was the biggest Harlem had ever experienced up to that time. According to reports, the last carriages were leaving the church in Harlem after the hearse had already arrived at the cemetery in Queens.

Gallucci refused to talk to the police, saying he would settle the issue himself, but he died at Bellevue Hospital three days later, on May 21, of a bullet wound in the abdomen. Gallucci's murder remained unsolved. The alleged killers were Gallucci's former bodyguards Generoso "Joe Chuck" Nazzarro and Tony Romano, with the help of Andrea Ricci, of the rival Navy Street gang from Brooklyn.

The money for the hit was likely provided by Coney Island Camorra boss Pellegrino Morano, in an effort to take over Gallucci's rackets. Nazzaro held a grudge against Gallucci, who failed to pay Nazzaro's bail when he, Gallucci, and Gallucci's nephew, John Russomanno, had been arrested for carrying concealed weapons in July 1913. Nazzarro spent 10 months in prison, but was released a few weeks before the shooting. Gallucci was asked to buy $300 worth of tickets for a racket for Nazarro's benefit, but he flatly refused. A week later, the shooting occurred.

== Burial and aftermath ==
His funeral was closely guarded by police, who feared further gang conflict. Several thousand people filed through Gallucci's apartment to view his body. Around 10,000 people blocked East 109th Street to witness Gallucci's funeral procession, including some 250 police detectives, present due to a rumor that the widow of Gallucci was targeted for murder. The 150 carriages that were expected for the burial procession were reduced to 54 because of fear for hostile demonstrations. The procession was preceded by a 23-man musical band.

Curious bystanders packed the roofs, fire escapes and doorways along the route. Joe Valachi, who became a turncoat against his former Mafia associates in 1963, remembered Gallucci's funeral as "one of the biggest of all the ones I saw around this time." The funeral service was held at the Church of Our Lady of Mount Carmel, located at 113th Street and First Avenue. He was buried in Calvary Cemetery in Queens.

According to the New York Herald, Gallucci was "perhaps the most influential and wealthiest Italians in the country". The Herald wrote that at the time of his death, he held $350,000 in real estate and was a millionaire. In reality, Gallucci left behind only $3,402 in cash and the property at 318 East 109 Street, which was subsequently rented out. Gallucci's lucrative numbers rackets were left unclaimed, and they soon passed over to the Sicilian Morello gang, while the Camorra gangs took control in Brooklyn. The subsequent fight over those rackets with the Camorra gangs from Brooklyn is known as the Mafia–Camorra War, and eventually elevated Vincenzo and Ciro Terranova to "boss" status in the Harlem underworld.

== Sources ==
- Cimino, Al (2015). The Mafia: Corruption, Violence and Degradation. London: Arcturus. ISBN 978-1-78404-865-5.
- Critchley, David (2009). The Origin of Organized Crime in America: The New York City Mafia, 1891-1931. New York: Routledge. ISBN 978-0-415-99030-1.
- Dash, Mike (2009). The First Family: Terror, Extortion, Revenge, Murder, and the Birth of the American Mafia. New York: Random House. ISBN 978-1-4000-6722-0.
- Downey, Patrick (2004). Gangster City: The History of the New York Underworld, 1900-1935. Fort Lee (NJ): Barricade Books. ISBN 978-1-56980-361-5.
- Ferber, Nat Joseph (1938). A New American. From the Life Story of Salvatore A. Cotillo, Supreme Court Justice, State of New York. New York: Farrar & Rinehart.
- Gangrule, a database of historic events, family histories and photographs based on research from primary sources including police, federal, court, immigration, business, and prison records.
- Landolfi, Francesco (2022). Politics, Police and Crime in New York During Prohibition: Gotham and the Age of Recklessness, 1920–1933. New York: Routledge. ISBN 978-1-00326-500-9.
- Martone, Eric (2017). Italian Americans: The History and Culture of a People. Santa Barbara (CA): ABC-CLIO. ISBN 978-1-61069-994-5.
- Monnier, Marco (1863). La camorra: notizie storiche raccolte e documentate. Firenze: G. Barbera. (Original version)
- Nelli, Humbert S. (1981). The Business of Crime. Italians and Syndicate Crime in the United States. Chicago: The University of Chicago Press. ISBN 0-226-57132-7. (Originally published in 1976)
- Pitkin, Thomas M.; Cordasco, Francesco (1977). The Black Hand: A Chapter in Ethnic Crime. Totowa (NJ): Littlefield, Adams. ISBN 9780822603337.
- Shaffer, Thomas L. (1991). American Lawyers and Their Communities: Ethics in The Legal Profession. Notre Dame, Ind.: University of Notre Dame Press. ISBN 0-268-00630-X.
- Shaffer, Thomas L.; Shaffer, Mary M. (1988). "Lawyers as Assimilators and Preservers". Mississippi Law Journal. 58 (405).
