= D'Aquila crime family =

Italian-American crime family

D'Aquila crime Family
- Founded by: Salvatore D'Aquila
- Founding location: Little Italy, New York City
- Years active: 1910s-1931
- Territory: Little Italy, Harlem, Brooklyn and The Bronx
- Ethnicity: Sicilian, Neapolitan
- Criminal activities: Racketeering, Extortion, and Murder
- Rivals: Morello crime family

The D'Aquila crime family (Italian pronunciation: [ˈdaːkwila]) was one of the earliest crime families to be established in the United States and New York City. The D'Aquilas were based in Manhattan's Little Italy, originally a crew of the Morello family prior to breaking off and absorbing what was left of the Neapolitan Camorra of Brooklyn. It was a predecessor of the modern-day Gambino crime family.

== History ==
The D'Aquila family traces back to the Morello crime family. Prior to becoming its own family and establishing dominance in the 1920s, it was a crew operated by Ignazio Lupo from Palermo. After Lupo merged his crew with the Morello mob to form the Morello crime family, he became the underboss of the family. He left leadership of the crew to Salvatore D'Aquila who in the 1910s broke off from the Morello family to start his own family after the arrest of the Morello leadership. In 1916 after the Brooklyn Camorra went to war with the Morello family, D'Aquila absorbed what was left of the Brooklyn Camorra to create the D'Aquila crime family.

On October 10, 1928, D'Aquila was shot dead on Avenue A in Manhattan, aged 54. After his murder, D'Aquila's family was taken over by Manfredi "Al" Mineo.
