= Rocco Valenti =

American criminal (1895-1922)

Rocco Valenti (born in 1895, date of death unknown) was a New York City gangster and prominent member of the Camorra in New York during the early 1910s.

He is often confused with contemporary Mafioso Umberto Valenti.

== Mafia–Camorra War ==
Valenti joined the Neapolitan Navy Street Gang in the early 1910s. On July 20, 1916, Valenti and fellow gang member Nick Sassi helped George "Lefty" Esposito, Tom Pagano, and Giuseppe Verizzano escape after murdering Joe DeMarco and Charles Lombardi.

On September 7, 1916, Valenti was arrested in a local pool hall for carrying a concealed weapon. His arrest came several hours after a shootout that resulted in the deaths of Nicholas Morello and Charles Ubriaco. However, Valenti was later released.

On January 26, 1918, Valenti was arrested in Troy, New York and convicted as an accessory in the DeMarco and Lombardi murders. After serving ten months in prison, Valenti was released in November 1918. He also testified for Charles Giordano during his trial in March 1919.

He disappears from the written record at that point, likely having been either murdered, fled the country or taken on a new identity.
