= Alessandro Vollero =

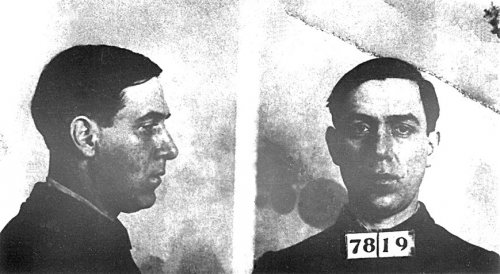
Mug shot of Vollero (1917)

Alessandro Vollero (1889–1959) was a New York mobster and a high-ranking member of the Neapolitan Camorra Navy Street gang in Brooklyn. Vollero served as a lieutenant to gang boss Pellegrino Morano during the Mafia-Camorra War of 1916.

Born in Italy, Vollero emigrated with his family to the United States in 1909 and settled in Brooklyn. He soon became involved with the Camorra-aligned street gangs in that area. Vollero eventually bought a coffee shop on Navy Street in Brooklyn, which became the home of the Navy Street Gang. The Neapolitan gangs were the chief rivals of the Morello crime family, a Sicilian Mafia gang from Manhattan that was trying to expand its territory. The Neapolitan gangs eventually united against the Morello family.

On September 7, 1916, Vollero participated in the murders of mob boss Nicholas Morello and Charles Ubriaco. Vollero wanted revenge against the Morellos for their murder of his friend Nicholas DelGardio. Vollero lured Morello and Ubriaco to his coffee shop on the pretext of arranging a ceasefire with Morano. When they reached the cafe, Morello and Ubriaco were gunned down. Although the murders were successful, the assassins, "Torpedo" Tony Notaro and Ralph Daniello, were eventually apprehended. Daniello agreed to turn state's evidence in exchange for a reduced sentence.

Based on Daniello's testimony, Vollero and Morano were convicted of first degree murder. On June 20, 1918, Vollero was sentenced to death at Sing Sing Prison in Ossining, New York. However, Vollero's sentence was later commuted to life imprisonment. In 1925, during his imprisonment, Vollero became acquainted with Jimmy "The Shiv" DeStefano and his boyhood friend, future mob turncoat Joe Valachi, and served as their mentor. On April 28, 1933, after 14 years in prison, Vollero was released and sent to his birth town, Gragnano, a small town near Naples.
