= Federal Correctional Institution, Atlanta =

United States prison

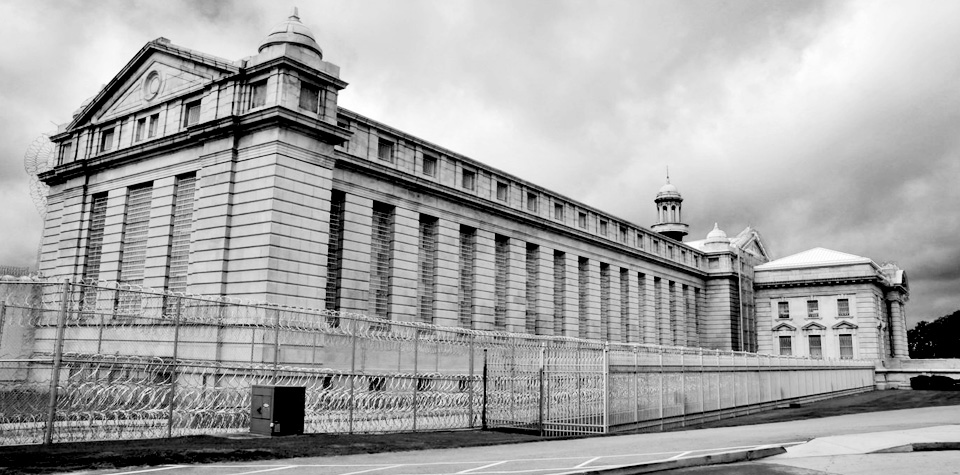
- Interactive map of Federal Correctional Institution, Atlanta
- Location: Atlanta, Georgia; 33°42′40″N 84°22′7″W
- Status: Operational
- Security class: Admin/Low/Minimum/High/Max Low-security FCI with [3+] detention centre[s] (administrative, pre-trial and with additional detention center unit[s]), and also an adjacent minimum security camp for males
- Population: 1,838 (September 2024)
- Opened: 1902
- Managed by: Federal Bureau of Prisons
- Warden: Sylvester Jenkins
- Website: Official website

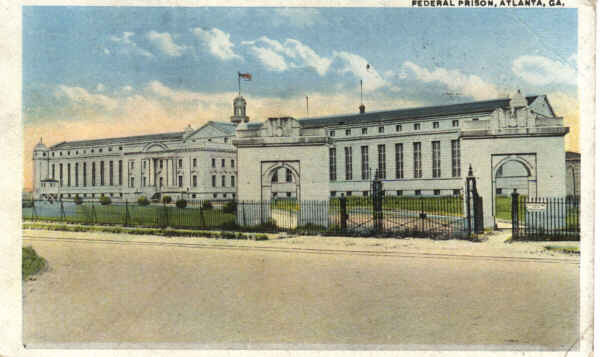
Federal Penitentiary Atlanta 1920 postcard

The Federal Correctional Institution, Atlanta (FCI Atlanta) is a low-security United States federal prison for male inmates in Atlanta, Georgia. It is operated by the Federal Bureau of Prisons, a division of the United States Department of Justice. The facility also has a satellite prison camp for minimum-security male inmates, a detention center for male pretrial inmates (also likely used for inmates serving brief sentences), and also has an additional high and/or maximum security detention center unit[s] (possibly for holdover inmates from former USP, higher risk inmates serving brief sentences and/or inmates from the FCI with behavioural concerns).

== History ==
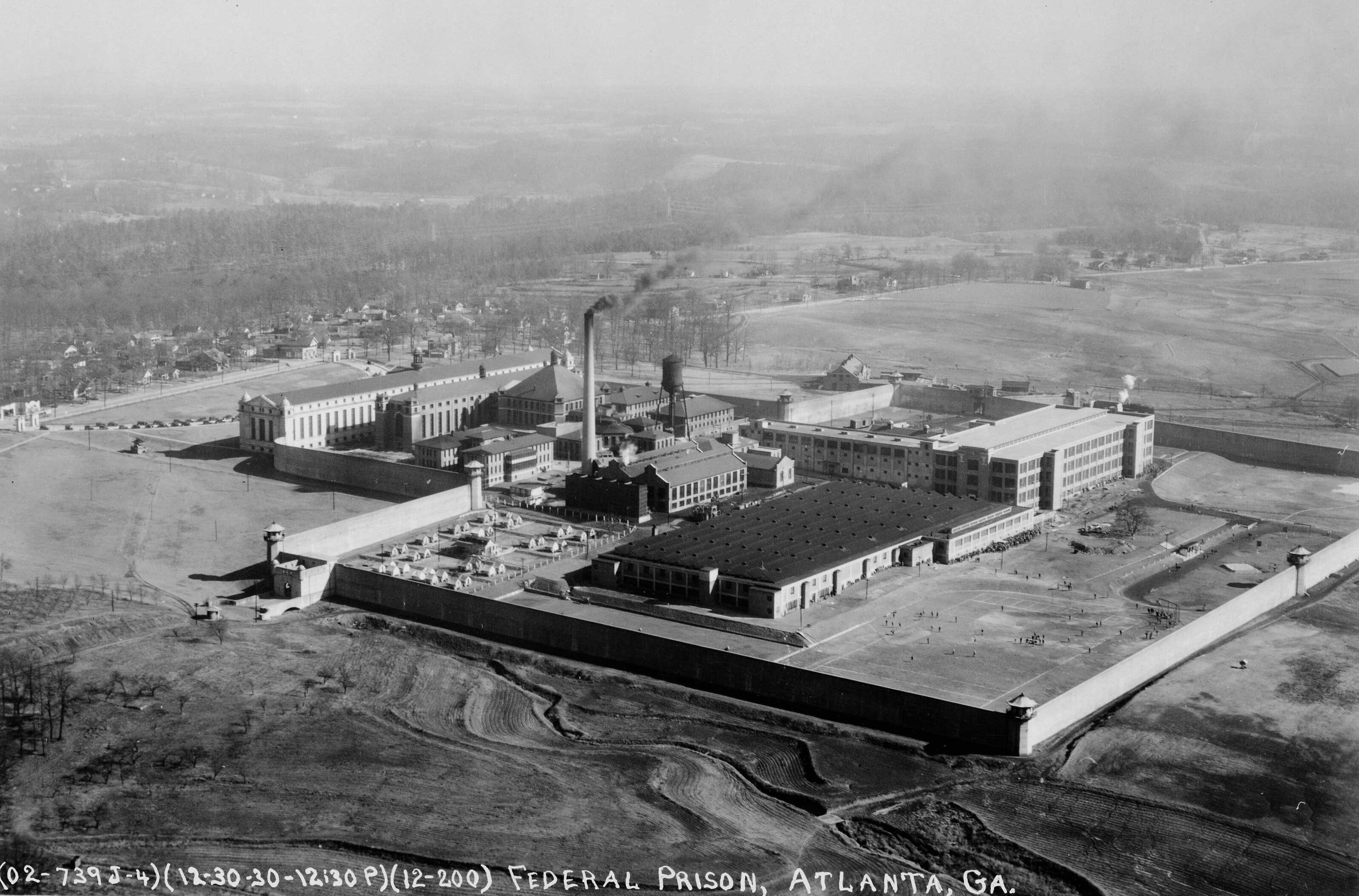
Prison in 1939

In 1899, President William McKinley authorized the construction of a federal prison in Atlanta, Georgia.

Georgia Congressman Leonidas F. Livingston advocated placing the prison in Atlanta. William S. Eames, an architect from St. Louis, Missouri; and United States Attorney General John W. Griggs, on April 18, 1899, traveled to Atlanta to select the prison site.

Construction was completed in January 1902 and the Atlanta Federal Penitentiary opened with the transfer of six convicts from the Sing Sing Correctional Facility in upstate New York. They were the beneficiaries of the Three Prisons Act of 1891, which established penitentiaries in Leavenworth, Kansas; Atlanta, Georgia; and McNeil Island, Washington. The first two remain open today, the third closed in 1976. The Atlanta site was the largest Federal prison, with a capacity of 3,000 inmates. Inmate case files presented "mini-biographies of men confined in the penitentiary. Prison officials recorded every detail of their lives - their medical treatments, their visitors, their letters to and from the outside world"

The main prison building was designed by the St. Louis, Missouri, architect firm of Eames & Young, which also designed the main building at the United States Penitentiary, Leavenworth. It encompassed 300 acres (1.2 km^{2}) and had a capacity of 1200 inmates. The facility was subsequently renamed the United States Penitentiary, Atlanta when US government created the Federal Bureau of Prisons in 1930.

In the 1980s, USP Atlanta was used as a detention center for Cuban refugees from the Mariel boatlift who were ineligible for release into American society.

USP Atlanta was one of several facilities, including the Federal Transfer Center, Oklahoma City, that were used to house prisoners who are being transferred between prisons.

== Notable incidents ==
=== 1987 riots ===
In November 1987, Cuban detainees, tired of indefinite confinement and in constant fear of being deported back to Cuba, rioted for 11 days, staged a bloody riot, seizing dozens of hostages and setting fire to the prison. At least one prisoner was killed. Local hospitals reported admitting a total of eight Cubans suffering gunshot wounds, along with two prison guards who were slightly injured.

== Notable inmates (current and former) ==
*Inmates released from custody prior to 1982 are not listed on the Bureau of Prisons website.

=== Organized crime figures ===
Inmate Name	Register Number	Photo	Status	Details
Giuseppe Morello	Unlisted*		Entered USP Atlanta in 1910, released in 1920	Head of the 107th Street Mob and founder of Morello crime family, the precursor to Genovese family; convicted of counterfeiting but numerous arrests for murder and racketeering. from Mike Dash, The First Family, p. 219-223
Ignazio Lupo	Unlisted*		At USP Atlanta from 1910 to 1920 and from 1936 to 1946.	Founder of the Morello crime family; convicted of counterfeiting in 1910; returned to prison in 1936 for racketeering; suspect in numerous Mafia-related murders.
Whitey Bulger	02182-748		Entered USP Atlanta in 1956; transferred to Alcatraz Federal Penitentiary in 1959.	Former Boss of the Boston Irish Mob crew known as the Winter Hill Gang. Imprisoned in 1956 for bank robbery and truck hijacking. Transferred to Alcatraz in 1959.
Meyer Harris "Mickey" Cohen	Unlisted*		Cohen was transferred from Alcatraz Federal Penitentiary to USP Atlanta in January 1963. He was released in 1972.	Gangster based in Los Angeles and boss of the Cohen crime family. He also had strong ties to the Italian American Mafia from the 1930s through 1960s. On August 14, 1963, fellow inmate Burl Estes McDonald scaled the wall of a secure compound within USP Atlanta, entered an electronics repair training facility and wielding a three-foot iron pipe, snuck up from behind and bludgeoned the unsuspecting Cohen into unconsciousness. Cohen sustained a critical head injury resulting from shards of skull fragments that had to be removed from brain tissue which had hemorrhaged. He underwent extensive neurosurgery and following a two-week coma, doctors inserted a steel plate to replace the mangled bone fragments in the rear skull region.
James Burke	Unlisted*		Released from custody in 1978; served 6 years.	Associate of the Lucchese crime family; convicted in 1972 of extortion with fellow associate Henry Hill; suspected mastermind of the 1978 Lufthansa Heist, in which nearly $6 million in cash and jewels were stolen at JFK Airport; Burke and Hill were portrayed in the 1990 film Goodfellas.
Al Capone	Unlisted*		Transferred to Alcatraz Federal Penitentiary in 1934.	Leader of the Chicago Outfit, which smuggled and bootlegged liquor during Prohibition in the 1920s; convicted of tax evasion in 1931.
Vincent Papa	Unlisted*		Murdered at USP Atlanta in 1977.	Associate of the Lucchese crime family; convicted in 1975 masterminding the theft of heroin seized during the French Connection investigation from the New York City Police Department property office from 1969 to 1972.
Nicodemo Scarfo Sr.	09813–050		Scarfo began his sentence at the Atlanta Federal Penitentiary. He was later transferred to the Federal Medical Center in Butner, North Carolina, where he died of natural causes on January 13, 2017.	Member of the American Mafia who became the boss of the Philadelphia crime family after the deaths of Angelo Bruno and Phil Testa.

=== Fraudsters ===
Inmate Name	Register Number	Photo	Status	Details
Carlo Ponzi	Unlisted*		Released from custody in 1924 after serving 3 years.	Inventor of the financial fraud known as Ponzi scheme; convicted of mail fraud in 1920.
Charles W. Morse	Unlisted*		Pardoned in 1912 after serving 2 years, as he feigned terminal illness.	Imprisoned 1910 for frauds and corrupt business practices. In 1912 Morse drank soapwater with chemicals to appear seriously ill. He managed to be released for medical treatment in Germany, as he claimed to have Bright's disease.

=== Political figures ===
Inmate Name	Register Number	Photo	Status	Details
Eugene V. Debs	9653		Released in 1921 after his sentence was commuted by US President Warren G. Harding.	Founding member of Industrial Workers of the World and US Presidential candidate for the Socialist Party of America; convicted of sedition in 1918 for promoting opposition to the military draft during World War I under both the Espionage Act of 1917 and the Sedition Act of 1918; received over 900,000 votes while incarcerated in 1920.
Vilyam Genrikhovich Fisher	Unlisted*		Released in 1962 as part of a prisoner exchange with the Soviet Union.	Convicted of espionage with relation to the Hollow Nickel Case and sentenced to 45 years' imprisonment
Marcus Garvey	Unlisted*		Released from custody in 1927 after serving 4 years.	Founder of the Universal Negro Improvement Association (UNIA) and leading figure in the Black Nationalist and Pan Africanist movements; convicted of mail fraud in 1923 for promoting the Black Star Line, a UNIA business dedicated to the transportation of goods and eventually throughout the African global economy.
Pedro Albizu Campos	Unlisted*		Transferred to a hospital prison in 1943 and released in 1947 after serving 10 years.	President of the Puerto Rican Nationalist Party from 1930 to 1965; convicted in 1936 of sedition in connection with the assassination of Puerto Rican Police Chief Elisha Riggs, which was in retaliation for the Río Piedras massacre, during which police killed four unarmed party supporters.
Enrique Tarrio	98721-004		Transferred to Federal Correctional Institution, Manchester. Pardoned by President Donald Trump on January 20, 2025.	Convicted of seditious conspiracy and other things in the January 6 United States Capitol attack.

=== Public officials ===
Inmate Name	Register Number	Photo	Status	Details
Ed Norris	41115-037		Released from custody in 2005; served 6 months.	Baltimore Police Commissioner from 2000 to 2002; pleaded guilty in 2004 to misusing police department funds for personal expenses and tax fraud.
George A. Caldwell	Unlisted*		Released from custody in 1941 after serving 1 year and pardoned by US President Harry Truman.	Louisiana General contractor who supervised the construction of 26 public buildings; convicted in 1940 of tax evasion and accepting kickbacks in connection with the Louisiana Hayride scandals in 1939 and 1940.
William Colbeck	Unlisted*		Released in 1940 after serving 16 years.	Politician and organized crime figure in St. Louis; convicted in 1924 of two 1923 armed robberies which netted over $2 million.

=== Others ===
Inmate Name	Register Number	Photo	Status	Details
Roy Gardner	Unlisted*		Served several years of a 75-year sentence at USP Atlanta; attempted to escape in 1926.	Notorious bank robber and escape artist; stole over $350,000 in cash and securities from banks and mail trains in 1920 and 1921.
Willie Aikens	01732-031		Released in 2008; served 14 years.	Former Major League Baseball player; convicted in 1994 of selling crack-cocaine.
Christopher "B.G." Dorsey	31969-034		Released in 2023.	Better known by his stage name B.G. (acronym for Baby Gangsta), is an American rapper from New Orleans, Louisiana. On July 18, 2012, B.G. was sentenced to 14 years in a federal prison for gun possession and witness tampering.
Christopher Jeburk	09029-021		Currently serving a life sentence. Now at USP Allenwood.	Bank robber and former FBI Ten Most Wanted fugitive; kidnapped bank teller Amy Shaw and her family, then escaped from prison twice before he could be sentenced for his crimes. Several weeks into his sentence, he was transferred here from Leavenworth Federal Penitentiary after a prison guard caught him trying to escape a third time by hanging on to a laundry truck before it could reach the front gate.
Larry Lawton	52224-004		Released in 2007; served three years in Atlanta, later transferred to FCI Coleman and others.	Jewel thief and Gambino crime family associate.
Alan Li, MD	07507-506		Serving a 10-year sentence with a scheduled release in 2030, followed by 10 years of supervised release. Currently at FCI Elkton.	Li was a resident emergency medicine physician at Mount Sinai Medical Center when he was arrested and charged by the FBI in May 2022 for attempted child sex trafficking.
Paul Nicholas Miller	32607-509		Was serving a 41-month sentence; released from custody on July 3, 2023.	American far-right political commentator and streamer, known online as 'GypsyCrusader'. Miller is best known for his cosplays of various characters, most notably Joker. Miller was indicted on charges of possessing a firearm as convicted felon and possession of unregistered rifle on February 25, 2021, stemming from an incident that took place in January 2018.
Jim Rivera	Unlisted*		Paroled in 1949; Sentenced to life imprisonment for attempted rape in 1944.	Former Major League Baseball player; In 1944, Rivera was convicted of attempted rape following an incident at Barksdale Field and sentenced to life in prison. After gaining attention for his performance on the prison baseball team, his sentence was reduced, and he was paroled in 1949; he was subsequently signed by the Atlanta Crackers.

== See also ==
- List of U.S. federal prisons
- Federal Bureau of Prisons
- Incarceration in the United States
