= Aniello Prisco =

Italian-American gang leader and extortionist (1880–1912)

- Born: c. 1880; Naples, Kingdom of Italy
- Died: December 16, 1912 (aged 32); New York City, U.S.
- Cause of death: Gunshot wounds
- Organization: Camorra
- Criminal charges: extortion; murder; robbery

Aniello Prisco (Italian pronunciation: [aˈnjɛllo ˈprisko] c. 1880 – December 16, 1912) was an Italian-American gang leader and extortionist. Born in Naples, he immigrated to New York City and operated a Camorra gang, becoming involved in the Black Hand extortion racket, robbery, and murder. Despite his numerous arrests, he was never convicted of any crime. After entering a business belonging to crime boss Giosue Gallucci and demanding a payment of $100, he was shot to death by Gallucci's nephew, John Russomano. Russomano was arrested but released three days later after a jury decided he had acted in self-defense, as Prisco had been threatening Gallucci with a revolver.

== Early life ==
Aniello Prisco was born in Naples around 1880. At some point, he left the Kingdom of Italy and settled at 2133 First Avenue in the East Harlem section of New York. He received the nickname "Zopo (lit. 'lame') the Gimp" due to his hobble, which was purportedly caused by a bullet wound to the leg which he received following a confrontation in Long Island.

== Criminal career ==
Prisco operated a Camorra gang based mainly out of the nearby Brooklyn borough; frequently, there was conflict between him and crime boss Giosue Gallucci. Prisco was heavily involved in the Black Hand extortion racket and was known as the "King of the Black Hand" and "one of the most dangerous Italian outlaws in [New York]". He gained a reputation for the robbery and blackmailing of Italian business owners.

Giosue Gallucci blamed Prisco for the murder of his brother, Genaro, which occurred on November 14, 1909. After a woman named Nellie Lenere stabbed gangster Frank Monaco to death on October 29, 1911, her mother, Pasquarella Spinelli, was shot to death; Prisco was implicated in the crime and arrested in June 1912, but was not convicted. He was also arrested in connection with the murders of Harlem gangster Antonio Zaraca and Giuseppe Jacco in September 1912. He was arrested at least three times for carrying concealed weapons, and less than three weeks before his death, he was arrested for robbery. Despite his many arrests, he was never convicted of any crime.

== Death ==
On the morning of December 16, 1912, Prisco entered Giosue Gallucci's coffee shop located at 318 East 109th Street in the Manhattan borough of New York, the same shop in which Genaro Gallucci had been murdered three years prior, and demanded a payment of $100 while holding Gallucci at gunpoint with a .38 caliber revolver. John Russomano, Gallucci's nephew and bodyguard, retrieved a revolver and shot Prisco in the head, killing him. The occupants of the coffee shop then scattered, except for waiter Michael Morelles, who claimed to be ignorant of what had occurred. Policeman George L. Smith, who had been posted a block away, heard the shots and arrived at the scene first, finding Prisco dead. Russomano surrendered to the police and was held on a $5,000 bail; Gallucci and Morelles were both held as witnesses. Three days after Prisco's killing, Russomano was released after a jury decided that he had acted in self-defense.
