= Ciro Terranova =

Italian-American mobster

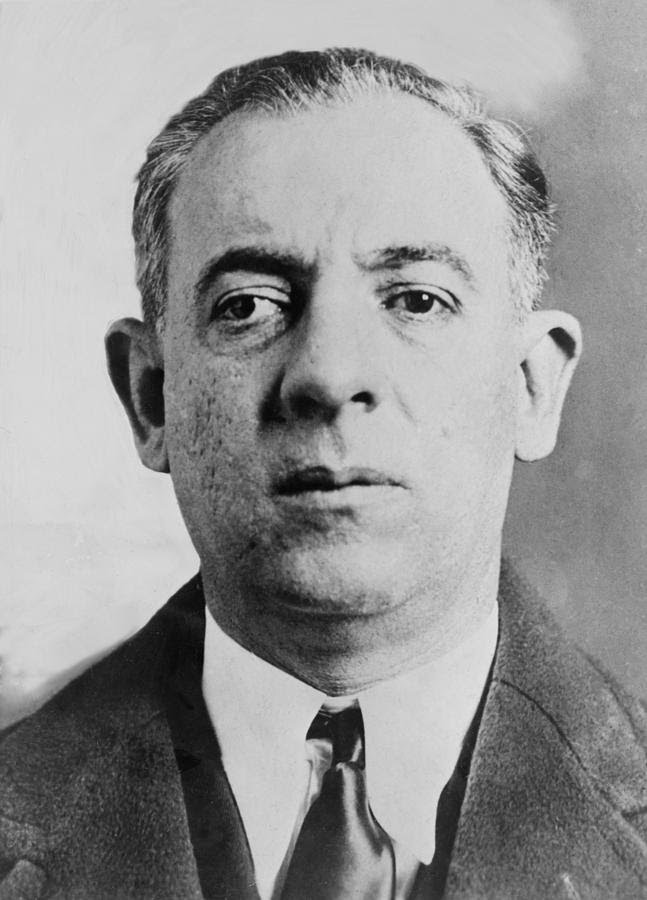
- New York City Police Department mugshot of Terranova
- Born: July 20, 1888; Corleone, Sicily, Italy
- Died: February 20, 1938 (age 49); New York, New York, U.S.
- Other name: "The Artichoke King"
- Occupation: Gangster

Ciro Terranova (Italian pronunciation: [ˈtʃiːro ˌtɛrraˈnɔːva]; July 20, 1888 − February 20, 1938) was a Sicilian-born American gangster in New York City, and one time underboss of the Morello crime family.

== Early life ==
Terranova was born in the town of Corleone, Sicily. In 1893, Ciro moved to New York with his father, mother, four sisters, brothers Vincenzo and Nicolo to meet half brother Giuseppe Morello, who had emigrated six months earlier. Years later, Ciro, Vincenzo, Nicolo, and Giuseppe would found the powerful Morello crime family.

Due to lack of work in the New York area, Terranova and his family only stayed there for about a year. They eventually traveled to Louisiana, where the father planted sugar cane, then moved to Bryan, Texas, where they worked as cotton pickers. After two years in Texas, malaria struck the family. They moved back to New York in 1896.

== Return to New York ==
Ciro and Vincent went to school and worked at the family business, a plastering store, on evenings and weekends. Ciro later worked as a waiter at a restaurant owned by his stepbrother Giuseppe, at the rear of the Prince Street Saloon. In 1903, Giuseppe was charged with the barrel murders but released due to lack of evidence. After the trials ended in June 1903, the Morello crime family continued to deal with police searches and harassment. On one such occasion Ciro, Vincent, and his nephews Charlie and Nick Sylvester were arrested and held overnight. Another time, Ciro was arrested while trying to find a doctor for Charlie.

== Rise to power ==
When Ignazio "the Wolf" Lupo and Ciro's brother Giuseppe were sent to prison on counterfeiting charges, Ciro, Vincent, and Nick filled the power vacuum. They soon rose to be the top gangsters of Italian Harlem, running the Morello family.

Ciro earned his nickname, "the Artichoke King", by purchasing all the artichokes that came into New York and selling them for roughly three times as much.

=== DiMarco murder ===
In 1916, Joe DiMarco, a gambling joint operator, challenged the power of Ciro and the Morellos. The Morellos then conspired with the Navy Street Gang to kill DiMarco and gave the job to Leo Lauritano, the Navy Street leader. Lauritano in turn passed the job on to Mike Fetto.

Accounts differ as to what happened next. In one narrative Fetto went to DiMarco's club to kill him but could not identify DiMarco and returned without finishing the job, which was then given to John "Jonny Left" Esposito, with Fetto as his assistant. Esposito likewise could not find Dimarco, so he killed Charles Lombardi instead. Fetto eventually caught up with DiMarco and murdered him.

In another account of the Mafia-Camorra War, Fetto shot Lombardi thinking he was DiMarco. A third Morello associate in the room, Giuseppe Verrizano, ended up killing DiMarco.

== Change in power ==
After the DiMarco murder, the police arrested hitman John Esposito. Esposito then implicated Ciro, who was indicted on the two murders. However, the charges against Ciro were soon dropped. The reason was that the testimony against Ciro was given by co-conspirators and accomplices and under New York law outside corroboration was necessary. Two weeks after the DiMarco hit, but before his arrest, Esposito was ordered to kill Charles Ubriaco and Ciro's half-brother Nicholas, who were discussing peace terms with rival gang members.

By 1920 the Morello-Terranova-Lupo rule was being challenged by Giuseppe "Joe the Boss" Masseria, an up-and-coming gangster. Vincent Morello was murdered on East 116 St. A powerful ally of the Morello Family, Umberto "Rocco" Valenti, was killed by Charles "Lucky" Luciano, then a member of the Masseria family. After Valenti's death, many of Ciro's men switched sides to Masseria. Even Peter Morello switched sides and became one of Masseria's most trusted lieutenants, even though the Masseria gang had killed his brother. When the dust settled, Ciro controlled the 116th Street Crew in Upper Manhattan and Masseria ruled the Bronx.

== Castellammarese War ==
While the Castellammarese War was going on, Joe Valachi tried to patch up his friendship with Ciro and even befriended Ciro's driver. Tommy Gagliano (who later became boss of the Lucchese crime family) then asked Valachi to take his side in the gang war.

Valachi's first assignment was to kill Ciro's driver; instead, Valachi killed Ciro's nephew, Joseph Catania. At Catania's funeral, Terranova swore revenge. Valachi also claimed to have killed Peter Morello, Ciro's half brother, but Lucky Luciano said that Albert Anastasia and Frank Scalise killed Morello.

During the early 1930s, New York mayor Fiorello LaGuardia led a successful effort to decriminalize the artichoke trade, destroying Terranova's power base. By the time of his death, Terranova was reportedly impoverished.

== Death ==
On February 18, 1938, Ciro Terranova suffered a paralyzing stroke. He died two days later at Columbus Hospital, at age 49, with his son and wife at his side. Ciro was the only one of the four Terranova brothers to die in bed. Ciro and his three brothers lie in bare graves in Calvary Cemetery in Queens, New York, not far from Joe Petrosino, who investigated them, or other Morello crime family members, such as Ignazio "Lupo the Wolf" Lupo.

== In popular fiction ==
- In the television series The Untouchables, Terranova is portrayed by Jack Weston.

American Mafia
Preceded by Vincenzo Terranova	Morello crime family Underboss; 1916-1920	Succeeded by Vincenzo Terranova
