= Pellegrino Morano =

American gangster

Pellegrino Morano (1877–unknown) was the head of a group of Italian criminals with roots in the Camorra based in Coney Island, where he owned the Santa Lucia restaurant, which was often used as the headquarters for their gang, known as the Coney Island gang. He is also known as Marano.

== Coney Island gang ==
Morano was born in 1877 in Prata in the province of Avellino in the Italian region of Campania. According to immigration documents he entered the U.S. twice, once in 1892 and permanently in 1912. The first time he came to the United States, Morano, a professional barber, arrived on 1 June 1892 on the Chandernagor coming from the port of Naples, with his father Giuseppe (46, laborer) and his two-years younger brother Francesco. The family settled in New York, where a large community from Avellino already lived.

He settled in Italian Harlem and started to sell stolen horses to make a living. In August 1904, he was arrested for the shooting of an Italian "well known to the police" at Mulberry and Grand Streets in front of the Italian bank of Stabile Brothers. At the time he gave his address as 327 E. 115th Street. The police believed his claim of innocence, but he was confined and charged with carrying a concealed weapon.

Years later, Morano moved to Brooklyn where his associates Alessandro Vollero and Leopoldo Lauritano owned a coffee house at 133 Navy Street. The coffee house was used as the headquarters for their gang, which mainly consisted of Neapolitans, and was often referred to as 'The Camorra'. Morano opened the Santa Lucia restaurant close to the Coney Island amusement parks, from where his gang, including his right-hand men Tony Parretti, made money in gambling and cocaine dealing. Morano was considered to be the boss, with Parretti as his "underboss", from whom others took "direct orders". However, the gang was not a tightly led organization, but a rather loose association where everybody worked for himself, although Morano was one of the leaders that initiated recruits as camorristi.

== Mafia Camorra war ==
Morano wanted to expand his business to the lucrative numbers rackets in Italian Harlem under control of Giosuè Gallucci, the 'King of Little Italy'. Gallucci was killed in May 1915. The money for the hit was provided by Morano. The lucrative numbers rackets left behind by Gallucci were now free for the taking, and they soon became the subject of a bloody fight, known as the Mafia-Camorra War, between Camorra gangs from Brooklyn and the Sicilian Morello gang.

On June 24, 1916, a meeting took place at Coney Island between the Sicilian Morello gang, the Neapolitan Navy Street gang and the Neapolitan Coney Island gang. The purpose of the meeting was to discuss the expansion of gambling in lower Manhattan. After eliminating their common enemies – in particular Joe De Marco, who ran a restaurant and several gambling establishments on Mulberry Street in Lower Manhattan – the Neapolitans went after the Sicilians.

For several months in 1916, Morano ran a numbers game in Harlem, the territory of the Morello gang, but the returns were not sufficient to cover the tribute that the Morellos demanded. Morano paid the Morello's $25 a week for the running the game, but stopped paying and the Morello's withdrew Morano's control over the game, despite mediation by Morello associate Charles Ubriaco. As result, Morano would target the Morello's in revenge.

The Neopolitans believed they also could take over other Harlem rackets, such as the artichoke monopoly, the coal and ice business, and the lucrative zicchinetta card games, if they could eliminate the Morellos.

== Murder and conviction ==
Apparently Morano came up with the idea of killing the Morellos, in which he was encouraged by Vollero. On September 7, 1916, Morello gang member Nicholas Terranova and Charles Ubriaco were lured in a trap while being invited to a chat with Morano and Navy Street gang boss Lauritano. Terranova and Ubriaco were shot and killed. Subsequently, they went after other East Harlem gang leaders, killing Giuseppe Verrazano, but were unable to reach the Morellos, who stayed close to their house in East 116th Street.

The Neapolitans did not fear police investigations because they paid off police officers and the omertà code of silence prevented witnesses from testifying. However, in May 1917, Ralph Daniello, aka 'The Barber', a member of the Navy Street gang who had been present at the meetings to decide on the murders, began to tell the police about Morano, the Neapolitan gangs and the recent murders.

On May 15, 1918, Morano was convicted of murder in the second degree in the case of Terranova and Ubriaco and sentenced to twenty years to life at Sing Sing prison. His associate Vollero received a death sentence, which was later reduced to a minimum of 20 years.

The last time Morano came into the limelight was during the trial of his former right-hand man Antonio Paretti in July 1926. Despite being in prison for seven years, he refused to testify against his associate. "I won't talk, I don't know anybody," he told the court before he was returned to his prison cell.
