= Mafia–Camorra War =

New York City gang war during 1915–1917

Date	1915-1917
Location	New York City
Result	Mafia victory

Belligerents
American Mafia: Morello crime family	American Camorra gangs: Navy Street Gang, Coney Island Gang

The Mafia–Camorra War was a gang war in New York City that lasted from 1915 to 1917. On one side was the originally Sicilian Morello crime family of Manhattan; on the other were gangs originally from Naples and the surrounding Campania region, based in Navy Street in Brooklyn and Coney Island, referred to as the Camorra. The fight over the control of the New York rackets started after the killing of Giosue Gallucci, the undisputed King of Little Italy, and his son on May 17, 1915. The trials that followed in 1918 completely smashed the Camorra gangs; the testimonies of their men demolished the protection they enjoyed. It was the end of the Camorra in New York and the rise in power of American-based Sicilian Mafia groups.

== Protagonists ==
The Morello gang was formerly run by Giuseppe Morello until 1909 and then by his half-brothers, the Terranovas, Vincenzo, Ciro, and Nicholas Morello. Vincenzo and Nicola occasionally used their older half-brother's name, Morello, even though they were legally Terranovas. They controlled Harlem and most of northern Manhattan. Morello and his allies were part of the traditional Sicilian Mafia.

The Camorra organization, run by Andrea Ricci, was a powerful underworld force in Brooklyn. Unlike the Mafia, the Camorra recruited immigrants from the Naples region of Italy. The Camorra organization's close allies included the Navy Street and Coney Island gangs of Brooklyn, both Neapolitan in origin. Leopoldo Lauritano and Alessandro Vollero headed the Navy Street Gang, and Pellegrino Morano was the boss of the Coney Island Gang.

Before this conflict started, relations between the two sides were relatively amicable; in fact, each year, the Morellos attended a 'smoker' held by Camorra boss Ricci in Brooklyn. However, things were soon to change.

== Morello power play ==
As with many gang conflicts, the Mafia-Camorra war started due to greed - in this case, Morello's ambition to control gambling in Manhattan. The Morellos' first target were the Del Gaudio brothers, who controlled gambling operations in East Harlem. The Morellos killed Nicolo Del Gaudio and cowed his brother Gaetano.

Their next target, Joseph DeMarco, would be much harder to subdue. DeMarco ran a restaurant and several gambling establishments on Mulberry Street in Lower Manhattan. Having faced the Morellos before, DeMarco had survived two assassination attempts and had unsuccessfully tried to murder Nicholas Morello on one occasion. The Morello family sought help from the Navy Street and Coney Island gangs to subdue DeMarco.

== The Morello plot ==
On June 24, 1916, the Morellos met with the Navy Street and Coney Island gangs in Coney Island. The reason for the meeting was to parcel out control of all illegal activities in New York, including gambling, drugs, and extortion. At the meeting, Nick Morello and his associate, Steve LaSalle, proposed killing DeMarco. The two Brooklyn gangs agreed, and Lauritano, the Navy Street boss, set up a meeting at his Brooklyn Cafe to plan the hit.

Nick Morello and his associates Steve LaSalle, Ciro "The Artichoke King" Terranova, and Giuseppe Verizzano met the Brooklyn gang members at Lauritano's cafe three weeks later. The main problem in staging an attack on DeMarco was that he knew all the Morellos and wouldn't let them get near him. However, Verizzano was a close friend of DeMarco's; he was, therefore, assigned to set up the trap. The plan was for Verizzano to smuggle a Navy Street hitman into DeMarco's gambling den and point out DeMarco to the assassin, who would then kill him.

== The DeMarco hit ==
The first attempt at killing DeMarco failed when Navy Street hitman John Fetto arrived late at the gambling den; by that point, DeMarco had left. Complicating the planning for a second attempt, the conspirators discovered that a friend of DeMarco, Joe "Chuck" Nazzaro, would accompany DeMarco that afternoon. John Esposito was added to the hit team to increase their chance of success. That afternoon, Esposito and Fetto made their way to a saloon on Elizabeth Street to await a signal from Verizzano. At around five o'clock, Verizzano arrived at the saloon and notified the gunmen that DeMarco had arrived at the gambling den. Verizzano and the two hitmen left the saloon and made their way to the entrance of the gambling den.

Verizzano, Esposito, and Fetto arrived at the entrance to DeMarco's gambling hall. Nick Sassi, a DeMarco employee who was a Navy Street sympathizer, got the three men past the doorman and inside the hall. The men walked to the back bedroom where the card games were going on. Inside the back room, DeMarco, Charles Lombardi, other gangsters, and numerous spectators were watching the card game. Verizzano sat down opposite DeMarco to identify the target for Esposito and Fetto. Outside the room, Sassi and Rocco Valente from Navy Street watched to ensure everyone had a clear escape route.

Suddenly, Esposito pulled out his gun and fatally shot Lombardi; the nervous gunman had misread the signals from Verizzano and thought he was shooting DeMarco. Working quickly, Verizzano managed to kill DeMarco himself. The Navy Street gunmen then crawled out the bedroom window onto Oliver Street and safely made their escape. That evening, Nick and Vincent Morello, LaSalle, Terranova, and Verizzano traveled to the Navy Street Gang headquarters. They advised Lauritano that Joe DeMarco was indeed dead; they gave Lauritano $50 (equivalent to $1,479 in 2025) to pass on to his gunmen.

== The Camorra plot ==
With Joe DeMarco's death, the Morello organization was able to open up Lower Manhattan to its gambling operations. However, to Morello's chagrin, the Camorra organization also grabbed the opportunity and opened a couple of its gambling houses in Lower Manhattan. Since Morello's goal had been a monopoly on gambling in the area, the stage was set for conflict.

On the other side of the East River, the Neapolitan gangs were also getting ambitious. Alessandro Vollero, a top Navy Street leader, had never been happy with cooperating with the Morellos on the DeMarco hit. He now decided to break their alliance. A meeting was held in Philadelphia between Navy Gang representatives and the Camorra leadership about hitting the Morellos and taking complete control of Manhattan. After discussing it with Camorra boss Ricci, the two groups agreed to form an alliance.

The Navy Gang and the Camorra developed a plan to lure the leaders of the Morello gang to another meeting in Brooklyn, only to ambush and murder them.

== The Morello hit ==
On September 7, 1916, Nicholas Morello and Charles Ubriaco were lured into a trap while being invited to a chat with Morano and Navy Street gang boss Lauritano. Terranova and Ubriaco were shot and killed. Subsequently, they went after other East Harlem gang leaders, killing Giuseppe Verrazano at Joseph Conti's Italian Gardens Restaurant at 341 Broome Street on October 6, 1916, but were unable to reach the Morellos, who stayed close to their house in East 116th Street.

The Neapolitans did not fear police investigations because they paid off police officers and omertà prevented witnesses from stepping forward. However, in May 1917, Ralph Daniello, aka 'The Barber,' a member of the Navy Street gang who had been present at the meetings to decide on the murders, began to tell the police everything he knew about Morano, the Neapolitan gangs, and the recent murders.

== Destruction of the Camorra ==
Giuseppe Verrazano, who was with the Morello gang, wanted to open another gambling house; the Navy Street gang did not like this, so a plot to kill him was hatched. Verrazano spotted a Navy Street member and tried to kill him, but he was spotted and forced to flee. Many assassinations and attempts happened after this, making neither side safe. Since the Camorra could not kill the new leaders, their plot for destruction would have to be executed indirectly. The Camorra tried to wrest the artichoke business from Ciro Terronova. Their threats failed not only against artichokes but also against coal, ice, and other markets.

Members killed in this war included Salvatore DeMarco, George Esposito, Gaetano Del Gaudio, Antonio 'Tony the Shoemaker' Parretti, and Joseph 'Chuck' Nazzaro. The man who played the biggest part in the victory of the mafia was Ralph 'The Barber' Daniello, who testified against Navy Street's activities, from murders to rackets, leading to numerous convictions and indictments. The Camorra boss Andrea Ricci was shot dead in November 1917, allegedly by his men, as they were afraid he could testify.

== Trials ==
Rocco Valenti was arrested in January for participation in the DeMarco / Lombardi killing. He was jailed for ten months before being discharged in November 1918. He appeared later in court to testify against Charles Giordano in March 1919. Alessandro Vollero was tried for first degree murder in the case of Nicholas Morello and Charles Ubriaco. Ralph Daniello testified against Vollero and stated the gang paid money to a detective named Michael Mealli. Mealli was reduced in rank and assigned to patrol duty.

Following this, Judge Kapper was taken ill on February 18, causing a mistrial declaration. Vollero was retried on March 4 and was sentenced to life at Sing Sing. Pellegrino Morano, leader of the Coney Island faction, was convicted of murder in the second degree. He was sentenced to 20 years to life imprisonment at Sing Sing. Alphonso Sgroia, a Navy Street gang member, was sentenced on June 17, 1918, he received twelve years in Dannemora for the Nick Morello case. Sgroia testified against his fellow assailants and received a shorter prison sentence and deportation to Italy. Justice for Morello's and Ubriaco's death did not stop there.

John Esposito and Antonio Notaro were sentenced in June 1918 from 6 to 10 years each for their participation in the murder. Ciro Terranova was tried for Complicity in June 1918 in connection with the DeMarco/Lombardi killing. Johnny Esposito, the killer of Lombardi, tried to testify against Terranova, but once it was proved that they were in the same gang, Ciro was acquitted due to lack of corroboration. Ralph Daniello's sentence was suspended due to the testimony he had given. An assault which cost him five years in Coney Island cut short his freedom. After his release in 1925, he was found shot near Metuchen, New Jersey.

Frank Fevrola was found guilty by Judge Tompkins for the murder of "Chuck" Nazzaro in 1917. Fevrola was sentenced to death at Sing Sing, the testimony having been given by someone who may have been closer to him than anyone, his wife. However, on April 14, 1922, notice was served on DA Weeks that a motion would be made to grant a retrial on the case of Fevrola. His wife withdrew all previous statements, the explanation being that the police had threatened and bribed her to testify. The retrial was opposed by mocking Tessie Fevrola's affidavit. Tompkins denied any form of retrial for Fevrola. Lawyer Thomas O'Neil made a last-minute attempt to save Fevrola on May 29, 1923. With seven hours till execution, Tompkins was granted a retrial, sparing him until October 7. His death sentence was eventually commuted.

Tony Parretti received a death sentence for his part in the killing of Nicholas Morello and Charles Ubriaco on September 7, 1916. Both were also involved in the murder of Joe Nazzaro. Leading to his execution, security in Sing Sing prison was enhanced from 16 hours a day to 24 hours a day. He was pressuring politicians to deny the death penalty, but this was not granted. He was electrocuted on February 17, 1927, at the age of 35.

== Members of each faction ==
Mafia - Giuseppe Morello (imprisoned in 1909 for counterfeiting), Ignazio Lupo (imprisoned in 1909 for counterfeiting), Vincenzo Terranova (eldest brother), Ciro Terranova (middle brother), Nicolo Terranova (youngest brother - murdered in 1916), Charles Ubriaco (murdered in 1916), Thomas Lomonte, Fortunato Lomonte.

Camorra - Pellegrino Morano (Coney Island boss), Alessandro Vollero (Navy Street gang leader), Ralph Daniello (became an informant), Leopoldo Lauritano, Alfonso Sgroia, Frank Fevrola, Antonio Parretti, Rocco Valenti, Silva Tagliagamba, Aniello Parretti, Johnny Esposito.

Other - Giuseppe DeMarco, Generoso Nazzaro

== Bibliography ==
- Nelli, Humbert S. (1981). The Business of Crime. Italians and Syndicate Crime in the United States, Chicago: The University of Chicago Press ISBN 0-226-57132-7 (Originally published in 1976)
