= Morello crime family =

Now-defunct Mafia syndicate

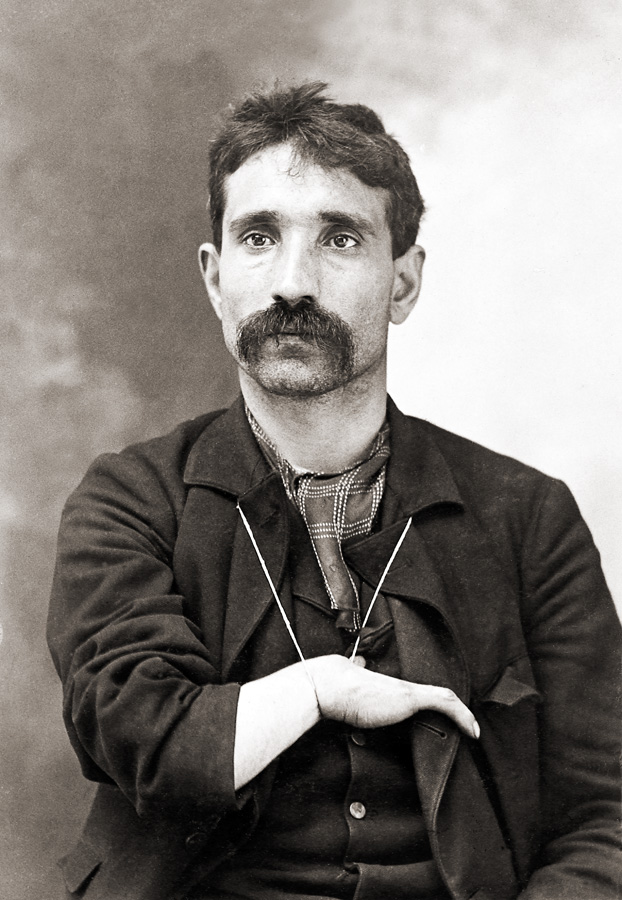
- Founding Boss Giuseppe Morello
- Founded by: Giuseppe Morello
- Founding location: Italian Harlem, New York City
- Years active: 1890s–1931
- Territory: Italian Harlem, Little Italy and The Bronx
- Ethnicity: Sicilian
- Criminal activities: Racketeering, counterfeiting, extortion, conspiracy and murder
- Rivals: Brooklyn Camorra, D'Aquila crime family, Schiro crime family

The Morello crime family (Italian: [moˈrɛllo]) was one of the earliest crime families to be established in the United States and New York City. The Morellos were based in Manhattan's Italian Harlem and eventually gained dominance in the Italian underworld by defeating the rival Neapolitan Camorra of Brooklyn. They were the predecessors of what eventually became known as the Genovese crime family.

== History ==
=== From Corleone to America ===
The Morello family traces its roots back to Corleone, Sicily. In 1865, Calogero Morello married Angelina Piazza who gave birth to two children: Giuseppe Morello (born May 2, 1867) and Maria Morello-Lima (née Morello, born c. 1869). Calogero Morello died in 1872, and one year later Piazza remarried to Bernardo Terranova. The new marriage produced five children: three sons, Vincenzo (born 1886), Ciro (born 1888) and Nicolo (born 1890), and two daughters, Lucia (born 1877) and Salvatrice (born 1880). Critchley mentions a possible third sister of the Terranovas, Rosalia Lomonte (1892 – October 14, 1915).

In 1892, Giuseppe Morello emigrated to the United States. On March 8, 1893, Giuseppe's family arrived in New York: his wife Maria Rosa Marvalisi, his mother Angelina Piazza, his stepfather Bernardo Terranova, his half-brothers Ciro, Nicolo, and Vincenzo, and his half-sister Rosalia. The Morello-Terranova family lived in New York for a while before moving to Louisiana, then Texas, and by 1896 the family was back in New York City.

=== 107th Street Mob ===
The brothers returned to New York and became known as the 107th Street Mob (sometimes called the Morello Gang) dominating East Harlem, Manhattan, and parts of The Bronx. Giuseppe Morello's strongest ally was Ignazio Lupo, a mobster who controlled Little Italy, Manhattan. On December 23, 1903, Lupo married Morello's half sister, Salvatrice Terranova.

The Morello-Lupo alliance continued to prosper in 1903, when the group began a major counterfeiting ring with powerful Sicilian mafioso Don Vito Cascio Ferro, printing $5 bills in Sicily and smuggling them into the United States. Many of the later "barrel murders", particularly that of Giuseppe "Joe" Catania, Sr. (whose body was found in July 1902), were thought to have been committed by the Morellos, who employed numerous members of the counterfeiting operation.

On April 13, 1903, the body of Benedetto Madonia, brother-in-law to police informant Giuseppe DiPrimo (de Priemo), was found in a barrel after being brutally tortured. A United States Secret Service detective, who had been investigating the counterfeiting ring, traced the man to a restaurant where he was seen with Morello crime family boss, Ignazio Lupo, along with associate and hitman, Tommaso "The Ox" Petto. New York detective Joseph Petrosino later confirmed Madonia's identity after visiting DiPrimo at Sing Sing Prison. A letter by Madonia seeking to leave the organization was found in a search of Madonia's house. With this evidence, several mafiosi were arrested including Morello, Lupo, Petto, and restaurant owner Pietro Inzarillo, as well as several other members. However, the charges were later dropped after witnesses changed their statements.

The Morello family had consolidated their hold on Upper Manhattan. Additionally, on November 15, 1909, New York police raided a building the Morellos were using in Highland, New York, as a front for their counterfeiting operation and recovered a large amount of American and Canadian counterfeit bills. After letters were found by Black Hand victims from New Orleans, fifteen members of the Morellos were arrested, including bosses Giuseppe Morello and Ignazio Lupo and member Pasquale Vassi, who possessed $1,200 worth of counterfeit money.

The trials began on January 26, 1910, and ended on February 19 with all members involved convicted, including Morello and Lupo, who were sentenced to 30 and 25 years, respectively, at Atlanta Federal Prison.

=== Mafia–Camorra War ===
With Giuseppe Morello's and Lupo's convictions, Nicholas "Nick" Terranova, the youngest of the three Terranova brothers, took over the family with the aid of his older brothers, Vincenzo and Ciro. The family was involved in many criminal activities from East Harlem to Greenwich Village. Soon after opening the Venezia Restaurant, the club became a popular hangout for the city's underworld.

Without Joseph Morello and Lupo the Wolf at the helm, the Morellos' power was waning. During this time, Gaetano Reina, a captain within the family, took advantage of its weakened status and broke off, forming his own separate mafia famiglia based mostly in the Bronx. Nick Terranova made an effort to unify much of the Italian underworld in the face of these problems. He attempted to unify the Sicilian mafiosi and the Neapolitan camorristi during the early 1910s but was unsuccessful despite his best efforts.

During this time, the Morellos had allied with powerful and prominent East Harlem businessmen and camorristi, including Giosue Gallucci, who possessed local political connections, and the Lamonti brothers. Gaetano "Thomas" Lamonti and brother Fortunato "Charles" Lamonti were known as cousins of the Morellos and owned a feed store down the street from the famous Murder Stable owned by Ignazio Lupo. After the 1914 murder of Charles Lamonti and the 1915 murder of Gallucci, the alliance between the Morellos and the East Harlem camorristi ended. The Brooklyn camorristi made plans to eliminate the mafiosi from Manhattan.

In early 1916, Camorra boss Pellegrino Morano and lieutenant Vincenzo Paragallo began moving into Morello territory. After six months of fighting, Morano offered a truce to end the stalemate. Mafia boss Nick Morello agreed to a meeting arranged at a Navy Street café owned by camorrista Alessandro Vollero. However, upon arriving on September 7, 1916, Morello was ambushed by five members of the Brooklyn Camorra group and killed along with bodyguard Charles Ubriaco. While the loss of the Morello family's senior leader was a blow to the Mafia, Morano was quickly charged with Nick Morello's murder after two members of the Camorra group, Tony Notoro and Ralph Daniello, contacted New York police and implicated Morano and Alessandro Vollero, revealing the war between the Sicilian and Neapolitan gangs. Both Morano and Vollero, after being denied help from New York detective Michael Mealli, along with the remaining leaders of the camorristi were convicted of murder and imprisoned, effectively ending the Mafia-Camorra War.

=== Morello family war ===
The Mafia–Camorra war ended in 1917, and Terranova brothers Vincenzo and Ciro kept control of the family. Many former Brooklyn Camorra members joined the Morello family; Umberto Valenti was one of new members. One year earlier in 1916, Giuseppe Masseria was released from prison after serving three years for burglary of a Bowery pawnshop and became a top member in the family. In 1918, Ciro Terranova was tried for the murders of gambling bosses Charles Lombardi and Joe DiMarco; the case was later dismissed. In 1920, both Giuseppe Morello and Ignazio Lupo were released from prison so their former captain, now Manhattan Mafia boss, Salvatore D'Aquila, sensing his power to be threatened by their return, ordered their murders.

One of D'Aquila's men, Umberto Valenti, had also run afoul of his boss and was under threat of death. To re-ingratiate himself with D'Aquila, Valenti would take out the rising power, the former captain and current ally of the Morellos, Giuseppe Masseria. First attempts failed and a war was on. On December 29, 1921, Masseria's men murdered Valenti's ally Salvatore Muaro on Chrystie Street. Then Valenti had Vincent Terranova murdered, effectively taking out the head of the Morello family. On May 8, 1922, while Terranova was in front of his home at 116th Street and 2nd Avenue, he was shot by a gunman from a moving car. Masseria ordered his men to murder Valenti and his bodyguard Silva Tagliagamba; they ambushed Valenti and Tagliabamba at Grande and Mulberry Streets in Manhattan shooting Tagliabamba but Valenti escaped. On August 11, 1922, Masseria's men (supposedly including a young Charlie Luciano) murdered Valenti, ending the conflict. Masseria became the boss of the Morello family, and Giuseppe Morello became his underboss.

== Historical leadership ==
=== Boss ===
- 1890s–1909 — Giuseppe "the Clutch Hand" Morello — founded the 107th Street Mob; imprisoned 1909
- 1909–1916 — Nicholas "Nick Morello" Terranova — killed during Mafia–Camorra war on September 7, 1916
- 1916–1920 — Vincenzo "Vincent" Terranova — stepped down becoming underboss
- 1920–1922 — Giuseppe "the Clutch Hand" Morello — stepped down becoming underboss
- 1922–1931 — Giuseppe "Joe the Boss" Masseria — paroled in 1920, became boss in 1922

=== Underboss ===
- 1903–1909 — Ignazio "Lupo the Wolf" Lupo — imprisoned 1910
- 1909–1916 — Vincenzo "Vincent" Terranova — became boss
- 1916–1920 — Ciro "The Artichoke King" Terranova — stepped down
- 1920–1922 — Vincenzo "Vincent" Terranova — murdered on May 8, 1922
- 1922–1930 — Giuseppe "the Clutch Hand" Morello — murdered on August 15, 1930

== Former members ==
- Giuseppe Fanaro – a member of the Morello family who was involved in the Barrel murder of 1903. In November 1913, Fanaro was murdered by members of the Lomonte and Alfred Mineo's gangs.
- Eugene "Charles" Ubriaco – a member of the Morello family, he lived on East 114th Street. Ubriaco was arrested in June 1915 for carrying a revolver and was released on bail. On September 7, 1916, Ubriaco along with Nicholas Morello meet with the Navy Street gang in Brooklyn and they both were shot to death on Johnson Street in Brooklyn.
- Tomasso "The Ox" Petto
