= Tony Paretti =

Antonio Paretti (1892 - February 17, 1927), also known as Tony Paretti or Tony the Shoemaker, was a Camorra gangster. He was a member of the Brooklyn-based Coney Island gang in New York City, serving as the right-hand man of Pellegrino Morano.

Paretti received a death sentence for his part in the killing of Nicholas Morello and Charles Ubriaco on September 7, 1916, during the Mafia–Camorra War. Paretti originally fled to Italy to escape capture, while his brother Aniello Paretti was imprisoned and charged with another unrelated murder. Both were also involved in the murder of Joe Nazzaro, the alleged killer of Giosue Gallucci, on March 16, 1917.

Paretti returned to New York in March 1926, confident that most of the witnesses against him would no longer be there. Nevertheless, Paretti was convicted for first degree murder. Notably, several of the witnesses who were called to testify against him "suddenly developed a surprising lack of memory," replying, "I cannot remember" to all questions asked of them. However, the prosecution was able to convince a fellow gangster, Alphonso Sgroia, to return to New York from Italy and testify against Paretti.

In the months leading up to his execution, security in Sing Sing prison was enhanced from 16 hours a day to 24 hours a day. Paretti attempted to pressure authorities to commute his death sentence to no avail. He was electrocuted on February 17, 1927, at the age of 35. One of his last visitors was future Mafia boss, Vito Genovese, and his brother Aniello who had spent 8 months on death row himself before being released.
