= Giuseppe Morello =

Italian-American crime boss

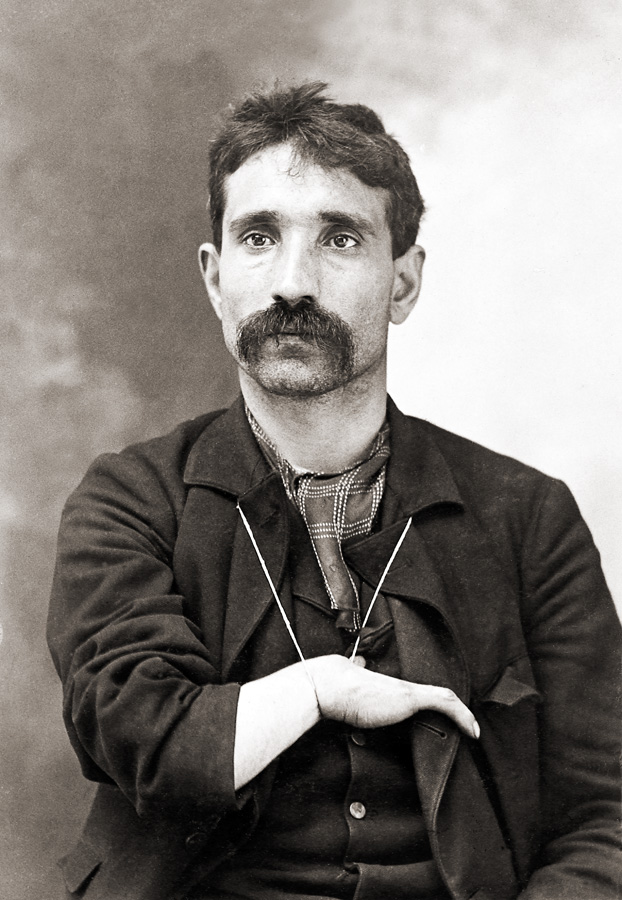
- Morello in 1902
- Born: May 2, 1867; Corleone, Sicily, Kingdom of Italy
- Died: August 15, 1930 (aged 63); New York City, U.S.
- Cause of death: Gunshot wounds
- Other names: Joseph Morello, Peter Morello, The Clutch Hand, The Old Fox
- Occupation: Crime boss
- Successor: Nicholas Terranova
- Relatives: Vincenzo Terranova (half brother), Ciro Terranova (half brother), Nicholas Morello (half-brother)
- Allegiance: Morello crime family
- Conviction: Counterfeiting (1910)
- Penalty: 25 years' imprisonment

Giuseppe "the Clutch Hand" Morello (Italian: [dʒuˈzɛppe moˈrɛllo]; May 2, 1867 – August 15, 1930), also known as "the Old Fox", was the first boss of the Morello crime family and later top adviser to Giuseppe "Joe the Boss" Masseria. He was known as Piddu (Sicilian diminutive form of Giuseppe) and his rivals the Castellammarese knew him as Peter Morello. He had a deformed right hand with only one finger, resembling a claw.

In the 1890s, Giuseppe founded a gang known as the 107th Street Mob, which later evolved into the Morello crime family. Today the Morello crime family is known as the Genovese crime family and is the oldest of the Five Families in New York City.

== Early life ==
Giuseppe Morello was born in Corleone, Sicily on May 2, 1867. His father Calogero Morello died in 1872 and his mother Angelina Piazza remarried one year later to Bernardo Terranova, who was a member of the Terranova Mafia clan of Corleone. Bernardo and Angelina had seven known children: two sons named Vincenzo (the first, born in 1874, died at age two; the second was born in 1886), Ciro (born 1888), Nicolò (born 1890), Lucia (born 1877), Salvatrice (born 1880), and Rosalia (born 1892, died October 14, 1915).

The Morello and Terranova children grew up together and Bernardo may have facilitated Giuseppe's early induction into the local cosca, or Mafia clan. Author David Crichley notes that Morello also had an uncle, Giuseppe Battaglia, who was a leader in the Corleonesi Mafia and who may have assisted in his nephew's passage. Giuseppe Morello married Maria Rosa Marsalisi (1867–1898) in 1889. The couple had two children: a daughter, Angela (born 1891 and died 1892), and a son, Calogero "Charles" Morello (born November 1892 in Corleone, died 1912).

The year of Morello's emigration to the United States is not certain. Author Mike Dash writes that Morello emigrated in 1892 after becoming a suspect in a murder in Corleone and after his counterfeiting ring had been compromised. Despite his departure, the Italian government brought a case to court and found him guilty of money counterfeiting. On September 14, 1894, he was sentenced to 6 years and 45 days imprisonment plus a fine and deprived of the right to hold public office. It is possible that the sentence was handed down in absentia; according to Critchley, it appears that Morello left Sicily for New York around this time.

Morello's three half-brothers Nicolò, Vincenzo and Ciro, his stepfather Bernardo, his mother Angelina, his sister Maria, his half sister Rosalia, his wife Maria Rosa Marsalisi and son Calogero would arrive in New York City on March 8, 1893. In the mid-1890s, Giuseppe Morello moved to Louisiana in search of employment and was joined by the other members of the Morello-Terranova family. The following year they moved to Texas and farmed cotton. After contracting malaria they returned to New York around 1897.

Morello tried his hand in different business ventures, including failed investments in a saloon and a date packaging business. Morello's first wife, Maria Rosa Marsalisi, died in 1898 in Corleone. In 1902, he acquired a saloon at 8 Prince Street in Manhattan which became a meeting place for members of his gang. In December 1903, Morello married Nicolina "Lena" Salemi (1884–1967), who stayed with him for the rest of his life.

== Morello crime family ==
An NYPD mugshot of Giuseppe Morello

In the 1890s, Giuseppe founded the 107th Street Mob which would later evolve into the Morello crime family. In 1903, Ignazio "the Wolf" Lupo, the Sicilian Mafia boss in Little Italy, Manhattan, married Morello's half sister Salvatrice.

Morello built his empire based on his merciless ordering of death sentences against anyone who dared to face him. Lupo, his main enforcer, was responsible for more than sixty murders in a 10-year period. The Morello family would frequently employ the notorious barrel murder system, dumping dismembered corpses into large wooden barrels. The barrels would then be thrown into the sea, left on a random street corner, abandoned in a back alley or shipped to nonexistent addresses in another city.

Family businesses included extortion, loan sharking, Italian lottery, robbery and counterfeiting. Illegally earned money was then legitimized by legal businesses such as stores or restaurants owned by the family, making them the first crime family in town to organize this kind of money laundering. They also introduced revolutionary ways of extorting small amounts of money every week from business owners in exchange for "protection", as opposed to the theft of large amounts which might bankrupt them. This technique was adopted from Black Hand gangsters and it led to increased profits for the gang.

Two members of Morello's famiglia who became Captains under Morello and who later gained much prominence in the New York underworld were Giuseppe Masseria and Salvatore D'Aquila.

By 1905, Morello had created the largest, most influential Sicilian crime family in New York City and was recognized as capo di tutti capi (boss of bosses) by Mafia leaders in other U.S. cities, according to Nicola Gentile.

== Fall and return ==
Morello was found guilty of counterfeiting again in 1910 and was sentenced to 25 years in prison. He was later paroled. In 1922, President Warren Harding freed Morello from the constraints of his parole by granting a conditional commutation of sentence.

The youngest of his three half brothers, Nicolo Terranova, took over control until 1916, when he was killed by the Neapolitan boss in Brooklyn, Pellegrino Morano, as well as Tony Parretti as part of the Mafia–Camorra War. Morello's remaining two half brothers Vincenzo Terranova and Ciro Terranova, took over as boss and underboss and ran the family until Morello's release from prison.

Newly released from Atlanta Federal Penitentiary in 1920 and trying to retake control of his empire, Morello found himself considered a threat to his former captain, now turned Mafia boss, Salvatore D'Aquila, who, within a year of Morello's release, ordered Morello killed.

Morello, along with a number of others now under orders of death by D'Aquila, fled to Sicily for a spell. One of these men, a former D'Aquila gunman, Umberto Valenti, went after Morello and his chief protector and ally, Giuseppe Masseria, in order to regain the favor of D'Aquila. A war ensued and, after much violence and some prominent deaths among the mafiosi involved, Valenti was killed by Masseria gunmen (some say including or solely Charles Luciano) in August 1922. With Valenti gone, D'Aquila's power began to lose its luster of invulnerability. Morello, sensing his time to rule had passed and the power of Masseria was on the rise, became consigliere to Masseria and prospered under him throughout the Prohibition years of the 1920s.

== Castellammarese War and death ==
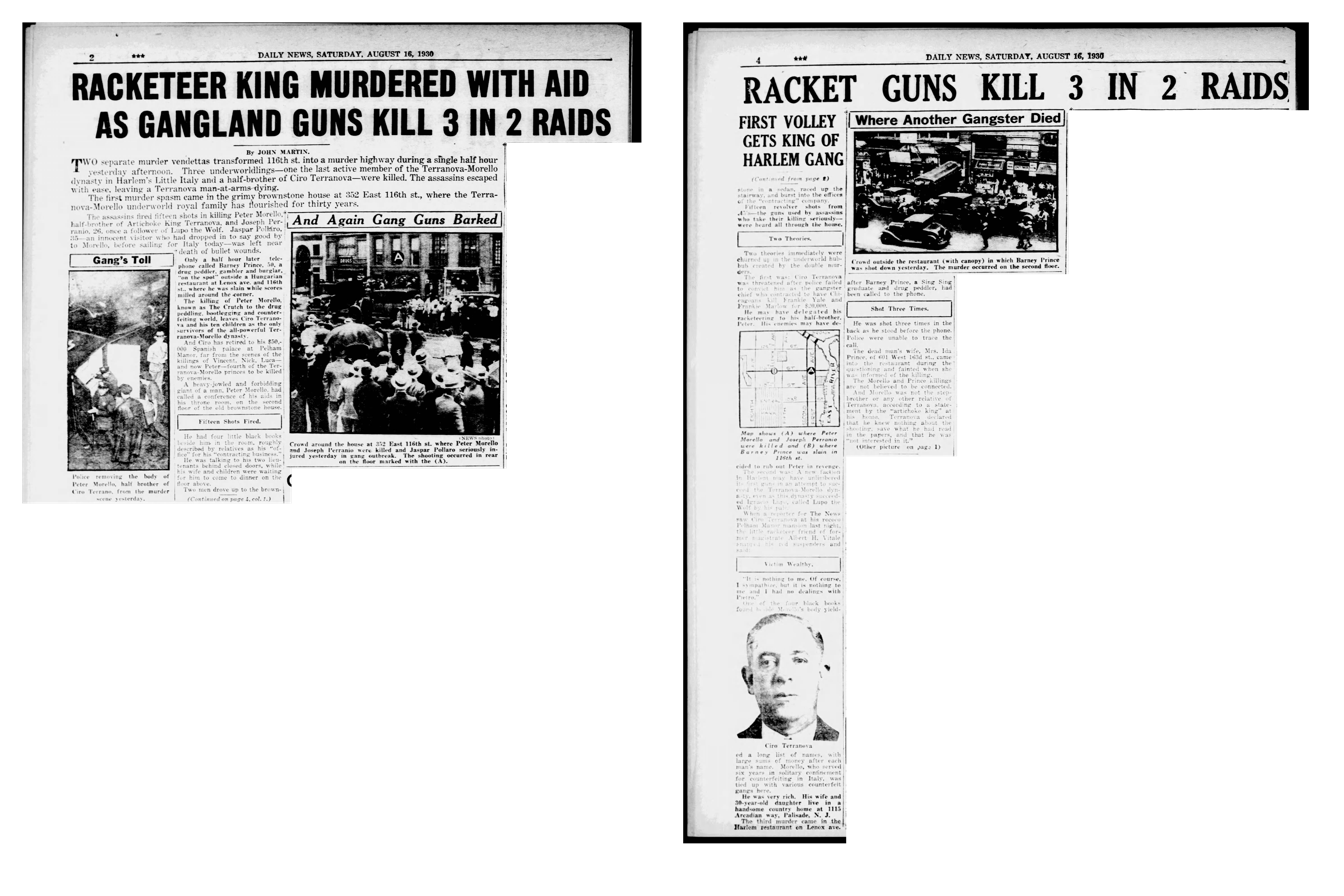
Multi-page story in the New York Daily News August 16, 1930, "Racketeer King Murdered with Aid As Gangland Guns Kill 3 in 2 Raids"

During the Castellammarese War, between 1930 and 1931, Masseria and Morello fought against a rival group based in Brooklyn, led by Salvatore Maranzano and Joseph Bonanno. Morello, an old hand at killing, became Masseria's "war chief" and strategic adviser.

One of the first victims of the war, Giuseppe Morello was killed along with associate Joseph Perriano on August 15, 1930, while collecting cash receipts in his East Harlem office. Joseph Valachi, the first made man in the American Mafia to turn state's evidence, identified Morello's killer as a Castellammarese gunman he knew as "Buster from Chicago".

Filmmaker Martin A. Gosch's The Last Testament of Lucky Luciano, a purported autobiographical account of Charles Luciano of disputed authenticity, claims that Luciano orchestrated Morello's murder.

American Mafia
New title Crime family established by Morello	Morello crime family Boss; 1890s–1909	Succeeded by Nicholas Morello
Preceded by Vincenzo Terranova	Morello crime family Boss; 1920–1922	Succeeded by Joe Masseria
Preceded by Vincenzo Terranova	Genovese crime family Underboss; 1922–1930	Succeeded by Joseph Catania
Preceded by New title	Capo dei capi Boss of bosses 1898–1909	Succeeded by Sebastiano DiGaetano
