= Silva Tagliagamba =

American mobster

Silvio Tagliagamba (died June 1922) was an early New York mobster and a member of the Morello crime family.

Tagliagamba served as a bodyguard for mob boss Umberto Valenti during the early 1920s. On May 8, 1922, Valenti allegedly murdered mobster Vincent Morello in Manhattan. When Morello's ally, Giuseppe "Joe the Boss" Masseria, heard about the shooting, he supposedly set an ambush for Valenti later that day outside the Liquor Exchange, an open-air market for bootleggers, in downtown Manhattan. Other accounts suggest that it was Valenti, not Masseria, who set up the ambush. In any event, during the ambush, Masseria shot and fatally wounded Tagliagamba. Both Valenti and Tagliagamba escaped the scene while Masseria was arrested.

In June 1922, Tagliagamba died from his wounds. Masseria was indicted on the Tagliagamba shooting, but the case never came to trial.
