= Umberto Valenti =

American mobster

- Born: August 14, 1891; Barcellona Pozzo di Gotto, Sicily, Kingdom of Italy
- Died: August 11, 1922 (aged 30); New York City, U.S.
- Cause of death: Gunshot
- Other name: "The Ghost"
- Occupation: mobster
- Allegiance: D'Aquila crime family

Umberto "The Ghost" Valenti (August 14, 1891 – August 11, 1922) was a Sicilian-born New York City gangster and prominent member of the D'Aquila crime family during the 1910s. He is frequently confused with Rocco Valenti, a Camorra gunman of the same era.

== Career ==
Valenti was born in Barcellona Pozzo di Gotto, Sicily and immigrated to America in 1910. After settling on the Lower East Side of Manhattan, he joined the Mafia family led by capo di tutti capi Salvatore D'Aquila. He was said to be so skillful at silently approaching and dispatching his victims, then departing before anyone could see him, that he, early on, earned the nickname of 'Lo Spirito' a.k.a. 'The Ghost.'

He was said to have been the shooter in the May 1914 murder of D'Aquila's chief rival, Italian Harlem mobster Fortunato Lomonte. After this successful hit, Valenti became known as D'Aquila's chief assassin.

By the beginning of Prohibition, Valenti was considered one of the best gunmen in New York; he was suspected in at least twenty murders. During this period, Umberto Valenti had run afoul of his boss, Salvatore D'Aquila, and was one of twelve men (including Giuseppe Morello, Ignazio Lupo, Ciro Terranova and others) marked for death. Valenti fled to Sicily for a time. Upon his return to America in January 1922, Valenti attempted to make amends with D'Aquila by eliminating the Boss's chief rival, Vincenzo Terranova.

== Valenti vs. Masseria ==
On May 7, 1922, the boss of the Morello/Terranova crime family, Vincenzo Terranova, was killed in a drive-by shooting near his E. 116th Street home. Valenti was believed to have been personally responsible. Mere hours later, Terranova's underboss Silva Tagliagamba was fatally wounded in Lower Manhattan by Valenti and gunmen working for him. The next day, Valenti and some of his men attacked the new boss of the rival Terranova family, Joe Masseria. Valenti found Masseria and his bodyguards on Grand Street "within a block of Police Headquarters". A deadly gunfight ensued. The New York Herald reported that "When the fight was ended, the gunmen had shot four men and two women, but had not harmed each other." Masseria tossed his pistol away and was arrested while fleeing the scene.

On August 9, 1922, Masseria walked out of his apartment at 80 2nd Avenue, and was rushed by two armed men who opened fire on him. Masseria ducked into a store at 82 2nd Avenue with the gunmen in pursuit. They shot out the front window and shot up the inside of the store. The gunmen fled across 2nd Avenue to a getaway car idling just around the corner on E. 5th Street. The car was a Hudson Cruiser. The gunmen jumped on the running boards as the car sped west on E. 5th Street towards the Bowery, guns blazing. The gunmen then plowed through a crowd and shot randomly at the blockade, wounding six men. Masseria survived the incident and was found by police in his upstairs bedroom shell-shocked. He was sitting on his bed dazed, with two bullet holes through his straw hat, which he was still wearing on his head. The incident gained Masseria new respect among gangsters as "the man who can dodge bullets" and his reputation began to rise as D'Aquila's began to wane.

== Death ==
Forty-eight hours later, on August 11, Umberto Valenti attended a sit-down meeting with Masseria and others in a cafe at the corner of Second Avenue and E. 12th Street. Accounts differ as to who was there. Masseria's key ally Giuseppe Morello is often said to have been present. The meeting was ultimately an ambush. Apparently, realizing his life was in danger, Valenti burst from the table and ran outside as the bullets began flying. An eight-year-old girl standing nearby was wounded. Valenti, gravely injured by gunfire, managed to make it on the running board of a passing taxi before collapsing onto the pavement where he died. The Herald stated, "Valenti, said to be strong in his hatred of Masseria, was killed coldly and with as little compunction as one would swat a fly." Gangland lore had long held that his killer was none other than Charles "Lucky" Luciano. Just after this incident, Giuseppe Masseria began being referred to as "Joe the Boss".
