= Ralph Daniello =

American mobster

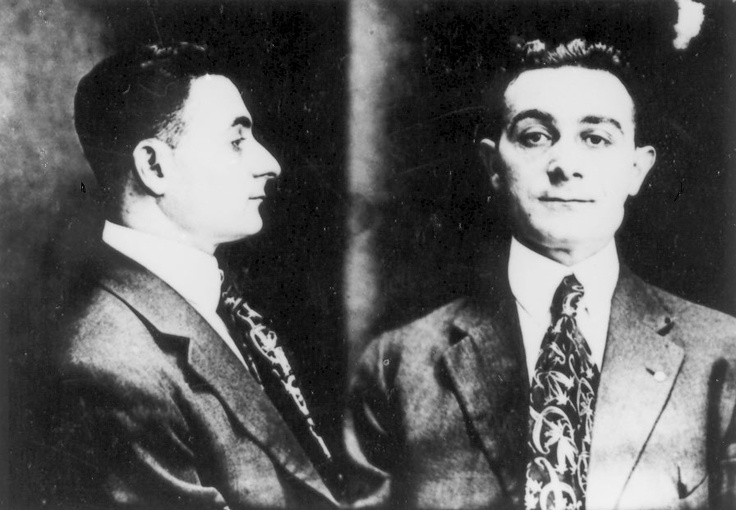
- Ralph "The Barber" Daniello
- Born: Alfonso Pepe; 1886; Pagani, Campania, Italy
- Died: August 15, 1925 (aged 39); Newark, New Jersey, U.S.
- Cause of death: Gunshot wounds
- Other name: The Barber
- Known for: Organized crime; informant
- Allegiance: Camorra in New York

Ralph Daniello (born Alfonso Pepe; 1886 – August 15, 1925), also known as "The Barber", was an Italian-born New York criminal who belonged to the Brooklyn Navy Street Gang and participated in a major gang slaying in the Mafia-Camorra War. In 1917, Daniello eventually became an informant for the New York police and helped destroy the Camorra crime gangs in Brooklyn. Daniello's testimony helped to clear up 23 homicide cases in New York.

== Early life ==
Daniello was born in Pagani, Campania in 1886 as Alfonso Pepe. In Italy he was arrested for attacking a woman and on suspicion of involvement in a murder. After his escape from prison in 1906 he made his way to the French port of Le Havre, from which he sailed to New York where he was smuggled in illegally.

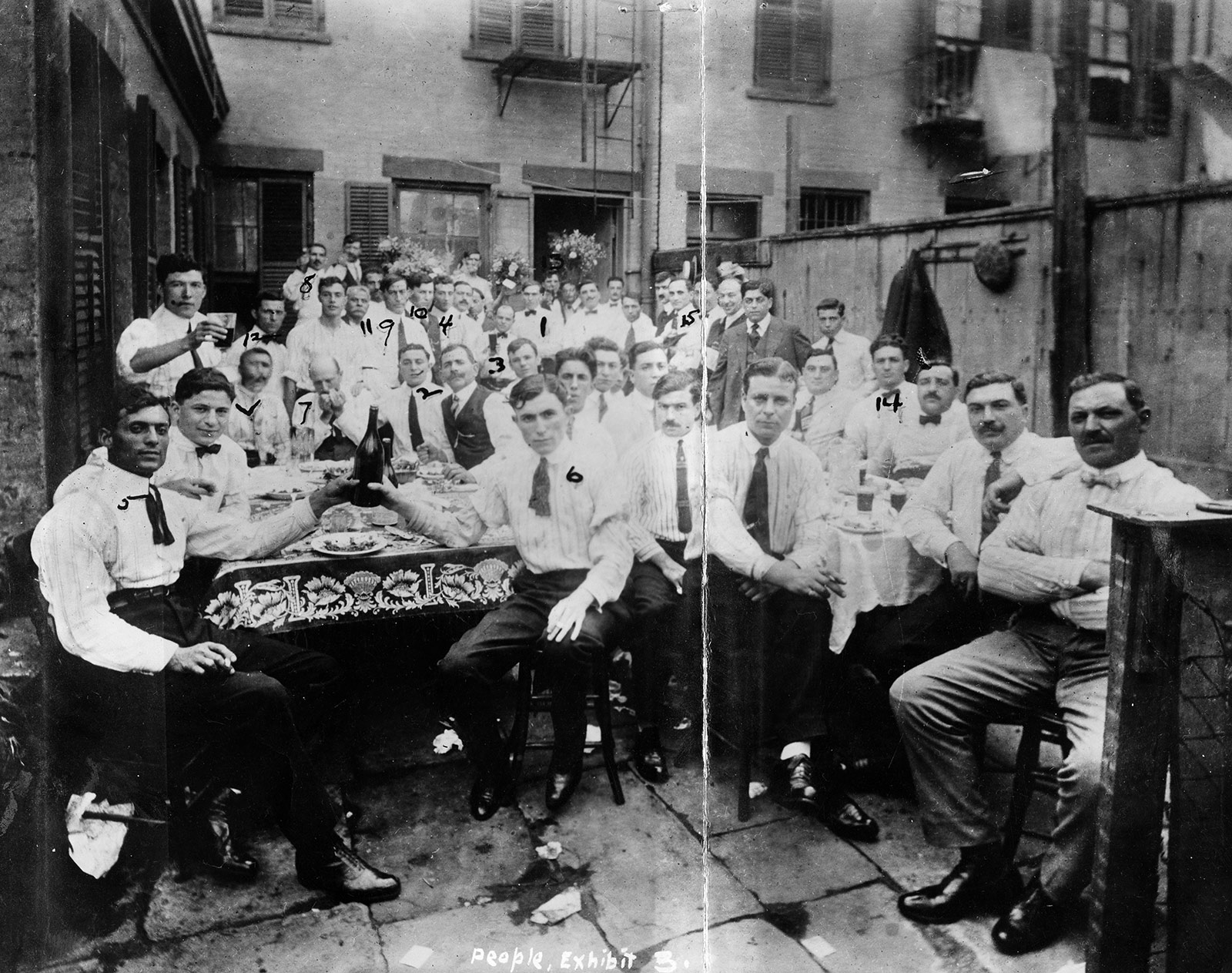
The Navy Street Gang, one of the Camorra groups in Brooklyn

In New York, Daniello became a low-level criminal with the Brooklyn-based Navy Street gang, made up primarily of Italians from Campania and Naples in Italy, where the Camorra hailed from, and headed by Alessandro Vollero and Leopoldo Lauritano based with its nerve centre in Vollero's coffee house at 113 Navy Street. Daniello participated in labor racketeering and extortion. He was involved in the 1913 Labor slugger war.

== Mafia-Camorra War ==
In 1916 he became involved in the Mafia-Camorra War. He was a member of the Navy Street Gang, made up primarily of Italians from Naples, Italy. In November 1916, Daniello participated in the ambush murders of Nicholas Morello and Charles Ubriaco on a New York Street. These killings were part of an ongoing gang war between the Morello crime family, part of the traditional Sicilian mafia, and the Brooklyn Camorra, a Neapolitan crime organization. During this era, a crime organization would usually consist of individuals from the same clan, village, or region in Italy. In later years, the gangs would be based more on individual families and would allow any Italian to become a full member.

== In hiding ==
After being acquitted on robbery and abduction charges, Daniello decided it wasn't safe to stay in New York. In May 1917, Daniello and his girlfriend fled to Reno, Nevada. In July 1917, the New York City Police Department (NYPD) police issued a warrant for Daniello's arrest for the May 7 murder of Louis DeMarro in Brooklyn. Meanwhile, Daniello and his girlfriend were running low on money in Reno. He wrote the Camorra Gang asking for help, but they ignored his requests. Daniello was eventually arrested in Nevada and extradited back to New York.

== Informant ==
Facing indictments on murder, grand larceny and perjury, Daniello began to tell the police about the Navy Street crew and its connection to the Morello and Ubriaco murders. He provided evidence about 23 murders. Several Grand Juries issued 21 indictments in November 1917.

New York prosecutors offered Daniello a deal if he would testify against Alessandro Vollero, the Camorra leader. Daniello, who had attended several high level meetings with Vollero, agreed to the deal. In 1917, Vollero was extradited to New York and indicted in the murders of Morello, Umbracio and Manhattan gambler George Verrizano (which Daniello later claimed he had participated in). Daniello's testimony, along with that of "Johnny the Left" Esposito, Tony Notaro, and other Navy Street and Coney Island gang members, led to Vollaro's conviction. The conviction of Vollero and his associates marked the end of both the Navy Street Gang and the Brooklyn Camorra organization.

== Death ==
Because of the abuse he received after testifying at the trial against Vollero, Daniello was moved to a different prison. He received a suspended sentence in consideration of his testimony. However, shortly after he was arrested for assaulting a man in Coney Island. Daniello claimed he shot the victim thinking that he had been sent on a vendetta from his former associates of the Navy Street gang. He was sentenced to five years in prison. Released in 1925, he was shot dead in front of his Newark, New Jersey, saloon on August 15, 1925.

== Sources ==
- Asbury, Herbert (1928). The Gangs of New York (2001 ed.). New York: Alfred A. Knopf. ISBN 1-56025-275-8.
- Critchley, David (2009). The Origin of Organized Crime in America: The New York City Mafia, 1891-1931. New York: Routledge. ISBN 978-0-415-99030-1.
- Dash, Mike (2009). The First Family: Terror, Extortion and the Birth of the American Mafia. London: Simon & Schuster. ISBN 978-1-58836-863-8.
- Nelli, Humbert (1981). The Business of Crime: Italians and Syndicate Crime in the United States. Chicago: University of Chicago Press. ISBN 0-226-57132-7.
