= Ignazio Lupo =

Italian crime boss

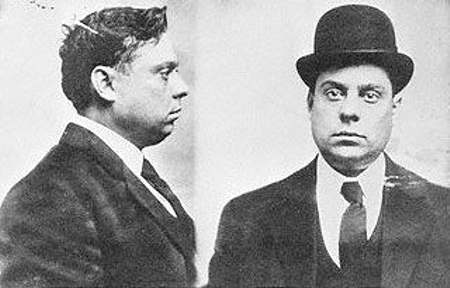
- 1909 mugshot of Lupo
- Born: March 21, 1877; Palermo, Sicily, Italy
- Died: January 13, 1947 (aged 69); New York City, U.S.
- Other names: Ignazio Saietta, The Wolf
- Occupation: Gangster
- Successor: Salvatore D'Aquila
- Conviction: Counterfeiting (1910)
- Penalty: 30 years' imprisonment

Ignazio Lupo (Italian: [iɲˈɲattsjo ˈluːpo]; March 21, 1877 – January 13, 1947), also known as Ignazio Saietta and Lupo the Wolf, was a Sicilian American Black Hand leader in New York City during the early 1900s. His business was centered in Little Italy, Manhattan, where he ran extensive extortion operations and committed other crimes, including robbery, loan-sharking, and murder. At the start of the 20th century, Lupo merged his crew with others in the South Bronx and East Harlem to form the Morello crime family, which became the leading Mafia family in New York City.

Suspected of at least 60 murders, he was caught by authorities in 1910, when the Secret Service arrested him for running a large scale counterfeiting ring in the Catskills. He was paroled after serving 10 years of a 30-year sentence. A few years later, he was forced into retirement by the emerging National Crime Syndicate led by Lucky Luciano.

== Early life ==
Ignazio Lupo was born in Palermo, Sicily, to parents Rocco Lupo and Onofria Saietta. He has sometimes been referred to as Ignazio Saietta, using his mother's maiden name, but his actual surname was Lupo.

From age 10, he worked in a dry goods store in Palermo. In October 1898, he shot and killed a business rival named Salvatore Morello, by Lupo's account in self-defense after Morello attacked him with a dagger during an argument in Lupo's store. Lupo went into hiding after the killing and, on the advice of his parents, eventually fled Sicily to escape prosecution.

After stops in Liverpool, Montreal, and Buffalo, he arrived in New York in 1898. On March 14, 1899, Lupo was convicted in an Italian court in absentia of 'willful and deliberate murder', reportedly due to the testimony of the clerks who worked in his store. Lupo never served the Sicilian sentence, though he would one day return to Sicily.

Upon settling in New York City, Lupo opened a store at East 72nd Street in Manhattan with his cousin Saitta, but moved his business to Brooklyn after a disagreement. In 1901, he moved his business back to Manhattan and opened a small import store at 9 Prince Street, while also running a saloon across the street at 8 Prince Street. Lupo's father, Rocco, joined him in New York City in 1902 and together they opened a retail grocery store on 39th Street between 9th and 10th avenues. Around this time, Lupo began preying on his fellow Italian immigrants, using the extortion tactics of the Black Hand.

== Morello crime family ==
In 1902, Giuseppe Morello acquired a saloon at 8 Prince Street, at the rear of the premises where Lupo was running his saloon. Morello had immigrated to the United States from Sicily in the 1890s and had been joined by his three half brothers Vincenzo Terranova, Ciro Terranova and Nicholas Morello. Lupo became closely associated with the Morello-Terranova faction and eventually married into their immediate family when he wed Salvatrice Terranova on December 23, 1903.

He maintained his leadership over his Little Italy-based interests, but in the early 1900s Lupo merged his Mafia faction with the Morello-Terranova faction, which basically formed what became known as the Morello crime family, then the leading Mafia family in New York City. Lupo kept his base of operations in Little Italy. He shared the overall leadership of the crime family with Giuseppe Morello, who operated from his base in East Harlem. Members of their group, including Morello's half brothers, led the affiliated groups and ran the rackets with soldiers such as Giuseppe Fanaro, Giuseppe "Joe" Catania Sr., Charles Ubriaco and Tommaso "The Ox" Petto, a top enforcer and killer within the crime family.

Lupo demanded absolute obedience from the members of his crew, killing one of his relatives because he suspected he might be a traitor. His reputation became so fearsome that it was common for Italian immigrants to cross themselves at the mention of his name.

== Crimes committed and jail time ==
Lupo was suspected of at least 60 murders, and may have committed many more. He was a suspect in the killing on July 22, 1902 of Giuseppe "Joe the Grocer" Catania. Catania was suspected of openly talking to his neighbors and friends about a counterfeit operation which he was involved in with Lupo. Catania also testified against several men in Palermo, which resulted in their 20-year prison terms. Catania was stabbed to death and left inside a potato sack on the shore of Bay Ridge, Brooklyn.

Lupo was also suspected of the April 14, 1903, barrel murder of Madonia Benedetto. He was not charged with any crimes until 1910, when the Secret Service arrested him for running a large scale counterfeiting ring in the Catskills. He was sentenced to 30 years and imprisoned in Atlanta Prison. He was paroled on June 30, 1920.

While serving out the conditions of parole, Lupo wanted to take a trip to Italy, but the Parole Act forbade him from leaving the country. In 1922, President Warren Harding freed Lupo from the constraints of his parole by granting a conditional commutation of sentence. The Annual Report of the Attorney General for 1922 mentioned Lupo's desire to return to Italy but also noted that his codefendant, Giuseppe Morello, had received a commutation after just eight years of imprisonment. The former Chief of the Selective Service considered the relative guilt of the two men to be roughly the same and thus recommended a commutation for Lupo.

Harding attached a condition to the commutation, requiring Lupo to remain "law-abiding" and "not connected with any unlawful undertaking during the period of the sentence". The President himself would be the sole judge of whether this condition was ever violated and, if it was, he could declare the commutation null and void. In such circumstance, the President would order Lupo arrested and returned to prison to serve out the remainder of the sentence.

Sometime in the early 1930s, the leaders of the emerging National Crime Syndicate called Lupo in for a meeting and forced him to give up nearly all of his rackets, except for a small Italian lottery in Brooklyn. Lupo relied almost entirely on violence and terror. The Syndicate preferred to use bribery first, and felt Lupo's tactics generated too much heat.

On his own, Lupo formed a protection racket involving bakers. In 1936, after New York Governor Herbert Lehman petitioned President Franklin D. Roosevelt to have Lupo returned to prison for massive racketeering, Lupo was returned to Atlanta Prison to serve a few years on his original counterfeiting sentence.

== Death ==
After his release, he returned to Brooklyn, where he died more or less unnoticed in 1947. Lupo and the four Morello-Terranova brothers are interred in Calvary Cemetery in Queens, New York, not far from Joe Petrosino, who investigated them, and other Morello crime family members.

== In popular culture ==
- There is a character called "Ignaz the Wolf" in author Damon Runyon's short story "Too Much Pep".
- The character of Don Fanucci in The Godfather Part II is based on Ignazio Lupo.

American Mafia
Preceded by New title	Morello crime family Underboss; 1903-1910	Succeeded by Vincenzo Terranova
