= Nicholas Morello =

Italian-American gangster

- Born: Nicolò Terranova; 1890; Corleone, Sicily, Kingdom of Italy
- Died: September 7, 1916 (aged 25–26); New York City, U.S.
- Cause of death: Murder by gunshot wounds
- Occupation: Crime boss
- Predecessor: Giuseppe Morello
- Successor: Vincenzo Terranova
- Parent(s): Bernardo Terranova(father); Angelina Piazza(mother)
- Relatives: Vincenzo Terranova (brother), Ciro Terranova (brother), Giuseppe Morello (half brother), Ignazio Lupo (brother in law) Salvatrice Terranova (sister)
- Allegiance: Morello crime family

Nicolò Terranova (1890 – September 7, 1916), also known as Nicholas "Nick" Morello, was one of the first Italian-American organized crime figures in New York City. He succeeded Giuseppe Morello as boss of the then Morello Gang in 1909 and was succeeded by Vincenzo Terranova in 1916. Along with his half-brother Giuseppe Morello and brothers Ciro and Vincenzo Terranova, he founded the Morello crime family, and was later one of the participants in the Mafia-Camorra War of 1915–17.

Terranova was born in Corleone, Sicily, in 1890 to parents Bernardo Terranova and Angelina Piazza. In 1893, Terranova emigrated from Sicily with his family, including his brothers Ciro and Vincenzo, arriving in New York on March 8, 1893. In 1903, Nicolo's sister Salvatrice Terranova married Ignazio "the Wolf" Lupo, who was running the Black Hand organization in Little Italy, Manhattan. Lupo went on to become underboss of the Morello crime family. In 1910, when Lupo and Giuseppe Morello were arrested for counterfeiting, Terranova, now known as Nicholas Morello, became the boss of the Morello crime family.

Nicholas Morello rose far above his relations to realize that the Americanization of the gangs would have to give birth to a great criminal network, each of its components at peace with the others and in concert controlling all the rackets in the country.

While Nicholas Morello Sicilian gangs controlled the rackets of East Harlem and Greenwich Village in Manhattan, the Brooklyn Camorristas, immigrant criminals from the Camorra gangs of Naples, extended their power in Brooklyn, collecting protection money from Italian storekeepers, coal and ice dealers and other businessmen, as well as operating rackets on the Brooklyn docks.

In 1915, Brooklyn Camorra leader Pellegrino Morano, a man who had his own dreams of expansion, began moving in on the Morello family's Manhattan territory of East Harlem and Greenwich Village. After a Neapolitan ally of the Morello family, Goisue Gallucci was killed in East Harlem. The more forward-looking Nicholas Morello thought it foolish to continue such old battles and offered to make a peaceful settlement. Pellegrino Morano took such a move as a sign of weakness and spurned the offer. By 1916 the warfare was so intense that only the most hardy mafiosi or Camorrista dared cross the East River into the other's domain. They usually returned home in a hearse.

Surprisingly, that same year Pellegrino Morano announced he was in favor of Nicholas Morello's call for an armistice. Morano invited Morello to come to Brooklyn to discuss terms, of course guaranteeing Morello safe conduct. Morello proved wisely cautious and for six months did no more than dicker about holding such a peace meeting, though he realized he would have to go if he hoped to advance his master plan. The war between New York's Sicilian Mafia and Neapolitan Camorra lasted for over two years.

== Assassination ==
On September 7, 1916, Morello and Charles Ubriaco were lured into a trap when they were invited to a chat with Morano and Navy Street gang boss Lauritano. Terranova (Nicholas Morello) and Ubriaco were shot and killed. Subsequently, they went after other East Harlem gang leaders, killing Giuseppe Verrazano, but were unable to reach the Morellos who stayed close to their house on East 116th Street.

The Neapolitans did not fear police investigations because they paid off police officers and omertà prevented witnesses from stepping forward. However, in May 1917, Ralph Daniello, aka 'The Barber', a member of the Navy Street gang who had been present at the meetings to decide on the murders, began to tell the police everything he knew about Morano, the Neapolitan gangs, and the recent murders.

On May 15, 1918, Morano was convicted of murder in the second degree in the case of Terranova and Ubriaco and sentenced to spend twenty years to life at Sing Sing prison. His associate Vollero received a death sentence, which was later reduced to a minimum of 20 years.

Tony Paretti received a death sentence for his part in the killing of Morello and Ubriaco. Paretti originally fled to Italy to escape capture, while his brother Aniello Paretti was imprisoned, charged with another murder. Both were also involved in the murder of Joe Nazzaro.

Nicolo and his three brothers lie in bare graves in Calvary Cemetery in Queens, New York, not far from Joe Petrosino, who investigated them, or other Morello crime family members, such as Ignazio "Lupo the Wolf" Lupo.

== Aftermath ==
After Nicholas Morello’s death, leadership of the Morello crime family passed to his brother Vincenzo Terranova, with another brother, Ciro, serving as underboss. The imprisonment of Morello and Morano brought what newspapers described as the first Mafia War to a close. Along with it faded Nicholas Morello’s ambition of forging a grand alliance of gangs.

American Mafia
Preceded by Giuseppe Morello	Morello crime family Boss; 1910–1916	Succeeded by Vincenzo Terranova
