= 1930s in organized crime =

This is a list of organized crime in the 1930s, arranged chronologically.

== 1930 ==
=== Events ===
- In a prelude to the Castellammarese War in New York City, New York mob boss Joe Masseria attempts to mediate a dispute between Chicago gangsters Al Capone and Joe Aiello. However, Aiello ignores Masseria's peacemaking and later threatens him for interfering. Masseria then goes to Aiello's main supporter, Detroit mobster Gaspar Milazzo, to get his support in ending the Chicago gang war. However, Milazzo refuses to help and is supported by a faction of the Brooklyn Castellamarese organization, led by Nicolo Schirò, and Buffalo mobster Stefano Magaddino's organization. Their actions precipitate a general split among American mafiosi and convince Masseria that these mobsters are plotting against him.
- New York gangster Charles Luciano, representing the "Young Turks" faction (which included mobsters such as Vito Genovese and Frank Costello), and Ciro Terranova begins secretly negotiating with Salvatore Maranzano to persuade him to declare independence from Joe Masseria.
- Brooklyn mobster Joe Parrino is killed by members of the Castellammarese organization. Following his death, control of the Brooklyn Castellammarese is turned over to Sicilian boss Salvatore Maranzano by Buffalo, New York mob boss Stefano Magaddino.
- Chicago and New York police detectives establish a connection between the weapons used in the St. Valentine's Day Massacre and the murder of New York mobster Frankie Yale, implicating Chicago boss Al Capone in Yale's death.
- The US Federal Bureau of Narcotics replaces the Narcotics Division of the Prohibition Unit.
- Murder, Inc. gunman George Defeo is killed in New York by the Shapiro Brothers.
- Benjamin Bennett, a New York mobster brought to Chicago by George "Bugs" Moran as muscle for the North Side Gang, disappears shortly after his arrival.

=== Timeline ===
- January – Brooklyn mobster Cola Schirò disappears after being forced to pay $10,000 to Joe Masseria. After Schiro's disappearance, Joe Parrino succeeds Schiro as leader of the Brooklyn Castellammarese faction.
- January 5 – Ciro Terranova issues a press statement regarding the dramatic robbery at the Judge Albert Vitale Fundraiser dinner in New York in December 1929. Terranova claims that he is being used as a scapegoat for the split in the New York Tammany Hall political organization. He also claims to be a "man of peace" and asks to be left alone.
- February 4 – Chicago gangster Julius Rosenheim is killed shortly after agreeing to become a police informant.
- February 20 – Carlo T. Piranio, founder of the Dallas crime family, dies of natural causes. His organization is taken over by his brother, Joseph T. Piranio.
- February 26 – Bronx mobster Tom Reina is killed by a shotgun blast by mobster Vito Genovese while leaving his aunt's home. Reina is later replaced by Joe Pinzolo. Reina, an ally of Masseria, had been suspected of secretly negotiating to defect to Maranzano's organization before his death.
- March 14 – The New York State Appellate Court orders the removal of Magistrate Albert Vitale due to his ties to organized crime figures such as Ciro Terranova and Arnold Rothstein and an unexplainable $10,000 deposit to his bank account.
- March 17 – Released from prison in Philadelphia, Al Capone returns to Chicago to resume his war against mobster Joe Aiello.
- April – Raymond "Craneneck" Nugent Bank robber and killer with the Egan's Rats gang of St Louis "Vanished" in Florida.
- April – Detroit bootlegger Joseph Galbo is convicted of bribery (April 8) and sentenced to 15 months in federal prison (April 14).
- April 13 – Clinton G. Price, district attorney of Juneau County, Wisconsin and political figure within Milwaukee, is severely wounded by a shotgun blast at his home. Price dies the following morning.
- May 6- Mob boss Tony Buccola "Disappears" after alleged confrontation with organized Crime Figures {Joseph Ardizzone}. The only trace of him is his car found in Venice California. Allegedly Buccola claimed to have information in the disappearance of Frank Baumgartker who vanished November 25, 1929.
- May 31 – Gaspar Milazzo of the Detroit crime family, is shot and killed while walking through a Detroit fish market.
- June 1 – Fox Lake Massacre, Fox Lake Illinois Verne Miller killed three and wounded two men in revenge for disappearance/death of his friend Eugene "Red" McLaughlin in May 1930 by Al Capone gang. {McLaughlin body found in Chicago canal}
- June 9 – Chicago Tribune journalist Alfred Lingle is shot and killed in a train station in Chicago, Illinois. The Chicago newspapers would promise a $55,000 reward for information on the murderer. It would be rumored that Lingle had extensive connections to organized crime.
- June 30 – Thomas Somneiro, a Chicago Outfit lieutenant, is found dead in Chicago's West Side. He was strangled to death.
- July 5 – Cleveland, Ohio mobster Joe Porrello is killed, along with his bodyguard Sam Tilocco, by an unidentified gunman while dining at a restaurant owned by mobster Frank Milano. Milano would succeed Porrello as leader of the Cleveland syndicate.
- July 15 – Vito Bonventre, Underboss to Nicolo Schiro, is gunned down outside his garage in Brooklyn.
- July 31 – Thomas McNichols and James "Bozo" Schupe, two smalltime bootleggers, shoot each other to death on Madison Street in Chicago.
- August 15 – Peter "The Clutching Hand" Morello, consiglierie to Joe Masseria, and his bodyguard Giuseppe Piranio are killed by gunmen employed by rival boss Salvatore Maranzano. The gunmen possibly include the mysterious mobster known only as Buster from Chicago.
- September – Forming a secret alliance with the remnants of deceased mobster Tom Reina's organization, Salvatore Maranzano arranges to have Joe Pinzolo, the new Reina family boss, killed in early September. Pinzolo would be killed by Bobby Doyle outside the offices of the Lucchese crime family. The hit is reportedly planned by Lucchese bosses Tommy Lucchese and Tommaso Gagliano.
- September 5 – Tommy Lucchese is arrested for the murder of Joe Pinzolo. However, charges are later dropped due to lack of evidence.
- September 23 – Al Capone rival and Unione Siciliane President Joe Aiello is killed in a drive-by shooting outside a friend's home. Aiello's death eliminates a major threat to the Chicago Outfit. Agostino Loverdo is placed by Capone as head of the Union Siciliane. However, the organization's value greatly declines over the decade, quietly dissolving by the late 1930s.
- November 5 – Mobsters Steve Ferrigno and Alfred Mineo, allies of Joe Masseria, are killed by Salvatore Maranzano's gunman outside Ferrigno's home in New York. Masseria narrowly avoids the ambush himself.

=== Arts and literature ===
- Doorway to Hell (film) starring Lew Ayres and James Cagney.

=== Births ===
- May 30 – Corrado Carnevale, Sicilian High Court judge and mafia associate
- November 16 – Salvatore Riina "Toto", Sicilian mafia boss
- December – James Torello "Turk", Chicago Outfit member and involved in loansharking

=== Deaths ===
- Ike Bloom [Isaac Gittelson], Jim Colosio lieutenant
- George Defeo, Murder, Inc. member
- George Maloney, Chicago gangster and co-leader of a bootlegging gang with Michael "Bubs" Quinlan
- Joe Parrino, New York mobster
- February 4 – Julius Rosenheim, Chicago gangster and police informant
- February 20 – Carlo T. Piranio, founder of the Dallas crime family
- February 26 – Tom Reina, New York mobster
- April – Raymond "Craneneck" Nugent Bank robber and killer "Vanished" in Florida.
- April 13 – Clinton G. Price, Wisconsin District Attorney and political figure
- May 6 – Crime boss Tony Buccola "vanishment"
- May 31 – Gaspar Milazzo, former New York mobster and now leader of the Detroit crime family
- June 9 – Alfred Lingle, journalist
- June 30 – Thomas Somneiro, Chicago Outfit lieutenant
- July 5 – Joseph Porrello, Cleveland mobster
- July 31 – Thomas McNichols, Chicago bootlegger
- July 31 – James Schupe "Bozo", Chicago bootlegger
- August 15 – Peter Morello, "The Clutching Hand", Masseria consigliere and former leader of the Morello crime family
- September 5 – Joe Pinzolo, New York mobster
- September 23 – Joe Aiello, Chicago mobster and president of the Unione Siciliane.
- November 5 – Steve Ferrigno, New York mobster
- November 5 – Alfred Mineo, New York mobster

== 1931 ==
=== Events ===
- The Commission is developed in The Atlantic City hotel by "Lucky" Luciano, Meyer Lansky, and The Five Families.
- The Castellammarese War continues as mob boss Joe Masseria offers to negotiate with his rival, Salvatore Maranzano. Maranzano and the Castellammarese faction refuse to end the war, demanding the death of Masseria ally Joe "The Baker" Catania. Although Catania would be murdered later in 1931, the war would continue.
- Mobster Salvatore Sabella is arrested for assault and battery using a motor vehicle; however, he receives a suspended sentence. During his indictment, New Jersey police discover that his address matches that of Stefano Magaddino, leader of the Buffalo crime family, following Magaddino's arrest in 1921. Shortly after his arrest, the 40-year-old Sabella retires as leader of the Philadelphia crime syndicate in favor of lieutenant John Avena.
- Charles Entratta, a partner of New York gangster Jack "Legs" Diamond is gunned down in a Brooklyn neighborhood.
- February 3 – Joe Catania is killed as he leaves his home in New York. It is thought that Masseria ordered Catena's murder out of suspicion that he was hijacking Masseria's liquor shipments.
- April 15 – Mob boss Joe Masseria is killed by Joe Adonis, Vito Genovese, Albert Anastasia, and Bugsy Siegel on the orders of Lucky Luciano. Ciro Terranova drives the getaway car. This effectively ends the long Castellammarese War in New York.
- May – Following Masseria's death, Salvatore Maranzano declares himself capo di tutti capi (boss of bosses) during a mob conference in Chicago, Illinois. While the conference was to serve as a reconciliation with Al Capone's Chicago Outfit, ally Charles Luciano and others conspire to eliminate Maranzano.
- September 10 – On orders of Charles Luciano and Frank Costello, boss of all bosses Salvatore Maranzano is murdered in his headquarters on Park Avenue in Manhattan by gangsters disguised as police officers. That same day, several of Maranzano's lieutenants, including James Marino, are killed by unknown gunmen including outside a Bronx neighborhood barbershop. The bodies of Maranzano allies Samuel Monaco and Louis Russo would later be recovered from Newark Bay; both corpses would show signs of torture. These events may or may not have been the basis for the beginning of the alleged "Night of the Sicilian Vespers" in which many old world Sicilian-born mafiosi are killed throughout the country by the Luciano-Lansky faction in the aftermath of the Castellammarese War.
- September 13 – Joseph Siragusa, leader of the Pittsburgh crime family, is shot to death in his home. He is succeeded by John Bazzano.
- September 17 – Meyer Shapiro, who controls bootlegging, illegal gambling and prostitution in New York's East Side, is murdered by former associates Abe "Kid Twist" Reles and Martin "Bugsy" Goldstein, who quickly take control of his criminal operations. His younger brother Irving was previously killed outside his Bronx apartment on July 11. One year later, Willie Shapiro would also be killed, buried alive by Reles and his associates.
- October 15 – Joe Ardizonne, head of the Los Angeles crime family, disappears and is presumed murdered (possibly a victim of the "Night of the Sicilian Vespers"). Mobster Jack Dragna {died 1956} would go on to succeed Ardizzone as leader of the Los Angeles family.
- October 17 – Al Capone is sentenced to 11 years in prison for tax evasion and fined $80,000
- December 18 – New York Prohibition gangster Jack "Legs" Diamond is shot to death while staying at a safe house in Albany, New York by a number of unidentified gunman.
- December 22 – Irish-American mob boss Frankie Wallace, on the pretense of a sit-down with Italian-American mobsters, is ambushed and murdered in Boston's North End. The Gustin Gang would be the first victims in a three-year systematic elimination of Irish-American gangsters in the United States.

=== Arts and literature ===
- Little Caesar (film) starring Edward G. Robinson
- The Public Enemy (film) starring James Cagney
- Smart Money (film) starring Edward G. Robinson and James Cagney
- Road to Perdition starring Tom Hanks, Paul Newman, Jude Law, and Daniel Craig
- Season 5 of HBO's Boardwalk Empire

=== Births ===
- Vincent Napoli, Gambino crime family member and Brooklyn drug smuggler
- Leonard Teperow, West Roxbury bookmaker and Mafia associate
- Al Tornabene "Pizza Al", Chicago Outfit boss
- March 19 – Robert Trimbole, Australian drug baron and organized crime leader.
- September 30 – Giuseppe Calò "The Banker", Sicilian mafioso

=== Deaths ===
- Charles Entratta "Charlie Green", New York mobster and associate of Jack Diamond
- February 3 – Joe Catania, New York mobster and a lieutenant to Joe Masseria
- April 15 – Giuseppe Masseria "Joe the Boss", New York mobster, boss of bosses
- May 8 – Sam Carlino Underboss to brother Pete Carlino of Colorado's Bootleg gang.
- July 11 – Irving Shapiro, New York (East Side) mobster
- September 10 – Salvatore Maranzano, New York mobster, boss of bosses
- September 10 – Pete Carlino, Head of Colorado bootleggers.
- September 10 – James Marino (James LaPore), Salvatore Marranzano lieutenant
- September 10 – Samuel Monaco, Salvatore Maranzano ally and New Jersey underboss
- September 10 – Louis Russo, Salvatore Maranzano ally and New Jersey consigliere
- September 13 – Joseph Siragusa, leader of the Pittsburgh crime family
- September 17 – Meyer Shapiro, New York (East Side) mobster
- October 15 – Joseph Ardizzone, Los Angeles crime family boss
- December 22 – Frankie Wallace, Boston mobster and leader of the Gustin Gang
- December 22 – Barney (Dodo) Walsh, Boston mobster and member of the Gustin Gang

== 1932 ==
=== Events ===
- Chicago Outfit mob boss Alphonse "Al," "Scarface" Capone is sent to the Atlanta Federal Penitentiary after his 1931 conviction for tax evasion. Francesco "Frank 'The Enforcer' Nitti" Nitto succeeds Capone as leader of the Outfit. But, since Capone is in prison, Felice "Paul 'The Waiter" Ricca" DeLucia becomes the real, new Outfit boss. With all of Chicago's organized crime activity consolidated into the Outfit, that organization begins to resemble the modern day National Crime Syndicate.
- Charles "Lucky" Luciano begins employing Louis "Lepke" Buchalter's "The Combination (called Murder, Inc. by the press) for National Crime Syndicate murder contracts.
- Future Gambino crime family leader, Paul Castellano, is brought into the family] by boss Carlo Gambino.
- Sicilian mafiosi Vito Cascio Ferro dies in Rome, Italy while in prison.
- February 9 – Renegade hitman Vincent "Mad Dog" Coll is killed in a drive-by shooting at a public telephone booth while attempting to extort money from mob boss Owney "Killer" Madden.
- July 29 – Pittsburgh bootleggers John, Arthur, and James Volpe are shot to death in a Pittsburgh coffee shop. The hits were reportedly ordered by Pittsburgh crime family leader John Bazzano.
- August 8 – John Bazzano is found stuffed in a burlap sack on a Brooklyn street He had been strangled, then stabbed to death. Bazzano's murder may have been connected to the gangland slaying of the Volpe brothers weeks earlier. Vincenzo Capizzi would later succeed Bazzano as head of the Pittsburgh crime family.
- September 1 – New York Mayor James J. Walker resigns from office, following his testimony before the Seabury Commission.

=== Arts and literature ===
- Scarface (film) starring Paul Muni.

=== Births ===
- Salvatore Bonanno "Bill", Bonanno crime family member and son of crime family boss Joseph Bonanno.
- Frank Imbruglia, East Boston gunman
- Ralph Scopo, Colombo crime family member and Brooklyn labor union racketeer.
- Giuseppe Lambeti "Joe", drug trafficker involved in the Pizza Connection and cousin of Salvatore Lamberti
- Salvatore Lamberti, Sicilian mafiosi convicted in the Pizza Connection
- July 28 – Alphonse D'Arco "Little Al", Lucchese crime family acting boss turned government witness.

=== Deaths ===
- Vito Cascio Ferro, Sicilian mafiosi
- February 9 – Vincent Coll "Mad Dog", New York Prohibition, Irish-American mobster
- March 16 – Antonio Lonzo, New York mobster
- March 16 – Gerard Vernotico, New York mobster
- July 29 – John Volpe, Pittsburgh bootlegger
- July 29 – Arthur Volpe, Pittsburgh bootlegger
- July 29 – James Volpe, Pittsburgh bootlegger
- August 8 – John Bazzano, Pittsburgh crime family leader

== 1933 ==
=== Events ===
- Reform Mayor Fiorello La Guardia is elected mayor of New York City.
- Recently released from prison, Salvatore "Sam" "Mooney" Giancana becomes a bodyguard and chauffeur to Antonino "Tony," "Joe Batters" Accardo.
- Walter Sage, a member of Brooklyn's Abe Reles-Harry Maione gang, is stabbed to death by Murder, Inc. assassin "Pittsburg Phil" Harry Strauss.
- January 24 – Charles "King" Solomon, the leading Prohibition bootlegger in Boston's underworld, is killed at the Cotton Club in South Boston.
- March 7 – Salvatore Sabella, along with John Avena and Domenico Pollina, are acquitted for a 1927 gangland slaying.
- May 30 – Sebastiano Domingo aka Buster from Chicago killed in New York City; five others wounded-of whom one died.
- June 17 – In an attempt to free bank robber Frank "Jelly" Nash from federal custody, Verne Miller, Charles "Pretty Boy" Floyd, and Adam Richetti, ambush federal agents and local police at the Kansas City Union Station parking lot resulting in the deaths of FBI Agent Raymond J. Caffrey, Oklahoma, Police Chief Otto Reed, Kansas City Policemen W. J. Grooms and Frank Hermanson, as well as Frank Nash himself. The event would become known as the "Kansas City Massacre".
- August 12 – Gas Fascone, a gunman for Kansas City mobster John Lazia, is shot and killed by police after murdering Joe Lusco lieutenant Ferris Anthon.
- October 9 – Gus Winkler, a gambler and bootlegger on Chicago's West Side (or North Side), is machine gunned to death. Winkler was suspected to have been involved in planning the St. Valentine's Day Massacre.
- November 29 – Vernon C. Miller, an associate of New York mobster Louis "Lepke" Buchalter and one of the surviving gunmen of the Kansas City Massacre, is found murdered in Detroit (possibly members of New Jersey mobster Abner Zwillman's organization).
- December 5 – Prohibition ends following the ratification of the 21st Amendment.

=== Arts and literature ===
- Lady Killer (film) starring James Cagney.

=== Births ===
- Khun Sa "Opium King", Burmese warlord and opium dealer.
- Stephen Maltese, Genovese crime family associate
- August 8 – Carmine Persico "The Snake", Colombo crime family, boss
- October 2 – Aniello Migliore, Lucchese crime family underboss
- November 14 – Danny Greene "The Irishman", Cleveland gangster

=== Deaths ===
- Walter Sage, Brooklyn mobster and associate of Abe Reles-Harry Maione gang
- January 24 – Charles Solomon, Boston Prohibition gangster
- May 30 – Sebastiano Domingo aka Buster from Chicago killed in New York City
- June 17 – Frank Nash "Jelly", St. Louis gangster and victim of the Kansas City Massacre
- June 17 – Raymond J. Caffrey, FBI Agent and victim of the Kansas City Massacre
- August 12 – Ferris Anthon Joe Lusco lieutenant
- August 12 – Gas Fascone, Kansas City mobster
- October 9 – Gus Winkler, Chicago (West Side) mobster involved in illegal gambling and bootlegging
- November 29 – Vernon C. Miller, associate of New York mobster Louis "Lepke" Buchalter and participant in the Kansas City Massacre

== 1934 ==
=== Events ===
- Phil D'Andrea is elected president of the Unione Siciliana, a Sicilian fraternal organization, in Chicago.
- April 22 – Baby Face Nelson, hiding out with John Dillinger, at the Little Bohemia Lodge just outside Manitowish Waters, Wisconsin kills FBI Special Agent W. Carter Baum in a shootout.
- Spring – Headed by Meyer Lansky and Johnny Torrio, organized crime leaders hold a conference at the Waldorf Astoria Hotel in New York to discuss the formation of a National Crime Syndicate.
- July 2 – Paul Castellano is arrested for the armed robbery of a Hartford, Connecticut store. Sentenced to one year imprisonment in the Hartford County Jail, Castellano serves three months before being released in December.
- July 22 – John Dillinger killed in Chicago by the FBI.
- October – New York Mayor Fiorello La Guardia orders a police raid on gambling parlors. This raid damages over 1,000 slot machines owned by mob boss Frank Costello.
- October 9 – Ferdinand "The Shadow" Boccia is abducted by Willie Gallo and Ernest "The Hawk" Rupolo after a dispute with Vito Genovese over a fixed card game. Boccia is later murdered.

=== Arts and literature ===
- When the Kellys Rode (film)
- Jimmy the Gent (film) starring James Cagney.

=== Births ===
- November 6 – Isoji Koga, the founder of the Dojin-kai
- Americo Petrillo "The Cigar", Patriarca crime family soldier and associate of William P. Grasso
- Frank Salemme "Cadillac Frank", Patriarca crime family leader and former member of the Winter Hill Gang

=== Deaths ===
- April 26 - John "Red" Hamilton, bank robber mortally wounded by police on April 23 in Minnesota and later died in Illinois
- May 23 – Clyde Barrow, outlaw shot dead by Federal marshals
- May 23 – Bonnie Parker, outlaw shot dead by Federal marshals
- July 22 – John Dillinger, Public enemy #1 shot dead by the FBI
- August 23 - Homer Van Meter, bank robber shot dead by police in St. Paul MN
- September 22 - Charles Makley, bank robber shot by prison guards during an attempted escape from Ohio State Prison
- October 9 – Ferdinand Boccia, New York mobster
- October 17 - Harry Pierpont, bank robber executed by electric chair
- October 22 -Charles Arthur Floyd, Public enemy #1 shot dead by the FBI
- November 27 – Babyface Nelson, Public enemy #1 died from wounds suffered in a shootout with 2 FBI agents

== 1935 ==
=== Events ===
- Owney Madden, a mob leader and speakeasy owner, leaves New York City. Madden's departure follows several years of police surveillance after the shooting death of renegade mobster Vincent "Mad Dog" Coll. Madden later settles in Hot Springs, Arkansas, establishing gambling operations there and forming political attachments through his hotel operation.
- Gunman Joseph "Joey Doves" Aiuppa joins the Chicago Outfit to help protect their criminal operations in Cicero, Illinois.
- January 30 – Frank Milano, former boss of the Cleveland crime syndicate, flees the United States for Mexico. Milano is succeeded by Alfred "Big Al" Polizzi.
- March – Salvatore Sabella is arrested, convicted, and imprisoned for three months for illegally distilling alcohol in Montgomery County, Pennsylvania.
- April – Tri-State Gang member Francis Wiley is convicted of the 1934 kidnap-murder of Philadelphia racketeer William Weiss. Tri-State Gang leaders Walter Legenza and Robert Mais had previously been convicted of murder and executed in Richmond, Virginia in February.
- July 16 – "Lupo the Wolf" Ignazio Saietta is charged with extortion. Saietta had been intimidating Italian bakers into joining a local New York labor union he controlled.
- July 25 – George Musey, associate boss of the Downtown Gang, is assassinated by the Maceo Crime Syndicate.
- August 22 – Vincenzo Troia, Sicilian mafiosi and associate of former "boss of all bosses" Salvatore Maranzano, is gunned down. Troia was reportedly conspiring to assume control of the Newark-based New Jersey crime syndicate.
- September 9 – Abraham Weinberg, a lieutenant of Dutch Schultz, disappears and is presumed murdered. Weinberg had been running Shultz's organization since Shultz went into hiding in 1933. Reportedly, Weinberg had been secretly negotiating with syndicate leaders Charles Luciano and Louis Buchalter. Schultz may have murdered Weinberg after returning to power.
- October 23 – After threatening the life of New York State prosecutor Thomas Dewey, Dutch Schultz is murdered along with Otto Berman, Lulu Rosencrantz and Abraham Landau at the Palace Chophouse in Newark, New Jersey. The hit is reportedly conducted by Albert Anastasia's crew on orders from Lucky Luciano's National Crime Syndicate. Shultz's criminal operations are subsequently taken over by Vito Genovese with the help of lieutenant Michael "Trigger Mike" Coppola.
- October 23 – Martin "Little Marty" Krompier, premier enforcer and lieutenant of Dutch Schultz's policy operations in Harlem, is severely wounded by rival gunmen. This attack comes just hours after Schultz and his other associates are gunned down in Newark. Krompier ultimately survives the attack.

=== Arts and literature ===
- 'G' Men (film) starring James Cagney.
- The Petrified Forest (broadway play written by Robert E. Sherwood) starring Humphrey Bogart.

=== Deaths ===
- Walter Legenza, co-leader of the Tri-State Gang
- Robert Mais, co-leader of the Tri-State Gang
- August 22 – Vincenzo Troia, Sicilian mafiosi and associate of Salvatore Maranzano
- September 9 – Abraham 'Bo' Weinberg, Dutch Schultz lieutenant
- October 23 – Dutch Schultz (Arthur Flegenheimer), New York Prohibition mobster and member of the National Crime Syndicate
- October 23 – Otto Berman, financial consultant of Dutch Schultz
- October 23 – Abraham Landau, Dutch Schultz gunman
- October 23 – Lulu Rosencrantz, Dutch Schultz gunman

== 1936 ==
=== Events ===
- U.S. Attorney Thomas Dewey successfully prosecutes mobster Jacob "Gurrah" Shapiro for violating the Sherman Anti-Trust Act. Shapiro receives a two-year sentence.
- Syndicate numbers runner and bookie Lester "Binny" Binion is forced to flee Dallas, Texas. Binion eventually opens Binion's Hotel and Casino in Las Vegas, Nevada.
- January 4 – Ciro Terranova, a former boss of the New York Morello crime family, is arrested by New York City police on vagrancy charges as he was entering Manhattan.
- February 14 – "Machine Gun" Jack McGurn, a high-ranking member of the Chicago Outfit and the reported organizer of Chicago's St. Valentine's Day Massacre, is murdered in a Milwaukee Avenue bowling alley, in Chicago.
- May 1 – Alvin "Creepy Karpis" Karpowicz is arrested in New Orleans, he is the last of the public enemies to be captured and is the only public enemy to be captured alive.
- May 19 – Nicholas Longo, the sister of Buffalo, New York mobster Steve Magaddino, is killed by a bomb explosion in an attempt on Maggadino's life.
- June 6 – As part of his crusade against organized crime, U.S. Attorney Thomas Dewey prosecutes New York mob leader Charles "Lucky" Luciano for pandering. On this day, Luciano is convicted. He would later be sent to the Clinton Correctional Facility in Dannemora, New York.
- July 15 – President Franklin Roosevelt orders the arrest of Ignazio "the Wolf" Lupo for violating the terms of his parole to serve the remaining sentence stemming from a counterfeiting charge in 1918.
- August – While again attempting to return to Manhattan, Ciro Terranova is arrested on a second vagrancy charge and is held in custody.
- August 17 – "Big Nose" John Avena, leader of the Philadelphia crime family, is gunned down by the rival Lanzetti Brothers. This would begin a five-year gang war lasting until the death of William Lanzetti in 1939. After Avena's death, underboss Joe Bruno assumes control of the Philadelphia organization from his headquarters in New Jersey.
- September 12–13 – Joseph Rosen, a Brownsville, Brooklyn candy store owner and government witness against Louis "Lepke" Buchalter, is murdered by Emmanuel Weiss, James Ferraco and Harry Strauss. The crime would remain unsolved until 1940, when mobster Abe Reles became a government informant and implicated Buchalter.

=== Arts and literature ===
- Bullets or Ballots (film) starring Edward G. Robinson and Humphrey Bogart.
- Dead End (broadway play written by Sidney Kingsley)
- Fury (film) starring Sylvia Sidney and Spencer Tracy.
- The Petrified Forest (film) starring Humphrey Bogart.

=== Births ===
- James Basile "Duke", Chicago Outfit bookmaker and later government informant
- John DiGilio "Johnny Dee", Genovese crime family member involved in New Jersey waterfront labor racketeering and loansharking
- Gaetano Mazzara "Tommy", business partner and cousin of Frank Castronovo involved in the Pizza Connection
- Arnold Squitieri, underboss and acting boss of the Gambino Crime Family
- Salvatore Mazzurco, brother-in-law of Giuseppe Lamberti and drug trafficker involved in the Pizza Connection
- February 9 – Anthony DiLapi, Lucchese crime family soldier
- June 22 – Masaru Takumi, the founding head of the Takumi-gumi

=== Deaths ===
- Paul Kelly (Paolo Antonini Vaccarelli), Five Points Gang leader
- February 14 – Jack McGurn (Vincenzo Gibaldi) "Machine Gun", Chicago Outfit member
- August 17 – John Avena "Big Nose", Philadelphia crime syndicate leader
- September 12–13 – Joseph Rosen, Brownsville candy store owner and government witness

== 1937 ==
=== Events ===
- Ciro Terranova, former leader of the Morello crime family, is arrested for vagrancy in New York.
- January 8 – The Cuban government places certain gambling operations under the control of future Cuban President Col. Fulgencio Batista. Batista then allows New York mobster Meyer Lansky and his associates to open the first syndicate casinos in Havana.
- February 22 – Newark, New Jersey mobster Gaspare D'Amico is severely wounded in a failed murder attempt (reportedly ordered by Profaci crime family boss Joseph Profaci). D'Amico eventually flees the country and his organization is taken over by Stefano Bedami (DeCavalcante), now answering to the Five Families of New York.
- May 11 – Gambler Ferdinand "The Shadow" Boccia is murdered by Willie Gallo and Ernest "The Hawk" Rupolo on the orders of mob boss Vito Genovese.
- June 14 – Francesco Lanza, leader of the San Francisco crime syndicate and father of the future leader John Lanza, dies of natural causes and is succeeded by Anthony Lima.
- October 5 – Nicola Gentile, a high-ranking member of crime families in Kansas City, Missouri, Pittsburgh, Pennsylvania, and New York, is arrested in New Orleans for drug trafficking. Following his release on bail, Gentile flees to Sicily in 1939.

=== Arts and literature ===
- Dead End (film) starring Humphrey Bogart.
- Kid Galahad (film) starring Edward G. Robinson and Humphrey Bogart.
- The Last Gangster (film) starring Edward G. Robinson.

=== Births ===
- Vincent DiNapoli "Vinnie", Genovese crime family lieutenant involved in construction and labor union racketeering
- John Matarazzo, Genovese crime family member
- John Paul Spica, associate of Anthony Giodano
- March 17 – Frank Calabrese, Sr., hitman of the Chicago Outfit

=== Deaths ===
- May 11 – Ferdinand Boccia "The Shadow", New York mobster and gambler
- June 14 – Francesco Lanza, leader of the San Francisco crime syndicate and father of the future leader John Lanza

== 1938 ==
=== Events ===
- John Giannola of "Green Ones gang" of East St Louis-died age 40 of natural Causes.
- After losing his estate in Pelham Manor, New York, former mob leader Ciro Terranova returns to New York City. On February 19, Terranova suffers a stroke and dies the following day.
- Julius Richard "Dixie" Davis, longtime defense lawyer for Dutch Schultz, is imprisoned.
- May 2 – Detroit mobster Joe Tocco is shot in the back and dies the following day. His death was possibly connected to mobster Joseph Zerilli, who had been consolidating his power in Detroit since the end of Prohibition.
- August 21 – Hyman Yuran, a former associate of Louis "Lepke" Buchalter is killed by Murder, Inc. His body is later found in a lime pit near the small town of Loch Sheldrake, New York.

=== Arts and literature ===
- The Amazing Dr. Clitterhouse (film) starring Edward G. Robinson and Humphrey Bogart.
- Angels with Dirty Faces (film) starring James Cagney, Pat O'Brien and Humphrey Bogart.
- Racket Busters (film) starring Humphrey Bogart.

=== Births ===
- John E. Farrell "Fast Jack", Patriarca crime family associate
- February 11 – Manuel Noriega, Panamanian military leader and drug trafficker
- December 14 – Frank Cullotta, Chicago Outfit associate and Soldier in Las Vegas

=== Deaths ===
- January 5- John Ginnola of "Green Ones gang" of East St Louis
- February 20 – Ciro Terranova "The Artichoke King", Morello crime family leader
- May 2 – Joe Tocco, Detroit mobster
- August 21 – Hyman Yuran, a former associate of Louis Buchalter

== 1939 ==
=== Events ===
- Cleveland, Ohio sportsman Arthur B. "Mickey" McBride, the one time leader of the Mayfield Road Mob in Cleveland, purchases the Continental Press racing wire service from Moses Annenberg.
- The three year gang war between the Philadelphia crime family and the rival Lanzetti Brothers ends after the death of leader William Lanzetti. The remaining Lanzetti gang members leave the city soon after.
- Chicago Outfit member Salvatore "Sam," "Mooney" Giancana is sentenced to three-years imprisonment.
- After his arrest in 1937 for drug trafficking in New Orleans, Nicola Gentile flees the United States while out on bail. He later returns to Sicily.
- Vito Genovese leaves the United States, after being charged for the murder of Ferdinand Boccia, later arriving in Sicily.
- January 28 – Louis Cohen and Isadore Friedman, witnesses scheduled to testify against Louis "Lepke" Buchalter, are murdered in New York City.
- January 29 – George Weinberg, a numbers runner for Dutch Schultz, commits suicide while under police protection shortly before his scheduled testimony against Schultz.
- April 28 – Abraham "Whitey" Friedman is murdered by Murder, Inc. gunmen, on orders of Louis Butchalter.
- May 10 – Tootsie Fienstein, a one time associate of Louis Buchalter, is murdered.
- May 25 – New York Teamsters Union President Morris Diamond, on orders of Albert Anastasia, is murdered by members of Murder, Inc.
- Summer – Jack Dragna's gambling ships, in operation since Prohibition, are closed by the federal authorities.
- August 24 – Louis Buchalter, leader of Murder, Inc., turns himself in to federal authorities, where he arranges a plea bargain with Walter Winchell. However, he is later indicted by New York District Attorney Thomas Dewey and extradited to New York where he is charged and later executed for murder.
- September 6 – New York racketeer Irving "Puggy" Feinstein is murdered by members of Murder, Inc., including Abe Reles and Harry Maione, after being tied to a chair and burned to death.
- October 20 – Charles Carrollo, head of the Kansas City crime syndicate, is convicted of violating federal tax laws and imprisoned in Leavenworth Federal Penitentiary in Leavenworth, Kansas. He is reportedly succeeded by Charles Binaggio.
- November 16 – Due to ill health, Al Capone is granted an early released from Alcatraz, and committed to a hospital for treatment of paresis.

=== Arts and literature ===
- Persons in Hiding, non-fiction book by J. Edgar Hoover.
- Each Dawn I Die, film starring James Cagney and George Raft.
- King of the Underworld, film starring Humphrey Bogart.
- The Roaring Twenties, film featuring James Cagney and Humphrey Bogart.
- You Can't Get Away with Murder, film starring Humphrey Bogart.

=== Births ===
- Pietro Alfano, drug trafficker and nephew-in-law to Gaetano Badalamenti
- Louis DeSorbo "Big Louie", associate of the Genovese crime family
- Peter Gotti "One Eyed Pete", member and one time acting boss of the Gambino crime family
- Gennaro Langella "Jerry Lang", Colombo crime family, acting boss
- Joseph Ligambi "Uncle Joe", Philadelphia crime family, boss
- Joseph D. Pistone "Donnie Brasco", undercover FBI infiltrator of the Bonanno crime family
- April 23 – Stefano Bontade "The Prince", Palermo mafia boss

=== Deaths ===
- Walter Stevens, Chicago gangster involved in labor slugging
- January 28 – Louis Cohen, government witness
- January 28 – Isadore Friedman, government witness
- January 29 – George Weinberg, government informant and former associate of Dutch Schultz
- April 28 – Abraham "Whitey" Friedman, Murder, Inc. victim
- May 10 – Tootsie Fienstein, associate of Louis Buchalter
- May 25 – Morris Diamond, New York Teamsters Union President
- September 6 – Irving Feinstein "Puggy", New York racketeer
