= Frank Scalice =

Italian-American mobster (1893-1957)

- Scalice in 1948
- Born: Francesco Scalisi; September 23, 1893; Palermo, Sicily, Kingdom of Italy
- Died: June 17, 1957 (aged 63); New York City, U.S.
- Cause of death: Gunshots
- Resting place: Woodlawn Cemetery, Bronx, New York, U.S.
- Other names: Don Ciccio; Wacky; Don Cheech
- Citizenship: American
- Occupations: Mobster, rum runner, racketeer
- Predecessor: Manfredi Mineo
- Successor: Vincent Mangano
- Children: 6
- Relatives: Anthony Gaggi (second cousin); Dominick Montiglio (third cousin)
- Allegiance: Anastasia crime family

Frank Scalice (Note: Also spelled Scalise.) (/skɑːˈliːsi/; born Francesco Scalisi, Italian: [franˈtʃesko skaˈliːzi]; September 23, 1893 – June 17, 1957), also known as "Don Ciccio" and "Wacky", was an Italian-American mobster active in New York City, who led the future Gambino crime family from 1930 to 1931. He was consigliere from 1931 until his murder on June 17, 1957.

== Early life ==
Scalice was born Francesco Scalisi in Palermo, Sicily, Italy on September 23, 1893, to Vincenzo Scalisi and Emanuela Privetera. He was a cousin of Anthony Gaggi's father, and third cousin of Dominick Montiglio, Gaggi's nephew. In 1910s, with his brothers Thomas, Philip, Jack, Joseph and Giovanni, Frank emigrated to the United States, settling in The Bronx. He was married to Joan, and he had five daughters and one stepson. He operated his business from the Little Italy area in the Bronx. He also lived and raised his family in the City Island section of the Bronx. He was involved in many crimes and became Capo in the Brooklyn-based gang of Salvatore D'Aquila. After the murder of D'Aquila on October 10, 1928, the power in New York shifted to Joe Masseria's Manhattan-based gang. The successor of D'Aquila, Manfredi Mineo, connected Masseria with the alliance and came into conflict with Scalice as a result.

== Career ==
On November 5, 1930, Mineo and his underboss, Stefano "Steve" Ferrigno, were murdered by Castellammarese Sicilians, led by Salvatore Maranzano. Scalice became the new boss of the family and a strong ally and supporter of Maranzano in the Castellammarese War.

The Castellammarese War ended on April 15, 1931, when Masseria was killed. Maranzano met with the New York bosses in May 1931 to work out a peace plan and organize the Five Families. Scalice was recognized as the Don of one of the families. However, after the murder of Maranzano on September 10, 1931, new boss Lucky Luciano forced Scalice to resign as family boss. He was replaced with Vincent Mangano.

On September 8, 1945, Scalice helped mobster Bugsy Siegel open the Flamingo Hotel & Casino in Las Vegas. Scalice later became involved in the casino business.

Vincent Mangano's brother Philip was found dead near Sheepshead Bay, Brooklyn on April 19, 1951. Vincent disappeared; he was never found and was declared dead ten years later. It was widely assumed that Albert Anastasia had both brothers killed. After the deaths of the Manganos, Anastasia became the boss of the family, promoting Scalice as underboss.

== Death ==
On June 17, 1957, Scalice was assassinated by two gunmen at a vegetable market in the Bronx for selling memberships in the family. Scalice's funeral was held at the Scocozza Funeral Home in the Bronx. Police and federal agents attended the funeral and the Bronx District Attorney subpoenaed all the visitor records. Scalice is buried in Woodlawn Cemetery in the Bronx.

After his death, Carlo Gambino became Anastasia's underboss.

On September 7 of that year, Scalice's brother Joseph was murdered and declared missing on September 10. According to Joseph Valachi, he was killed by James Squillante, after he threatened to avenge Frank's murder, and like that of his brother it was ordered by Anastasia.

On April 27, 1959, Scalice's brother Giovanni, who had been held as a witness in his brother's murder, was discharged, and took a plane to Paris.

== In popular culture ==
The murder of Scalice inspired the assassination attempt on Vito Corleone in The Godfather, who was shot and critically wounded while buying fruit at a fruit stand.

== Notes ==
American Mafia
| Preceded by Manfredi Mineo | Gambino crime family Boss; 1930–1931 | Succeeded by Vincent Mangano |
| Preceded by Albert Anastasia | Gambino crime family Underboss; 1951–1957 | Succeeded by Carlo Gambino |
