= Gaspare Messina =

American mobster

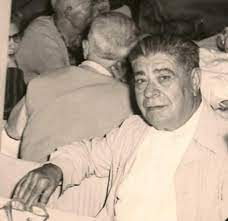
- Born: August 7, 1879; Salemi, Sicily, Italy
- Died: June 15, 1957 (aged 77); Somerville, Massachusetts, U.S.
- Occupations: Mobster, Mafia boss
- Allegiance: New England crime family

Gaspare Messina (Italian pronunciation: [ˈɡaspare mesˈsiːna]; August 7, 1879 – June 15, 1957) founded the New England Mafia that would later be known as the Patriarca crime family. He immigrated to Brooklyn from Sicily with his wife in 1905. Messina and his family arrived in Boston by 1915. He retired as head of the Boston Mafia in 1932, and was succeeded by Phil Buccola. Messina died on June 15, 1957, in Somerville, Massachusetts.

== Early life ==
Gaspare Messina was born on August 7, 1879, in Salemi, Sicily, to Luciano Messina and his wife, Gaspara Clementi. Gaspare married Francesca Riggio on November 4, 1905, in Salemi. Within the same month the couple emigrated to United States, arriving in New York Harbor on November 25, 1905, for an extended honeymoon. The couple settled in the Williamsburg section of Brooklyn and decided to stay in the United States permanently. While living in Brooklyn with a growing family, Messina opened a bakery and joined the local mafia that would later become known as the Bonanno crime family.

== Boston ==
By 1915, Messina and his family had moved to Boston. He opened a new bakery there and soon became recognized as the boss of the local Sicilian-based Mafia. The exact circumstances of his crime family's formation and his elevation to boss are unknown. All that is certain is that he arrived in Boston by 1915, and in Nicola Gentile recalled being invited to a banquet in his honor in 1921 by Messina, the local mafia boss in Boston.

In 1923, the U.S. Secret Service found evidence of Messina's involvement in a counterfeiting scheme when they arrested Salvatore Leonardi, finding a letter in his possession addressed to Messina and discovered that Messina had sent a $100 money order to the leaders of the scheme. Over fifty people were arrested for being involved in the scheme to distribute a half-million dollars' worth of counterfeit $10 Federal Reserve Bank of Boston notes. Messina was never charged in the scheme, but he took an extended trip to Sicily, returning in December 1924.

In 1925, Messina was the president of a wholesale grocery business called G. Messina & Company. One of his partners in the business, Frank Cucchiara, was arrested on March 26, 1925 for possession of guns, six sticks of dynamite and 96 ounces of morphine. Later that year, Cucchiara was fined $50 for running an illegal lottery.

Around 1927, Messina and his family moved to the nearby suburb of Somerville.

In a December 1930 meeting in Boston, Messina was selected to become a temporary capo di capi by fellow mafiosi after stripping the title from Joe Masseria during Masseria's struggle with rival gangster Salvatore Maranzano, often referred to as the Castellammarese War. Maranzano acquired the title after he proved victorious in the conflict.

== Death ==
According to an FBI listening device placed in Raymond Patriarca's office, Messina stepped down as boss in 1932 and was replaced by Phil Buccola. After his retirement he retained an "advisory" role to his successors. Messina died on June 15, 1957, in Somerville, Massachusetts.

== See also ==
- Black Hand (extortion)

American Mafia
Preceded by Title Established	Patriarca crime family Boss c.1915–1932	Succeeded by Phil Buccola
Preceded by Joe Masseria	Capo dei capi Boss of bosses 1930–1931	Succeeded by Salvatore Maranzano
