= Buster from Chicago =

American mobster

Buster from Chicago was a pseudonym used for a mobster and freelance hitman of the 1930s. He is alleged to have played a key role in the Castellammarese War (1929–1931) as the assassin of Giuseppe Morello and others. Some claim that Buster was gangster Sebastiano Domingo (1910–1933), notably Bill Bonanno, the son of Bonanno crime family leader Joseph Bonanno, who participated in the war. Others charge that Buster is a character created by Joe Valachi to evade his responsibility for various killings.

== Life as hitman ==
Buster's crime companions knew little of his background, other than that he was from Chicago. Joe Valachi, a mobster turned government informant, described Buster as a "college boy" in appearance and claimed he carried a Tommy gun inside a large violin case. While working with the unknown assassin, Valachi noted his exceptional skill with a wide range of weaponry including pistols, shotguns and machine guns. Contrary to Valachi's story that has him hiding a Tommy gun in a violin case, Buster did carry a sawed-off, 12 gauge pump shotgun in a guitar case.

Buster's first murder assignment for Salvatore Maranzano was to kill Giuseppe Morello. On August 15, 1930, Morello and Joseph Perrano were shot dead in the former's East Harlem office. Two gunmen were seen fleeing the scene. Some accounts claim that Albert Anastasia and Frank Scalise were the shooters that day, although Valachi wrote that Buster was responsible.

Buster was also responsible for the deaths of top Masseria lieutenants Alfred Mineo and Steve Ferrigno, gunning them down with his guitar-cased shotgun as they walked through the courtyard of a Bronx apartment complex on November 5, 1930. As his accomplices, Girolamo "Bobby Doyle" Santuccio and Nick Capuzzi, fled the scene, Buster allegedly ran into an investigating patrolman who had heard the gunfire. In the guise of a frightened bystander, Buster told the officer the direction of the shooting and calmly walked away as the officer rushed to the scene. Joe Valachi then picked up the three assassins and sped them to safety.

On February 3, 1931, Buster was stationed in a basement apartment on Belmont Avenue in the Bronx in order to watch for Giuseppe Catania aka Joe the Baker. As his quarry left a store across the street with his wife, Buster opened fire. Catania fell mortally wounded and Buster made a clean getaway in the commotion that followed. Buster was supposedly proud of the fact that, despite the wide blast pattern of his shotgun, Catania's wife was unharmed.

Although he survived the Castellammarese War, Buster was distrustful of the new mob regime. According to Valachi, Buster wanted to continue fighting against Lucky Luciano because "They'll take us away, one by one." After this, according to Valachi's McClellan Committee testimony, Buster "was killed during an argument at a crap game."

== Sebastiano Domingo ==
Sebastiano Domingo
- Born: 1910; Castellammare del Golfo, Sicily, Italy
- Died: May 30, 1933 (aged 23); burial June 3, 1933; Lower East Side, New York City, NY, U.S.
- Cause of death: Gunshot wounds
- Resting place: St. John Cemetery, Queens
- Other name: "Buster from Chicago"
- Citizenship: Italian
- Occupations: Mobster, freelance hitman
- Known for: Assassination of Giuseppe Morello
- Relatives: Tony Domingo (brother); Matilda (niece); Leo DiMaria (uncle); Mary Domingo (sister-in-law); Sam and Frank DiMaria (cousins)

Sebastiano Domingo was born in 1910 in Castellammare del Golfo, Sicily. Sebastiano's nickname was Bastiano (hence Buster), and he also used the alias of Charles Domingo. In Valachi's unpublished memoirs, he claimed that Buster from Chicago, "is Castellamarese (sic) and that's why the old man got him to join in with us." Domingo and his family immigrated to America in 1913 and settled in Chicago's Little Italy. The family lived on Oak Street, near the infamous Death Corner that was the scene of many Black Hand-related murders.

By 1920, the Domingo family was recorded as living on a farm near Benton Harbor, Michigan. Bastiano's older brother Tony was a member of a small fraternity of Castellammare families that sold illegal alcohol in the Benton Harbor area. Tragedy marked Domingo's stay in Michigan. On December 31, 1925, Bastiano's six-year-old niece Matilda was accidentally shot and killed by her ten-year-old uncle Leo DiMaria, who had been playing with a revolver he found in the cushions of a couch. Eight months later two of Domingo's cousins, Sam and Frank DiMaria, lost their lives in a distillery accident. On October 22, 1927, Bastiano's sister-in-law Mary Domingo was killed by a car bomb apparently meant for her estranged husband Tony. He and 17-year-old Bastiano shot up a local social club where the alleged bomber, Louis Vieglo, was hiding. Both were arrested before they could kill their target. Bastiano told the police that he was Tony Domingo's brother "Charles".

By late 1928, the Domingo family had returned to Chicago. On August 29, 1929, Tony Domingo was shot to death while eating in an Ogden Street restaurant operated by Pasquale Spilotro (the law-abiding father of infamous future Chicago Outfit made man Tony Spilotro). Bastiano had been seen hanging out in the neighborhood with his brother in the weeks before Tony's murder. The elder Domingo's killer was never positively identified. By the spring of 1930, Bastiano had moved in with relatives in Westchester County, New York. The youthful (and mostly unknown) Sebastiano Domingo was ready to join the Maranzano family.

On May 30, 1933, Sebastiano "Bastiano" Domingo was playing cards with a few others at the Castle Cafe in Manhattan's Lower East Side. As they were, four gunmen barged inside and opened fire on the card players. An eyewitness reported that one of the triggermen yelled, "You bunch of rats," just before the bullets began flying. Police found Domingo dead on the sidewalk outside the cafe and five other men wounded. One of the victims, Salvatore Ferrara, eventually died of his wounds. Over 200 friends and relatives attended the dual funeral at St. John's Cemetery on June 3, 1933.

== Joe Valachi ==
In A Man of Honor (1983), mob boss Joseph Bonanno identifies Buster as Sebastiano Domingo: According to Bonanno:

Bastiano, or Buster, was the quickest to set up and the best shot among us. He could shoot from any angle and from any direction. His specialty was the machine gun, with which he was a virtuoso.

Bonanno's description of Buster is different from Valachi's. Bonanno's Buster is recalled as short instead of tall like Valachi's. Crime author Allan May argues that Buster was a character invented by Valachi to avoid acknowledging his role in the killings of Mineo and Ferrigno. Valachi was inducted as a "made man" immediately after these killings. Furthermore, according to May, there was no obvious motive for the mob to induct him at this point. However, Bonanno was attempting to remember comparative height 30 years' after the event, and a photograph allegedly of "Buster" printed in Joseph Bonanno's book shows instead a man of medium height. May himself did not attempt to pursue the claim made by Bonanno that "Bastiano" Domingo was, indeed, the fabled Castellammare War gunman. Maranzano had a strong motive to induct Domingo into his crime family in late 1930 after observing his highly effective role in the murders of Manfredi Mineo and Steve Ferrigno, top men in the Masseria mob.
