= Steve Ferrigno =

Italian American mobster (1900-1930)

Stefano Ferrigno (May 12, 1900 – November 5, 1930) was an American mobster of Sicilian origin who led an important criminal gang in the 1920s. Ferrigno was murdered along with Alfred Mineo during the so-called Castellammarese War.

== Early years ==
Ferrigno was born in Sicily and emigrated to the United States. His parents were Gaetano Ferrigno and Santa Schiro. During the 1910s, Ferrigno joined New York's Italian-American underworld. Ferrigno worked his way up the ranks of the Coney Island, Brooklyn based Neapolitan Camorra crime family led by Pellegrino "Don Grino" Morano and his top Lieutenant, Alessandro Vollero, who led the Navy Street Gang. It is not known why Ferrigno, a Sicilian, was affiliated with a Neapolitan crime group, which in that era was highly unusual. A possible explanation is that Ferrigno grew up in the same Brooklyn neighborhood as the Neapolitans. Steve Ferrigno was the brother of Colombo crime family street soldier Bartolo (Barioco Bartulucia) Ferrigno, who was active in organized crime during the 1940s and 1950s. He served under the rule of Joseph Magliocco and was later implicated in drug trafficking and other crimes by government witness Joseph Valachi.

== Emergence as a crime boss ==
In the 1920s, Ferrigno was a mid-level leader in the Brooklyn crime family of Salvatore "Totò" D'Aquila, the self-proclaimed "Boss of Bosses" of the New York Mafia. Ferrigno was deeply involved in bootlegging, the most lucrative criminal activity during the Prohibition era, as well as illegal gambling, extortion, and prostitution. Labor racketeering became a profitable for all the Italian crime groups in New York. The D'Aquino family's access to the Brooklyn waterfront allowed Ferrigno and his associates to engage in cargo theft, extortion of the dockworkers, and exercise control over the longshoremen's unions.

== Rise to power ==
In 1928, D'Aquila was murdered on the orders of rival Manhattan Mafia Boss Giuseppe "Joe the Boss" Masseria. Ferrigno and Mineo had been business associates and allies of Masseria; it is possible they conspired with him to eliminate D'Aquila so they could become the new gang leaders.

Whatever the exact circumstances, Masseria needed to place loyal supporters in D'Aquila's stead, and he therefore gave his support to Mineo and Ferrigno. In late 1928, Mineo became the boss and Ferrigno the underboss of the old D'Aquila gang. The two men controlled approximately 400 to 500 Mafia soldiers with their most lucrative criminal interests in Brooklyn and Manhattan. After bootlegging, illegal gambling on horse races, numbers rackets, and the Italian lottery were the biggest money makers for the gang. In 1931, this gang was incorporated into the Mangano crime family, later to be called the Gambino crime family.

== Castellammarese War ==
While Ferrigno ran his criminal activities, a group of Sicilian mafiosi from Castellammare del Golfo led by Salvatore Maranzano began to challenge the authority of Ferrigno's benefactor, Masseria. Once the conflict known as the Castellammarese War officially broke out into open warfare by early 1930, there were deaths throughout America's Italian underworld.

== Death ==
On November 4, 1930, a meeting of Masseria supporters was held in Ferrigno's Bronx apartment at 759 Pelham Parkway South. In attendance were believed to be a number of top Masseria and Mineo crime family members, including Mineo, Charlie "Lucky" Luciano, Vito Genovese, Masseria, and Ferrigno himself.

Maranzano faction members including Joe Profaci, Nick Capuzzi, Joe Valachi and a hitman known only as Buster from Chicago were observing the meeting from an apartment Valachi had rented across the courtyard. According to Valachi, in the night of November 5, 1930, Steve Ferrigno and Al Mineo left the apartment and walked across the courtyard, and the Maranzano men mowed them down with gunfire.

Many organized crime historians and even a former Mafia boss, Joseph Bonanno dispute Valachi's claim that a top boss such as Joe Profaci would be directly involved in the assassination of an underworld rival. Masseria was killed in a Coney Island restaurant in early 1931, and Maranzano was himself killed in September, marking the end of the Castellammarese War. The main beneficiary (and organizer of both hits) was Charlie "Lucky" Luciano, who established himself at the top of the New York Mafia.

Ferrigno was buried in Calvary Cemetery in Woodside, Queens.

American Mafia
Unknown	Gambino crime family Underboss; 1928-1930	Succeeded by Albert Anastasia
