= Manfredi Mineo =

Italian-American mobster (1880-1930)

- Born: Manfredi Mineo; 1880; Palermo, Sicily, Italy
- Died: November 5, 1930 (aged 49–50); The Bronx, New York, U.S.
- Cause of death: Gunshot wounds
- Other names: Alfred, Al
- Occupations: Crime boss, mobster
- Predecessor: Salvatore D'Aquila
- Successor: Frank Scalice
- Allegiance: Mineo Crime Family

Manfredi "Al" or "Alfred" Mineo (Italian: [maɱˈfreːdi miˈnɛːo]; 1880 – November 5, 1930) was an Italian American mobster, who headed a strong American Mafia crime family during the Castellammarese War. Mineo's organization would eventually become the present-day Gambino crime family.

== Biography ==
=== Background ===
In the early part of the 20th century, New York had five Sicilian crime families. With the imprisonment of powerful Sicilian Mafia boss Giuseppe Morello in 1910, Salvatore D'Aquila, one of Morello's chief captains, immediately emerged as the new chief Mafia power in New York City, mostly in East Harlem and Little Italy (in southern Manhattan), but he also led a faction in Brooklyn that was headed locally by Mineo. D'Aquila had assumed the title from Morello of Capo di tutti capi or Boss of Bosses. D'Aquila's family, with Mineo's Brooklyn faction included, reigned supreme through the 1910s. However, upon the advent of prohibition other Mafia crime families and also non-mafia operations began to gain power and influence and cemented their positions around the city. One of these crime families was the former Morello crime family, which had been taken over by Joseph "Joe the Boss" Masseria around 1920. Former boss Giuseppe Morello was released from prison approximately the same time and quickly aligned himself with Joe Masseria against boss Toto D'Aquila and his underbosses, including Mineo.

=== D'Aquila family ===
Manfredi Mineo would continue his rise within the New York Mafia and eventually become D'Aquila's second in command or underboss of all his operations while still leading his own family in Brooklyn as a D'Aquila faction. As rivalries and animosity grew between the D'Aquila and Masseria families, Mineo would eventually find himself in a precarious position. D'Aquila had previously sentenced Morello to death upon his release from prison, along with his ally Umberto Valenti, but through the gentle intervention of Pittsburgh Mafia leader, Nicola Gentile, the death sentence on Morello and Valenti was revoked. With Valenti now in his debt, D'Aquila used this opportunity to recruit the feared Mafia leader in order to oppose the new Masseria-Morello alliance. Al Mineo faced the chance of losing power and influence within the D'Aquila crime family to Valenti, but in 1922 Valenti was murdered by Masseria-Morello forces. By the mid-1920s Mineo and his top lieutenant Steve Ferrigno began to assess their position within the D'Aquila organization and understood at this time that the new power in New York was Joe Masseria, so Mineo secretly began to align himself with Masseria.

=== Family takeover ===
On October 10, 1928, while standing next to his car, D'Aquila was murdered by gunmen. Mineo, who had recently aligned himself with boss Joe Masseria, more than likely played a direct role in planning the murder of his boss. After declaring his allegiance to Masseria and showing his distorted loyalty by betraying his former boss, Mineo's place atop the D'Aquila crime family leadership was cemented. He had secured his Brooklyn interests and would now command one of the larger Manhattan-based Mafia groups in New York. With Ferrigno as his second in command based in the Bronx, the Mineo crime family would control a number of rackets: bootlegging, gambling, numbers and extortion.

=== Castellammarese War ===
Strong rivalries continued between various New York Mafia crime families and factions, the most heated rivalry being the one between Mineo's Manhattan-based allies in the Masseria crime family and those in the Brooklyn-based Castellammarese clan, a group of mafiosi from the Sicilian seaside town of Castellammare del Golfo, who rose to prominence during Prohibition and would become extremely independent and eventually oppose the dominance of boss Joe Masseria and his supporters such as Mineo. The rivalries and animosities between the two groups would eventually come to a head and a war within the Italian underworld would erupt and drag every Mafia crime family and faction in New York into the conflict.

What became known as the Castellammarese War began in early 1930 and dragged on for the better part of two years, as New York Mafia leaders Joe Masseria and Salvatore Maranzano fought for dominance over the New York rackets. Mineo felt secure being aligned with Joe Masseria, who led the most powerful New York Mafia crime family and was recognized as the most influential crime boss in the city. The Masseria-Mineo alliance quickly gained the upper hand in the war as their forces began to move on Castellammarese-controlled territories and rackets members, eliminating rivals at every opportunity, but on August 15, 1930, the tide began to change when Masseria's top advisor and war chief, Giuseppe Morello, was killed. Mineo was named Masseria's new war chief and strategist and quickly surmised that the Castellammarese were gaining more support and more ground as the war dragged on. Mineo felt the only solution was to find and kill Maranzano before he could kill Masseria, this being the only sensible solution to ending the war and re-establishing dominance over the New York Mafia.

=== Death ===
On November 5, 1930, Mineo and his lieutenant Stefano Ferrigno were murdered in the courtyard of an apartment building on Pelham Parkway in the Bronx. Earlier in the week, several Maranzano gunmen had rented a first floor apartment in the building. Their actual target was Masseria, who had been observed entering the building earlier in the week. However, when the gunmen saw Mineo and Ferrigno in the garden, they seized the opportunity and shot both of them from the apartment window.

After Mineo's death, Francesco "Frank" Scalice became crime family boss. He immediately switched allegiance from Masseria to Maranzano, who was emerging as the winner in the gang war. It has been theorized that Scalise had arranged a secret deal with Maranzano to kill Mineo and become the organization boss, but Maranzano forces were able to eliminate Mineo without Scalise's help. On April 15, 1931, Joe Masseria was shot and killed in a Coney Island restaurant and the Castellammarese War was over.

No person was ever charged in the Mineo murder. In 1963, government witness Joseph Valachi claimed that Girolamo Santuccio was one of the gunmen.

== See also ==
- Castellammarese War

American Mafia
Preceded by Salvatore D'Aquila	Gambino crime family Boss; 1928–1930	Succeeded by Frank Scalice
