= Joseph Catania =

American mobster murdered during the Castellammarese War (1931)

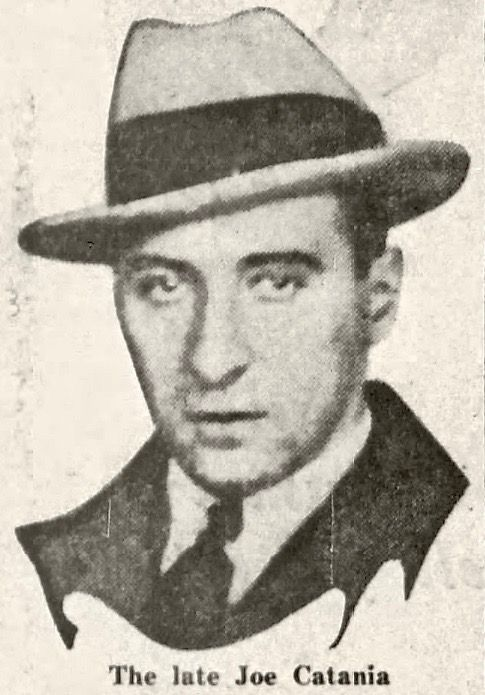
Giuseppe Catania

Giuseppe "Joe the Baker" Catania was a Sicilian-born American mobster murdered during the Castellammarese War of 1931 in New York City.

== Early life ==
Giuseppe was born October 1, 1902, in Palermo, Sicily to Antonio Catania and Francesca La Scala. He emigrated to New York City with his parents and older brother in 1903. By 1905 the family consisted of his parents, older brother Calogero (aka "James"), younger brother Andrew, grandparents Calogero Catania and Anna Montala' Catania, and aunts Antonette Catania and Josephine Catania. His father ran a Manhattan bakery, and Giuseppe became known as "Joseph" and "Joe the Baker" in later years.

== Organized crime ==
External videos
- Organized Crime in America. Synopsis of the criminal life of Joe "the Baker" Catania, Nov 3, 2022, YouTube

Giuseppe and Calogero became followers of their uncle Ciro Terranova and the Morello crime family. During Prohibition he took control of the Italian bread industry in the Bronx and achieved some level of notoriety when it was revealed a judicial officer "had been friendly with Terranova and Joseph Catania for years and socialized with them...through the Tepecano Club" and may have been a middleman in judicial corruption.

In 1930 two separate organized crime factions began attacking each other. Known as the Castellammarese War, it pitted mobsters allied to Salvatore Maranzano against those allied with Joe Masseria. Catania was allied with the latter, had been hijacking Maranano's liquor trucks and ultimately was shot by Maranzano loyalists in front of a candy store in the Bronx on Feb. 3, 1931. His death may have been engineered to bring a speedy conclusion to the Castellammarese War, and he died two days later at Fordham Hospital in New York City. Terranova funded an elaborate funeral, with forty cars to carry the floral displays. He is buried at old St. Raymond's cemetery in the Bronx.
