= James Squillante =

American mobster

- James Squillante
- Born: Vincent James Squillante; June 7, 1919
- Disappeared: September 23, 1960 (aged 41)
- Status: Missing for 65 years, 9 months and 5 days
- Other name: "Jimmy Jerome"
- Occupation: Gangster

Vincent James Squillante, also known as Jimmy Jerome (June 7, 1919 – disappeared September 30, 1960), was an American mobster who belonged to the Gambino crime family in New York and was known as "king of the garbage collection racket". Squillante also worked as an assassin for mob boss Albert "Mad Hatter" Anastasia.

== Biography ==
Squillante was born to Luigi and Bedelia Alberti, one of two sons, the other being Nunzio and seven sisters. He married Theresa Scialabba in 1949 and fathered one child, Bedelia. He divorced Theresa in 1951 and married Olivia Hughes and fathered two daughters with her, Donna and Olivia. He is the uncle to mobster Jerry Mancuso.

In 1963, Government informant Joe Valachi claimed that Squillante participated in the 1957 slaying of Anastasia underboss Frank "Don Cheech" Scalise. After the murder, Scalise's brother Joe publicly declared that he would avenge Frank's death. However, the Gambino family did not support Joe's declaration, possibly due to Anastasia's opposition. As a result, Joe was forced into hiding for several months until the family ostensibly forgave him. On September 7, 1957, according to Valachi, Squillante invited Joe to his house. Once Joe arrived, Squillante and several others murdered him, dismembered his body, loaded the remains onto one of Squillante's garbage trucks, and dumped them.

In fall 1960, Squillante was indicted on extortion charges. Reportedly, the Gambino family worried that Squillante could not handle the upcoming trial and probable prison sentence. So, to "put him out of his misery," the family ordered Squillante's death. On September 30, 1960, Squillante disappeared. According to some accounts, Squillante was handcuffed alive to the steering wheel of a rusty Chevrolet and the car was moved into a baling press type compactor. The metal was then melted down in an open hearth furnace. However, some newspaper accounts of that period claim that Squillante was seen on September 30 at 2 a.m. driving around the Bronx in his brother-in-law's car. Squillante's body was never found and no murder suspects were ever arrested.

== See also ==
- List of fugitives from justice who disappeared

== Notes and references ==
=== General references ===
- Devito, Carlo. Encyclopedia of International Organized Crime. New York: Facts On File, Inc., 2005. ISBN 978-0-8160-4848-9
- Fox, Stephen. Blood and Power: Organized Crime in Twentieth-Century America. New York: William Morrow and Company, 1989. ISBN 978-0-688-04350-6
- Kelly, Robert J. Encyclopedia of Organized Crime in the United States. Westport, Connecticut: Greenwood Press, 2000. ISBN 978-0-313-30653-2
- Sifakis, Carl. The Mafia Encyclopedia. New York: Da Capo Press, 2005. ISBN 978-0-8160-5694-1
- Sifakis, Carl. The Encyclopedia of American Crime. New York: Facts on File Inc., 2001. ISBN 978-0-8160-4040-7
- Mafia: The Government's Secret File On Organized Crime
