= Menfi =

- Comune
- Comune di Menfi
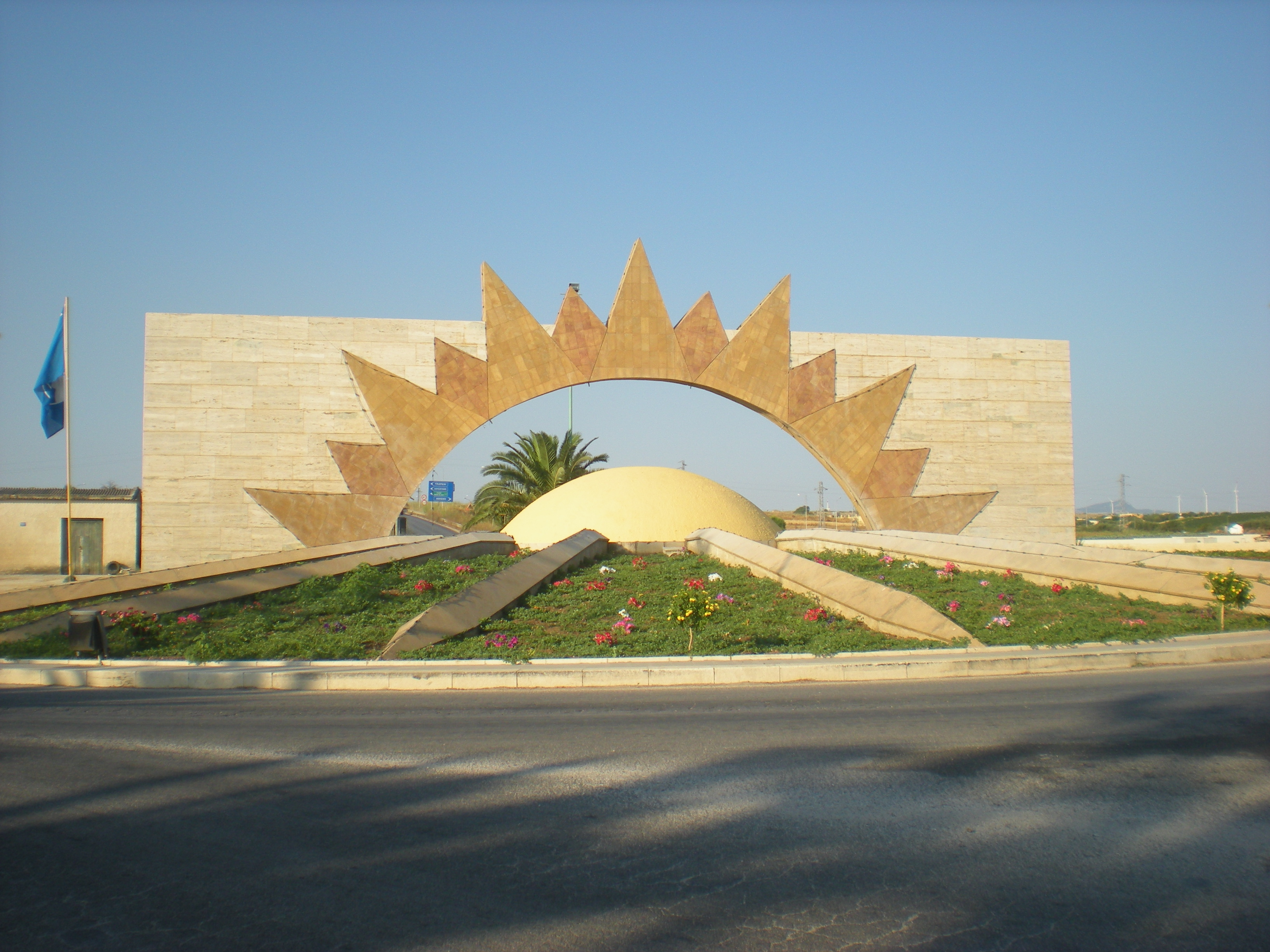
- The entrance gate to Menfi

- Coat of arms

- Location within Italy Location within Sicily
- Coordinates: 37°36′N 12°58′E
- Country: Italy
- Region: Sicily
- Province: Agrigento (AG)
- Frazioni: Porto Palo, Lido Fiori, Capparrina, Bertolino di Mare

Government
  - Mayor: Vito Antonio Clemente

Area
  - Total: 113.58 km^{2} (43.85 sq mi)
- Elevation: 109 m (358 ft)

Population (31 August 2022)
  - Total: 11,681
  - Density: 102.84/km^{2} (266.36/sq mi)
- Demonym: Menfitani
- Time zone: UTC+1 (CET)
  - Summer (DST): UTC+2 (CEST)
- Postal code: 92013
- Dialing code: 0925
- Patron saint: St. Anthony
- Saint day: 13 June
- Website: Official website

Menfi is a comune (municipality) in the Province of Agrigento in the Italian region Sicily, located about 70 kilometres (43 mi) southwest of Palermo and about 60 kilometres (37 mi) northwest of Agrigento.

The town lies some 3 kilometres (2 mi) from the south coast of Sicily, between the rivers Belice and Carboj. In 1910, a full third of the population of the town of Menfi had emigrated to the United States. Other major recipients were Argentina, Brazil, and Venezuela.

== Main sights ==
- A tower (Torre Federiciana), which is the remains of a medieval castle built by Frederick II of Hohenstaufen in 1238, perhaps over an Arab fortification.
- Chiesa Madre ("Mother Church"), built in the 18th century but destroyed by an earthquake in 1968. It was later rebuilt.
- Church of St. Joseph (1715).

The remains of an Iron Age prehistoric settlement were found in the 1980s outside of the town.

== Twin towns ==
- Canelli, Italy, since 1997
- Chivilcoy, Argentina, since 1999
- Ettlingen, Germany, since 2004

== Notable people ==
Joe Masseria, former Boss of the Genovese Crime Family
