= Puggy (disambiguation) =

Puggy may refer to:

== Persons ==
- Irving "Puggy" Feinstein (ca. 1910–1939), New York mobster
- Puggy Hunton (1902–1967), American football coach
- Puggy Pearson (1929–2006), American professional poker player

== Music ==
- Puggy, Belgian musical band

== Fictional characters ==
- Puggy, a fictional character in novel Big Trouble

== Other uses ==
- Puggy, Scottish slang for a slot machine
