= Nicola Gentile =

Member of the Sicilian Mafia

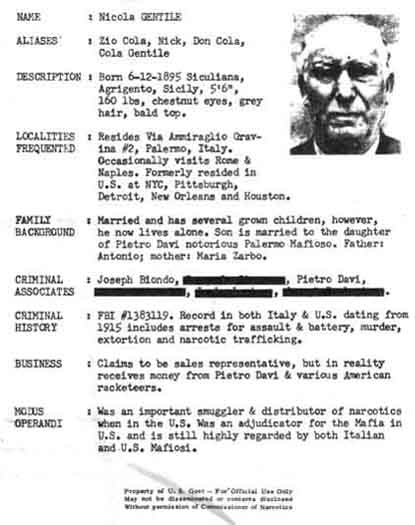
- Nick Gentile's Bureau of Narcotics file
- Born: June 12, 1885; Siculiana, Sicily, Kingdom of Italy
- Died: November 6, 1966 (aged 81); Siculiana, Italy
- Other name: Zu Cola
- Known for: Writing memoirs about his time in the Mafia
- Allegiance: Sicilian Mafia

Nicola Gentile (Italian pronunciation: [niˈkɔːla dʒenˈtiːle]; June 12, 1885 – November 6, 1966), also known as Nick Gentile, was a Sicilian mafioso and an organized crime figure in New York City during the 1920s and 1930s. He was also known for publishing his memoirs which, violating the mafiosi code known as omerta, revealed many details of the Sicilian and American underworld. Gentile was born in Siculiana, a small village on the south coast of Sicily in the province of Agrigento. He immigrated to the United States arriving in New York at age 18, in 1903. Gentile fled the country in 1937 while out on $15,000 bail after an arrest for heroin trafficking and returned to Sicily to become a boss in the Sicilian Cosa Nostra. In the US, he was known as "Nick" and in Sicily as "Zu Cola" (Uncle Cola).

== Arrival in the United States ==
Gentile immigrated to the United States in 1903, where he quickly associated with the Black Hand during the early 20th century, Gentile would become a leader in America's early mafia and would later serve as a confidant for New York mobsters throughout the early part of the 20th century up until the Castellammarese War and the subsequent formation of New York's Five Families under Charles "Lucky" Luciano in 1931. Gentile traveled the country as a troubleshooter and negotiator, known as the messaggero or substituto, relaying messages between crime families and mediating disputes and became part of the New York Mafia Family led by Vincent Mangano and Joe Biondo, which later became known as the Gambino Family.

During Prohibition, Gentile was briefly involved in bootlegging as head of criminal syndicates in Kansas City, Cleveland and Pittsburgh. In 1920, there was an attempt made on his life by his rival in Cleveland, mafia boss Joseph "Big Joe" Lonardo.

Gentile left for Sicily soon after, but not before he met with his New York allies. He decided to align himself against New York mafia bosses Salvatore "Totò" D'Aquila and Umberto Valenti and backed mafia boss Giuseppe "Joe the Boss" Masseria in his bid to gain control of the Morello crime family in which Masseria was the Capo running Little Italy for the family.

After several months in Sicily, Gentile returned to the United States. Mauro and Valenti had been gunned down by Masseria forces in 1922, ending the conflict and making Joe Masseria one of the top mafia bosses in New York. Gentile continued his criminal career in New York now aligning himself with the group of Charles "Lucky" Luciano. Gentile became involved with Luciano's narcotics operations. He was arrested in New Orleans in 1937 on drug charges. Soon after his arrest Gentile fled the country while out on $15,000 bail and returned to Sicily.

== Return to Sicily ==
Back in Sicily, he settled in Palermo, where he ran a fabric shop, and remained there until 1943, when bombings forced him to move to his wife's village, Raffadali near Agrigento. Gentile rose to a high-level position in the Sicilian Mafia. His power and influence grew after the Allied invasion of Sicily in 1943 (Operation Husky) as he helped the military set up its civil administration – the Allied Military Government of Occupied Territories (AMGOT) – in Raffadali in the Agrigento province, at first as an interpreter and then from positions of greater responsibility, before returning to Palermo to render his services there. Arrested, he was soon freed through the intercession of a special services lieutenant. He became involved in intelligence and the Sicilian separatist movement.

Gentile claimed to have been approached by U.S. special agent Max Brod to support the monarchy in the referendum on June 2, 1946. Later, he became an important canvasser for politicians from the Christian Democrat party (Democrazia Cristiana, DC), who quarrelled for his support. Gentile later supported Christian Democrat Giuseppe La Loggia, who would become president of the autonomous region of Sicily from 1956 to 1958.

When Lucky Luciano was extradited to Italy in 1946, he once again teamed up with Gentile in organizing drug routes to the US. Gentile had very good connections with well-known drug traffickers in Sicily. His son was married to the daughter of Pietro Davì, one of the leading figures in cigarette smuggling and illicit drug trade in Palermo in the 1950s. Gentile and Luciano met New York gangster Joe Biondo in 1949. Biondo supervised the Gambino Family's heroin traffic. Throughout the 1950s and 1960s, Gentile continued to remain a prominent figure in the Sicilian underworld. He was erroneously believed by some to have replaced Calogero Vizzini as the head of the Sicilian Mafia.

During the 1960s, Gentile provided information to the KGB, through journalist Leonid Kolosov. Gentile revealed the existence of Piano Solo, a 1964 plan for an anti-communist coup in Italy with the involvement of the Italian intelligence agency SIFAR, the Carabinieri armed forces, and the CIA. Kolosov passed on these revelations to the journalists Eugenio Scalfari and Lino Jannuzzi, who publicly disclosed them in the magazine L'Espresso in May 1967.

== Memoirs ==
Cover of Nicola Gentile memoirs "Vita Di Capomafia"

In 1963 Gentile wrote down his memoirs, "Vita Di Capomafia", with the help of Italian journalist Felice Chilanti. Gentile approached the journalist Chilanti, who was one of the top investigative journalist of L'Ora that pioneered in investigating the Mafia. Chilanti agreed and interviewed Gentile for L'Ora, before writing down Gentile's memoirs. (Note: The contents of the memoirs in the book and the series of interviews of Chilanti in L'Ora sometimes differs substantially.)

The long forgotten book described the internal organization of the Mafia, or "l'onorata società" (the Honoured Society) as Gentile called it, more than 20 years before Tommaso Buscetta emerged as the important first pentito who broke with omertà and told Cosa Nostra's inside story. Gentile was already more explicit than Buscetta in his first confessions. Gentile undiffidently talked about his links with politicians for whom he acted as a canvasser.

According to crime reporter Hank Messick, a resentful Gentile confessed to the FBI. In fact, his memoirs were for sale in every bookshop in Italy. The FBI used Gentile's information to corroborate the testimony of former mobster turned government informant Joe Valachi in 1963. The memoirs were shown to American Mafia turncoat Joe Valachi who vouched for its accuracy and said Gentile 'wrote just the way it is'.

Gentile's fellow mafiosi did not appreciate his candor and sentenced him to death, but the Catania Mafia clan who had to kill him declined to do so, according to pentito Antonio Calderone. At the end of his days, Gentile was a pitiful figure who only survived through the pasta which his neighbors gave him.

Gentile died on November 6, 1966, at the age of 81.
