= Filippo Buccola =

Italian-American gangster

Filippo "Philip" Buccola (August 6, 1886 – October, 1987) was an Italian-American mobster. He was also a professional boxing manager. Buccola belonged to what later became known as the Patriarca crime family, based in Boston, Massachusetts.

== Biography ==
Buccola was born in Palermo, Sicily, Italy. He immigrated to the United States at age 32. He succeeded Gaspare Messina as the boss of what later became known as the Patriarca crime family, with Joe Lombardo (not to be confused with the Chicago Outfit member of the same name) acting as his underboss. During 1954, while under pressure from U.S. government agencies, Buccola returned to Sicily, turning over leadership of his crime family to Raymond Patriarca, leading to the renaming of the family to the "Patriarca" crime family.

== Death ==
Buccola died aged 101, in his birth-place city of Palermo.
