= Isadore Friedman =

American mobster (d. 1939)

Isadore or Irving Friedman (died January 28, 1939), also known under the alias Danny Field, was a New York mobster and an associate of labor racketeer Louis "Lepke" Buchalter. He later agreed to testify against Buchalter on behalf of District Attorney Thomas E. Dewey as one of several high-profile witnesses scheduled to testify against Buchalter; however, he was murdered along with Louis Cohen on January 28, 1939, shortly before his court appearance. Jacob "Kuppy" Midgen was believed to be the killer.
