= Louis Cohen =

American mobster and murderer (1904-1939)

- Cohen, shortly after being taken into custody for the murder of Nathan Kaplan.
- Born: January 1, 1904
- Died: January 28, 1939 (aged 35); Manhattan, New York, United States
- Cause of death: Murder
- Resting place: Mount Hebron Cemetery
- Known for: New York mobster associated with labor racketeer Louis "Lepke" Buchalter who murdered rival "Kid Dropper" Nathan Kaplan in 1923.

Louis Cohen (Born Louis Kushner alias “Louis Kerzner” January 1, 1904 – January 28, 1939) was a New York mobster who murdered labor racketeer "Kid Dropper" Nathan Kaplan and was an associate of labor racketeer Louis "Lepke" Buchalter. He was killed along with Isadore Friedman, another Buchalter associate, who was believed to be an informant. It is not known whether Cohen was murdered for being a potential informant or whether he was accidentally killed during the shooting that was supposed to target Friedman.

== Biography ==
Born Louis Kushner aka Kerzner, Cohen was a minor criminal in the employ of racketeer Jacob "Little Augie" Orgen when he was hired by lieutenants Louis Buchalter, Jacob "Gurrah" Shapiro and Jack "Legs" Diamond to murder rival mobster Nathan Kaplan. He later killed him while under police escort outside the Essex Market Court House in lower Manhattan on August 28, 1923. Immediately arrested by police, he was subsequently convicted of Dropper's murder and sentenced to 20 years to life imprisonment at Sing Sing Prison. Released on parole in 1937, he was gunned down on January 28, 1939.
