= Clinton G. Price =

American politician

Clinton G. Price (January 3, 1875 – April 14, 1930) was an American lawyer and politician.

Born in Wonewoc, Wisconsin, Price graduated from Wonewoc High School. He worked on a farm, in a sawmill, was an American Express agent, and worked in a hardware store. Price also taught school and was the University of Wisconsin law librarian. Price served in the United States Army during the Spanish–American War and World War I. Price graduated from the University of Wisconsin and the University of Wisconsin Law School. He served as the city attorney of Mauston, Wisconsin, and then was appointed assistant district attorney for Milwaukee County, Wisconsin. Price returned to Juneau County and served as district attorney. In 1923 and 1925, Price served in the Wisconsin State Assembly and was a Republican. On April 13, 1930, Price was badly wounded at his house in Mauston, Wisconsin, when he was shot by an assailant. Price died early on April 14, 1930, at a hospital in Mauston while undergoing surgery. Mauston's police department was aided by several other agencies, and Lyall Wright, a former sheriff's deputy, was charged with Price's murder. It was believed Price was assassinated in retaliation for a raid on a bootlegger den near Kilbourn, Wisconsin. Wright was ultimately acquitted after a contested trial, and spent most of the rest of his life in prison for unrelated robbery charges.
