= Vincent Mangano =

Italian-American mobster

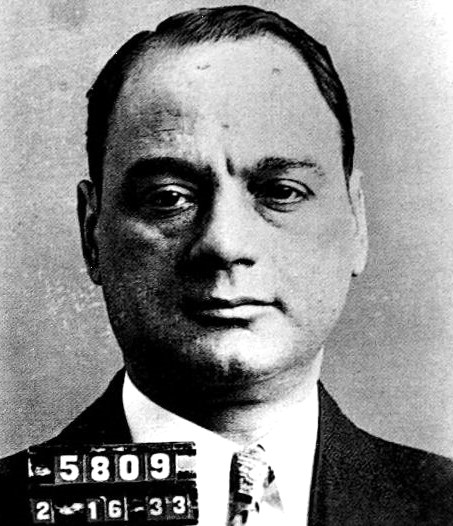
- Mugshot of Mangano in 1933
- Born: Vincenzo Giovanni Mangano; March 28, 1888; Palermo, Sicily, Kingdom of Italy
- Disappeared: April 19, 1951 (aged 63); New York, U.S.
- Status: Missing for 75 years, 6 months and 5 days; declared dead in absentia on October 30, 1961 (aged 73)
- Other name: "Vincent The Executioner"
- Occupation: Crime boss
- Predecessor: Frank Scalice
- Successor: Albert Anastasia
- Relatives: Philip Mangano (brother)
- Allegiance: Mangano crime family

Vincent Mangano (born Vincenzo Giovanni Mangano; Italian: [vinˈtʃɛntso dʒoˈvanni ˈmaŋɡano]; March 28, 1888 – disappeared April 19, 1951, declared dead October 30, 1961) was an Italian-born mobster also known as "Vincent the Executioner" as named in a Brooklyn newspaper, and the head of the Mangano crime family (later known as the Gambino crime family) from 1931 to 1951. He was the brother of Philip Mangano.

== Vince as head of the Gambino family ==
Mangano was named head of what was then the Mineo family in 1931, following the Castellammarese War. He was one of the original bosses of the modern Five Families, the others being Joseph Bonanno, Lucky Luciano, Joe Profaci and Tommy Gagliano.

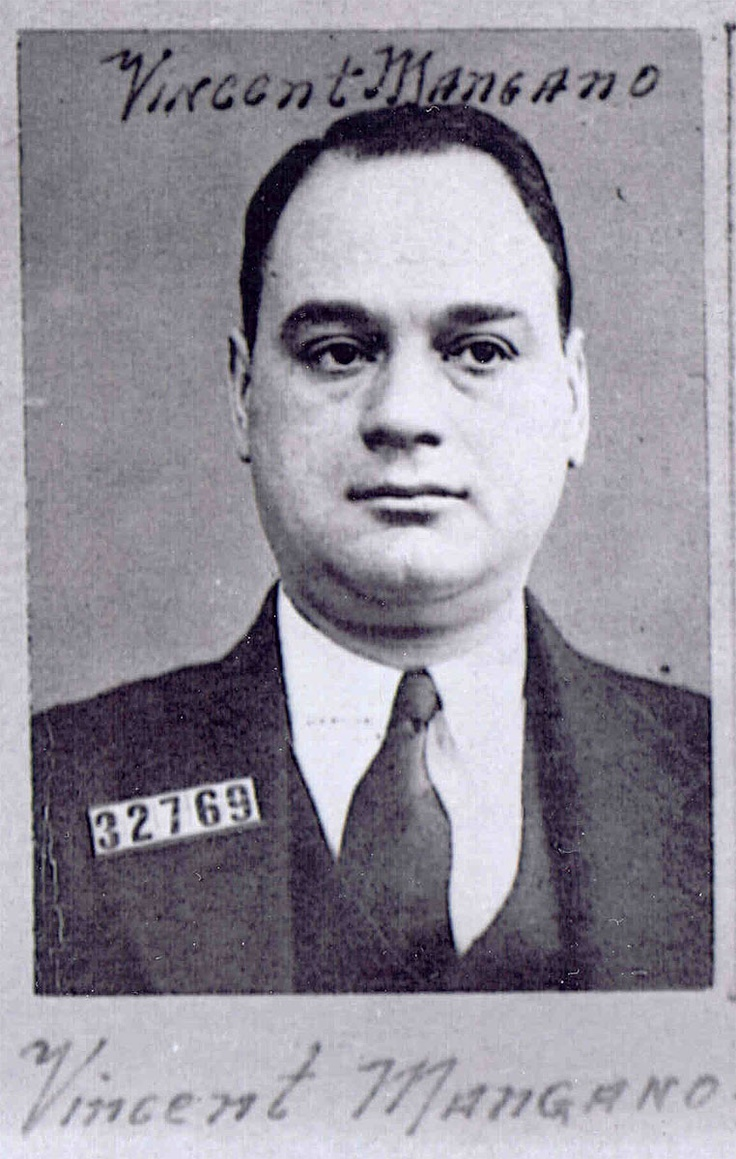
Vincent Mangano NYPD Mugshot #32769 5 January 1931

Mangano made the waterfront his family's main income producer. He and his associates would threaten to prevent cargo from being loaded or unloaded if the shipping company refused to pay a tribute. This effort was helped by the family's control of Brooklyn Local 1814 of the International Longshoremen's Association; its president, Anthony Anastasio, was a member of the family.

== Feud with Anastasia ==
Despite being a mob power in his own right, Albert Anastasia was nominally the underboss of the Mangano crime family, under Mangano. During his 20-year rule, Mangano had resented Anastasia's close ties to Luciano and Costello, particularly the fact that they had obtained Anastasia's services without first seeking Mangano's permission. This and other business disputes led to heated, almost physical fights between the two mobsters.

== Disappearance ==
Mangano's brother was found dead near Sheepshead Bay, Brooklyn on April 19, 1951. Vincent Mangano disappeared the same day. Both of them are believed to have been murdered on the orders of family underboss Albert Anastasia in Brooklyn as part of a coup in 1951. Vincent Mangano's body was never found, and he was declared dead 10 years later on October 30, 1961, by the Surrogate's Court in Brooklyn. No one was ever arrested in the Mangano homicides, but it was widely assumed that Anastasia had them killed.

== See also ==
- List of people who disappeared mysteriously: 1910–1990

American Mafia
Preceded by Frank Scalice	Gambino crime family Boss; 1931–1951	Succeeded by Albert Anastasia
Preceded by Lucky Luciano as chairman of the Commission	Capo di tutti capi Chairman of the Commission; 1946–1951	Succeeded by Frank Costello as chairman of the Commission
