= Philip Mangano =

American mobster

- Born: Filippo Mangano; April 13, 1898; Palermo, Sicily, Kingdom of Italy
- Died: April 19, 1951 (aged 53); New York, U.S.
- Cause of death: Multiple gunshot wounds
- Body discovered: April 19, 1951; Jamaica Bay, Brooklyn, New York
- Occupation: Mobster
- Relatives: Vincent Mangano (brother)
- Allegiance: Mangano crime family

Philip Mangano (born Filippo Mangano, Italian: [fiˈlippo ˈmaŋɡano]; April 13, 1898 – April 19, 1951) was an Italian-born caporegime and second consigliere in what was then the Mangano crime family in New York City and reigned consigliere for 20 years between 1931 and 1951 when his brother, Vincent, was boss.

Mangano was involved with the International Longshoremen's Association and in New York City politics.

In 1923, Mangano was indicted on murder charges, but was never convicted.

== Death ==
Mangano disappeared on April 19, 1951, six days after his 53rd birthday. That same day, a woman in a fishing boat discovered Philip Mangano's body in a marshland area of Jamaica Bay in Brooklyn while she had been walking through the tall grass. Mangano had been shot three times; once in the neck and twice in the face. He, along with his brother Vincent, who disappeared that same day, are believed to have been murdered on the orders of family underboss Albert Anastasia in Brooklyn in 1951. No one was ever arrested in the Mangano murders, but it was widely assumed that Anastasia had them killed.

== See also ==
- Lists of solved missing person cases
- List of unsolved murders (1900–1979)

American Mafia
Unknown	Gambino crime family Consigliere; 1931-1951	Succeeded by Joseph Biondo
