= Abraham Friedman =

American mobster (1897-1939)

Abraham "Whitey" Friedman (c. 1897 – April 25, 1939) was a New York mobster and former associate of Nathan "Kid Dropper" Kaplan and later for labor racketeers Louis "Lepke" Buchalter and Jacob "Gurrah" Shapiro as an enforcer in New York's garment district during the 1920s and 1930s. One of many former associates killed by Murder, Inc. on the orders of Buchalter, he had recently been called in for questioning by investigators with crusading District Attorney Thomas E. Dewey, and was gunned down as he was walking near his home on East 96th Street in Brooklyn during the early evening of April 25, 1939. Before his murder, Friedman was suspected of informing on Buchalter.
