= Salvatore D'Aquila =

Sicilian mobster

- Born: November 7, 1873; Palermo, Sicily, Italy
- Died: October 10, 1928 (aged 54); New York, New York, U.S.
- Cause of death: Gunshot wounds
- Resting place: St. John Cemetery, Queens, New York, U.S.
- Other name: "Toto"
- Occupations: Crime boss, mobster
- Predecessor: Ignazio Lupo
- Successor: Manfredi Mineo
- Allegiance: D'Aquila crime family

Salvatore "Toto" D'Aquila (Italian pronunciation: [salvaˈtoːre ˈdaːkwila]; November 7, 1873 – October 10, 1928) was an early Italian-American Mafia boss in New York City of the D'Aquila crime family, what would later become known as the Gambino crime family.

== Early life and career ==
Salvatore D'Aquila was born on November 7, 1873, in Palermo, Sicily, to Salvatore D'Aquila and his wife Provvidenza Gagliardo. D'Aquila emigrated to the United States in 1906 and became an early captain within the Morello crime family in East Harlem. D'Aquila was arrested in 1906 and in 1909; both times the charges were dropped. In 1910, boss of bosses Giuseppe "the Clutch Hand" Morello was imprisoned and Salvatore D'Aquila separated from the Morello family. D'Aquila formed his own crime family and was appointed the new capo dei capi. His crime family operated from East Harlem and the Bronx, where he rivaled the Morellos.

D'Aquila expanded his crime family's power into Brooklyn and southern Manhattan's Lower East Side/Little Italy neighborhoods. The most prominent members of the D'Aquila family were Umberto Valenti, Manfredi Mineo, Giuseppe Traina, and Frank Scalise. In 1920, after Giuseppe Morello was released from prison, D'Aquila tried to have him and his closest allies murdered. On his orders, Umberto Valenti killed Morello/Terranova crime family boss Vincenzo Terranova and his underboss Silva Tagliagamba. D'Aquila's men also twice tried to kill Joe Masseria, a high ranking member of the gang, but narrowly failed both times. The incidents gained Masseria new respect among gangsters as "the man who can dodge bullets" and his reputation began to rise as D'Aquila's began to wane. Eventually, Masseria and his men struck back and had Valenti killed in August 1922. With Valenti gone, D'Aquila's power began to lose its luster of invulnerability. Masseria became the new boss of the family, with Giuseppe Morello serving as consigliere. In 1925, D'Aquila moved back into the Bronx.

== Death ==
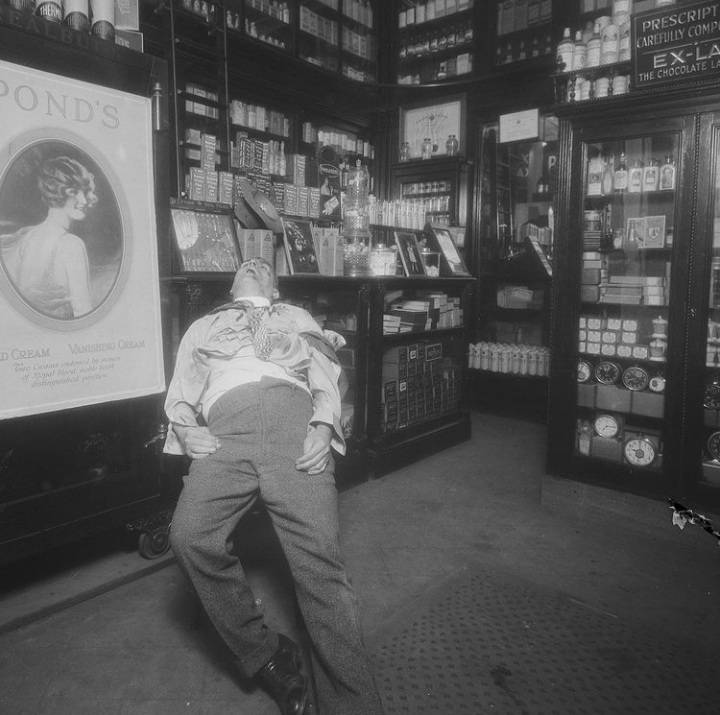
Salvatore D'Aquila October 1928, after being shot between 5 and 9 times at his car, his body was dragged into a doctor or drug store office, depending on the source.

After losing the gang war and several allies, D'Aquila became vulnerable. On October 10, 1928, D'Aquila was shot dead on Avenue A in Manhattan, aged 54, allegedly on Joe Masseria's orders. After his murder, D'Aquila's family was taken over by Manfredi Mineo.

== See also ==
- Black Hand (extortion)

American Mafia
New title Crime family established by D'Aquila	Gambino crime family Boss; 1910–1928	Succeeded by Manfredi Mineo
Preceded by Sebastiano DiGaetano	Capo dei capi Boss of bosses 1912–1928	Succeeded by Joe Masseria
