= Castellammarese War =

Italian-American Mafia war, 1930–1931

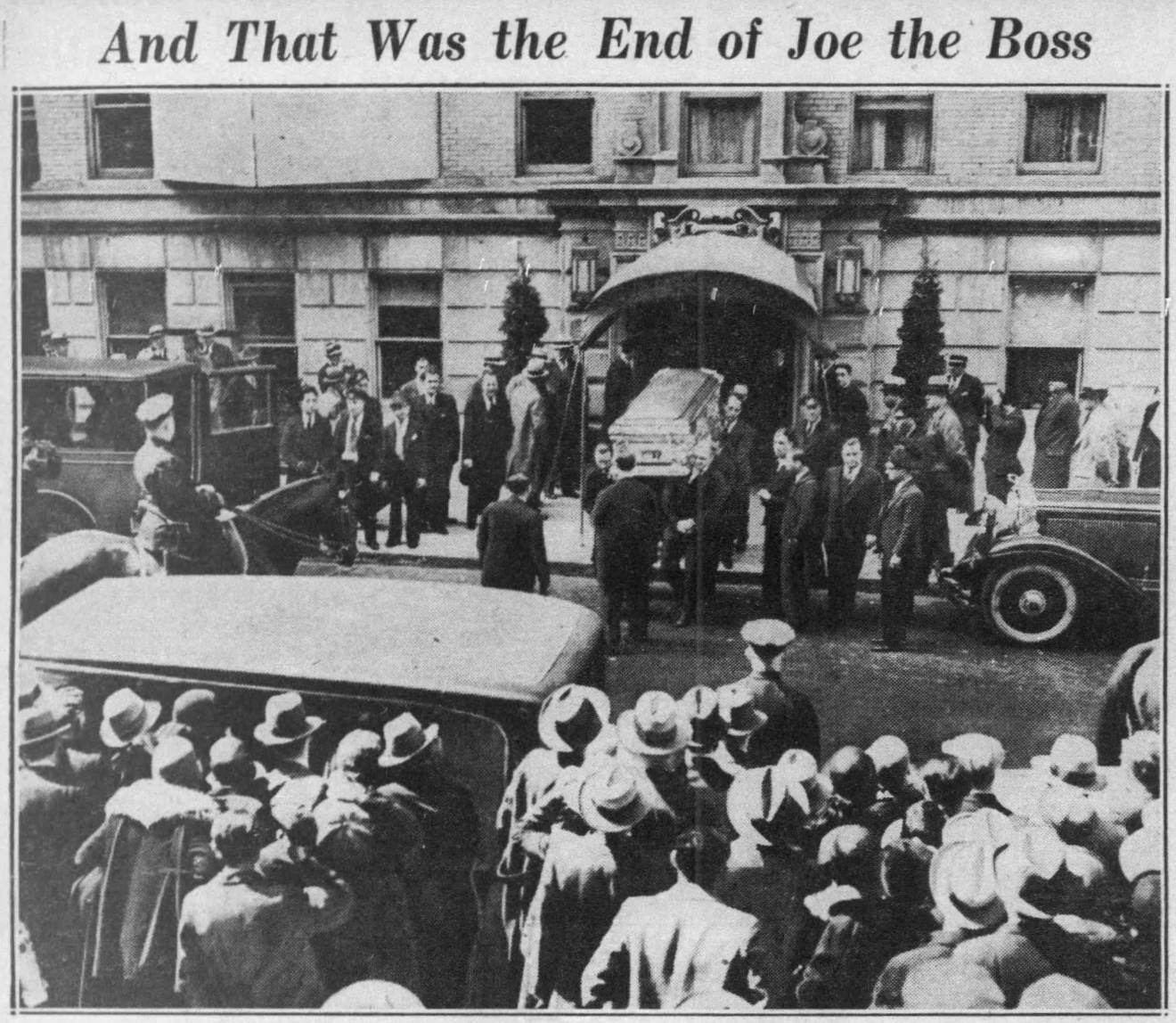
- The funeral of Joe Masseria in New York City, 20 April 1931 (Daily News, 1931)
- Date: February 26, 1930 – April 15, 1931
- Location: New York City, New York, U.S.
- Caused by: Crime syndicate control dispute
- Result: Maranzano's faction's victory: Creation of the Five Families; Maranzano; Profaci; Mangano; Luciano; Gagliano; Salvatore Maranzano declares himself Capo di tutti i capi

Parties
American Mafia Masseria's faction	American Mafia Maranzano's faction

Lead figures
Joe Masseria †; Giuseppe Morello †; Lucky Luciano; Al Capone; Albert Anastasia; Vito Genovese; Manfredi Mineo †; Willie Moretti; Joe Adonis; Frank Costello; Carlo Gambino	Salvatore Maranzano; Joseph Bonanno; Vito Bonventre †; Stefano Magaddino; Joe Profaci; Joe Aiello †; Gaetano Reina †; Tommy Gagliano; Tommy Lucchese; Nicolo Schiro

The Castellammarese War (Italian pronunciation: [kaˌstɛllammaˈreːze, -eːse]) was a bloody power struggle for control of the American Mafia between partisans of Joe "The Boss" Masseria and Salvatore Maranzano in New York City from February 26, 1930, until April 15, 1931. The feud was named after the Sicilian town of Castellammare del Golfo, Maranzano's birthplace.

Maranzano's faction prevailed in the conflict and divided New York's crime families into the Five Families. Maranzano declared himself capo di tutti i capi ("boss of all bosses"). Maranzano was murdered in September 1931 on orders of Lucky Luciano, who established a power-sharing arrangement through a governing body called the Commission, giving equal stature to all Mafia families to avoid such feuds in the future.

== Background ==
In the late 1920s, the most important and profitable Mafia operations in the United States were controlled by Giuseppe "Joe The Boss" Masseria in New York City. Masseria emerged as the most powerful gangster in the city after the 1928 killing of his main rival Salvatore D'Aquila, following a protracted gang war. In 1929, Masseria began applying pressure to other mafia gangs in the city for monetary tributes, and established alliances with Mafia groups from outside of New York. His faction consisted mainly of gangsters from Sicily, Calabria (the 'Ndrangheta) and Campania (the Camorra) in southern Italy. Masseria's faction included Charles "Lucky" Luciano, Albert "Mad Hatter" Anastasia, Vito Genovese, Alfred Mineo, Willie Moretti, Joe Adonis and Frank Costello.

However, powerful Sicilian Don Vito Ferro decided to make a bid for the control of Mafia operations, sending Salvatore Maranzano from his base in Castellammare del Golfo to seize control. The Castellammarese faction in the U.S. included Joseph "Joe Bananas" Bonanno, Stefano "The Undertaker" Magaddino, Joseph Profaci and Joe Aiello.

As part of his attempts to consolidate control in New York, Joe Masseria forced the resignation of Castellammarese boss Nicolo Schiro. Soon after, he organized the murder of his close ally Vito Bonventre, who was killed at his home on July 15, 1930. This led to Maranzano being elevated to boss of the gang, setting the stage for an open confrontation with Masseria. As it became more evident that the two factions would clash for the leadership of the Mafia, they each sought to recruit more followers to support them.

Outwardly, the Castellammarese War was between the forces of Masseria and Maranzano. Underneath, there was also a generational conflict between the old-guard Sicilian leadership—known as the "Mustache Petes" for their long mustaches and old-world ways, such as refusing to do business with non-Italians—and the "Young Turks", a younger and more diverse Italian-American group who, unlike the "Mustache Petes", had grown up in the U.S., were more forward-thinking and were willing to work with non-Italians. While Masseria was powerful and respected, his aggressive expansion made turf wars inevitable. This approach led to several of Masseria's followers to question whether he was capable of making the Mafia prosper in the world of the 1930s. Led by Luciano, the aim of this group was to end the feud as soon as possible in order to resume their businesses, viewing the conflict as unnecessary.

Luciano's objective was to modernize the mob and do away with unnecessary orthodox norms. This vision enabled Luciano to attract followers, who saw the inadequacies of Masseria's traditionalist leadership. Therefore, both factions were fluid, with many mobsters switching sides or killing their own allies during the feud. Tensions between the Masseria and Maranzano factions were evident as far back as 1928, with one side frequently hijacking the other's alcohol trucks, with alcohol production being illegal in the U.S. at that time due to Prohibition.

== Hostilities begin ==
As the feud became more violent, gunmen clashed on the streets of New York City. According to Bonanno, in February 1930 Masseria ordered the death of Gaspar Milazzo, a Castellammarese native who was the president of Detroit's chapter of Unione Siciliana. Masseria had reportedly been humiliated by Milazzo's refusal to support him in a Unione Siciliana dispute involving the Chicago Outfit and Al Capone.

The opening salvo in the feud was fired within the Masseria faction when, on February 26, 1930, Masseria ordered the murder of an ally, Gaetano Reina. Masseria gave the job to a young Genovese, who killed Reina with a shotgun. Masseria's intent was to protect his secret allies Tommy Gagliano, Tommy Lucchese and Dominick "The Gap" Petrilli.

Later his treachery would come back to haunt him, as the Reina family then threw its support behind Maranzano. Vito Bonventre also became a target, as Castellammarese-born members of Nicolo Schiro's gang began to threaten Masseria's domination over Mafia gangs. Masseria forced Schiro to pay him US$10,000 (approximately US$170,000 in 2022) and step down as boss of the gang. On July 15, 1930, Bonventre was gunned down outside his garage.

== Trading blows ==
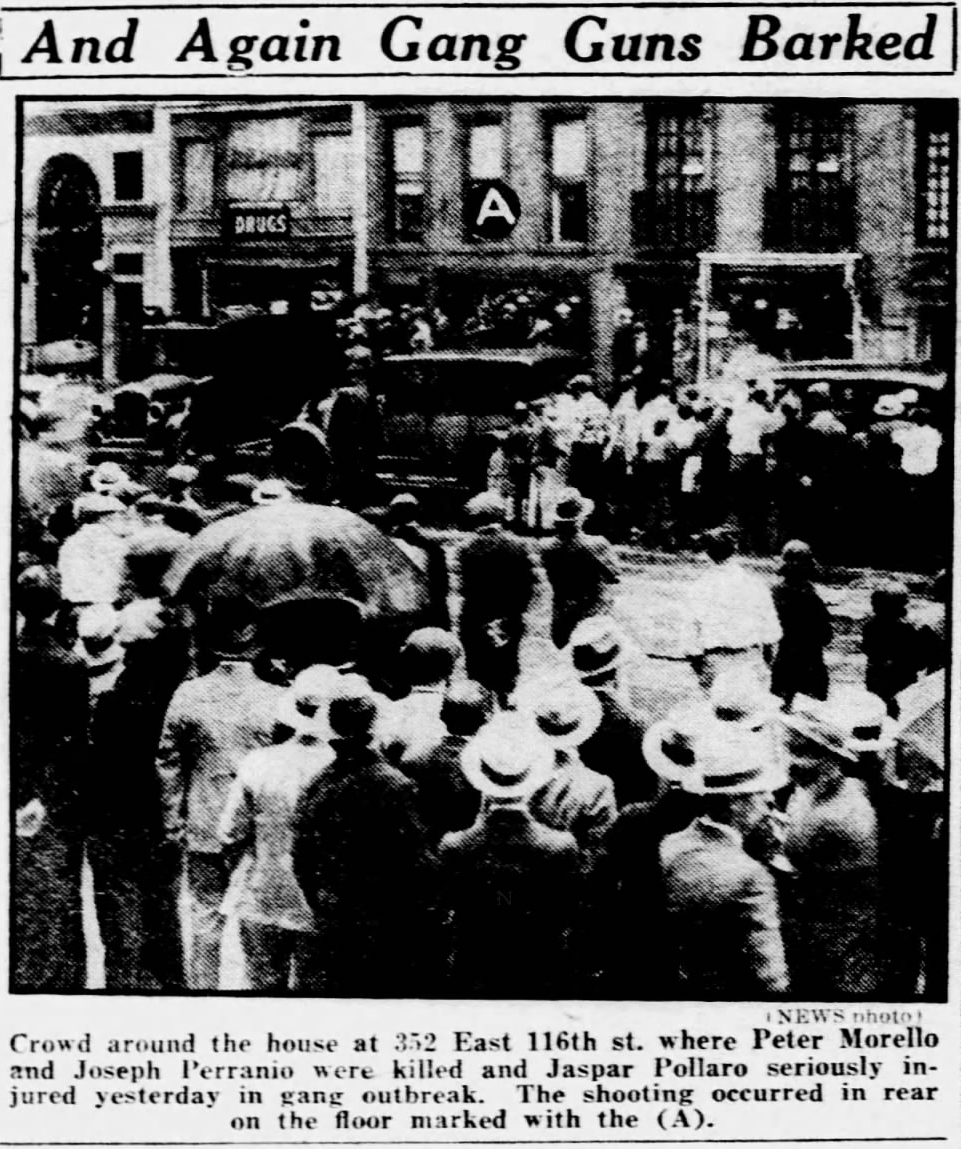
Reaction to the murder of Giuseppe Morello (here identified under his nickname "Peter") from the multi-page story in the August 16, 1930 New York Daily News

On August 15, 1930, Castellammarese loyalists executed a key Masseria enforcer, Giuseppe Morello, at Morello's East Harlem office (a visitor, Giuseppe Peraino, was also killed). Two weeks later, Masseria suffered another blow. After Reina's murder, Masseria had appointed Joseph Pinzolo to take over the ice-distribution racket. However, on September 9, the Reina family shot and killed Pinzolo at a Times Square office rented by Lucchese. After these two murders, the Reina crew formally joined forces with the Castellammarese.

Masseria soon struck back. On October 23, 1930, Castellammarese ally Joe Aiello, president of the Chicago Unione Siciliane, was murdered in Chicago.

== The tide turns ==
Following the murder of Aiello, the tide of feud rapidly turned in favor of the Castellammarese. On November 5, 1930, Al Mineo and a key member of Masseria's gang, Steve Ferrigno, were murdered. Francesco Scalice inherited control of Mineo's gang and subsequently defected to the Maranzano faction. At this point, many other members of Masseria's gang also began defecting to Maranzano, rendering the original battle lines of the conflict (Castellammarese versus non-Castellammarese) meaningless. On February 3, 1931, another important Masseria lieutenant, Joseph Catania, was gunned down, dying two days later.

Given the worsened situation, Masseria allies Luciano and Genovese started communicating with Castellammarese leader Maranzano. The two men agreed to betray Masseria if Maranzano would end the feud. A deal was struck, based on which Luciano would arrange for Masseria to be murdered and Maranzano would bring the Castellammarese War to an end. On April 15, 1931, Masseria was killed at Nuova Villa Tammaro, a restaurant in Coney Island, Brooklyn. While they played cards, Luciano allegedly excused himself to the bathroom, with the gunmen reportedly being Anastasia, Genovese, Joe Adonis and Benjamin "Bugsy" Siegel; Ciro "The Artichoke King" Terranova drove the getaway car, but legend has it that he was too shaken up to drive away and had to be shoved out of the driver's seat by Siegel.

However, according to The New York Times, "[A]fter that, the police have been unable to learn definitely [what happened]". Reputedly Masseria was "seated at a table playing cards with two or three unknown men" when he was fired upon from behind. He died from gunshot wounds to his head, back and chest. Masseria's autopsy report shows that he died on an empty stomach. No witnesses came forward, though "two or three" men were observed leaving the restaurant and getting into a stolen car. No one was convicted in Masseria's murder.

== The new Mafia structure ==
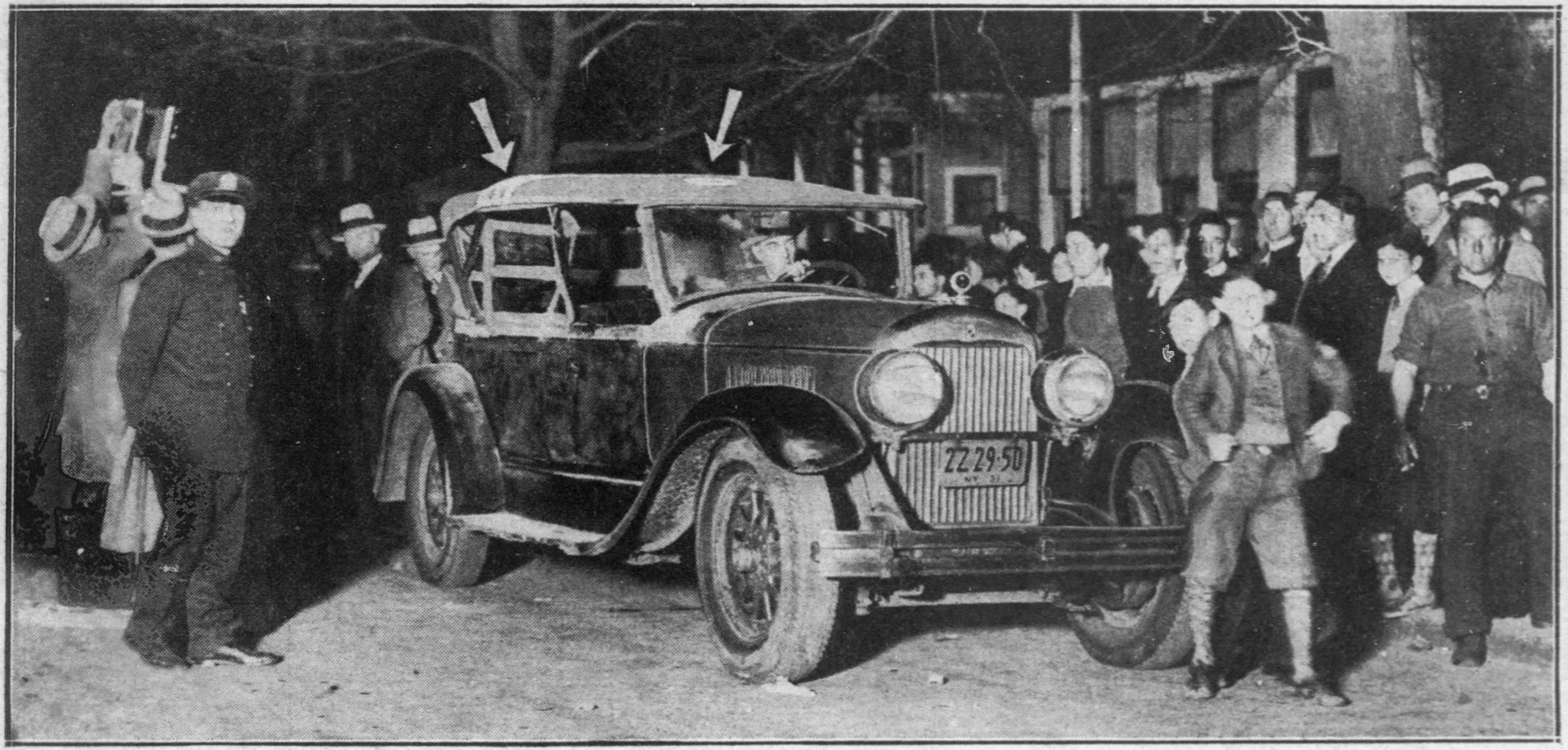
The car where booze racketeer Ernest (Hoppy) Rossi of Maranzano crime family was killed as a first reprisal for the death of Masseria, 17 April 1931, Brooklyn (Daily News)

With the death of Masseria, the feud ended. Maranzano organized the Mafia in New York City using a clear structure and hierarchy by dividing the main Italian gangs in New York into Five Families. Each family had a boss, underboss, consigliere, capos, soldiers and associates. Associates could come from any background. The higher ranks had to be "made men", required in most eras to be full-blooded Italian Americans. Shortly after Masseria's death, Maranzano announced that the Five Families would be led by Luciano, Joe Bonanno, Joseph Profaci, Vincent Mangano and Thomas Gagliano.

Except for New York City, the major urban areas in the Northeast and Midwest were organized into one family per city by Maranzano. Due to the size of organized crime in New York, it was organized into five separate families. The bosses of the Five Families of New York were to be Luciano (now the Genovese crime family), Profaci (now the Colombo crime family), Gagliano (now the Lucchese crime family), Maranzano (now the Bonanno crime family) and Frank Scalice (now the Gambino crime family). Maranzano called a meeting of crime bosses in Wappingers Falls, New York, where he declared himself capo di tutti capi ("boss of all bosses").

Each crime family was to be headed by a boss, who was assisted by an underboss. The third-ranking position of consigliere was added somewhat later. Below the underboss, the family was divided into crews, each headed by a caporegime, or capo, and staffed by soldiers. The soldiers would often be assisted by associates, who were not yet members. Associates could include non-Italians who worked with the family, and would include Meyer Lansky and Benjamin "Bugsy" Siegel.

== Death of Maranzano ==
Maranzano's reign as capo di tutti capi was short-lived. Although Maranzano was slightly more forward-thinking than Masseria, Luciano had come to believe that Maranzano was even greedier and more hidebound than Masseria had been. On September 10, 1931, Maranzano was shot and stabbed to death in his Manhattan office by a team of Jewish triggermen, recruited by Lansky, which included Samuel "Red" Levine, Bo Weinberg and Bugsy Siegel.

With both Maranzano and Masseria out of the way, it was easier for the Young Turks, led by Luciano, to assume control of the way things functioned in New York City. The first agenda on the table was the reformation and restructuring of the American Mafia. Luciano envisioned the future of the American Mafia in the form of a major corporation. He believed that this would increase cooperation, reduce conflict and ensure plain sailing governance by the Mafia as a whole.

Since Maranzano had formed a basic structure that was in the process of being put into effect, Luciano decided to retain the concept to a large extent. Owing to his clear disregard for orthodox ideologies that did not have any profitable consequences, Luciano allowed for more flexibility in the structure, allowing for the inclusion of other societal groups like the Jews to involve themselves with the families.

In Joe Bonanno's autobiography A Man of Honor, he states: "We revised the old custom of looking toward one man, one supreme leader for advice and the settling of disputes. We replaced leadership by one man with leadership by committee. We opted for a parliamentary arrangement whereby a group of the most important men in our world would assume the function formerly performed by one man."

In the aftermath of the Maranzano hit, there was believed to have been a massive purge of "old-timer" mafiosi, the so-called "Night of the Sicilian Vespers". These rumors were seemingly confirmed by the testimony of Joseph Valachi, but a later study found no signs of such massive violence occurring. Luciano formed "The Commission" to oversee all Mafia activities in the United States and serve to mediate conflicts between families, eliminating the capo di tutti capi position.

In the end, both of the traditional factions in the New York Mafia lost the feud. The real winners were the younger and more ruthless generation of mobsters, headed by Luciano. With their ascension to power, organized crime was poised to expand into a truly national and multi-ethnic combination.

== Popular culture ==
- The 1981 movie Gangster Wars and the 1991 Mobsters are partly fictionalized accounts of the Castellammarese War. 1981's The Gangster Chronicles TV miniseries covers the feud over a few of its thirteen episodes. All of these cover events from the point of view of Luciano.
- Events from the feud, most notably the assassination of Maranzano, are fictionalized in Mario Puzo's novel The Godfather.
- The 1973 Charles Bronson movie The Stone Killer is a fictionalized story of a complicated plot to assassinate the heads of organized crime families using Vietnam veterans. The plot is the brainchild of an elderly mafioso who has been obsessed since 1931 with avenging the "Night of the Sicilian Vespers" murders, supposedly orchestrated by Lucky Luciano.
- The feud is one of the main plot elements of the final season of Boardwalk Empire.
- In 2015, AMC's The Making of the Mob: New York covered the feud.

== See also ==
- Sicilian Mafia
- Second Mafia War

== Sources ==
- Critchley, David (2008). The Origin of Organized Crime in America: The New York City Mafia, 1891-1931. New York: Routledge. ISBN 978-0415990301.
- Dash, Mike (2010). The First Family: Terror, Extortion, Revenge, Murder and The Birth of the American Mafia. New York: Ballantine Books. ISBN 978-0345523570.
- Hortis, C. Alexander (2014). The Mob and the City: The Hidden History of How the Mafia Captured New York. Amherst, New York: Prometheus. ISBN 9781616149246.
- Sifakis, Carl (2005). The Mafia Encyclopedia. New York: Checkmark Books. ISBN 978-0816056958.
- Raab, Selwyn (2005). Five Families: The Rise, Decline, and Resurgence of America's Most Powerful Mafia Empires. St. Martin's Griffin. ISBN 9780312300944.
