= Capo dei capi =

Phrase used to indicate an extremely powerful Mafia boss

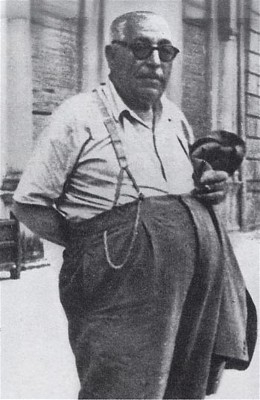
Calogero Vizzini, Mafia boss of Villalba

Capo dei capi (Italian: [ˈkaːpo dei ˈkaːpi]; "boss of [the] bosses"), capo di tutti i capi (Italian: [ˈkaːpo di ˈtutti i ˈkaːpi]; "boss of all bosses") or Godfather (Italian: padrino) are terms used mainly by the media, the public, fiction writers and the law enforcement community to indicate a supremely powerful crime boss in the Sicilian or American Mafia who holds great influence over the whole organization. The term was introduced to the U.S. public by the Kefauver Commission in 1950.

== Sicilian Mafia ==
In the Sicilian Mafia, the position does not exist. For instance, the old-style Mafia boss Calogero Vizzini was often portrayed in the media as the "boss of bosses" – although such a position does not exist according to later Mafia pentiti, such as Tommaso Buscetta. They also denied Vizzini ever was the ruling boss of the Mafia in Sicily. According to Mafia historian Salvatore Lupo "the emphasis of the media on the definition of 'capo dei capi' is without any foundation".

Nevertheless, the title has frequently been given to powerful Mafia bosses to this day. During the 1980s and 1990s the bosses of the Corleonesi, Salvatore Riina and Bernardo Provenzano, were bestowed with the title by the media.

In April 2006, the Italian government arrested Bernardo Provenzano in a small farmhouse near the town of Corleone. His successor is reported to be either Matteo Messina Denaro or Salvatore Lo Piccolo. This presupposes that Provenzano has the power to nominate a successor, which is not unanimously accepted among Mafia observers. "The Mafia today is more of a federation and less of an authoritarian state", according to anti-Mafia prosecutor Antonio Ingroia of the Direzione distrettuale antimafia of Palermo, referring to the previous period of authoritarian rule under Salvatore Riina.

Provenzano "established a kind of directorate of about four to seven people who met very infrequently, only when necessary, when there were strategic decisions to make". According to Ingroia "in an organization like the Mafia, a boss has to be one step above the others otherwise it all falls apart. It all depends on if he can manage consensus and if the others agree or rebel." Provenzano "guaranteed a measure of stability because he had the authority to quash internal disputes".

With the deaths of Bernardo Provenzano in 2016 and Salvatore Riina in 2017, Matteo Messina Denaro was seen as the capo dei capi of the Mafia. Combining this status of "boss of all bosses" with his three decades on the run, Messina Denaro became a character of great curiosity in the media. However, he was captured in early 2023 and ended up dying behind bars that same year.

After Messina Denaro's death, no other Mafia boss was known as the "capo dei capi".

In Italy, a fictional six-part television miniseries called Il Capo dei Capi relates the story of Salvatore Riina.

== American Mafia ==
=== Early claimants ===
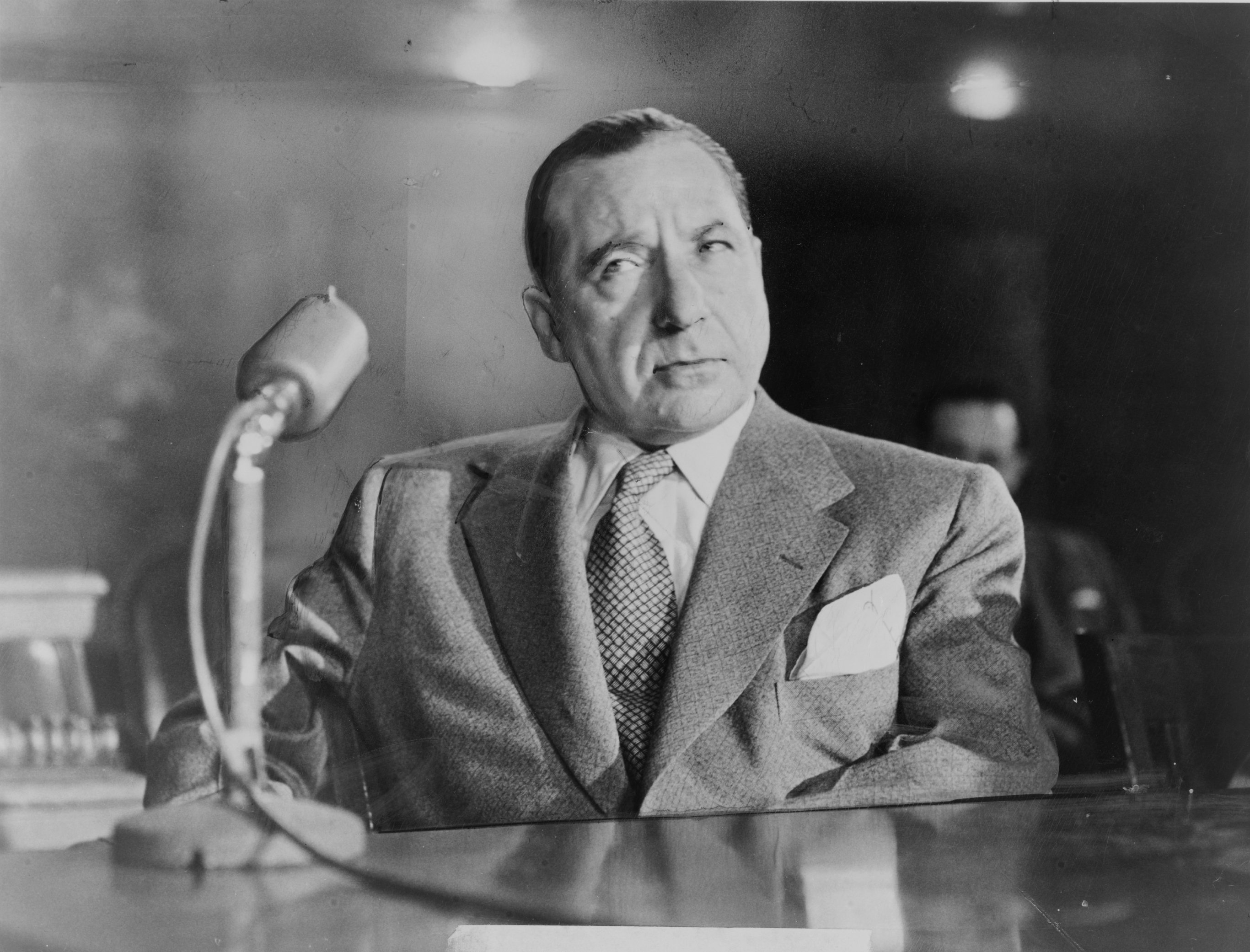
Frank Costello testifying before the Kefauver Committee

The title was applied by mobsters to Giuseppe Morello around 1900, according to Nick Gentile. Bosses Joe Masseria (1928–1931) and Salvatore Maranzano (1931) used the title as part of their efforts to centralize control of the Mafia under themselves. When Maranzano won the Castellammarese War, he set himself up as boss of all bosses, created the Five Families and ordered every Mafia family to pay him tribute. This provoked a rebellious reaction which led to him being murdered in September 1931, on the orders of Lucky Luciano.

=== Luciano era and the Commission ===
Although there would have been few objections had Luciano declared himself capo di tutti i capi, he abolished the title, believing the position created trouble between the families and would have made him a target for another ambitious challenger. Instead, Luciano established the Commission to lead the Mafia, with a goal of quietly maintaining his own power over all the families, while preventing future gang wars; the bosses approved the idea of the Commission. The Commission would consist of a "board of directors" to oversee all Mafia activities in the United States and serve to mediate conflicts between families. The Commission consisted of the bosses of the Five Families in New York City, the Buffalo crime family and the Chicago Outfit. Since then, while media sources have often sought to award the title of "boss of all bosses" to the most powerful boss, the Mafia has not itself recognized the position to exist.

=== Later figures ===
Among other bosses media sources have presumed to hold the title include Luciano himself, Frank Costello and Vito Genovese. Some have claimed the title of the head of the Gambino crime family, as purportedly the most powerful of the Five Families, which have included Carlo Gambino and his successors Paul Castellano and John Gotti.

The term has since fallen out of use in the media but remains popular in fictional accounts. Bonanno family boss Joseph Massino was recognized by four of the five families as chairman of the Commission from 2000 to 2004; during this time he was the only full-fledged boss in New York not in prison.

== 'Ndrangheta ==
In the 'Ndrangheta, a Mafia-type organisation in Calabria, the capocrimine is the elected boss of the crimine, an annual meeting of the 'Ndrangheta locali near the Sanctuary of Our Lady of Polsi in the municipality of San Luca during the September Feast. Far from being the "boss of bosses", the capo crimine actually has comparatively little authority to interfere in family feuds or to control the level of interfamily violence.

== Outside Italian organized crime ==
Several Mexican drug lords were named "El Jefe de Jefes", which can be translated into "boss of [the] bosses". Amongst them are Miguel Ángel Félix Gallardo and Arturo Beltrán Leyva.

== See also ==
- "Il capo dei capi" film series about Toto' Riina ("Corleone" English version with subtitles).
- The Godfather, film series about the powerful Corleone crime family
