= Joe Masseria =

Sicilian Mafia boss (1886–1931)

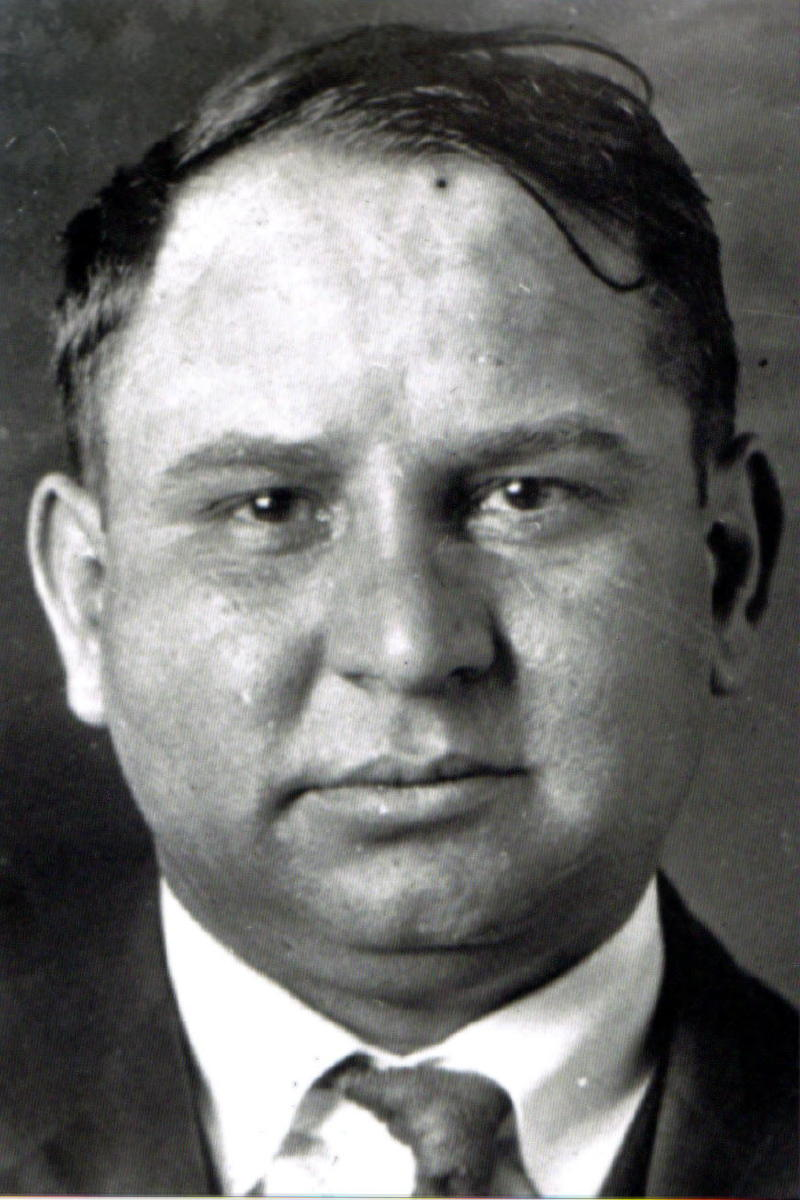
- Masseria's 1922 mugshot
- Born: Giuseppe Masseria; January 17, 1886; Menfi, Sicily, Kingdom of Italy
- Died: April 15, 1931 (aged 45); New York City, U.S.
- Cause of death: Murder by gunshots
- Resting place: Calvary Cemetery, Queens, New York, U.S.
- Other name: "Joe the Boss"
- Occupations: Crime boss, mobster
- Predecessor: Vincenzo Terranova
- Successor: Charles Luciano
- Allegiance: Masseria crime family
- Conviction: Burglary (1909)
- Penalty: Four to six years imprisonment (1913)

Giuseppe "Joe the Boss" Masseria (Italian: [dʒuˈzɛppe masseˈriːa]; January 17, 1886 – April 15, 1931) was an Italian-American Mafia boss in New York City. He was boss of what is now called the Genovese crime family, one of the New York City Mafia's Five Families, from 1922 to 1931. In 1930, he battled in the Castellammarese War to take over the criminal activities in New York City. The war ended with his murder on April 15, 1931, in a hit ordered by his own lieutenant, Charles "Lucky" Luciano, in an agreement with rival faction head Salvatore Maranzano.

== Early life ==
Giuseppe Masseria was born on January 17, 1886, in Menfi, Province of Agrigento, Sicily, in a family of tailors. When he was young, he moved to the town of Marsala, in the Province of Trapani. Masseria arrived in the United States in 1902. He then became part of the Morello crime family based in Harlem and parts of Little Italy in southern Manhattan. Masseria was a contemporary of other captains of that mafia family such as Gaetano Reina. In 1909, Masseria was convicted of burglary and received a suspended sentence. On May 23, 1913, Masseria was sentenced to four to six years in prison for third-degree burglary.

As the 1910s ended, Masseria and boss Salvatore D'Aquila vied for power in New York. By the early 1920s, they were at war with each other. In 1920, Masseria had recruited Lucky Luciano as one of his gunmen. D'Aquila also had a gunman working for him, Umberto Valenti, and ordered him to kill Masseria. On May 8, 1922, the boss of the Morello/Terranova crime family, Vincenzo Terranova, was killed in a drive-by shooting near his E. 116th Street home. Valenti was believed to have been personally responsible. Hours later, Terranova's underboss Silva Tagliagamba was fatally wounded in Lower Manhattan by Valenti and gunmen working for him. That night, Valenti and some of his men attacked the new boss of the rival Terranova family, Masseria. Valenti found Masseria and his bodyguards on Grand Street "within a block of Police Headquarters". Masseria got away, but the gunmen had shot four men and two women; Masseria tossed his pistol away and was arrested while fleeing the scene.

On August 9, 1922, Masseria walked out of his apartment at 80 2nd Avenue, and was rushed by two armed men who opened fire on him. Masseria ducked into a store at 82 2nd Avenue with the gunmen in pursuit. They shot out the front window and shot up the inside of the store. The gunmen fled across 2nd Avenue to a getaway car idling just around the corner on E. 5th Street. The gunmen jumped on the running boards as the car sped west on E. 5th Street towards the Bowery, guns blazing. The gunmen then plowed through a crowd and shot randomly at the blockade, wounding six men. Masseria survived the incident and was found by police in his upstairs bedroom shell-shocked. He was sitting on his bed dazed, with two bullet holes through his straw hat, which he was still wearing. The incident gained Masseria new respect among gangsters as "the man who can dodge bullets" and his reputation began to rise as D'Aquila's began to wane.

Forty-eight hours later, on August 11, Valenti attended a meeting in a cafe at the corner of Second Avenue and E. 12th Street, where he was murdered as he tried to flee. The Herald stated, "Valenti, said to be strong in his hatred of Masseria, was killed coldly and with as little compunction as one would swat a fly." Gangland lore had long held that his killer was none other than Charles "Lucky" Luciano. Just after this incident, Giuseppe Masseria began being referred to as "Joe the Boss".

== Castellammarese War ==
Masseria became head of the Morello family and was known as "Joe the Boss", with Giuseppe Morello as his consigliere.

Salvatore D'Aquila was killed on October 10, 1928. Masseria, the leader of a gang that emerged from the old Morello crime family, was selected to replace D'Aquila as the new capo dei capi that winter. After his elevation, Masseria began applying pressure to other mafia gangs for monetary tributes. Other mobsters accused him of orchestrating the 1930 murders of Gaspar Milazzo in Detroit and Gaetano Reina in the Bronx. Nicolo Schiro tried to replicate the strategy of neutrality he used to deal with D'Aquila with Masseria but he was vigorously opposed by Salvatore Maranzano and Buffalo boss Stefano Magaddino. Masseria claimed Schiro had committed a transgression and demanded Schiro pay him $10,000 and step down as leader of his mafia crime family. Schiro complied. Soon after, Vito Bonventre was murdered at his home on July 15, 1930. This led to Maranzano being elevated to boss of the gang and a conflict with Masseria and his allies referred to as the Castellammarese War.

During the Castellammarese War, between 1930 and 1931, Masseria and Morello fought against a rival group, based in Brooklyn, led by Salvatore Maranzano and Joseph Bonanno. Morello, an old hand in the killing game, became Masseria's "war chief" and strategic adviser.

One of the first victims of the war, Morello was killed along with associate Joseph Perriano on August 15, 1930, while collecting cash receipts in his East Harlem office. Joseph Valachi, the first made man in the American Mafia to turn state's evidence, identified Morello's killer as a Castellammarese gunman he knew as "Buster from Chicago".

== Death ==
In a secret deal with Maranzano, Lucky Luciano agreed to engineer the death of his boss, Masseria, in return for receiving Masseria's rackets and becoming Maranzano's second-in-command. Joe Adonis had joined the Masseria faction and when Masseria heard about Luciano's betrayal, he approached Adonis about killing Luciano. However, Adonis instead warned Luciano about the murder plot. On April 15, 1931, Luciano lured Masseria to a meeting where he was murdered at a restaurant called Nuova Villa Tammaro on Coney Island. While they played cards, Luciano allegedly excused himself to the bathroom, with the gunmen reportedly being Albert Anastasia, Vito Genovese, Joe Adonis, and Benjamin "Bugsy" Siegel; Ciro "The Artichoke King" Terranova drove the getaway car, but legend has it that he was too shaken up to drive away and had to be shoved out of the driver's seat by Siegel.

Luciano was brought in for questioning by the police. At the time, police suspected a gangster named John "Silk Stockings" Giustra as being one of the gunmen in Masseria's murder. This was based on the report of a confidential informant and that one of the coats found at the murder scene was identified as belonging to Giustra. The case was dropped after Giustra was murdered on July 9, 1931.

According to The New York Times, "[A]fter that, the police have been unable to learn definitely [what happened]". Reputedly Masseria was "seated at a table playing cards with two or three unknown men" when he was fired upon from behind. He died from gunshot wounds to his head, back, and chest. Masseria's autopsy report shows that he died on an empty stomach. No witnesses came forward, though "two or three" men were observed leaving the restaurant and getting into a stolen car. No one was convicted in Masseria's murder as there were no witnesses and Luciano had an alibi.

Masseria is buried at Calvary Cemetery in Queens, New York.

== In popular culture ==
=== Films ===
- The Valachi Papers (1972) – portrayed by Alessandro Sperlì
- Mobsters (1991) – portrayed by Anthony Quinn. Quinn was much older, when he played Masseria, than Masseria was when Masseria died. Quinn was 75 already and Masseria was only 45 when he died.
- Lansky (1999) – portrayed by Bill Capizzi
- Bonanno: A Godfather’s Story (1999) – portrayed by Tony Calabretta

=== TV series ===
- Boardwalk Empire (2010–2014) – portrayed by Ivo Nandi. His assassination is depicted as being carried out by Bugsy Siegel and Tonino Sandrelli.
- The Making of the Mob: New York (2015) – In this docu-drama he is portrayed by Stelio Savante
- The Gangster Chronicles (1981) – in the NBC American crime drama miniseries, he is portrayed by Richard S. Castellano

== See also ==
- Black Hand (extortion)
- Crime in New York City

American Mafia
Preceded by Uncertain	Genovese crime family Boss c.1922–1931	Succeeded by Lucky Luciano
Preceded by Salvatore D'Aquila	Capo dei capi Boss of bosses 1928–1930	Succeeded by Gaspare Messina
