= Salvatore Maranzano =

Italian-American mob boss (1886–1931)

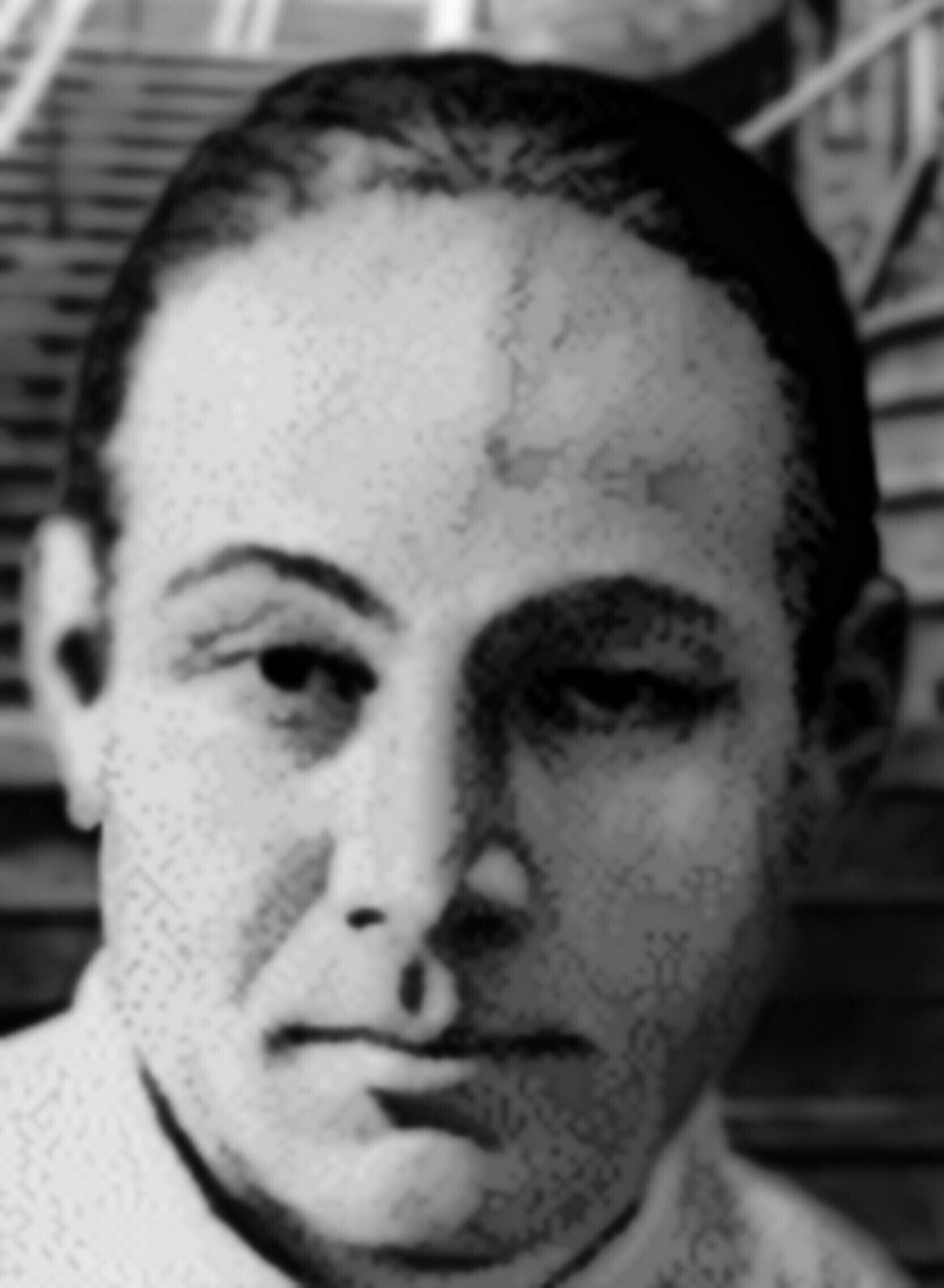
- Facial recreation
- Born: July 31, 1886; Castellammare del Golfo, Sicily, Kingdom of Italy
- Died: September 10, 1931 (aged 45); New York City, U.S.
- Cause of death: Stab wounds and gunshots
- Resting place: Saint John Cemetery, Queens, New York City, U.S.
- Other names: Little Caesar; The Boss of All Bosses
- Occupation: Crime boss
- Predecessor: Nicolo Schiro
- Successor: Joseph Bonanno
- Allegiance: Maranzano crime family

Salvatore Maranzano (Italian: [salvaˈtoːre maranˈtsaːno]; July 31, 1886 – September 10, 1931), nicknamed Little Caesar, was an Italian-American mobster from the town of Castellammare del Golfo, Sicily, and an early Cosa Nostra boss who led what later would become the Bonanno crime family in New York City. He instigated the Castellammarese War in 1930 to seize control of the American Mafia, winning the war after the murder of rival faction head Joe Masseria in April 1931. He then briefly became the Mafia's capo di tutti capi ("boss of all bosses") and formed the Five Families in New York City but was murdered on September 10, 1931, on the orders of Charles "Lucky" Luciano, who established the Commission, in which families shared power to prevent future turf wars.

== Life and career ==
=== Early years ===
Salvatore Maranzano was the youngest of 12 children born to Domenico Maranzano and Antonina Pisciotta. Five of his siblings lived to adulthood: Mariano, Angelo, Nicolo, Giuseppe, and Angela. As a youngster, Maranzano had wanted to become a priest and even studied to become one, but later became associated with the Mafia in his homeland. Maranzano had a very commanding presence and was greatly respected by his underworld peers. He had a fascination with Julius Caesar and the Roman Empire, and enjoyed talking to his less-educated American Mafia counterparts about these subjects. Because of this, he was nicknamed "Little Caesar" by his underworld peers.

Maranzano was married to Elisabetta Minore, sister of Salvatore Minore, an influential mafioso in the city of Trapani and related to the Minore family, which had strong connections to the local Mafia.

Maranzano emigrated from Sicily to the United States in the 1920s, settling in Brooklyn. It is commonly said that he arrived in the United States in 1925. The Sicilian mafioso Don Vito Ferro decided to make a bid for control of Mafia operations in the United States. From his base in Castellammare del Golfo, Maranzano was sent to seize control. While building a legitimate business as a real estate broker, Maranzano also maintained a growing bootlegging business, using the real estate company as a front for his illegal operations. He soon became involved in prostitution and the illegal smuggling of narcotics; he also took a liking to young Joseph Bonanno and became his mentor.

=== Castellammarese War ===
To protect the criminal empire that Maranzano had built up, he declared war on his rival Joe Masseria, the boss of all bosses, in 1930, starting the Castellammarese War. In early 1931, Lucky Luciano decided to eliminate his boss, Masseria. In a secret deal with Maranzano, Luciano agreed to engineer Masseria's death in return for receiving Masseria's rackets and becoming Maranzano's second-in-command. On April 15, Luciano invited Masseria and two other associates to lunch in a Coney Island restaurant. After finishing their meal, the mobsters decided to play cards. At that point, according to mob legend, Luciano went to the bathroom. Four gunmen – Vito Genovese, Albert Anastasia, Joe Adonis and Benjamin "Bugsy" Siegel – then walked into the dining room and shot and killed Masseria. With Maranzano's blessing, Luciano took over Masseria's gang and became Maranzano's lieutenant.

=== Boss of all bosses ===
With Masseria gone, Maranzano reorganized the Italian American gangs in New York City into the Five Families, headed by Luciano, Joe Profaci, Tommy Gagliano, Vincent Mangano, and himself. Each family would have a boss, underboss, capos, soldiers, and associates. The families ("made men") would be composed of only full-blooded Italian American members, while associates could come from any background. However, Maranzano called a meeting of crime bosses in Wappingers Falls, New York, and declared himself capo dei capi ("boss of all bosses"). Maranzano also whittled down the rival families' rackets in favor of his own. Luciano appeared to accept these changes, but was merely biding his time before removing Maranzano. Although Maranzano was slightly more forward-thinking than Masseria, Luciano had come to believe that Maranzano was even greedier and more hidebound than Masseria had been.

Maranzano's scheming, his arrogant treatment of his subordinates and his fondness for comparing his organization to the Roman Empire (he attempted to model the organization after Caesar's military chain of command) did not sit well with Luciano and his ambitious friends, such as Vito Genovese, Frank Costello and others. Despite his advocacy for modern methods of organization, including crews of soldiers doing the bulk of a family's illegal work under the supervision of a caporegime, at heart Maranzano was a "Mustache Pete" — an old-school mafioso too steeped in Old World ways. He was opposed to Luciano's partnership with Jewish gangsters such as Meyer Lansky and Benjamin "Bugsy" Siegel. Luciano and his colleagues had intended all along to bide their time before getting rid of Maranzano.

=== Death ===
By September 1931, Maranzano realized Luciano was a threat, and hired Mad Dog Coll, an Irish gangster, to kill him. However, Tommy Lucchese alerted Luciano that he was marked for death. On September 10, Maranzano ordered Luciano and Genovese to come to his office at the New York Central Building (now the Helmsley Building), at 230 Park Avenue in Manhattan. Convinced that Maranzano planned to murder them, Luciano decided to act first. He sent to Maranzano's office four Jewish gangsters whose faces were unknown to Maranzano's people. They had been secured with the aid of Lansky, Siegel and Gambino. Disguised as government agents, two of the gangsters disarmed Maranzano's bodyguards. The other two, aided by Lucchese, who was there to point Maranzano out, stabbed the boss multiple times before shooting him. This assassination was the first of what would later be called the "Night of the Sicilian Vespers". Although there would have been few objections had Luciano declared himself capo dei capi, he abolished the title, believing the position created trouble among the families and would make himself a target for another ambitious challenger. Luciano subsequently created The Commission to serve as the governing body for organized crime. Maranzano is buried in Saint John Cemetery, Queens, New York, near Luciano's grave.

== In popular culture ==
- Maranzano plays a small fictionalized role in Mario Puzo's The Godfather. Don Vito Corleone refused Maranzano’s proposal to share his monopoly on gambling in New York City, in exchange for police and political contacts and expansion into Brooklyn and the Bronx. Maranzano arranged for two of Al Capone's gunmen to come to New York and finish Corleone. Through his contacts in Chicago, Corleone found out, and sent Luca Brasi to murder the gunmen. With Capone out of the picture, the great mob war of 1933 began in earnest. Desperate for peace, Maranzano agreed to a sit down in a restaurant in Brooklyn, where he was killed by Salvatore Tessio, a capo in the Corleone family. Afterwards, Corleone took over Maranzano's organization and held a meeting to reorganize the American Mafia, something that the real-life Maranzano did.
- In the 1972 film The Valachi Papers, Maranzano is portrayed by Joseph Wiseman.
- In the 1981 NBC mini-series The Gangster Chronicles, Maranzano is portrayed by Joseph Mascolo.
- In the 1990 film Mobsters, Maranzano is portrayed by Michael Gambon, but is known as "Faranzano". His death is also different in this movie, as "Faranzano" was thrown out of a building's window in the film instead.
- In the 1999 film Lansky, Maranzano is portrayed by Ron Gilbert.
- In the 1999 Lifetime film Bonanno: A Godfather's Story, Maranzano is portrayed by Edward James Olmos.
- In the 2011 Torchwood episode "Immortal Sins", Maranzano is portrayed by Cris D'Annunzio.
- In the fifth season of Boardwalk Empire, Maranzano is portrayed by Giampiero Judica. In the show, his assassination is depicted as being ordered by Nucky Thompson, and Nucky's brother Eli is one of the participating gunmen, finishing Maranzano off by shooting him in the head.
- In the 2021 film Lansky, Maranzano is portrayed by Jay Giannone. He is depicted as having been stabbed in his office by Bugsy Siegel while Meyer Lansky watches, as opposed to his real death where he was stabbed and shot by four unknown Jewish gunmen.

== See also ==
- Black Hand (extortion)

American Mafia
Preceded by Nicolo Schiro	Bonanno crime family Boss; 1930–1931	Succeeded by Joseph Bonanno
Preceded by Gaspare Messina	Capo dei capi Boss of bosses 1931	Succeeded by Lucky Luciano as chairman of the Commission
