= George W. McClusky =

American police inspector

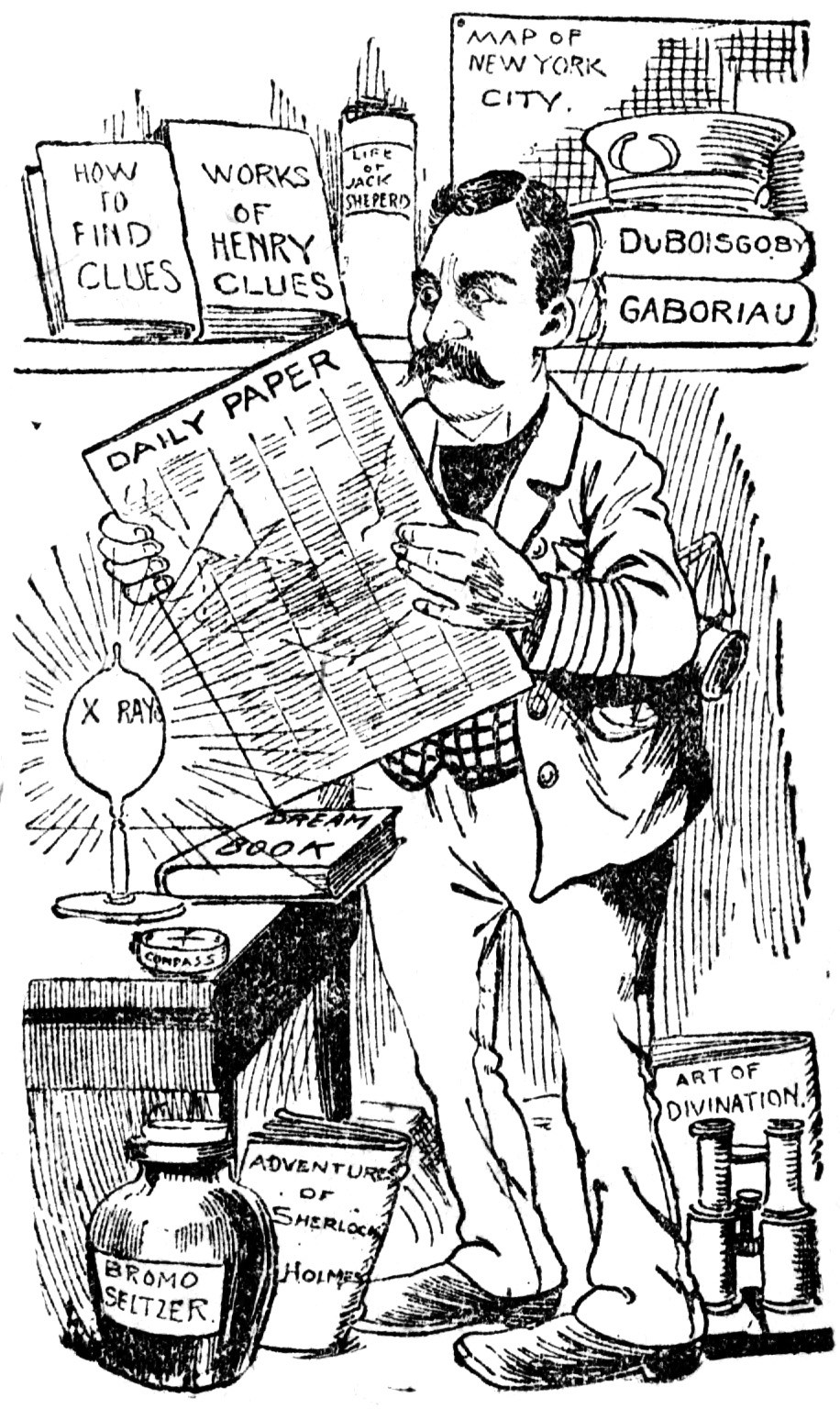
- 1899 cartoon of George McClusky in the New York Journal
- Born: 1861; New York City, United States
- Died: December 17, 1912 (aged 51); Manhattan, New York, US
- Resting place: Calvary Cemetery
- Other names: Chesty George; Gentleman George
- Occupation: Police officer
- Employer: New York City Police Department
- Known for: Headed NYPD Detective Bureau from 1897–1900 and 1902–1905; credited for the arrests of confidence man John McDermott and murderer Roland B. Molineux

George W. McClusky or McCluskey (1861 – December 17, 1912) was an American law enforcement officer and police inspector in the New York City Police Department. He was popularly known as "Gentleman" or "Chesty McCluskey", the latter name given to him by NYPD Police Chief William "Big Bill" Devery, and was the longtime head of the NYPD Detective's Bureau at the turn of the 20th century. He was also, at one time, the youngest inspector on the police force.

== Biography ==
=== Early life and police career ===
Born in New York City, George McClusky joined the New York City Police Department as a patrolman in 1882. He rose more slowly in rank than many of his peers, becoming a roundsman in 1895, then sergeant and police captain within the next two years. When Theodore Roosevelt was appointed head of the Board of Police Commissioners, McClusky was reassigned as a patrolman. His rank would rise and fall more than any other officer in his 30 years on the police force. Indeed, he soon regained his former rank under Mayor William Strong and was considered one of the rising stars in the NYPD during the 1890s.

McClusky was considered an ideal undercover detective as his clothes and "aristocratic" manner provided him with an excellent cover. He was credited for a number of high-profile arrests during his early career as a police detective. Among these was the capture of the confidence man John McDermott whom he pursued through Europe until finally tracking him down at New York's popular Delmonico's on May 28, 1890. McDermott was dining with Sir Robert Peel and Viscount Clifford Talbot, having befriended them on his return voyage to the United States, when McClusky confronted the trickster. An altercation then occurred, the English noblemen angered at McClusky's accusations towards their friend, however McClusky was able to convince the men of McDermott's intentions and prevented them from becoming another of his victims. A protégé of Police Inspector Thomas F. Byrnes, McClusky accompanied Byrnes when he investigated the attempted murder of financier Russell Sage in 1891.

=== "Chesty" George and the NYPD Detective's Bureau ===
In 1897, McClusky was made chief of the NYPD Detective's Bureau. Through evidence largely collected by himself, he was able to arrest murderer Roland B. Molineux. He remained in the bureau for three years before his demotion by Police Chief William "Big Bill" Devery in 1900. Devery was alleged to have been part of a gambling syndicate consisting of himself, Frank Farrell and Timothy "Big Tim" Sullivan which, at the time of McClusky's removal, generated around $3 million from payoffs to corrupt politicians and police officials according to the New York Times.

Following this, Devery was quoted as saying "I'll put a man in charge of the Detective's Bureau that people can talk to. McClusky is too chesty to be of any use. "Chesty" George, that's what he is". This was in reference both to his "manly" appearance as well as his familiar "dandy"-style of dress and the nickname would remain with him throughout his career. One summer evening, he visited the Hotel Knickerbocker wearing "a straw hat of a colored check pattern with a six-inch brim". A hat designer who was also in the hotel took a sketch of the hat and had his firm manufacturing them. A few days later, McClusky allegedly saw his hat in a Broadway store under a sign which read "Step in and buy a Merry Widow. The kind wore by Inspector McClusky, the swellest cop in the world".

Two years later, McClusky became a police inspector and assigned to the Fifth District by Commissioner Francis V. Greene. At 42 years old, he was the youngest man in the NYPD to hold the position. Greene also returned him to the detective's bureau where he soon went after the Morello crime family, an early Sicilian mafiosi organization, whose investigation would come into conflict with U.S. Secret Service chief William Flynn then investigating the "Barrel murders". McClusky immediately went on the offensive ordering the arrest of a dozen known members of the Morellos. The arrests were met by fierce and violent fighting which in some cases, again according to the New York Times, ended only when suspects heads were "slammed into the pavement to overcome resistance". Among those arrested were Giuseppe Morello, Lupo the Wolf, Vito Cascio Ferro, and 24-year-old Tomasso "The Ox" Petto. Petto, the Times claimed, had "fought like a wild beast" until a police officer knocked him out in "a stunning blow" with a blackjack.

He later marched the Morellos through the streets of Little Italy, a move that has been described as an early version of the perp walk that later become a common practice of law enforcement in New York and the country as a whole. Although McClusky claimed that the three paddy wagons which had been scheduled to transport them to the courthouse had not shown, it has been speculated that he really wanted to humiliate the Morellos by parading them "before their countrymen as the Romans had paraded their captives". Italian police were also known to use this tactic.

The mafiosi, however, received a sympathetic response from the large crowd which had gathered. A movement in the crowd caused detectives to believe a rescue attempt was being made to free the prisoners and police "broke up the crowd ... knocking down some men and boys". Flynn criticized McClusky's recklessness, noting the mobsters now had time to "get their stories straight", however the NYPD had brought significant attention to organized crime in New York. Vito Cascio Ferro fled from the city, living in New Orleans for a time, before returning to Sicily where he resided as a powerful figure in the Mafia for several decades.

On May 20, 1904 McCluskey came upon a vaudeville performer named Lew Dockstader who, on the streets of New York, was making a Kinetoscope film with the Edison Kinetscope Company. The short film was about president and former Police Commissioner Theodore Roosevelt. McCluskey detained Dockstader and seized the film, costumes, and "other accessories." The "series of pictures" attempted to caricature you and the office you hold" said William McAdoo in a letter to Roosevelt. Dockstader agreed to turn the film over to the New York City Police Department to be forwarded to Washington, and then destroyed. With that agreement, Dockstader was released. What happened to the film is unknown. It was never displayed to the public.

McCluskey's return lasted only a short while and he was removed once more in 1905 when William McAdoo succeeded Greene as commissioner. His career did not improve under the Cropsey administration as he was demoted to captain and sent to Morrisania Station. His rank was eventually restored under Police Commissioner Rhinelander Waldo after Waldo's appointment in 1911.

McCluskey was present when the survivors of the Titanic were received by Mayor William J. Gaynor and Commissioner Waldo, the police inspector handling crowd control with 12 mounted police officers and a squad of plainclothes men who established an area covering a two-block radius which was closed to the general public barring passes from the federal government or the Cunard line.

=== Death ===
In late 1912, McClusky became mysteriously ill while in charge of the Fourteenth Inspection District. It was first believed he had become sick with ptomaine poisoning after eating shellfish at a recent shore dinner and took a leave of absence on September 18. His condition did not improve however and a physical examination found he was suffering from acute anemia. The following day, a more thorough examination by Dr. Charles E. Nammack found his blood contained only 27% of red corpuscles found in normal blood. McClusky's health grew continually worse over the next few months. Dr. Nammack later diagnosed his condition as a rare form of anemia. The doctor later explained further "Little is known of the rare form of anemia from which the Inspector suffered. It is called progressive pernicious anaemia, and of the 1,200 cases known to the medical profession, only six recoveries are reported". A blood transfusion, he claimed, would be been ineffective as McClusky's heart and other organs were undergoing a general breakdown. In the last weeks of his life, the red corpuscles in his blood fell to 9%.

He finally died at his West Seventeenth Street home on the night of December 17, 1912. His three sisters Mary, Margaret and Ida McClusky were with him at the time of his death. The latter two sisters were unmarried and still lived with McClusky. Mgr. Matthew A. Taylor of the Church of Blessed Sacrament was also in attendance to administer extreme unction. Funeral services were held by the church at his residence the following day.

Although his last wishes were to have a small and quiet ceremony with no oration, the large attendance and number of floral tributes made the service more elaborate than was intended. Among those present at the funeral included Chief Inspector Max F. Schmittberger, former Police Inspector Cornelius Hays, former Police Chief John H. McCullagh, former Congressman Edward J. Dunphy and former fire chief Edward Croker. At around 10:00 am, his body was removed from his home and carried to the hearse by seven pallbearers from Traffic Squad 3. These men were Patrolmen Brune, Matthews, Kennedy, Juna, Maloy, Shine and Young. A requiem mass was held at the Church of Blessed Sacrament before his body was buried at Calvary Cemetery.
