= Perp walk =

Parading an arrested criminal suspect before the media

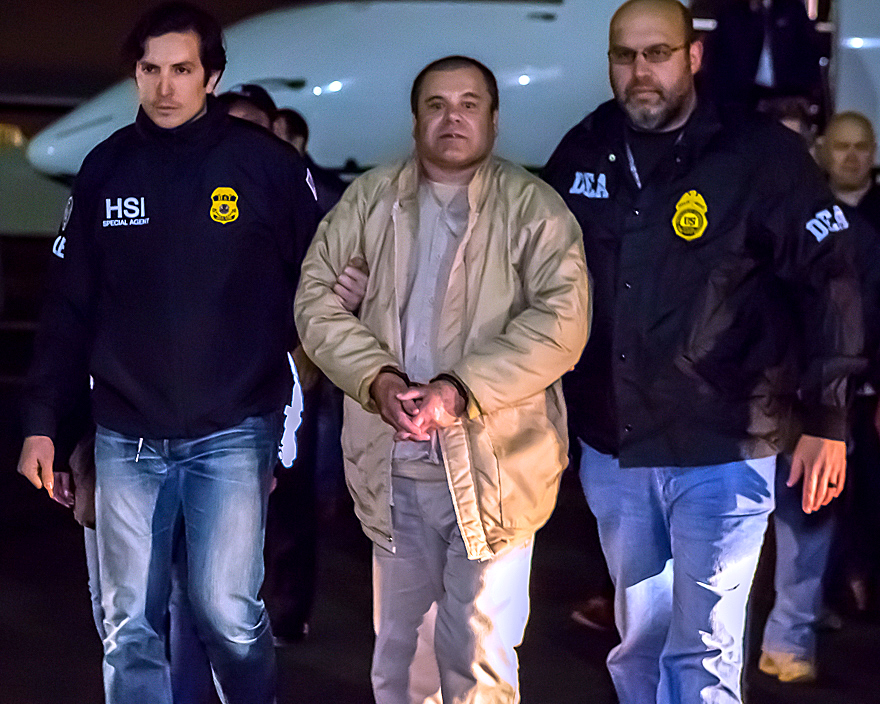
El Chapo's perp walk after his 2017 extradition to the U.S.

A perp walk or walking the perp (Note: The term perp is short for perpetrator, and is commonly used by police departments for those they arrest. It is legally inaccurate since the arrested individual's guilt has not been judicially established at that point.) (also called a frog march in Washington, D.C.) is a practice in law enforcement of parading an arrested suspect out in public before their initial appearance in court. The suspect is typically escorted from a police station to a police vehicle to the courthouse and then after the court hearing back to a vehicle, creating an opportunity for a media frenzy to take photographs and video of the event (sometimes, if the police have alerted the media to an imminent arrest, it takes place afterwards). The defendant is normally handcuffed or otherwise restrained, and is sometimes dressed in prison garb. Within the United States the perp walk is most closely associated with New York City. The practice rose in popularity in the 1980s under U.S. Attorney Rudolph Giuliani, when suspects charged with felonies were perp-walked.

The perp walk arose incidentally from the need to transport a defendant from a police station to court after arrest. Law enforcement agencies often coordinate with the media in scheduling and arranging them. It has been criticized as a form of public humiliation that violates a defendant's right to privacy and is prejudicial to the presumption of innocence, but is defended as promoting transparency in the criminal justice system. American courts have permitted it on the grounds that it arises from the limitations and necessity of police procedure, but have also limited it only to those times when it is actually necessary.

== Procedure ==
In the United States, once a person has been charged with a crime, the government may request that a judge either issue a summons for that person or an arrest warrant, which can lead to a perp walk. The choice of which to request is largely at the discretion of the prosecutor. Judges often defer to them.

Since the arrest power is meant to ensure the defendant's presence in court, lawyers defending the white-collar criminals who have been perp-walked since the late 1980s have complained it is unnecessary and superfluous in their clients' cases, even if it does give the appearance of preferential treatment for wealthy defendants. Lea Fastow, the wife of former Enron executive Andrew Fastow, cited the perp walk she was made to take even though she had expressed her willingness to surrender to a summons in an unsuccessful motion for a change of venue. Some, like Martha Stewart, have still managed to avoid being perp-walked by responding to summonses, or surrendering in the courtroom as soon as the indictment is presented in open court.

This did not prevent another Houston-area defendant, former Dynegy natural gas trader Michelle Valencia, from undergoing a perp walk in 2003. After waiting all day for the indictment, her attorney told prosecutors she would return there the next morning. Instead, she was arrested at her home before the courthouse opened. Her attorney said prosecutors were bullying her for refusing to cooperate with them. Similarly, lawyers for Adelphia Communications chairman John Rigas criticized prosecutors for having him arrested at his home on Manhattan's Upper East Side in 2002 despite his offer to surrender. Defense lawyers have been advised that if they are aware an indictment and arrest is imminent, to announce to the media that their client will surrender at a particular time in the near future, making a subsequent arrest and perp walk seem gratuitous.

=== Law enforcement ===
The ultimate discretion over whether a perp walk occurs belongs to the arresting law enforcement agency. Local departments may inform the media prior to an arrest even occurring, if they wish to have footage of that being broadcast. Federal agencies, on the other hand, are generally prohibited from informing the media of arrests in advance by Justice Department policy. However, they cannot prohibit photography or video of a defendant being transported through public places after the arrest has been publicized.

Once the decision is made to arrest the suspect, or they have voluntarily surrendered, they are photographed and fingerprinted at a police station, and then taken to the appropriate courthouse for an arraignment or similar procedure that brings the case into the legal system. The New York City Police Department (NYPD) usually advises the media (Note: In New York City, local media includes three daily newspapers and many weeklies, six broadcast television stations and one citywide cable channel, as well as various Internet outlets. Cases involving defendants arrested in New York often attract national and international interest, and those media are notified as well if they have expressed interest.) as to when this will happen in cases that may be of interest; other large departments do not, so photographers and camera crews wait at the central location in hopes of getting a perp-walk image. In 2011, some New York camera crews and photographers waited 15 hours for former International Monetary Fund director Dominique Strauss-Kahn to be brought by for his arraignment on charges of sexually assaulting a hotel maid.

Many police departments require that defendants facing felony charges wear at least handcuffs regardless of the nature of the crime they are accused of. The defendant taken to court is usually brought in through an entrance from a public area such as the street or sidewalk, often escorted by plainclothes police officers (who may be those who have investigated the case and made the arrest, especially if multiple agencies were involved) and sometimes accompanied by their attorney. Those areas are accessible to all, including the media. It is there that they may take still or moving images of the defendant, and often ask questions of them. In high-profile cases, with major media interest, such as a crime which has received considerable public attention or in which the defendant is a celebrity, measures such as barricades or extra uniformed officers will be present to ensure there is space to get the defendant and escorting officers into the building. "You naturally assume you're seeing a barbaric mob wreaking random havoc," writes New York Times columnist John Tierney of such scenes. "But that's not the case. It's actually a barbaric mob wreaking exquisitely planned havoc."

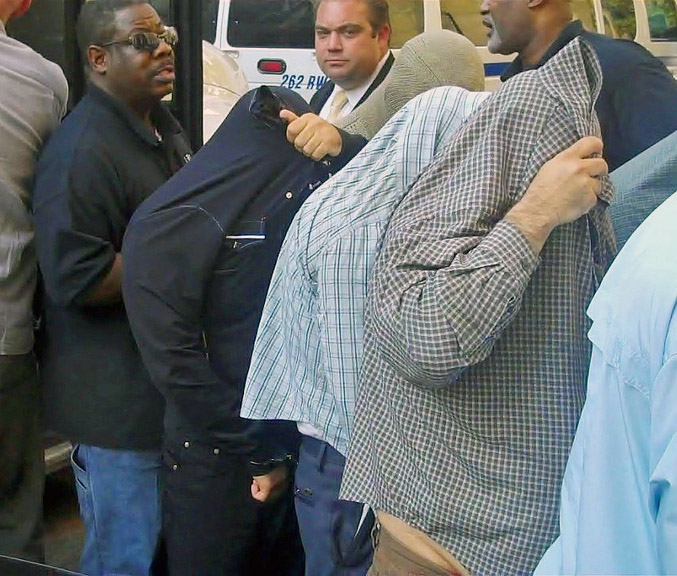
Defendants in the New York City Criminal Court using their shirts to hide their faces

=== Defendants ===
Most law enforcement agencies will allow suspects to temporarily hide their faces during their perp walks. They may simply (if they are cuffed in the front or not cuffed at all) use their hands to shield their faces from onlookers and the press. Some may wear sunglasses, and some may wear hooded shirts or jackets that they then wrap tightly around their faces. Suspects sometimes pull clothing over their heads or walk with their heads down to hide their faces. (Note: This is also sometimes a consequence of how they are handcuffed. The police have the discretion to cuff the defendant either in front or back, with hands back-to-back or not, and tightly or loosely based on how cooperative the defendant has been and the severity of the crime he or she has been charged with. When cuffed tightly, back-to-back in the rear, it is more comfortable to walk in a slightly bent position.) Suspects also often struggle to walk and hide their faces at the same time as they are often bombarded with the microphones and cameras of the press covering their arraignments or cases. The police also sometimes provide certain defendants, such as accused current or former police officers and criminals who have been useful to them as informants, with hoods and abbreviated perp walks from a side entrance. Conversely, in a high-profile case, the police may accommodate the media by extending the perp walk into a "perp parade" beyond the necessary distance, such as around the block, or delaying the court proceeding until the media can be present, as was the case at the 1999 arraignment of former Wu-tang Clan rapper Russell Jones on charges that were later dropped. Perp walks were restaged for the benefit of the media until a 2000 court ruling restricted them to those necessary for law enforcement purposes.

Defendants who can anticipate their arrest often dress with the perp walk in mind. Two former federal prosecutors turned defense attorneys advise that a white-collar defendant "should be prepared to look as professional as possible under the circumstances," as the fictional character Sherman McCoy does after he surrenders to face a charge stemming from a hit-and-run accident in Tom Wolfe's 1987 novel The Bonfire of the Vanities. New York publicist Mortimer Matz recommends an old raincoat. In addition to concealing the handcuffs, he says, it is not a problem when the garment inevitably gets smudged by fingerprint ink remaining on the defendant's hands. New York Mafia boss John Gotti wore the expensive custom-tailored suits that earned him his "Dapper Don" nickname during perp walks, in contrast to the sweatpants and jackets seen among other contemporary organized-crime figures.

Susan McDougal, subjected to a brief perp walk in a miniskirt, leg irons and a waist chain as she was taken to jail for refusing to testify before special prosecutor Kenneth Starr's grand jury investigating Whitewater, wrote of the experience in her memoir, The Woman Who Wouldn't Talk:

As soon as I saw the camera lights, I instantly knew that everyone I loved would see this on the evening news. I'd assumed the marshals would transport me to jail in secrecy. Now the entire world would get to see that Ken Starr had beaten me. My natural reaction was to duck my head and hide from the cameras, like I'd seen so many people do on television. But another thought hit me—no way would I give them that satisfaction. Mustering as much dignity as I could—which, given my metal accessories, was not much—I threw my head back, jutted my chin out, and walked along like I didn't have a care in the world.

In The Bonfire of the Vanities lawyer Tommy Killian similarly advises Sherman McCoy to affect aloofness and indifference prior to his perp walk.

You don't say anything. You don't show any expression whatsoever. You don't cover your face, you don't hang your head. You don't even know they're there. You can't win with these assholes, so don't even try.

Ed Hayes, the lawyer Killian was modeled on, gives similar advice to his own clients.

External videos
- Perp walk of man accused of killing a police officer in Mobile, Ala., describing crime to reporters
- 2007 Perp walk of accused killer, remaining silent, in Queens, NY

=== Media ===
Reporters usually ask questions such as "Did you do it?" if the defendant is not known to have confessed to the crime, or "Why did you do it?" when they have. Usually defendants do not answer or even acknowledge, since by that point they have been advised, as required under the Fifth Amendment, of their right to remain silent. One exception was Emmanuel Torres, arrested in 1984 on suspicion of murdering a woman in the course of an attempted rape. He told reporters that the victim was a "slut" and deserved her fate. At trial he protested his innocence. His remarks during the perp walk were introduced into evidence, and he was convicted. Another defendant, in 1993, suspected of stealing Marilyn Monroe memorabilia, turned to face the cameras and apologized to his dead parents. Actor Judd Hirsch's son Alex, arrested in 1995 by Chicago police on drug charges that were later dropped, promoted an upcoming appearance by his band. An Ohio murder suspect once said "Hi Mom!" to the cameras.

Photographers find perp walks their second most-dreaded assignment after going to the home of someone who has recently died to ask for a picture. They must wait a long time for a period of a few seconds in which they will be competing with a potentially large group of other photographers and television crews. This presents the possibility that they can be trampled beneath the group, as depicted in the 1994 film The Paper, and the difficulty of photographing a defendant who may be looking downward to keep his face from view. Marty Lederhandler, an Associated Press photographer who worked for the last half of the 20th century and shot the perp walks of Julius and Ethel Rosenberg, as well as David Berkowitz, describes the perp walk as "it's, 'He'll be out in 10 minutes.' You line up. He comes out and into the car, and you've got your picture. Nice." When he began in the years after World War II, Lederhandler says, the media was more polite during perp walks than they are now. "We all had the same lenses those days, and everybody would stand 8 or 10 feet back, and nobody was pushing or shoving."

Some photographers have found creative ways around these limitations. Louie Liotta of The New York Post told John Tierney he holds his camera near the ground, pointing upward, and walks with it for a short distance, in order to get a shot of the defendant's face as he or she is ducking downwards to avoid the cameras. Andrew Savulich of the Daily News looks for unusual angles and juxtapositions, once putting the station house's sleeping cat in the foreground. To catch the defendant's face, he stands near the front door at the top of the steps. "For some reason, even when a guy has decided to duck his head, he usually lifts it for a second when he starts to go down steps", he explains. "You sometimes catch this lost-in-space look, the eyes fixed at a distance, as if he's trying very hard to be somewhere else." Jim Estrin of the Times says the police officers at the door sometimes block that shot for him, so he starts in the middle, shooting as he runs, and then gets on the other side of the police car for a shot as the defendant enters.

== Purpose ==
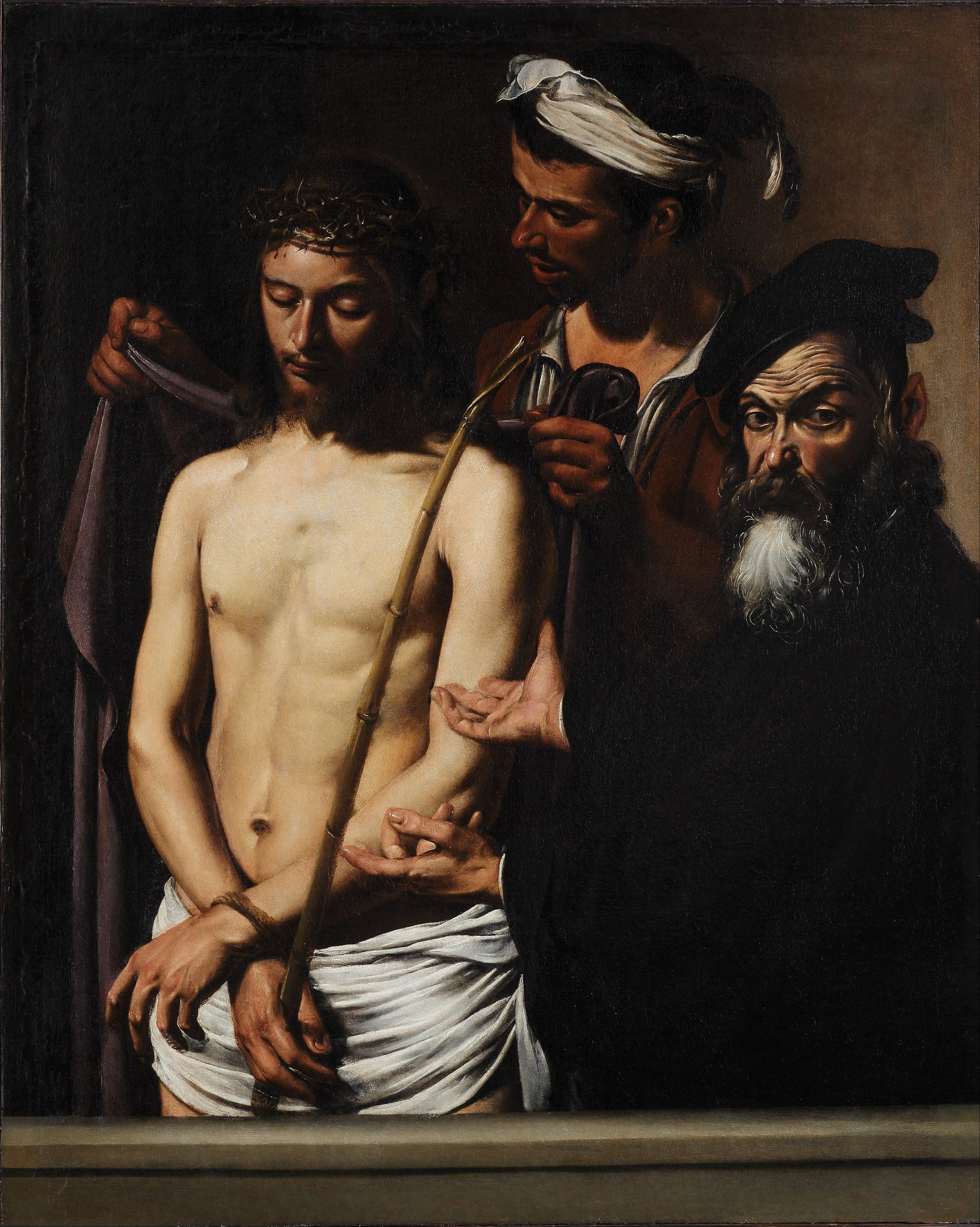
Ecce Homo, Caravaggio, 1605, depicting the Biblical story of Pontius Pilate presenting Jesus to a hostile crowd.

The perp walk has been described as primarily serving the interests of the police and the media rather than the defendant or justice. "Cynics might call the perp walk the crime reporter's red carpet", says crime reporter Art Miller. "Police and prosecutors get to show off their trophy. [We] lap it up because that's all we know we're going to get" since so many other aspects of the criminal justice system prior to trial take place out of public view, and even trials themselves may not always be televised or even photographed. "Those 30 seconds of a perp walk are the lifeblood to the TV news. Between that and the mug shot that is often all you got as visuals to tell a crime story." Retired NYPD detective Nicholas Casale likens it to a service: "It promotes the arrest, it allows the defendant an opportunity to make a statement to the press, and it's centralized".

Prosecutors say it sends a message that no one is above the law, and the likelihood of being perp-walked after arrest deters criminal behavior on the part of offenders, especially white-collar criminals, who might otherwise believe they could successfully avoid conviction. Mary Jo White, former United States Attorney for the Southern District of New York, the federal prosecutor's office that handles most crimes committed in the financial sector, believes perp walks in such cases restore investor confidence. Police say that the image of a suspect being taken into custody, when publicized, can encourage other witnesses to come forward with relevant information. Lastly, prosecutors may be trying to get an advantage in a bail hearing if they consider the defendant to be a flight risk, since it bolsters their case if the defendant apparently had to be arrested.

Outside of its tactical benefit to law enforcement, "[i]t does perform some social functions", says Tierney. "A community shaken by an act of deviancy wants reassurance that moral order has been restored, and a perp walk accomplishes this much more quickly than the courts can. But, then, so does a lynching." He argues its real social value lies in shaming:

For one brief moment, the perp loses the city's protective anonymity and feels, like Hester Prynne, the moral claustrophobia of a righteous community. Puritans can argue that this is good for the perp's soul, but let's not pretend we're doing it for his benefit. The perp walk is for everyone else. It honors the police, sells papers, boosts television ratings and entertains the public—all at the expense of a person who is supposed to have the presumption of innocence.

In a 2014 paper, Sandrine Boudana of Tel Aviv University agrees with Tierney's analysis in more academic terms, also evoking The Scarlet Letter, saying that the perp walk, like other shaming rituals, is "the physical representation of the isolation of an individual, who is exposed ... to the gaze of an anonymous mass of others who, by their position of viewers, physically express that they (still) belong to one homogeneous group." Following the lead of psychology, she differentiates shame from guilt in that the former divides the self by forcing those shamed to see themselves through the eyes of others while guilt leaves the self unified. "In the media ritual, this split is not imagined by the self but actually experienced."

"Interestingly," Boudana suggests, "in its performance, the perp walk reconciles Guy Debord and Michel Foucault's visions of modern society." In the 1970s, Foucault contrasted Debord's notions of the Spectacle as a key element of modern society with his own theories of the surveillance society, where the gaze is invisible. "The perp walk altogether turns justice into a spectacle and puts its audience under surveillance with the media offering the transparency of a virtual panopticon: the threat of media shaming should deter one from perpetrating criminal acts."

Financier Martin Shkreli's perp walk after his 2015 arrest on securities fraud charges led to another motive being acknowledged, especially in cases where a defendant had a strongly negative public perception, as Shkreli had since he had come to the public's attention several months earlier after dramatically raising the price of a drug used by AIDS patients and responding to the criticism in a manner widely seen as arrogant and self-absorbed: Schadenfreude, or the malicious joy taken in the sufferings of others. Many users of the social media platforms where Shkreli had gained that reputation responded to the arrest with taunting posts that included pictures of a handcuffed Shkreli, clad in a grey hoodie, being escorted by FBI agents from the Eastern District federal courthouse in Brooklyn where he was arraigned to a car taking him to detention until he made bail.

"Let's all look at the bad man in chains," Gawker exhorted readers, in the midst of pictures and tweets taunting Shkreli.

It seemed like he'd never stop gloating. But now we're the ones gloating, you see, because he's under arrest and facing securities fraud charges, and we're not. These pictures of the villain getting his comeuppance will soothe you ... These are the pictures you want to see.

"Shkreli's arrest and perp walk meets everyone's criteria for a satisfying experience—excepting Shkreli himself, of course," Vocativ commented. The hashtag #Shkrelifreude trended on Twitter for several days afterwards.

Writing for a panel of the Second Circuit Court of Appeals, federal judge Guido Calabresi found the perp walk serves the interests of both law enforcement and media. "[It] both publicizes the police's crime-fighting efforts and provides the press with a dramatic illustration to accompany stories about the arrest". He nevertheless held that perp walks that did not arise naturally from the transport of arrestees but rather were staged purely for media purposes violated the Fourth Amendment.

In a later Second Circuit decision upholding the general constitutionality of perp walks, Judge Fred I. Parker agreed that perp walks were primarily driven by media interest. "Whether the accused wrongdoer is wearing a sweatshirt over his head or an Armani suit on his back, we suspect that perp walks are broadcast by networks and reprinted in newspapers at least in part for their entertainment value." But he found them to serve a legitimate state interest as well:

[They] also serve the more serious purpose of educating the public about law enforcement efforts. The image of the accused being led away to contend with the justice system powerfully communicates government efforts to thwart the criminal element, and it may deter others from attempting similar crimes.

== Origins ==
Perp walks have historical antecedents in public spectacles around the administration of justice throughout history. Within the United States, again particularly in New York City, the process has evolved over time and through some celebrated instances.

=== Medieval Europe ===
In medieval Europe, the end of the judicial process, often an execution, was often its most public, and sometimes the only public, aspect. French philosopher Michel Foucault wrote in Discipline and Punish, his influential 1975 history of the evolution of criminal justice over the course of the Enlightenment:

In France, as in most European countries, with the notable exception of England, the entire criminal procedure, right up to the sentence, remained secret: that is to say, opaque, not only to the public but also the accused himself. It took place without him, or at least without his having any knowledge either of the charges or of the evidence.

At that point, "[i]t was the task of the guilty man to bear openly his condemnation and the truth of the crime he had committed." Convicts wore placards summing up their offense, and on the way to the gallows were stopped at churches to make an amende honorable, a ceremonial plea for forgiveness. The executions themselves were long, almost theatrical spectacles, such as the 1757 drawing and quartering of Robert-François Damiens for his attempted assassination of King Louis XV. A detailed account of that procedure, the last execution by that method in French history, opens Foucault's book.

In medieval England as well, those convicted of high treason were paraded through the streets in an open wagon to their executions. Originally they had been dragged by horses, but some arrived almost dead from that treatment, unable to live through the hanging, castration, disemboweling and drawing and quartering that followed. While being transported, they were often pelted with objects thrown at them by onlookers. "This was a symbolic process that led the criminal to oblivion," observed Charles Spencer in Killers of the King, his 2014 account of the regicides of Charles I, many of whom were executed this way. "The drawing through the streets provided a final, degrading journey from the living world."

In the 19th century, as penal-reform efforts began to succeed, imprisonment began to replace execution as the preferred punishment for egregious crimes, since it offered the possibility of the convict's eventual repentance. The spectacles surrounding execution became more restrained, even when those were held in public. By the middle of the century larger cities were establishing police departments, professionalizing the prevention and investigation of crime.

== In the United States ==
=== 1890s–1960s: Early years ===
In the United States, the perp walks dates back more than a century, to when cameras' shutter speed became fast enough to allow photography of a small group of individuals walking. It is believed to have been done even prior to Theodore Roosevelt's tenure as New York City police commissioner in the 1890s. The city's newspaper photographers soon ritualized it. J. Edgar Hoover, the first director of the Federal Bureau of Investigation (FBI), made sure the press could witness his agents bringing accused gangsters Alvin Karpis and Harry Campbell to justice.

One of the earliest precursors of the perp walk, before the term came into use, occurred in 1903. NYPD inspector George W. McClusky had arrested the principal members of the Morello crime family, one of the earliest dominant Mafia groups in the city, following the discovery of a mutilated, dismembered corpse later identified as a Morello associate from Buffalo in a barrel outside a Little Italy apartment house, the most notorious of the city's organized crime-related Barrel Murders around the turn of the 20th century. After they had been in lockup for a night, McClusky had the cuffed suspects marched through the streets of Little Italy, in full view of their fellow Italian immigrants, from police headquarters to the nearby Third Judicial District Courthouse for arraignment, claiming that the paddy wagons in which this would normally be done had not arrived as scheduled.

American Mafia historian Thomas Reppetto not only likens this to present-day perp walks but sees further historical precedents. Italian police of the era sometimes paraded arrested mafiosi before their communities as well, "dramatizing their powerlessness." Before them, the ancient Romans had done the same with prisoners of war.

Many of the immigrants watching the chained Morellos being walked past them were, The New York Times reported, believed to be supporting them. The police eventually had to disperse them when they feared an attempt was underway to free them from custody. "The papers liked such stories," Repetto wrote, "and so did the police. Portraying the Mafia as an all-powerful organization made their occasional victories seem all the more impressive."

ABC News reporter John Miller, who has also worked as a press secretary for law enforcement agencies, has identified three distinct stages in the evolution of the perp walk. Until the 1940s, suspects were paraded before reporters across a stage in the basement of police headquarters. The reporters decided if any would make a good story. After that period, reporters were assigned to individual station houses, and watched as suspects were booked and fingerprinted. They often were allowed to talk to them, and if any were deemed worthy of coverage a photo opportunity was usually provided. Bank robber Willie Sutton's legendary response (which he denied ever having made) of "Because that's where the money is" to a question about why he robbed banks, was said to have been uttered during a perp walk held in this fashion. A variant of the perp walk from this era, now no longer practiced, was the "confession shot" in which the defendant would be photographed signing or reviewing his written statement admitting to the crime.

Tony Dellernia's tortured facial expression in this photo drew widespread criticism, and led to a reprimand for Det. Albert Seedman

This era ended with the 1962 Borough Park Tobacco warehouse robbery in Brooklyn. Two detectives were killed; the first double homicide of NYPD officers in 30 years led to a massive manhunt. One of the accused robbers, Tony Dellernia, surrendered in Chicago. Upon his extradition to New York, he was perp-walked. Some photographers complained to the police at the Brooklyn precinct house where he was being held that they had missed it. Albert Seedman, a high-ranking detective, not only restaged it for reporters three hours after the original walk, he held up Dellernia's head so it would be visible. The defendant's pained expression, next to Seedman with a cigar stub in his mouth, "stretching the suspect's face as if it were pizza dough", as the New York Times put it years later, was captured in the photographs, leading to public outrage. Seedman, who later became the department's chief detective, knew he would regret it, and was later reprimanded. Another, Jerry Rosenberg, also surrendered. "He is the killer," Ray Martin, the detective in charge, told the press during the perp walk, "and he is going to burn for it." After his conviction, Rosenberg sued the city and Martin for that and alleged police brutality during his arrest. Representing himself, the beginning of his career as a jailhouse lawyer, Rosenberg won a small verdict against Martin in district court that was later reversed on appeal.

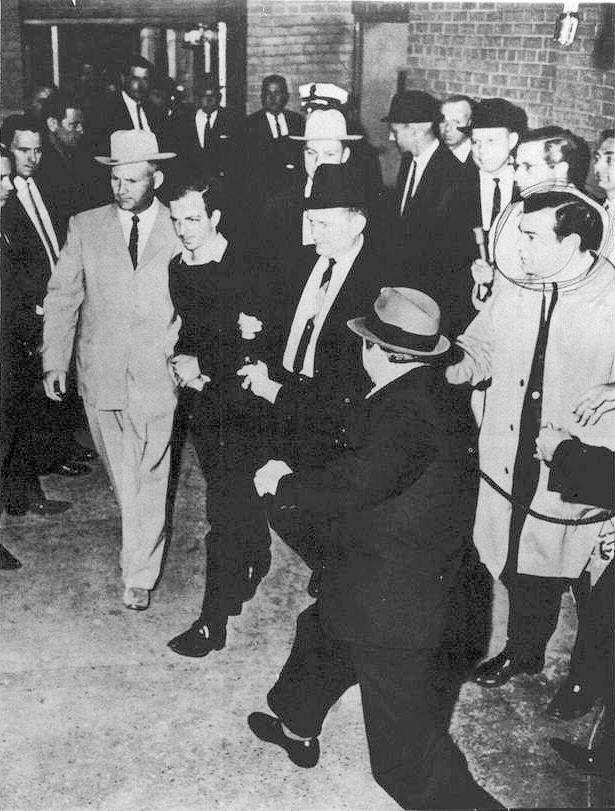
Lee Harvey Oswald at his perp walk, as Jack Ruby leans in to discharge his pistol.

The next year a perp walk ended with the defendant's death. After the assassination of President John F. Kennedy, Lee Harvey Oswald, suspected of the crime and the related killing of a Dallas police officer, was frequently taken before the media, whose questions he sometimes answered, at the police station where he had been arrested. During the perp walk for his transfer to the county jail, he was fatally shot on live television by Jack Ruby, a civilian who was a frequent visitor to the police station. As a result of that, security would be tightened on future perp walks to prevent similar killings.

=== 1960s–1980s: Televised perp walk ===
In New York, the rise of television news later in that decade led to other changes. Reporters came with camera crews, which could no longer be accommodated inside precinct houses. In 1969 a group of journalists, judges and police officers drew up guidelines for perp walks after a conference. "Law enforcement and court personnel should not prevent the photographing of defendants when they are in public places outside the courtroom", they read. "They should neither encourage nor discourage pictures or televising, but they should not pose the accused." A few years later they were formally adopted by the NYPD.

Later that decade, in 1977, an amused-looking David Berkowitz, the "Son of Sam" serial killer, was paraded in front of a large group of media after his arrest, a spectacle that calmed a city his murders had left on edge. Three years later, following Mark David Chapman's arrest after he killed John Lennon, police took precautions against the sort of revenge killing that had happened to Oswald.

=== 1980s–1990s: White-collar perp walks ===
In the 1980s, white-collar criminals began to be perp-walked as well, as federal prosecutors saw the public-relations value of the practice. During his tenure as United States Attorney for the Southern District of New York, Rudolph Giuliani often had Wall Street investment bankers perp-walked. Defendants such as Richard Wigton, a Kidder Peabody trader accused of insider trading, were arrested at their place of business and walked off a trading floor in handcuffs with a uniformed police escort, as Charlie Sheen's character Bud Fox is in Oliver Stone's 1987 film Wall Street. "Rudy Giuliani made an art form out of [the perp walk]", says Loyola Law School professor Laurie Levenson. Former Manhattan district attorney Robert Morgenthau agrees, calling Giuliani "the master of the perp walk".

At the same time, the term perp walk became common usage for the practice. New York Times language columnist William Safire found 1986 to be its earliest use in the media. His colleague John Tierney claims the term was in use among photographers and the police as early as the 1940s. Major figures in organized crime had always been perp-walked when arrested. Later in the 1980s, one of these, John Gotti, head of the Mafia's Gambino family, "took the perp walk to a whole new level", according to Miller. He made his walks wearing the expensive custom-tailored suits that earned him the "Dapper Don" nickname. Reporters would politely ask him how he was doing as he walked. A Times freelancer once asked him the question in formal Italian: "Buonasera, signore, come sta?". Gotti responded in kind "Bene, grazie" and turned to the cameras and smiled, giving the photographers and television cameras the memorable image they had sought.

During the Whitewater investigation in the 1990s, Susan McDougal, held in contempt for refusing to testify before special prosecutor Kenneth Starr's grand jury, was perp-walked wearing leg irons and a waist chain as well as handcuffs, which she wore over an ensemble consisting of a jacket, white blouse, miniskirt, black stockings and high heels. Starr was criticized for what was seen as a gratuitous attempt to humiliate an uncooperative witness. He claimed his office had nothing to do with the level of restraint she wore, and the marshals' service said that was standard for all prisoners in transit. In 1995 Oklahoma City bomber Timothy McVeigh, already in Oklahoma Highway Patrol custody for a firearms violation, was paraded before television cameras by the FBI nearly three hours before he was officially arrested for the bombing. His lawyers later asked to have eyewitness identifications of him excluded from evidence, on the grounds that they were all based on the widely televised perp walk and none of the witness had been asked to pick him out of a lineup.

=== 1990s–present: Legal challenges and resumption ===
Some of the NYPD's own officers were subjected to a notable perp walk in 1994. After a wide-ranging investigation found extensive corruption at the 30th Precinct in Harlem, a large group of officers were arrested in uniform and led out in handcuffs before the media. William Bratton, then the city's new police commissioner was present, holding a news conference to announce the arrests. He removed the officers' badges, with the cameras rolling, and threw them in the garbage.

In the late 1990s, the NYPD stopped doing perp walks when one led to a lawsuit. John Lauro, doorman at an Upper East Side apartment building, was arrested on theft charges in 1995. After his original perp walk, the detective, Michael Charles, did another one three hours later so a local television news crew could film the event. The charges were later dropped, and he filed a Section 1983 suit against Charles, the police and the city in federal court, arguing that the perp walk was an unreasonable seizure of his person that thus violated his Fourth Amendment rights. The judge agreed the perp walk violated the Fourth Amendment. On appeal that judgement was limited strictly to perp walks staged for the media.

At the same time, another suit challenged the constitutionality of perp walks per se. In 1999, the government of Westchester County, the suburban area directly to the north of New York City, had several of its correctional officers arrested for filing falsified injury claims. They were videotaped by county employees immediately after their arrest at government offices, then taken to be arraigned in a local court where county executive Andrew Spano gave a news conference on the arrests. It culminated with the defendants being perp-walked before the media present. The district court, relying on the Lauro case as precedent, found the perp walk constitutional since it was necessary for law enforcement to take the defendants to court for arraignment, a decision again upheld on appeal.

Perp walks resumed, with many corporate executives charged in the scandals of the early 2000s, such as Andrew Fastow and John Rigas, subjected to them. In 2003, former U.S. ambassador to Iraq Joseph C. Wilson evoked the perp walk, and provided another term for it, when accusing a senior Bush Administration official of leaking the name of his wife, Valerie a spy, to the media as retaliation for a New York Times op-ed in which he had cast doubt on key aspects of the administration's claims in support of the Iraq War: "It's of keen interest to me to see whether or not we can get Karl Rove frog-marched out of the White House in handcuffs." Liberal critics of the administration created images of that occurring; in 2008 a Code Pink protester in San Francisco attempted to make a citizen's arrest of Rove, who had by then left the government.

Back in Iraq, deposed dictator Saddam Hussein made what an American photographer present called "the ultimate perp walk", in restraints, escorted by two Iraqi security personnel, with a media presence, to the start of his trial in 2004. "I felt his anger at my camera, at me," Karen Ballard recalled, "and actually thought he might spit on me. He didn't know exactly what was about to happen and, suddenly, the formerly fierce dictator seemed small and disheveled." To her, and other observers, it symbolized the end of his reign and the beginning of hopes for a more democratic Iraq.

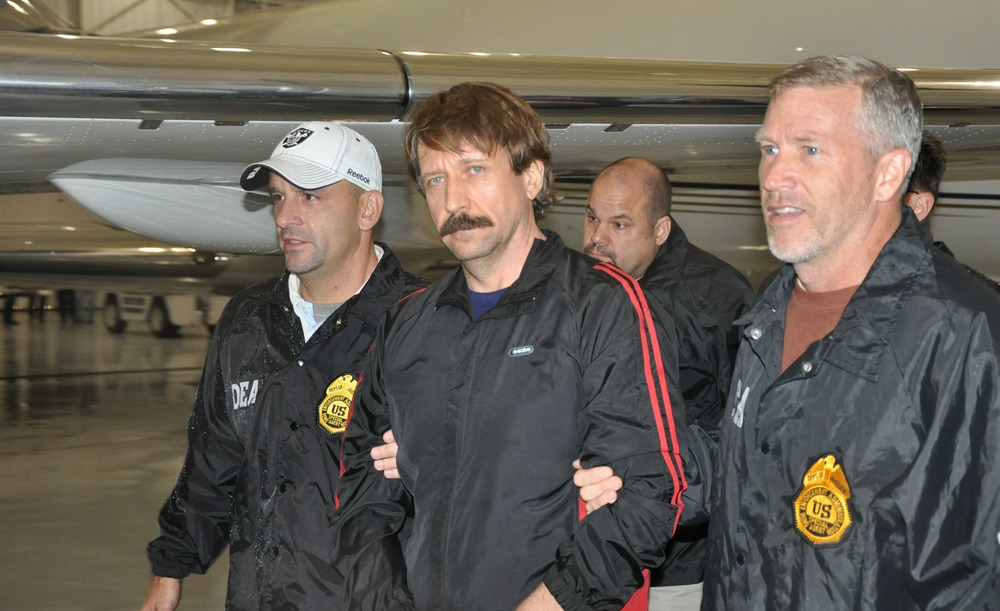
Viktor Bout's perp walk

In the first years of the next decade, two prominent foreign citizens were perp-walked by American law enforcement agencies. Viktor Bout, a Russian long wanted by the U.S. and other governments for arms smuggling, was arrested in Thailand and taken past waiting media by federal Drug Enforcement Administration agents upon his extradition in 2010. The next year, Dominique Strauss-Kahn, then director of the International Monetary Fund and considered a leading candidate to challenge Nicolas Sarkozy in the 2012 French presidential election, was arrested and charged with the attempted rape of a hotel housekeeper. French journalists covering the incident in New York were stunned into silence when a handcuffed Strauss-Kahn was brought by them. In France, where it is illegal to publish pictures of an identifiable person in handcuffs or police custody unless they have been convicted, the images sparked considerable public outrage.

Two months later, criticism of the perp walk resumed when Strauss-Kahn's bail terms were reduced from house arrest to his own recognizance after the office of Manhattan district attorney Cyrus Vance, Jr. found the housekeeper had been dishonest with them about other aspects of her story than the attack. Mayor Michael Bloomberg, who had earlier defended the perp walk, criticized it as "outrageous". City Councilman David G. Greenfield introduced legislation that would ban perp walks. "I honestly believe it's unconstitutional," he said. "If we banned it here we could send a message to the country." Police Commissioner Raymond Kelly said the media was to blame, not his department. "If they make a decision to stake out a location when someone is walked out of the front of a precinct ... it's not a decision that the Police Department makes", he said. "We have been walking prisoners out of the front doors of stationhouses for 150 years in the Police Department ... This is how we transport people to court ... I don't think the genie's ever gonna be put back inside the bottle. That's the way it is." The legislation was seen as unlikely to pass.

=== Legality ===
In the 1931 Near v. Minnesota decision, the United States Supreme Court held that laws limiting what could be published, called prior restraint, infringed on the freedom of the press guaranteed by the First Amendment to the Constitution. "The fact that the liberty of the press may be abused by miscreant purveyors of scandal", wrote Chief Justice Charles Evans Hughes, "does not make any the less necessary the immunity of the press from previous restraint." Later the Court would allow a limited exception for national security purposes, in the Pentagon Papers case, New York Times Co. v. United States.

In the early 1980s a series of cases established the right of the press to cover all aspects of criminal proceedings in court. The first, Richmond Newspapers v. Virginia, held that the right to be informed about government action was specifically protected by the Constitution. Judges may still close criminal court proceedings to the media if they believe that coverage would create a "substantial probability" of denying the defendant his or her right to a fair trial, but must state their reasons for doing so on the record.

With this underlying law, no defendant had challenged the constitutionality of the perp walk prior to John Lauro. Despite criticisms that it undermined the presumption of innocence, defendants who had been convicted or pleaded guilty never claimed their rights had been violated by the perp walk, and could not claim injury to reputation from it. Lauro, who had been perp-walked only to have the charges later dropped, was the first claimant to have standing.

==== Lauro v. Charles ====
In 1995 Lauro, doorman at a small Upper East Side apartment building, was arrested on burglary charges after a resident sent video from a hidden camera to police that apparently showed Lauro stealing from his apartment while on vacation. After his arrest the detectives were told he should be taken on a perp walk for cameras from a local TV station, to which the tenant had licensed his surveillance video. He was taken, in handcuffs, out to a police car, driven around the block and walked back into the building.

While the video showed Lauro looking through the tenant's drawers and closets, it did not show him taking anything. On further investigation the tenant, who had allowed Lauro to enter his apartment during his vacation to water plants and deliver mail, could not identify any missing items in the areas Lauro had looked through. The charges were reduced to attempted petit larceny, a misdemeanor, and adjourned in contemplation of dismissal. Lauro, who had been fired, was unable to get his job back.

Lauro filed a Section 1983 lawsuit against the city, the police department and Detective Michael Charles in federal court for the Southern District of New York. He alleged the arrest and perp walk violated his rights under the Fourth, Sixth, Eighth and Fourteenth amendments. Judge Allen G. Schwartz held in 1999 that the arrest was lawful but the perp walk was not.

"The perp walk conducted with plaintiff", Schwartz wrote, "was a seizure that intruded on plaintiff's privacy interests and personal rights, and was conducted in a manner designed to cause humiliation to plaintiff with no legitimate law enforcement objective or justification." He found it even more humiliating than the police stops approved by the Supreme Court in Terry v. Ohio. "In addition to the indignity of the walk itself is the fact that the police were aware that the walk was to be featured on the Fox 5 News and exposed to the entire New York metropolitan area. All this in a nation where an accused is presumed to be innocent until proven otherwise."

He ruled that Charles was not entitled to qualified immunity for his actions since Ayeni v. Mottola, a previous decision of the Second Circuit Court of Appeals, which has appellate jurisdiction over New York, held that unnecessary media exposure by law enforcement was unconstitutional. (Note: In that case a crew from a CBS-TV newsmagazine show, Street Stories, had been allowed to accompany Secret Service agents executing a search warrant.) Charles appealed to the Second Circuit himself, arguing that no court had held the perp walk unconstitutional. The next year, 2000, a panel of three judges agreed and reversed the district court, while still finding a constitutional violation.

Charles relied on two precedents, the Supreme Court's Paul v. Davis and the Second Circuit's own Rosenberg v. Martin, Jerry Rosenberg's case, to support his argument that the injury to Lauro's reputation did not in itself deprive him of his constitutional rights. (Note: In Paul, a man who, like Lauro, was arrested on a petit larceny charge that was never formally disposed, sued a local police chief for including his name and photograph on a list of "known and active shoplifters" distributed to local retailers.) Writing for the panel, Guido Calabresi, former dean of Yale Law School, rejected those two arguments since in neither case had the plaintiffs asserted a Fourth Amendment violation, as Lauro had. He turned to the perp walk itself, which he agreed seemed to be a question of first impression.

He looked to Ayeni and Wilson v. Layne, decided by the Supreme Court the year before, as precedents. In the latter case the Court had unanimously held it was unconstitutional for reporters to accompany federal marshals executing an arrest warrant in a private residence since their presence served no valid law enforcement purpose. Since the two cases involved private homes with a reasonable expectation of privacy, he distinguished Lauro's by noting the perp walk had occurred on a public street and sidewalk in front of the police station.

Instead, what rendered Lauro's perp walk a violation of his rights was that it had been staged. "Even assuming that there is a legitimate state interest in accurate reporting of police activity," Calabresi wrote, "that interest is not well served by an inherently fictional dramatization of an event that transpired hours earlier." He declined to rule on the constitutionality of perp walks as a general issue since that question was not before the court, and held that Charles indeed had qualified immunity because the facts of Ayeni were not sufficiently identical with Lauro's case to consider it settled law as of 1995.

==== Caldorola v. County of Westchester ====
As the district court was getting ready to rule on Lauro's case, another challenge to the perp walk was beginning. In 1998 the Department of Corrections in Westchester County just north of New York City began investigating whether several of its corrections officers were falsely claiming disability benefits. Video surveillance found four were seemingly more active than their claimed disabilities would allow, and a fifth was living outside the state in violation of a residency requirement.

They were charged with third-degree grand larceny, a felony, and arrested at DOC offices. County employees videotaped them being led, handcuffed, to vehicles after their arrest. At a press conference that afternoon, County Executive Andrew Spano announced the arrests and showed the surveillance video. He told the reporters the defendants were being arraigned at a nearby municipal court, and the defendants were made to wait until the media could film them being led into the courthouse.

They filed suit in the Southern District, alleging that the maximized media exposure of their perp walk violated their Fourth Amendment rights even though it had not been staged as Lauro's had. In 2001 Judge Colleen McMahon ruled for the county. Videotaping the defendants under arrest on county property did not violate their privacy, since "[t]he fact that a person can be found in a particular place at a particular time does not give rise to some possessory interest, and it would be unreasonable to conclude otherwise." In fact, she wrote, "[p]laintiffs have not identified any possessory interest they had in not being videotaped, and this [c]ourt can think of none." On the other hand, the county could have had many reasons for videotaping the defendants, such as protecting itself from later accusations of abuse or other improper conduct.

McMahon agreed with the plaintiffs that the arrests were "choreographed", but distinguished their perp walks from Lauro's: "[T]he footage shot in this case was 'reality television' (albeit with scripted stage directions). Plaintiffs were actually being transported for arrest processing, so what was filmed was legitimate law enforcement activity—not a wholly fictitious event." In conclusion, she went further than the appeals court had in Lauro.

The [s]tate does have a legitimate interest in the accurate reporting of police activity, and to that end is free to advise the press about events related to a suspect's arrest, processing and arraignment, including events that by their nature will rise to "photo opportunities" and Kodak moments ... The fact is, plaintiffs' arrest was a newsworthy event. The press could not be kept from covering it, and the police are not constitutionally compelled to make their job more difficult.

On appeal, a panel composed of judges Fred I. Parker, Dennis Jacobs (now the Second Circuit's chief judge), and Sonia Sotomayor (later elevated to the Supreme Court) affirmed the district court. For the panel, Parker elaborated on the defendants' minimal expectation of privacy on the property where they were arrested, saying it was irrelevant that the media were not generally allowed there: "DOC employees ... are generally aware that it is their employer's prerogative, not their own, to decide who may have access to DOC grounds ... [They] could have no reasonable expectation that other County employees would be excluded from access to DOC property merely because [they] had been arrested." His opinion otherwise echoed McMahon's, and reaffirmed Lauro's distinction between residential and public spaces where privacy interests are at stake.

=== Reactions ===
The perp walk has been both criticized and defended by lawyers, journalists, politicians and the general public, both inside and outside the United States.

==== Legal reactions ====
In a footnote to his decision in the Lauro case, Judge Schwartz made his distaste for all perp walks clear.

... this Court is convinced beyond doubt that the perp walk procedure is not designed nor intended for the purpose of information dissemination, but rather for the purposes of incident dramatization and arrestee humiliation. The procedure is excessively harsh on the arrestee, and furthers the goal of information dissemination no more effectively than other more conventional and less intrusive methods that have been permitted by the courts.

Critics have also said it is detrimental to the presumption of innocence. "It's a way for the police to try their case in the press and to get the intimation of guilt by virtue of an arrest," says New York Civil Liberties Union director Donna Lieberman. "The question is, does it poison the right to a fair trial? And that depends on each case." Nat Hentoff of the Village Voice observed that "[u]nder such circumstances, even Mother Teresa would look extremely suspicious, especially if her hands were cuffed behind her back." Acknowledging a common response to such criticisms, that no arrested defendant is spared the perp walk, law professor Patricia Williams says "the perp walk is a social equalizer all right, but not in a good way" since the United States leads the world in incarceration rates. "[It] is hardly the greatest icon of equal rights".

The case of Richard Wigton has been cited as an example of the destructive effects of a perp walk. At the behest of Rudolph Giuliani, then U.S. Attorney for the Southern District of New York, Wigton, then head of risk arbitrage at now-defunct Kidder Peabody was arrested at his office on insider trading charges in 1987. He sobbed openly as he was walked in handcuffs past his coworkers. Three months later the charges against him and an associate were dropped, supposedly to seek an expanded indictment that never came. Giuliani's successor closed the investigation, by which time Wigton had been forced into retirement. Shortly before his death in 2007, Wigton said that he was a "victim of Giuliani's ambition."

Legal criticism of the perp walk is not limited to the defense bar. Charles Hynes, former district attorney for New York City's borough of Brooklyn, opposed perp walks and refused to have those his office prosecuted subjected to them. In her novel Final Jeopardy, Linda Fairstein, former head of the Manhattan district attorney's sex crimes unit, has her main character, prosecutor Alexandra Cooper, ask a detective to hold off on the perp walk until all the victims have had the chance to pick the defendant out of a police lineup, since defense lawyers were often able to exclude such identifications made after the perp walk had been broadcast.

==== Journalistic reactions ====
Some journalists have criticized the behavior of their colleagues covering perp walks. Stephen Stock, investigative reporter for WFOR-TV in Miami, argues that "showing this 'walk' in such circumstances is exploitative" and might be viewed as "knocking someone down a peg," if they were already well-known. "Perp walks are often the very first 'money shots' of a high-profile crime case," says Lori Waldon, news director for Milwaukee station WISN. "Those first images are important when the story breaks. But we also know that the perp walk often looks and feels like a circus. Unfortunately, those images often portray journalists at their worst."

In particular, Waldon criticizes reporters asking questions like "'Did you kill your wife?'" "It's those silly questions that elevate a perp walk to a circus. That's the stuff of a Saturday Night Live skit. I think any question that's insulting, presumptuous or bullying is totally off limits." Crime reporter Art Harris suggests that such questions are not designed to elicit real answers: "Usually you get no response. The journalists who shout probably know they are not going to get an answer but the reporter gets the voice on tape and his boss says, 'Hey, hey he is out there doing his job.'"

The images are often broadcast in slow motion. "Everyone looks guilty when they're slo-mo'ed" says Waldon. She is particularly critical of the reuse of the perp walk repeatedly throughout coverage of the case, suggesting that "Those images become caricatures." Boudana focuses on the images of the perp walk in the media, rather than the information they convey, as damaging the presumption of innocence. "[They] do not only identify the suspect; they stage the 'being a suspect', that is, they offer a performance that frames our attention."

Edward Wasserman, a journalist and later journalistic ethics professor, observed that "U.S. practices are rooted in an adversarial principle—that the criminal-justice system, like any governmental function, needs to be watched carefully and held accountable publicly by a skeptical watchdog press ... Yet with criminal suspects, the media routinely operate not as a check on the prosecutorial state but as its servant, and unwittingly mete out punishments that are less deliberate, less proportionate, less deserved, and far less accountable than those pronounced by judges."

==== Strauss-Kahn case ====
Dominique Strauss-Kahn being perp-walked by New York City police
- Image of Strauss-Kahn with his hands behind his back accompanied by police detectives on either side

In 2011, detectives from the New York City Police Department's Special Victims Unit walked a handcuffed Dominique Strauss-Kahn past waiting reporters on the way to his arraignment on charges of sexually assaulting a hotel housekeeper. His case drew significant attention since he was, at the time, director of the International Monetary Fund and considered a leading candidate to challenge Nicolas Sarkozy in the 2012 French presidential election. The charges were later dismissed.

The police department's handling of the Strauss-Kahn case was heavily criticized in his native France. Élisabeth Guigou, who as French minister of justice in 2000 had lobbied successfully for the passage of a law that forbids the publication of any images of an identifiable defendant in handcuffs who has not yet been convicted, criticized the walk, stating: "I found that image to be incredibly brutal, violent and cruel ... I don't see what the publication of images of this type adds." Another former member of the French cabinet, Jack Lang, Minister of Culture in the early 1980s, likened the perp walk to a lynching. French Senator Jean-Pierre Chevènement, a longtime acquaintance of Strauss-Kahn's, wrote on his blog that "The heart can only contract before these humiliating and poignant images ... A horrible global lynching! And what if it were all a monstrous injustice?" The French newspaper Le Monde editorialized: "When one of the world's most powerful men is turned over to press photos, coming out of a police station handcuffed, hands behind his back, he is already being subjected to a sentence which is specific to him ... Is it necessary that a man's fame deprive him of his presumption of innocence in the media? Because if they must assuredly be equal before the justice system, all men are not equal before the press."

The Conseil supérieur de l'audiovisuel (CSA), the agency of the French government which oversees broadcast media, reminded television stations there that it was still illegal to broadcast footage of the perp walk, as some did, even though it took place overseas. Violators could face a fine as high as €15,000; but the CSA said it would leave it to Strauss-Kahn to pursue complaints. French journalists such as Olivier Ravanello, deputy managing editor at i-Télé, stated that the law was inapplicable to criminal proceedings in foreign countries, stating that "We can't cover the DSK story like a French story for the simple reason it is happening in the U.S. The images we saw are brutal indeed, but that's because of the nature of the U.S. judiciary."

Not all French observers reacted negatively. Eva Joly, who as a magistrate brought corruption charges against Strauss-Kahn (of which he was later acquitted) and was herself expected to run for the French presidency on the Europe Écologie-The Greens line, agreed that the images were "very violent" but noted that the American system "doesn't distinguish between the director of the I.M.F. and any other suspect. It's the idea of equal rights" and pointed out that while American prosecutors always have to convince a jury of the defendant's guilt, their French counterparts must only do so in the most serious cases.

New York City mayor Michael Bloomberg agreed it was humiliating, but defended the practice, stating: "If you don't want to do the perp walk, don't do the crime. I don't have a lot of sympathy for that." New York novelist Jay McInerney observed, "The mayor seems to have forgotten about the presumption of innocence, but his statement probably reflects the attitude of his constituents pretty accurately. New York's a tough place. Deal with it." Seven weeks later, when doubts about the accuser's credibility made it unlikely the case would be tried, Bloomberg reversed position, stating: "I've always thought perp walks were outrageous ... [W]e vilify them for the benefit of theater, for the circus. You know they did it in Roman times, too."

American-born British journalist Janet Daley remarked that the uproar in the French media over Strauss-Kahn's treatment missed the point about America's robustly open society: "The U.S. does not like secrets. Its political culture takes as a basic premise that nothing should take place out of the public view except the most critical life-or-death security matters ... And it certainly has no privacy law of the kind that has protected the great and powerful in France for generations."

A paper by Israeli researcher Sandrine Boudana two years later analyzed responses to the Strauss-Kahn perp walk in French and American print media within the context of the countries' respective cultures. While the predominant theme was French media condemning the practice and American media defending it, commentators on both sides took the occasion to reflect inwardly. Some American writers said the French had a point, and French writers in turn noted the difficulty of enforcing the Guigou law in an era where technology cannot prevent the images it forbids from being viewed in France when published overseas. Others noted that the incident also showed the pitfalls of the French media's practice of not reporting on the private lives of politicians, noting that rape allegations had been raised earlier about Strauss-Kahn on a French talk show with no media followup.

==== Responses and defenses ====
John Tierney says that without the perp walk, reporters "would start buying old snapshots and home videos from disgruntled relatives and neighbors" and use them to depict the defendant, and those images might be more invasive and prejudicial. Some broader social benefits have been suggested, in particular transparency. The perp walk allows the police to demonstrate that they did not physically abuse the defendant upon arrest or during the subsequent interrogation.

New York City Major Michael Bloomberg stated that "Our judicial system works where the public can see the alleged perpetrators." Art Miller dismisses concerns that the perp walk prejudices the jury pool: "This is not Napoleonic justice where the judge is the fact finder, prosecutor and jury. Here the people will decide ultimately. And no matter who you are, if you have been arrested for something, it is understood you are going to be subject to all the scrutiny the press is going to give you." Israeli researcher Boudana admits that, on a purely informational level, the perp walk itself is harmless. "Indeed, from the moment when the press releases the names of suspects and the motive for their arrest, the persons are identifiable and their presumption of innocence seems to be already compromised," she observes. In a Slate on public shaming as punishment, Emily Bazelon wrote that Americans have become too accustomed to perp walks for them to have any stigmatizing effect. "[It's] become part of the wallpaper of the American criminal justice system," she wrote.

Her description of the American perp walk as a "circus" notwithstanding, Lisa Taylor is opposed to remedies like France's Guigou Law which forbid such photos from being published. "People who have been treated unfairly should have civil remedies, but to be that prescriptive to put a blanket on coverage, this freedom of expression proponent is nervous about a prohibition of photographing and publishing anything." Al Tompkins of the Poynter Institute says the remedy for the perp walk's effect is to:

Allow cameras inside the courtroom. If journalists can capture video of the accused in court, there is no need to chase him down the sidewalk. The courtroom video is likely to show the accused in a better light, the same setting in which a jury would see them.

== In other countries ==
In Canada, reporters are similarly allowed to witness defendants being brought to court in restraints, and photograph it. However, Toronto Metropolitan University journalism professor Lisa Taylor says that such activities, were they undertaken deliberately to shame or humiliate a defendant, could lead to "a legal claim for abuse of legal process". This, she explains, helps avoid "the deliberate or circus atmosphere that so often surrounds high-profile arrests in the States."

Policies elsewhere in the world vary. In Britain and France defendants are brought to court in vans with blacked-out windows. In some other European countries the accused's name may not be published, or the media decline to, in order to make it easier for an offender to resume normal life after release. Edward Wasserman speculates that criticism of European criminal-justice systems in light of a perceived rise in crime stemming from immigration, and the availability of suppressed or unreported information online, may lead to a greater openness there. "The next U.S. export to join Starbucks and iPads in the Old World may yet be the perp walk."

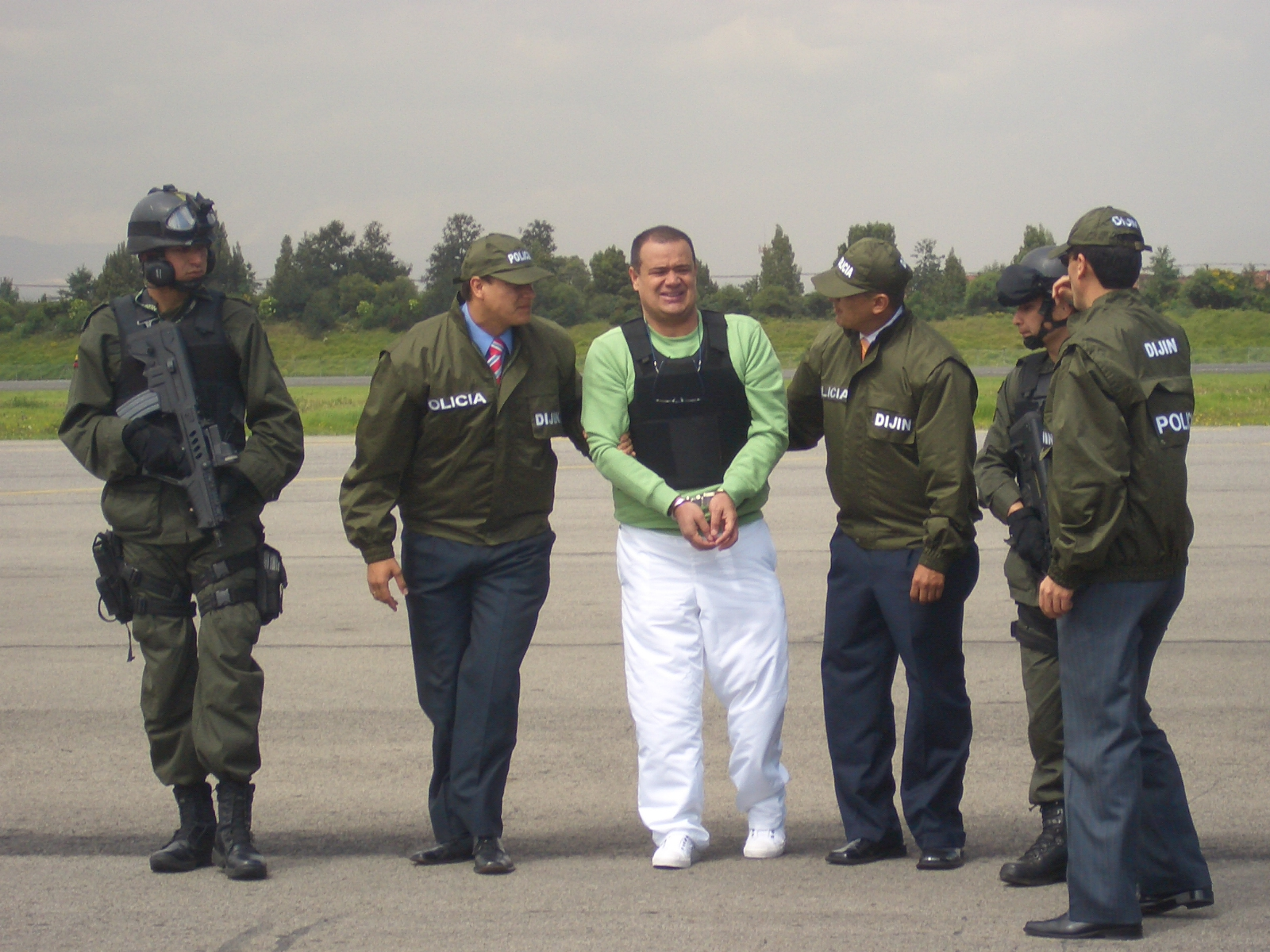
Colombian drug trafficker Luis Hernando Gómez photographed in custody prior to his 2007 extradition to the U.S.

Similar practices, some involving exposure and potential incrimination of the defendant, exist outside Europe and North America. Police in some Latin American countries have those arrested confess to the crime before the cameras. In Mexico, the equivalent practice is called a presentacion (Spanish for 'introduction'). Defendants suspected of involvement in the drug trade are posed for pictures surrounded by weapons, cash, and drugs, clothed in whatever they were wearing when arrested. Presentaciones have drawn criticisms similar to those directed at the perp walk.

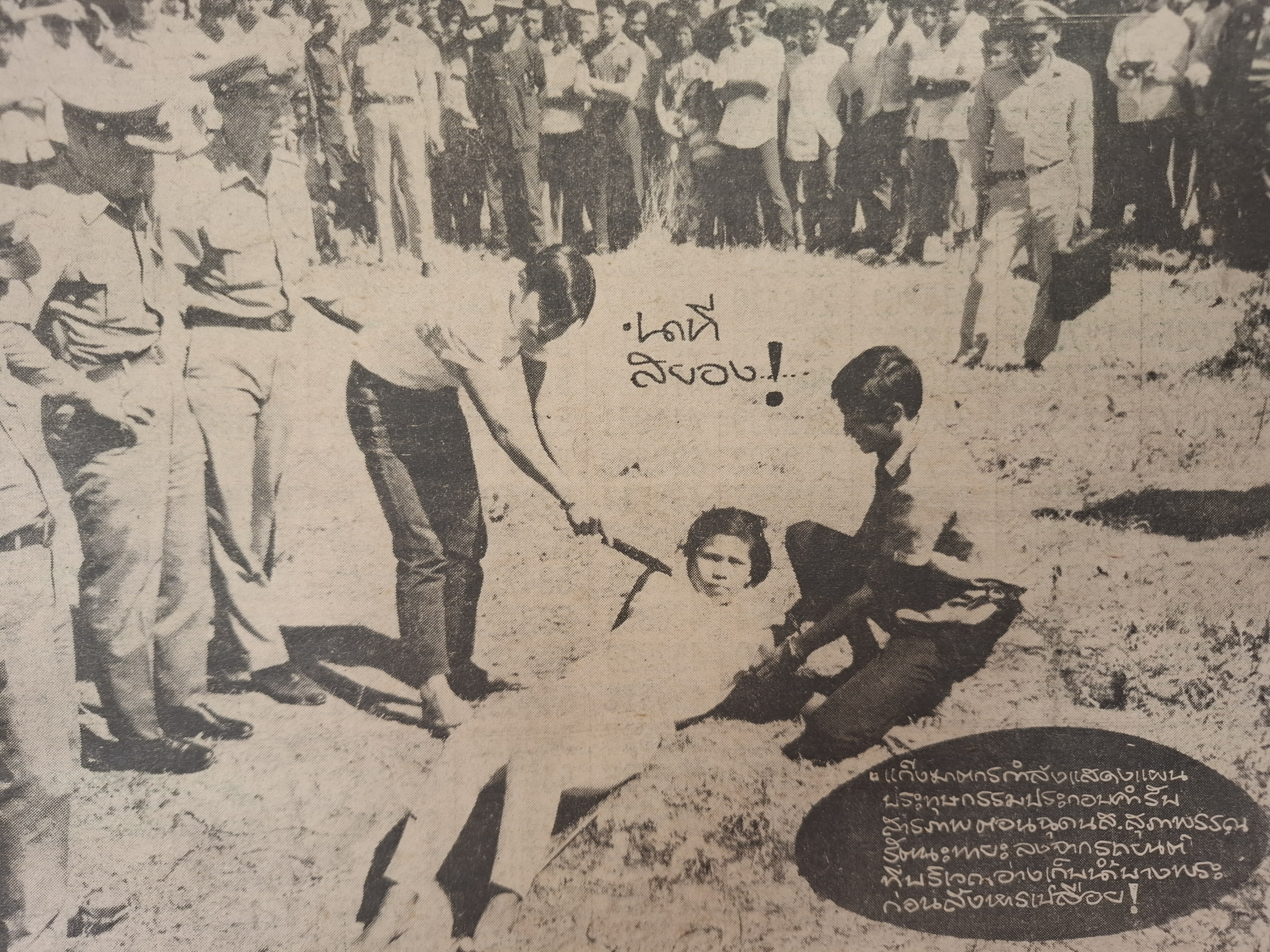
Thammasart librarian killer, pimp and robber Twat Sutakul a.k.a. Piek Chaloem-Thai and Somsak Pathan re-enact the crime at Bang Phra Reservoir, Chon Buri

In some Asian countries an arrested suspect is also exposed to the media. Police in Japan and South Korea often invite the media to re-enactments of crimes staged by the accused, a practice common in Thailand as well. In 2010, South Korean police had a man suspected of raping a child re-enact the crime at the scene, with not only the media but angry, jeering neighbors looking on. Prosecutors there also frequently parade white-collar suspects before the media, although even convicted felons can bring cases against them for an offense against honor. China, where images of chained suspects have often been broadcast to deter crime, ended in 2010 a long practice of forcing suspected prostitutes to walk in "shame parades" through the streets, after public outrage.

In 2011, police and other security forces in Iraq began making similar displays of suspected insurgents and other criminals. Two defendants were taken to crime scenes to recount their role in a massacre to assembled media, while alleged members of a gang of robbers were posed behind tables stacked with the goods they had supposedly stolen. In one instance that officials later admitted they lost control of, suspected terrorists were led into an auditorium where the acting Minister of the Interior attempted to detail their crimes before not only the media but an audience of the family members of the victims. He was unable to finish as members of the latter group interrupted him with calls for the defendants' execution and shoeing attempts. These practices increased after U.S. troops left Iraq. When the government announced an arrest warrant against former deputy prime minister Tariq al-Hashimi, who had fled to the Kurdish-controlled regions of the country, it broadcast the confessions of three of his bodyguards to support charges that he had ordered the assassinations of rivals. This, and the other public displays of accused criminals, was criticized by foreign observers and some Iraqi officials. "It is a crime to put this on television" said one of the latter. "It is a shame, and it is a legacy of the former dictator." Security officials responded that they were trying to assure the Iraqi public that they were actively working to protect them and apprehend terrorists. "If we say we caught the leader of Al Qaeda, who will believe it?" said an Interior Ministry official. "This is to show credibility. We are sure we are doing the right thing."

In the United Kingdom photographing or filming defendants on court premises is illegal under section 41 of the Criminal Justice Act 1925. and the Contempt of Court Act 1981. Former EDL leader Tommy Robinson was arrested for violating these statutes on May 10, 2017 when he tried to film suspected 'Muslim pedophiles' two days earlier.

In Italy in 1983, Enzo Tortora was subjected to a perp walk "in the late morning, only after all the journalists had been duly warned and were able to film him with the handcuffs on his wrists, while he was taken to the Regina Coeli prison. The monster is served." Public indignation after the acquittal of Tortora, declared fully not guilty, led to the victory of the yes vote in the referendum to strengthen the civil liability of judges in Italy.

In El Salvador, during the 2022–23 Salvadoran gang crackdown, prisoners have been frog marched.

== See also ==
- Crime in New York City
- Media circus
- Mug shot
- Trial by media
- Walk of shame
- Luigi Mangione's perp walk
