= Michael Fiaschetti =

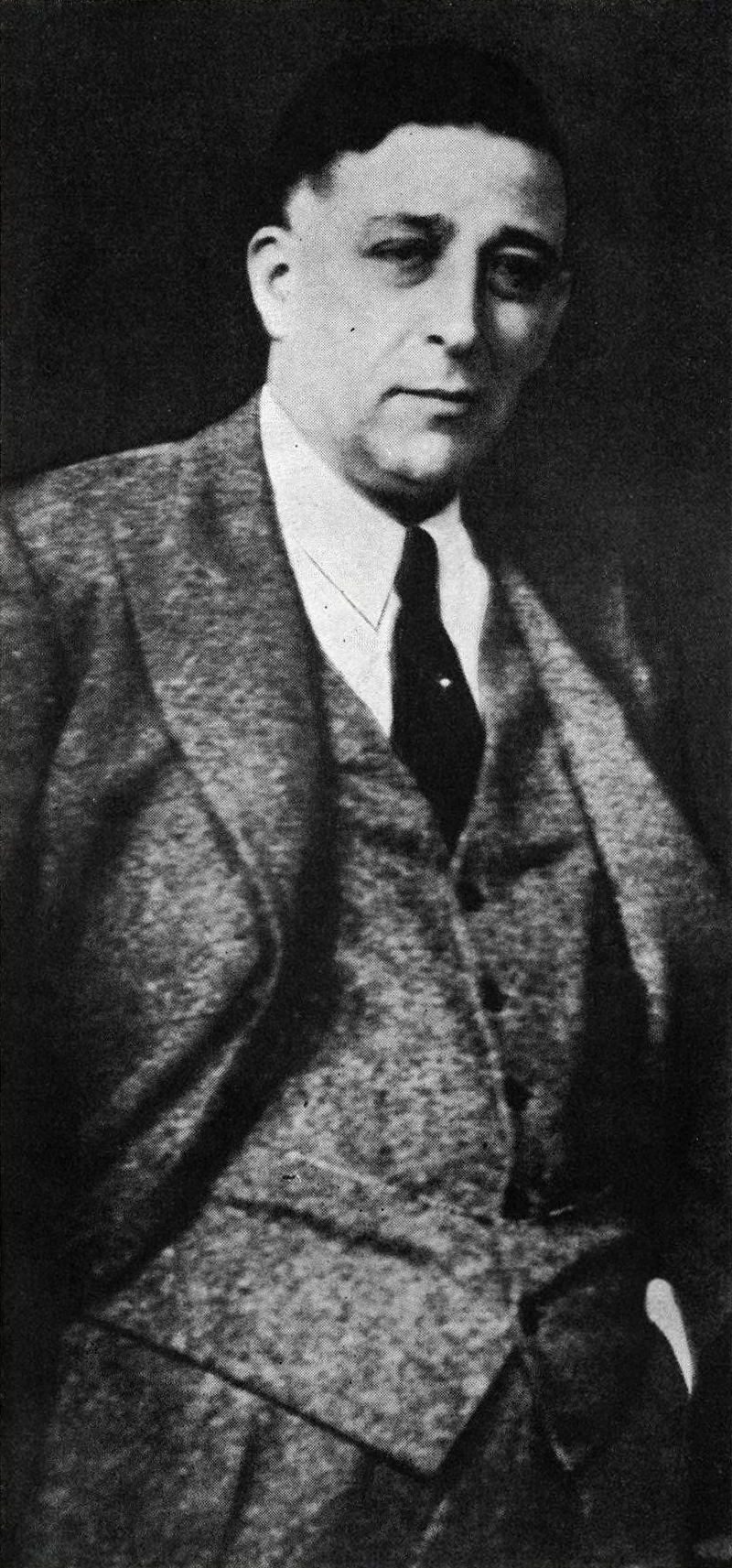
- Fiaschetti c. 1934

2nd Commander of the Italian Squad, New York Police Department
- In office 1918–1922
- Commissioner: Arthur Woods; Frederick Hamilton Bugher
- Preceded by: Joseph Petrosino
- Succeeded by: Office abolished

Deputy Commissioner of Public Markets, Weights, and Measures of the City of New York
- In office 1931–1937
- Appointed by: Fiorello La Guardia
- Preceded by: John Joseph Delaney
- Succeeded by: Alex Pisciotta

Personal details
- Born: January 8, 1882 Morolo, Kingdom of Italy
- Died: July 29, 1960 (aged 78) New York City, U.S.
- Occupation: Law enforcement officer, criminologist, private investigator, author, bureaucrat
- Police career
- Department: New York Police Department (NYPD)
- Service years: 1908–1922
- Rank: Detective

Michael Fiaschetti (January 8, 1882 – July 29, 1960) was a prominent New York detective and succeeded Lt. Joseph Petrosino as head of the NYPD's "Italian Squad".

== Early career ==
He was born in Morolo, Italy on January 8, 1882. He migrated with his parents to the United States in 1896 and was raised in North Adams, Massachusetts before joining the New York Police Department at the age of 22. He was one of those hand picked by Petrosino to join the then five man unit known as the "Italian Squad" soon after joining in 1908.

Following the death of Petrosino in 1909, the unit remained inactive as police officials were hesitant to risk another assassination of the high-profile group. However, while remaining on regular precinct duty, the group continued to work together from time to time on specific cases involving Italian-Americans and Black Hand bombings and extortion.

== Head of the Italian Squad ==
In 1918, New York Police Commissioner Arthur Woods officially reformed the Italian Squad with Fiaschetti as commander. He was also assigned a partner, Irving O'Hara, who served as his bodyguard from a possible assassination attempt.

In 1921, like Petrosino had before him, Fiaschetti traveled to Naples in pursuit of a camorrista fugitive and, while in the Neapolitan underworld, attempt to gain information on the individual who had ordered Petrosino's death. However, while the Italian government assigned numerous detective to follow Fiaschetti, the New York detective instead went undercover posing as Don Pasquale. Although he had found evidence that Don Vito Cascio Ferro may have not been responsible, he was forced to leave when he had been in attendance at a meeting in which Camorra leaders had been informed of Fiaschetti's presence and were attempting to get a description of him.

Although a protégé of Petrosino, his own methods differed from his predecessors including his preference in working with a network of police informants in favor of undercover surveillance and other standard investigative procedures. He also professed a low opinion of the criminal underworld code of omertà, disregarding the reluctance of criminals to a deathbed confession both out of uselessness as well as retribution to family members. However, he had stated to have had much more success with police informant when given a choice between prison and protecting an accomplice.

During his career, Fiaschetti frequently dealt with the Black Hand as well as other organized crime figures and criminals in New York's Little Italy and throughout the city such as the Black hand kidnap-murder of five-year-old Giuseppe Varotta on May 21, 1921. One particular criminal figure he would often battle throughout his career was Giosue Gallucci, the dominant racketeer of Italian East Harlem, as well helping convict Cleveland mobster Rosario Borgio (receiving two gold medals from the Mayor for his efforts) before Fiaschetti's retirement from the New York police force in 1922, resulting in the permanent disbanding of the Italian Squad.

== Later years ==
Although he had been forced into retirement after having a lawyer-politician removed from the premises after interrupting an interrogation, he was brought back by reform Mayor Fiorello La Guardia in the early 1930s as deputy commissioner of the Department of Markets in an attempt to investigate racketeering in New York's produce industry.

In 1938, he returned to private detective work following the elimination of his position and continued lecturing on organized crime throughout the country as well as taking part in training programs for the Army Reserve until his death at Brooklyn's Veterans Administration Hospital on July 29, 1960.

== Writings ==
He would later describe his career and the history of the Italian Squad in his autobiography The Man They Couldn't Escape (1928) and You Gotta Be Rough: The Adventures of Detective Fiaschetti of the Italian Squad (1930), the latter based on a series of articles by John Prosper for Liberty between April and July 1929 .

New York City Police Department
Preceded by Joseph Petrosino	NYPD's Italian Squad; 1918-1922	Succeeded by N/A
