= Tomasso Petto =

American mobster and contract killer

Tomasso "The Ox" Petto (c. 1879 – October 21, 1905) was a New York mobster and leading hitman in the Morello crime family during the early 1900s.

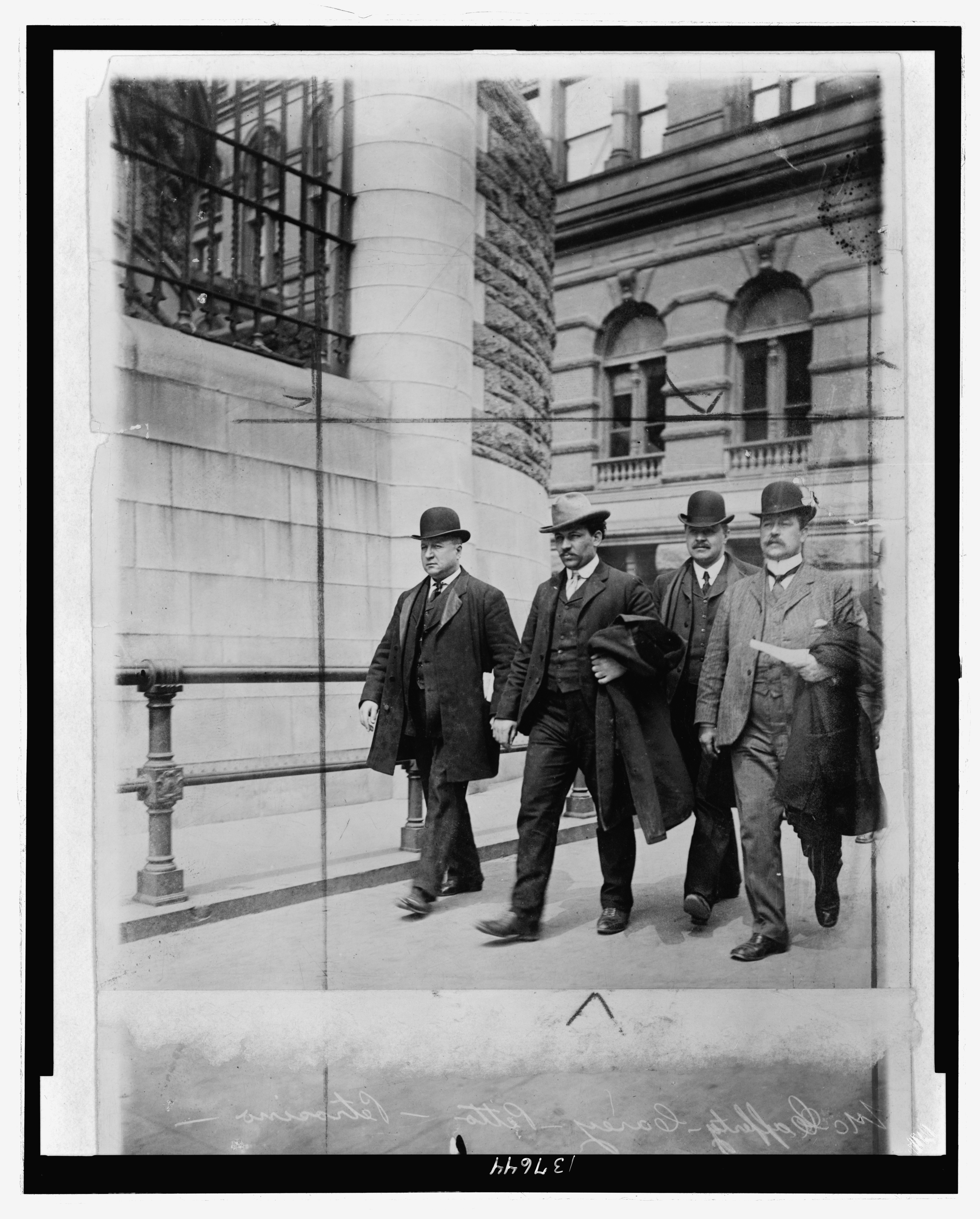
Detective Lt. Joseph Petrosino (left), Inspector Carey and Inspector McCafferty escorting Mafia hitman Petto "the Ox" (Tomasso Petto, second from left)

== Early life ==
Born around 1879, Petto lived in the Williamsburg section of Brooklyn. His nickname "The Ox" came from his massive head and frame. Petto's nominal profession was that of a suit presser, but his real job was working for the Morello family. The Morello family was a Sicilian clan based in Manhattan that became infamous for killing their rivals, stuffing them in barrels and leaving them on street corners.

== Life as a criminal and fugitive ==
On April 15, 1903, after a violent fight with New York Police Department (NYPD) detectives, Petto was arrested for the murder of Benedetto Madonia, one of the Barrel Murders. The police found a pawn ticket belonging to Madonia in Petto's possession. Petto was arraigned and held at the New York City Central Jail, known as "the Tombs", pending an inquest. However, jail officials released Petto by mistake and he disappeared from New York. Petto eventually resurfaced in Pennsylvania, where he became involved in criminal activities with a Black Hand gang in the Scranton, Pennsylvania. In August 1904, a witness implicated Petto in the kidnapping of Vito Laduca, a Morello gang member, but no charges were ever filed.

== Death ==
On the evening of October 21, 1905, Tomasso Petto, living under the alias "Luciano Parrino," was on his way home from his butcher shop when he was shot to death in the village of Browntown, near Pittston and Wilkes-Barre, Pennsylvania. The body was described in the press as "fairly riddled with bullets." Within a day or so, police were able to determine that "Parrino" was none other than Tomasso Petto. At the time, it was speculated that the murderer was Giuseppe de Primo, Madonia's brother-in-law. De Primo was a New York grocer who had helped the Morello gang distribute counterfeit money. Serving a prison sentence when Madonia was murdered, De Primo was later released and allegedly tracked down Petto and killed him. However, no arrests were made and Petto's murderer was never found.

== See also ==
- List of unsolved murders (1900–1979)
