= Joseph Petrosino =

Italian-born American police officer (1860–1909)

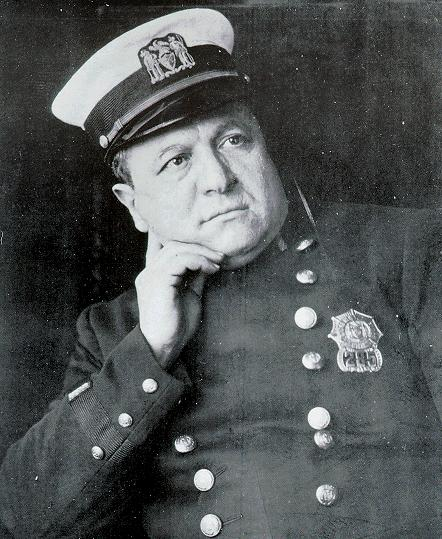
- Petrosino in the 1900s
- Born: Giuseppe Petrosino; August 30, 1860; Padula, Campania, Kingdom of the Two Sicilies
- Died: March 12, 1909 (aged 48); Palermo, Sicily, Kingdom of Italy
- Cause of death: Gunshots
- Resting place: Calvary Cemetery, New York City
- Citizenship: American
- Height: 5 ft 3 in (1.60 m)
- Spouse: Adelina Saulino
- Children: Adelina Petrosino Burke
- Parents: Prospero Petrosino (father); Maria Giuseppa Arato (mother)
- Relatives: Nino Melito Petrosino (grandnephew, descendants, based in Italy)
- Website: https://petrosinousa.org/
- Police career
- Department: New York Police Department
- Service years: 1883–1909
- Rank: Lieutenant
- Badge no.: 285

Joseph Petrosino (born Giuseppe Petrosino, Italian: [dʒuˈzɛppe petroˈziːno; -ˈsiːno]; August 30, 1860 – March 12, 1909) was an Italian-born New York City Police Department (NYPD) officer who was a pioneer in the fight against organized crime. Crime fighting techniques that Petrosino pioneered are still practiced by law enforcement agencies.

== Early years and family ==
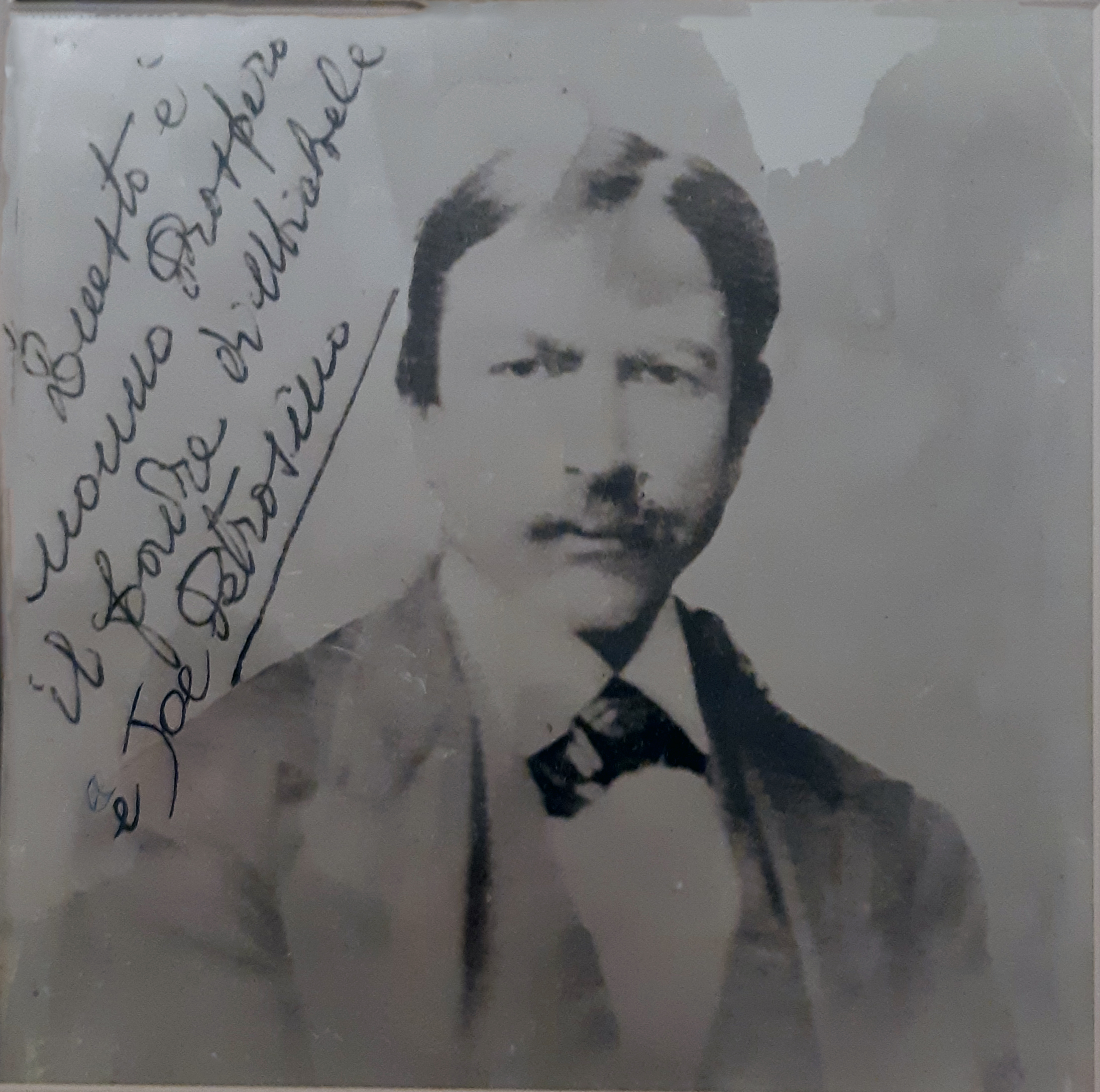
Prospero Petrosino, Petrosino's father)

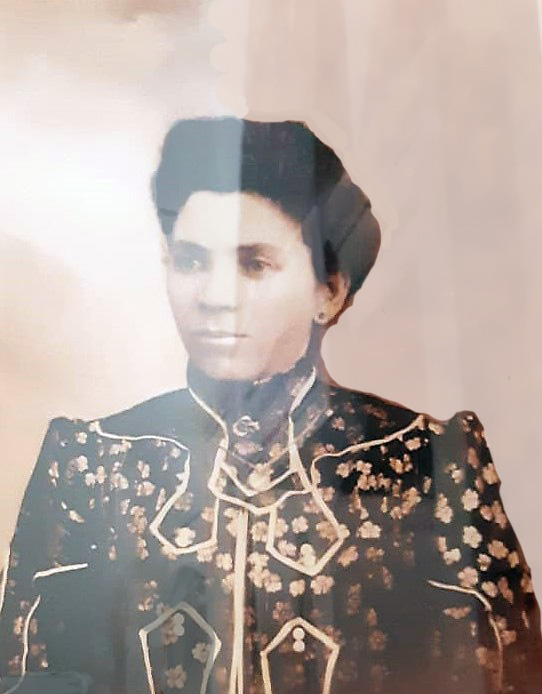
Maria Giuseppa Arato, his mother

Petrosino was born in Padula, a comune in the province of Salerno, in the southern Italian region of Campania. Young Giuseppe was sent with his cousin, Antonio Puppolo, to live with his grandfather in New York City. A streetcar accident took the life of his grandfather, and the two young cousins wound up in orphans/surrogates court. Rather than send the children to the orphanage, the judge took them home to his own family, and provided for the boys until relatives in Italy could be contacted and arrangements made to bring over family members. Petrosino and his cousin Anthony Puppolo lived with a "politically connected" Irish household for some time, which opened up educational and employment avenues not available to more recent immigrants, especially Italian ones.

In 1874, the remainder of the Petrosino family immigrated to the United States. Petrosino married the widow Adelina Saulino (1869–1957) on January 6, 1908, with whom he had a daughter, Adelina Petrosino Burke (1908–2004), who gave birth to Susan Burke. Burke represented the Petrosino family at functions honoring the fallen NYPD hero.

== Career ==
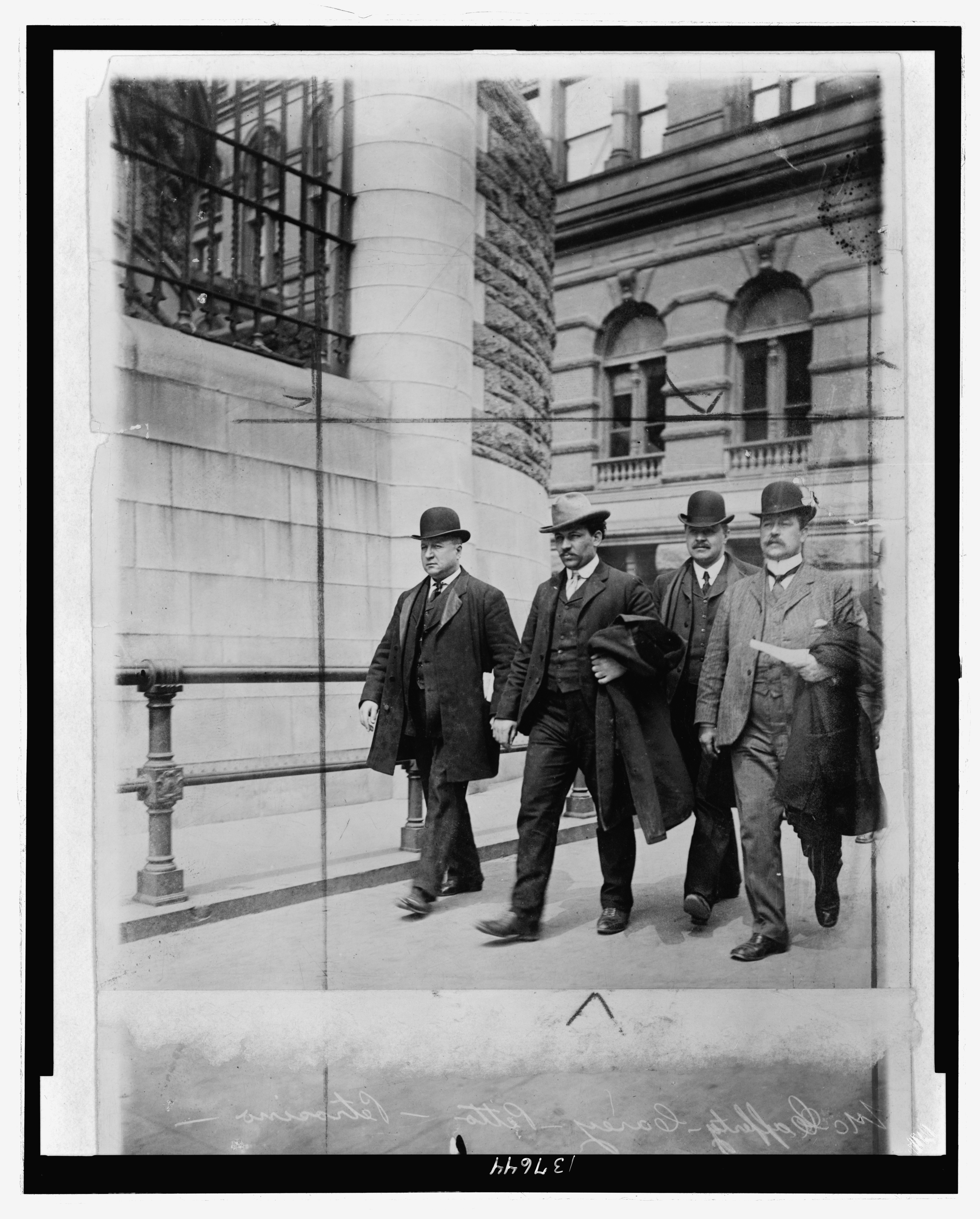
Petrosino (left), Inspector Carey and Inspector McCafferty escorting Mafia hitman Petto the Ox (Tomaso Petto, second from left)

On October 19, 1883, Petrosino joined the NYPD. He was the first Italian language speaker in the NYPD's history. At 5 feet 3 inches (1.60 m), he had to get a waiver of the department's minimum height requirement. He became friends with Theodore Roosevelt, who was a member of the council of police commissioners which governed the NYPD. Fluent in several Italian dialects, Petrosino was able to "make" cases that other officers could not. His ability to solve crimes in the Italian community was such that whenever a serious crime took place in that area, his superiors would call out, "Send for the Dago!"

On July 20, 1895, Roosevelt promoted him to detective sergeant in charge of the department's Homicide Division. The pinnacle of his career came in December 1908 when he was promoted to lieutenant and placed in charge of the Italian Squad, an elite corps of Italian-American detectives assembled specifically to deal with the criminal activities of organizations like the Mafia, which Petrosino saw as a shame upon decent Italians and Italian Americans.

=== Black Hand and Enrico Caruso ===
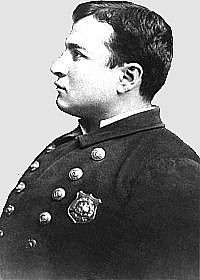
Petrosino in uniform showing his NYPD badge No. 285

One notable case in Petrosino's stint with the Italian Squad involved the Italian tenor Enrico Caruso, who was performing at the Metropolitan Opera House in New York City. He was being extorted by Black Hand gangsters who demanded money in exchange for his life. It was Petrosino, a lover of opera, who convinced Caruso to help him catch those behind the extortion.

=== Assassination of William McKinley ===
An earlier notable case in Petrosino's stint with the Italian Squad was his infiltration of an Italian-based anarchist organization suspected of ties to the assassination of King Umberto I in 1900. During his mission, he discovered evidence that the organization intended to assassinate President William McKinley during his trip to Buffalo, New York.

McKinley was assassinated by Polish-American Leon Czolgosz during his visit to Buffalo's Pan-American Exposition on September 6, 1901. Petrosino had warned the Secret Service, but McKinley ignored the warning, even after Roosevelt, who had by this time become Vice President of the United States, vouched for Petrosino's abilities.

=== Arrest of Cascio Ferro ===
Petrosino's investigations into Mafia activities led him to Vito Cascio Ferro, then a low-ranking Black Hand affiliate. In 1903, Petrosino arrested him on suspicion of murder, but Cascio Ferro was acquitted. Ferro later returned to Sicily, where he ascended to the top rank of the Sicilian Mafia. Cascio Ferro was later suspected of Petrosino's murder. Petrosino also investigated the infamous "barrel murders" case of 1903.

== Assassination ==
In 1909, Petrosino made plans to travel to Palermo, Sicily, on a secret mission. A recently passed federal law allowed the U.S. government to deport any alien who had lived in the country for less than three years if that alien had been convicted of a crime in another country. Petrosino was armed with a long list of known Italian criminals who had taken up residence in the United States, and intended to get enough evidence of their criminal pasts to throw them out of the country once and for all. The secrecy and success of the mission were already in jeopardy. A few weeks before Petrosino's departure, The New York Times asked police commissioner Theodore A. Bingham of Petrosino's whereabouts. Bingham cryptically replied, "Why, he may be on the ocean bound for Europe, for all I know." In the same news article, The Times cited another unnamed source who hinted at the purpose of Petrosino's mission. Furthermore, the U.S. Ambassador to Italy, Lloyd Carpenter Griscom warned Petrosino that he would be recognized in Sicily by "perhaps a thousand criminals".

After his arrival in Rome, Petrosino told a friend that he was being followed, and that he recognized the man who was following him. He said that the man was from New York, and told his friend that he saw the man duck into a telegraph office. He also told his friend that it was likely that the man had alerted his Black Hand Society compatriots in Noto, Sicily, that he (Petrosino) was now in Italy. On March 12, 1909, after arriving in Palermo, Sicily, Petrosino was invited to a nighttime rendezvous in the city's Piazza Marina, where he was to receive information about the Mafia. While waiting for his "informant", Petrosino was shot in the face by two assailants. Reportedly, Petrosino fired off one shot in the direction of the assailants before he fell to the ground. An Italian sailor heard the shots and rushed to Petrosino's aid, but it was too late to help him and he died.

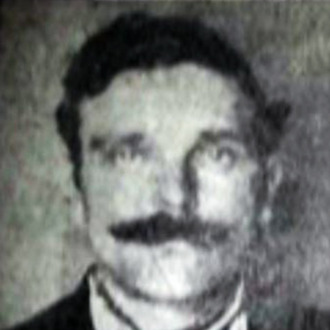
Paolo Palazzotto, Petrosino's alleged killer

The day after Petrosino's death, the detective's Italian Branch received an anonymous letter stating that the New York Black Hand had arranged the murder. The letter named members of the Morello crime family: Giuseppe Morello, Vincenzo Terranova, Ciro Terranova, Giuseppe Fontana, Ignazio Milone, and Pietro Inzarillo. Cascio Ferro worked with these men during his three-year tenure in New York, so their involvement is possible, but it is also possible that the letter was a hoax. Cascio Ferro was arrested for Petrosino's murder, but was released after an associate provided an alibi. Allegedly, he later (when convicted for murder) claimed that he personally killed once "a gallant man, not an enemy". Palermo's police commissioner, Baldassare Ceola, listed five Sicilian suspects:

- Pasquale Enea, linked to the Black Hand in New York
- Giuseppe Fontana, previously involved with a murder in Sicily and Black Hand activities in New York
- Gioacchino Lima, previously charged with a murder, brother-in-law to Morello
- Ignazio Milone, worked with Fontana in New York
- Giovanni Pecoraro, links to Sicilian and New York crime, and Cascio Ferro

Enrico Alfano had been linked to Petrosino's murder, when he began to run a gambling den in the basement of 108 Mulberry Street; Alfano became one of the primary underworld targets of Petrosino who believed he was a big player in the New York branch of the Camorra. On 17 April 1907, Petrosino and his agents raided the apartment at 108 Mulberry Street where Alfano was living and arrested him. The arrest caused a sensation in Naples.

Lieutenant Antonio Vachris, the head of the Italian Detective Bureau in Brooklyn, stated that Petrosino was supposed to have been accompanied by police detectives in Palermo. He suspected that Petrosino was betrayed by someone within the Palermo police department and ultimately lured to his death. "He knew, as I do," Vachris told The New York Times, "that Palermo is the worst hole in Southern Italy for the Mafia. In that city there are at least 100 criminals of the most desperate class who knew Petrosino. Because of his work many of them had been deported from this country, and he was a marked man with them." Author and historian Mike Dash identified the most likely assassins as Carlo Costantino and Antonio Passananti. Costantino and Passananti died in the late 1930s and in March 1969, respectively. In 2014, during an (unrelated) investigation by Italian police, a descendant claimed that Paolo Palazzotto, a henchman of the Fontana crime ring of Palermo, was the actual killer, executing Cascio Ferro's "hit." Palazzotto's name had come up during the investigations in 1909, but he was released after questioning and providing an alibi.

=== Reactions ===
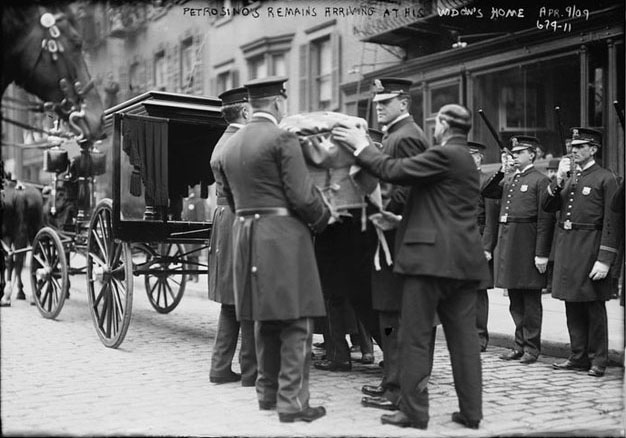
Petrosino's funeral in New York, April 1909

The United States Consul in Palermo, W. H. Bishop, sent a cablegram to NYC Police Commissioner Theodore A. Bingham, informing him of the tragic news and stating that Petrosino "dies a martyr". Bishop told The New York Times that May that it was misreported that Petrosino was armed when he was murdered; he indicated he spoke to him frequently when he was in Palermo and the night of his murder Petrosino left his revolver in his hotel room and refused a police escort. Upon hearing the news of his death from reporters, Theodore Roosevelt was taken aback and said "Petrosino was a great man and a good man. I knew him for years, and he did not know the name of fear."

Assistant District Attorney Francis L. Carrao of Brooklyn was also quoted in The New York Times: "The Italian Government must be held largely responsible for the death of Lieut. Petrosino…The importance of Lieut. Petrosino's mission should have made clear to the Italian Consul General in New York the wisdom of notifying the Italian Minister of the Interior of his coming, that he might be insured the protection of the Government." Il Telegrafo: The Evening Telegraph, an Italian American newspaper in New York, printed an editorial on March 13, 1909, in response to Petrosino's assassination, which said in part: "The assassination of Petrosino is an evil day for the Italians of America, and none of us can any longer deny that there is a Black Hand Society in the United States."

=== Funeral ===
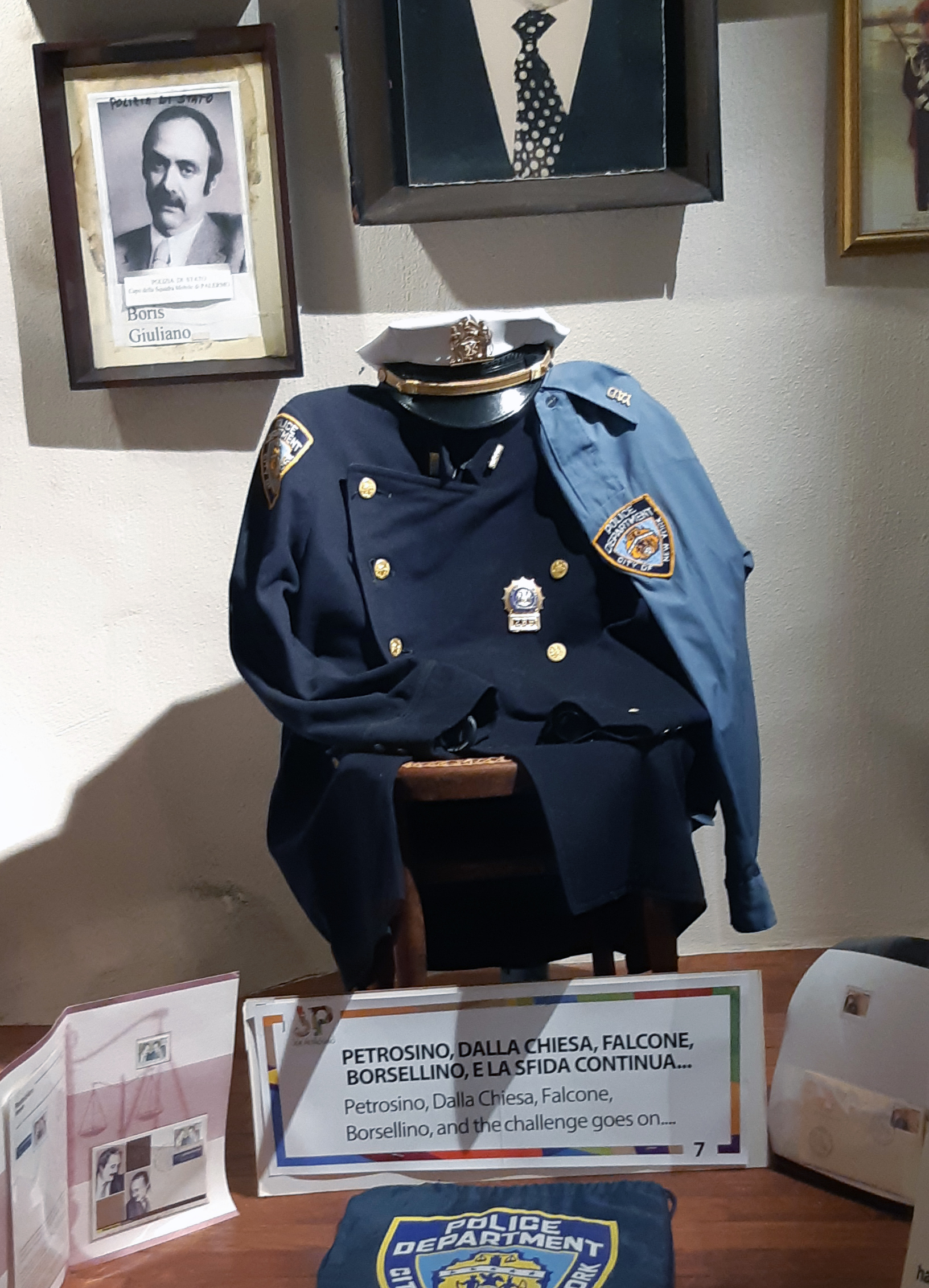
Petrosino's uniform at Joe Petrosino's House & Museum in Padula

Funeral rites for Petrosino were performed in Palermo, after which his body was sent to New York aboard the English S/S Slavonia, arriving April 9. On April 12, 1909, funeral rites were conducted in St. Patrick's Cathedral, with over 200,000 people taking part in the funeral procession. New York City declared the day of his burial a holiday to allow its citizens to pay their respects. A pillar topped with an elaborate bust inaugurated a year after his death, marks his gravesite in Queens, New York, Calvary Cemetery. Multiple organized crime notables are buried there, including members of the Morello crime family which he investigated, (e.g., Giuseppe "Peter" Morello (the Clutch Hand), Ignazio "Lupo the Wolf" Lupo (1877–1947), and the Terranova brothers (who rest in bare graves).

=== Aftermath ===
In May 1909 in Palermo, US Consul Bishop received death threats that he would meet the same fate as Petrosino if he continued to work with Italian authorities in the search for Petrosino's murderers. On July 17, 1909, Baldassare Ceola was relieved of his position as the police commissioner of Palermo. Petrosino's widow, who was born in 1869, died in 1957.

== Legacy ==
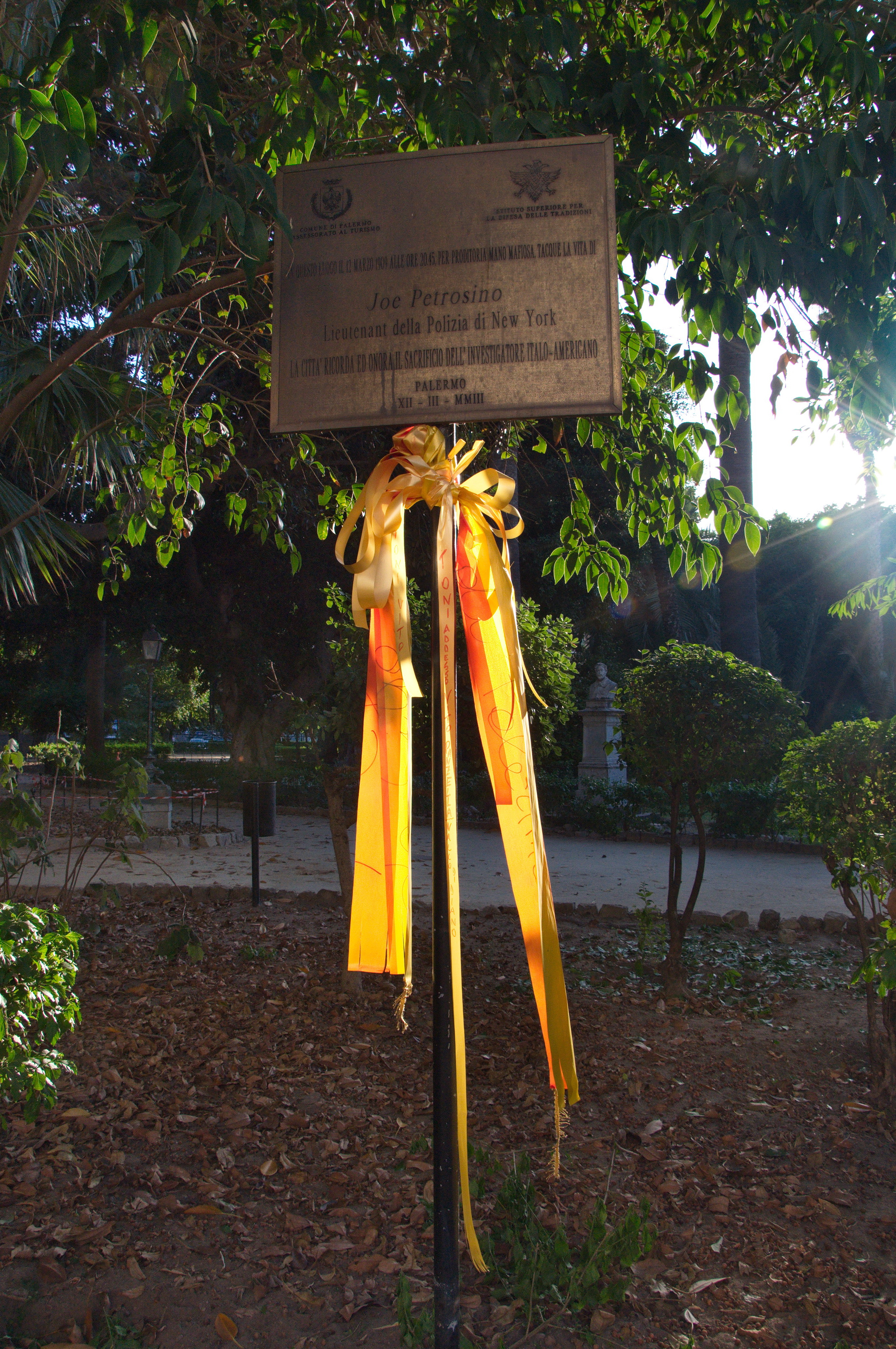
Small memorial, Piazza Marina, Palermo

In 1987, the name of a small triangular park in lower Manhattan was changed from Kenmare Square to Lieutenant Joseph Petrosino Square in his honor. It is bounded by Cleveland Place and Lafayette and Kenmare streets, two blocks north of the old police headquarters at 240 Centre Street at the juncture of the Little Italy, Nolita, and SoHo neighborhoods.

There is an exhibit dedicated to Petrosino in the Italian American Museum, at 155 Mulberry Street in Manhattan's Little Italy. The exhibit pays tribute to him by displaying memorabilia documenting his career. It includes photographs, a vintage LP record, an original Black Hand letter, as well as both artwork and a comic book about his life. A plaster cast from the original 2014 bronze relief in Petrosino Square was donated to the museum by its creator, artist Carter Jones. On March 12, 2003, a small memorial (an engraved brass plate on a pole) was erected on Piazza Marina, Palermo in Petrosino's remembrance.

The Joe Petrosino Prize for Investigative Reporting (in Italian: Certosa di Padula Joe Petrosino Prize) was named in his honor. In 2010, the Italian Post released a postage stamp to commemorate his 150th birthday.The stamp features Petrosino's picture with the Statue of Liberty and the Brooklyn Bridge in the background.

== In popular culture ==
=== In film ===
Four biographical films have been made of Petrosino's life, including: Sidney M. Goldin's The Adventures of Lieutenant Petrosino (1912); Joe Petrosino (1934); Pay or Die (1960), starring Ernest Borgnine; and The Black Hand (1973), starring Lionel Stander. The character of Lieutenant Louis Lorelli (J. Carrol Naish) in The Black Hand (1950), starring Gene Kelly, is modeled on Petrosino.

=== In literature ===
In the peak of his prominence, Petrosino was immortalized in a series of dime novels in Italy titled Giuseppe Petrosino, il Sherlock Holmes d'Italia (Giuseppe Petrosino, the Italian Sherlock Holmes), portraying him as a crusading master detective in the style of Sherlock Holmes and Nick Carter. There were dime novels published in Germany Josef Petrosino, der Schrecken der Schwarzen Hand (Josef Petrosino, the Terror of the Black Hand) 1910-1911 and France. He was also the hero of a comic strip series published in the Italian title, L’Avventuroso. British novelist Frederick Nolan has written two novels based on Petrosino's career with the NYPD. The first was No Place to Be a Cop (1974), while the second was Kill Petrosino! (1975).

Petrosino appears in Laurie Fabiano's novel Elizabeth Street (2010). The January/February 2010 issue of Playboy published the article "Petrosino vs. The Black Hand", written by novelist/screenwriter James Dalessandro. In My Ears Are Bent, Joseph Mitchell's collection of his feature articles from the 1930s, Petrosino appears as "Louis Sittenberg, the famous New York detective who was killed on a trip to Italy to bring back a Black Hand agent." Whether Mitchell's informant was confused or Mitchell changed Petrosino's name for some reason is not known. In 2017, American journalist Stephan Talty wrote The Black Hand, a history of Petrosino's life and career. In 2020, American author Victoria Thompson used Petrosino as one of the characters in her novel Murder on Pleasant Avenue.

=== In television ===
Petrosino's story is discussed in the two-hour History Channel program Godfathers, which features commentary by Mario Cuomo, former governor of New York, and Bernard Kerik, former police commissioner of New York City. He has also been the subject of two Italian television dramas. He was portrayed in Petrosino (miniseries, 1972, directed by Daniele D'Anza) by Adolfo Celi and in Joe Petrosino (TV movie, 2006) by Giuseppe Fiorello.

== See also ==
- List of victims of the Sicilian Mafia

New York City Police Department
| Preceded by N/A | NYPD's Italian Squad c. 1905–1909 | Succeeded by Michael Fiaschetti |
