= Edward Croker =

Irish rugby union player

- Full name: Edward William Dunlo Croker
- Born: 14 September 1849 Dublin, Ireland
- Died: 10 May 1893 (aged 43) Chicago, Illinois, United States

Rugby union career
- Position: Forward
International career
Years	Team	Apps	(Points)
1878	Ireland	1	(0)

Edward William Dunlo Croker (14 September 1849 — 10 May 1893) was an Irish international rugby union player.

Born in Dublin, Croker was the great-grandson of William Trench, 1st Earl of Clancarty, and grandson of Henry Monck, 1st Earl of Rathdowne. He gained an Ireland cap in 1878, as a forward against England at Lansdowne Road. While in Chicago in 1893 to attend the World's Fair, Croker suffered fatal injuries when he fell from a horse.

== See also ==
- List of Ireland national rugby union players
