= Barrel murder =

Gangland warfare tactic

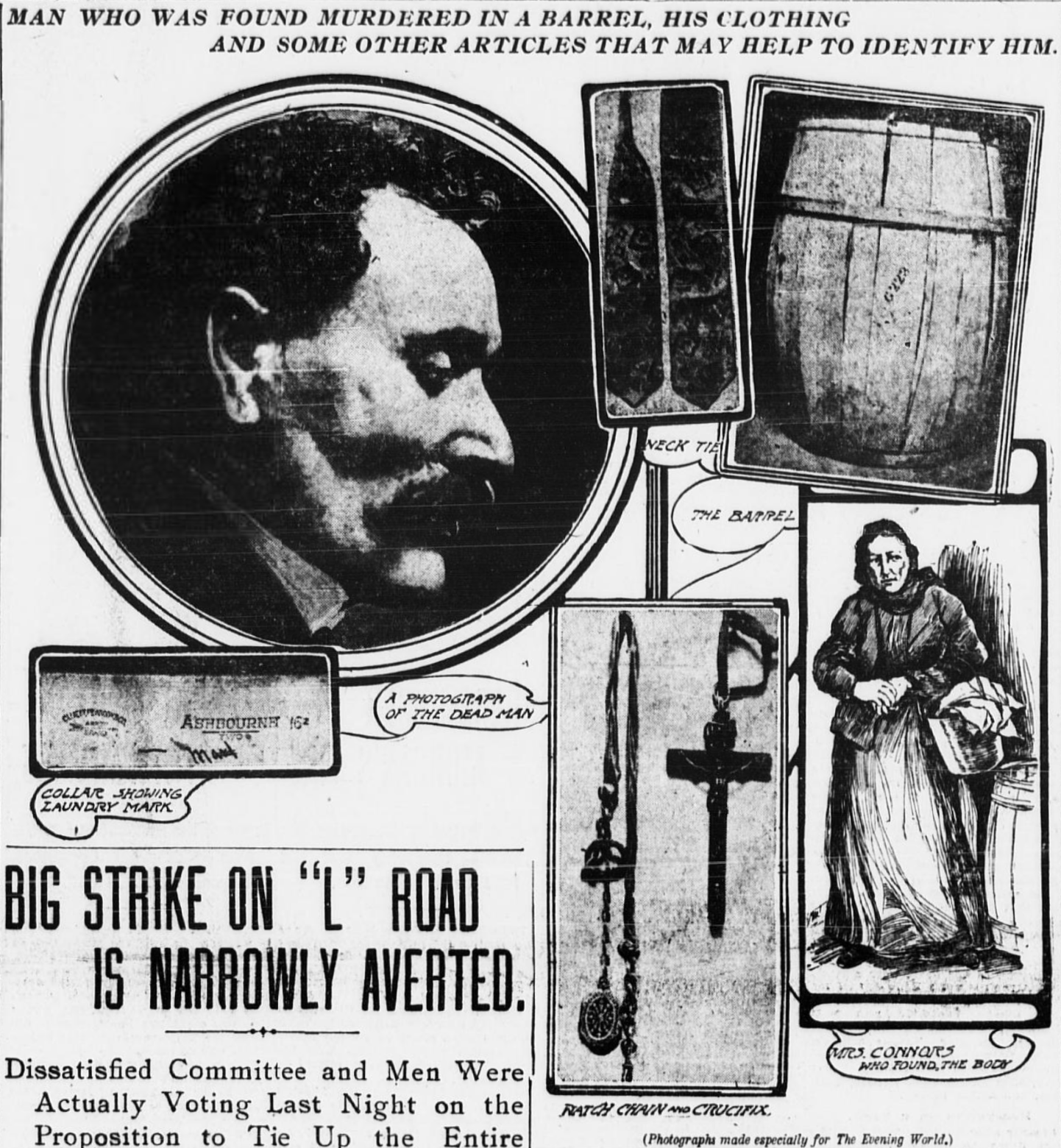
Report about Benedetto Madonia murder in New York, committed by Morello crime family members (The Evening World, 14 April 1903)

A barrel murder was a method for disposing of the bodies of people killed by early American mafiosi since the 1870s, although the earliest recorded barrel murders in New York were reported in 1895 and 1900.

The victims, usually Italian immigrants, would be found stuffed inside a barrel after being shot, stabbed, or strangled to death, and left on a random street corner or back alley, or shipped to a nonexistent address in another city. First used by the Sicilian Provenzano crime family in New Orleans and the Morello crime family in New York City, the barrel murders eventually alerted authorities to the existence of the Mafia, leading to the later investigation by New Orleans police chief David C. Hennessy, whose own eventual assassination was attributed to Sicilian mafiosi in 1890, resulting in one of the largest mass lynchings in U.S. history. New York detective Joseph Petrosino's early investigations into the New York barrel murders would lead to a crackdown against the Black Hand and the Morellos until his assassination in 1909. The Morellos, suspected of over 100 murders, continued to use the barrel murder for over thirty years until eventually ceasing after the (now well-publicized) murders resulted in unwanted attention from local authorities. Other non-Italian criminals used the same method to draw police suspicion away from themselves onto the Morellos and other Italian mafiosi.

== Recent use ==
The method was later used in Johnny Roselli's death when he was found in a 55-gallon oil drum off the coast of Florida in 1976. It is generally believed Roselli was murdered in revenge for his skimming profits from Las Vegas casinos, but given Roselli's involvement with CIA plots against Fidel Castro in Cuba, others have suggested that Roselli's death was not at the hands of fellow mobsters but that the killers used the barrel method to cast suspicion towards the Mafia.
