= Lucky Luciano =

Italian American mobster (1897–1962)

Charles "Lucky" Luciano
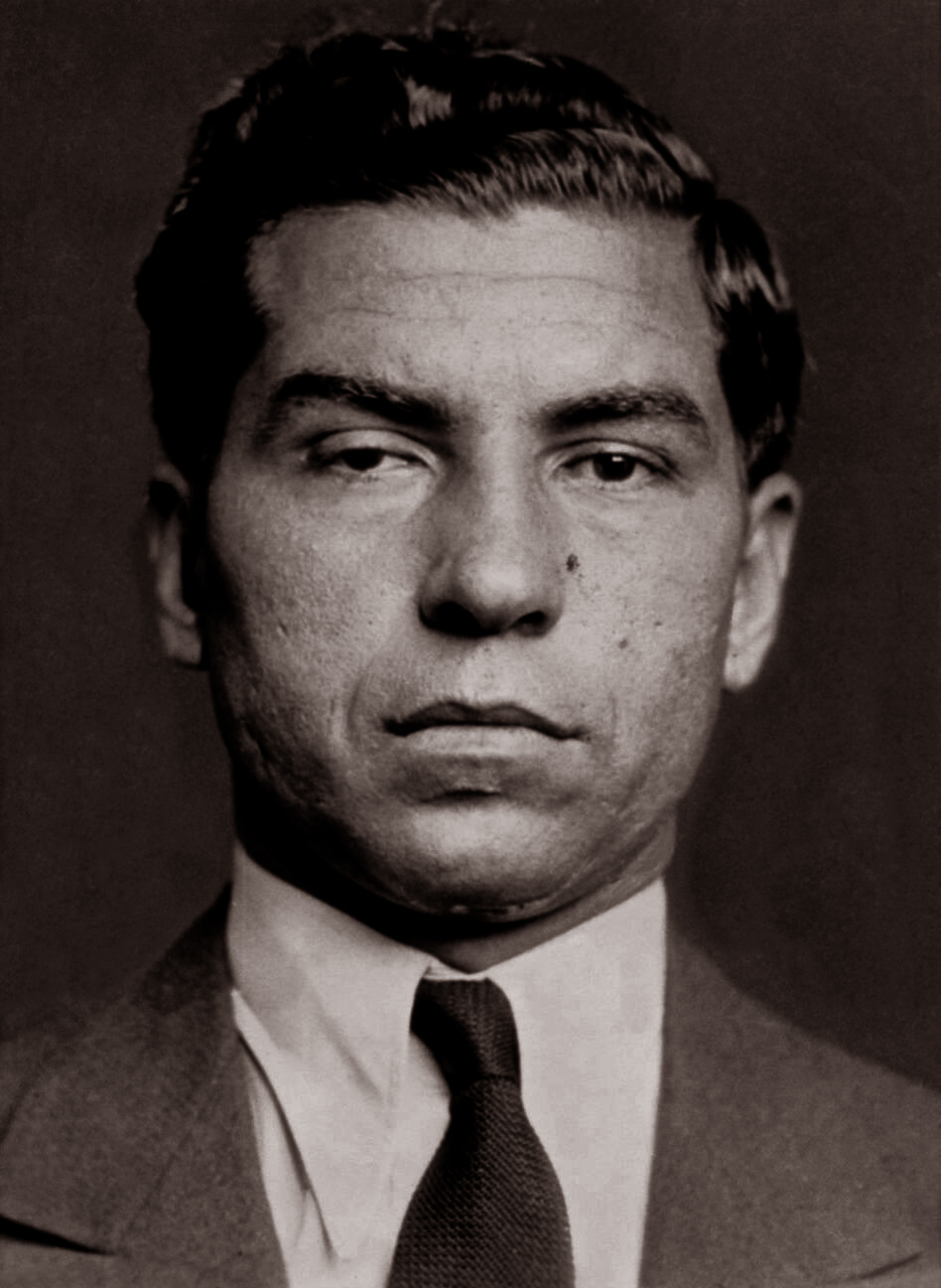
- 1936 mugshot of Luciano
- Born: Salvatore Lucania; November 24, 1897 (Note: November 24, 1897, is the birth date most commonly used, however, November 11, 1897, is a birth date that has also been cited.); Lercara Friddi, Sicily, Italy
- Died: January 26, 1962 (aged 64); Naples, Campania, Italy
- Resting place: St. John Cemetery, Queens, New York, U.S.
- Other names: "Lucky" "Charlie Lucky"; Charles Ross
- Known for: First head of the modern Genovese crime family, establishing the Commission, head of the modern American Mafia and the first and only head of the National Crime Syndicate
- Predecessor: Giuseppe Masseria
- Successor: Frank Costello
- Allegiance: Five Points Gang; Luciano crime family National Crime Syndicate
- Criminal charge: Forced prostitution
- Penalty: 30 to 50 years' imprisonment (1936)
- Accomplices: Gay Orlova (1929–1936); Igea Lissoni (1948–1959; possibly married 1949)

Charles "Lucky" Luciano (/ˌluːtʃiˈɑːnoʊ/ LOO-chee-AH-noh; Italian: [luˈtʃaːno]; born Salvatore Lucania [salvaˈtoːre lukaˈniːa]; November 24, 1897 – January 26, 1962) was an Italian mafioso who operated mainly in the United States. He started his criminal career in New York City's Five Points Gang and was instrumental in the development of the National Crime Syndicate. Luciano is considered the father of the Italian-American Mafia for the establishment of the Commission in 1931, after he abolished the capo dei capi (boss of bosses) title held by Salvatore Maranzano following the Castellammarese War. He was also the first official boss of the modern Genovese crime family.

In 1936, Luciano was tried and convicted for compulsory prostitution and running a prostitution racket after years of investigation by District Attorney Thomas E. Dewey. Although he was sentenced to thirty to fifty years in prison, an agreement was struck with the United States Department of the Navy through his Jewish Mob associate, Meyer Lansky, to provide naval intelligence during World War II. In 1946, for his alleged wartime cooperation, Luciano's sentence was commuted on the condition that he be deported to Italy. Luciano died in Italy on January 26, 1962, and his body was permitted to be transported back to the U.S. for burial.

== Early life ==
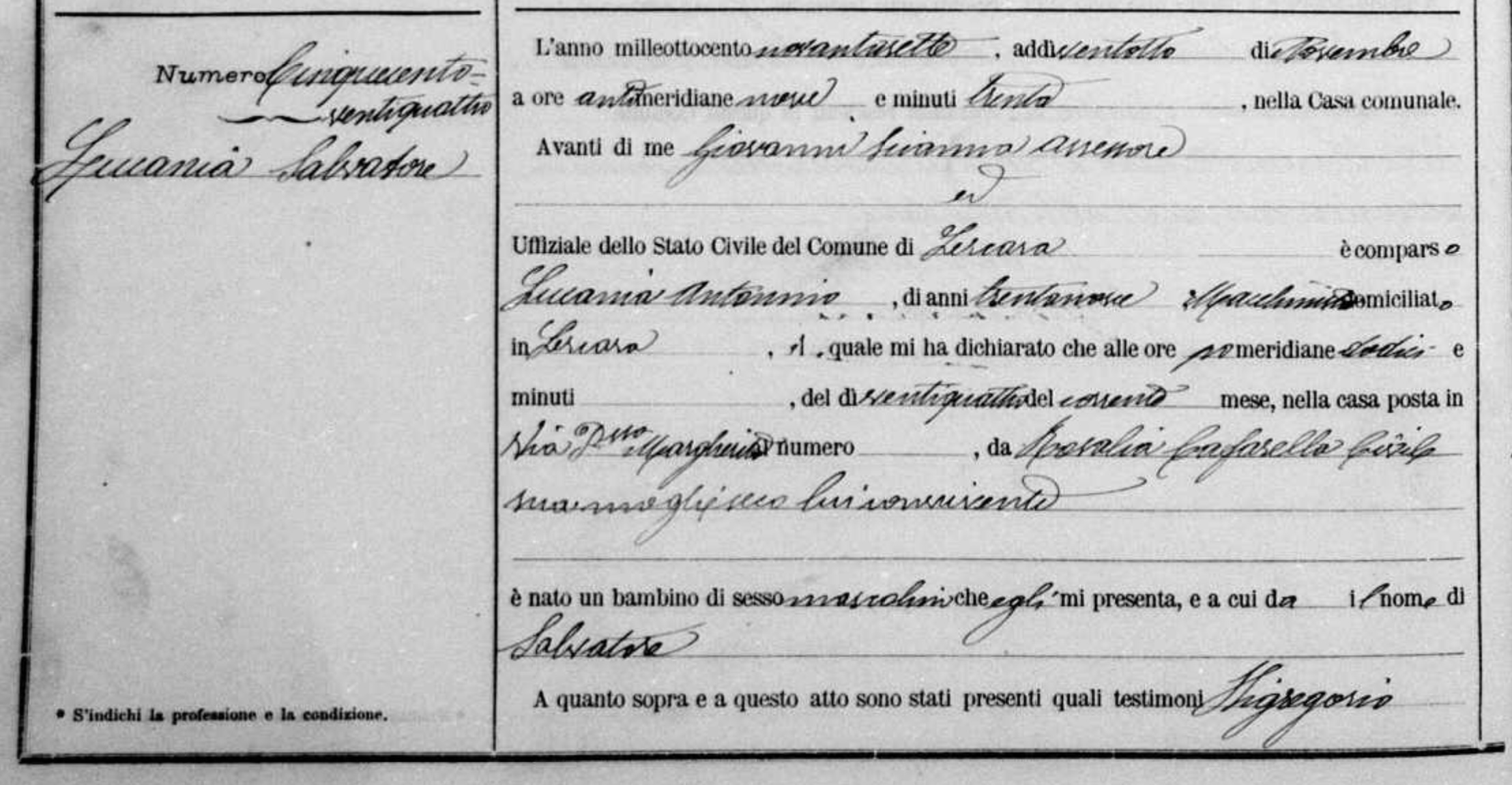
Birth certificate of Luciano

Charles "Lucky" Luciano was born Salvatore Lucania on November 24, 1897, in Lercara Friddi, Sicily, Italy. His parents, Antonio Lucania and Rosalia Caffarella, had four other children: Giuseppe (born 1885); Bartolomeo (born 1890); Filippa, or "Fanny" (born 1901); and Concetta (born 1903).

Luciano's father, who worked in a sulfur mine, was very ambitious and persistent in eventually moving to the United States. In The Last Testament of Lucky Luciano: The Mafia Story in His Own Words, a purported semi-autobiography published after his death, Luciano described how his father always purchased a new Palermo-based steamship company calendar each year and would save money for the boat trip by keeping a jar under his bed. He also mentions in the book that his father was too proud to ask for money, so instead his mother was given money in secret by Luciano's cousin, Rotolo, who also lived in Lercara Friddi. Although the book has largely been regarded as accurate, there are numerous problems that point to the possibility that it is in fact fraudulent. The book was based on conversations that Luciano supposedly had with Hollywood producer Martin Gosch in the years before Luciano's death. As The New York Times reported shortly before the book's publication, the book quotes Luciano talking about events that occurred years after his death, repeats errors from previously published books on the American Mafia and describes Luciano's participation in meetings that occurred when he was in jail.

In 1906, when Luciano was eight years old, his family emigrated to the U.S. They settled in New York City, in the borough of Manhattan on its Lower East Side, specifically East Village, Manhattan. The Lower East Side was a popular destination for Italian immigrants during the period. At age 14, Luciano dropped out of school and started a job delivering hats, earning $7 per week. After winning $244 in a dice game, Luciano quit his job and began earning money on the street. That same year, his parents sent him to the Brooklyn Truancy School.

As a teenager, Luciano started his own gang and became a member of the old Five Points Gang in Lower Manhattan. Unlike other street gangs, who were focused on petty crime, Luciano offered protection to Jewish youngsters from Italian and Irish gangs for ten cents per week. Luciano met Meyer Lansky as a teenager when Luciano attempted to extort Lansky for protection money on his walk home from school. Luciano respected the younger boy's defiant responses to his threats, and the two formed a lasting partnership.

It is not clear how Luciano earned the nickname "Lucky". It may have come from surviving a severe beating and throat-slashing by three men in 1929 as the result of his refusal to work for another crime boss. The nickname may also be attributed to his luck at gambling, or to a simple mispronunciation of his last name. It is also not clear how his surname came to be rendered "Luciano", and this too may have been the result of persistent misspellings by newspapers. From 1916 to 1936, Luciano was arrested twenty-five times on charges including assault, illegal gambling, blackmail and robbery but spent no time in prison.

== Prohibition and the early 1920s ==
On January 17, 1920, the Eighteenth Amendment to the United States Constitution took effect and Prohibition was enforced for the next thirteen years. The amendment prohibited the manufacture, sale and transportation of alcoholic beverages. Since the demand for alcohol continued, the resulting black market for alcoholic beverages provided criminals with an additional source of income. By 1920, Luciano had met many future Mafia leaders, including Vito Genovese and Frank Costello, the latter a longtime friend and future business partner, through the Five Points Gang. That same year, Lower Manhattan crime boss Joe Masseria recruited Luciano as one of his gunmen. Around that same time, Luciano and his close associates started working for gambler Arnold Rothstein, who immediately saw the potential financial windfall from Prohibition and educated Luciano on running bootleg alcohol as a business. Luciano, Costello and Genovese started their own bootlegging operation with financing from Rothstein.

Rothstein served as a mentor for Luciano; among other things, he taught how to move in high society and to dress stylishly. Rothstein employed Jack "Legs" Diamond as a bodyguard and an enforcer; Luciano often worked with Diamond. Luciano also started selling heroin smuggled in from Montreal. In 1923 he was caught in a sting selling heroin to undercover agents. Although he saw no jail time, being outed as a drug peddler damaged his reputation among his high-class associates and customers. To save face, Luciano bought 200 expensive seats to the Jack Dempsey–Luis Firpo boxing match in The Bronx and distributed them to top gangsters and politicians. Rothstein took Luciano on a shopping trip to Wanamaker's Department Store in Manhattan to buy expensive clothes for the fight. The strategy worked, and Luciano's reputation was saved. By 1925, Luciano was grossing over $12 million per year, and made a personal income of about $4 million per year from running illegal gambling and bootlegging operations in New York that also extended into Philadelphia. In 1927, he started living at the Barbizon-Plaza hotel; living under the alias Charles Lane, he lived there for a number of years.

== Rise to power and the late 1920s ==
Luciano soon became a top aide in Masseria's criminal organization. In contrast to Rothstein, Masseria was uneducated, with poor manners and limited managerial skills. By the late 1920s, his main rival was Sicilian-born boss Salvatore Maranzano of the Castellammarese clan. After Gaetano Reina, one of Masseria's lieutenants, switched sides to Maranzano, Masseria ordered Luciano to arrange Reina's murder. After the murder took place on February 26, 1930, the rivalry between Masseria and Maranzano escalated into the bloody Castellammarese War. Masseria and Maranzano were "Mustache Petes": older, traditional Mafia bosses who had started their criminal careers in Italy. They believed in upholding the supposed "Old World Mafia" principles of "honor", "tradition", "respect", and "dignity". These bosses refused to work with non-Italians and were skeptical of working with non-Sicilians. Some of the most conservative bosses worked with only those men with roots in their own Sicilian village. In contrast, Luciano was willing to work with not only Italians, but also Jewish and Irish gangsters, as long as there was money to be made. Luciano was shocked to hear traditional Sicilian mafiosi lecture him about his dealings with close friend Costello, whom they called "the dirty Calabrian".

Luciano soon began cultivating ties with other younger mobsters who had been born in Italy but began their criminal careers in the U.S. and chafed at their bosses' conservatism. Luciano wanted to use lessons he learned from Rothstein to turn their gang activities into full-blown criminal enterprises. As the war progressed, this group came to include future mob leaders such as Costello, Genovese, Albert Anastasia, Joe Adonis, Joe Bonanno, Carlo Gambino, Joe Profaci, Tommy Gagliano and Tommy Lucchese. They believed that their bosses' greed and conservatism were keeping them poor while the Irish and Jewish gangs got rich. Luciano's vision was to form a national crime syndicate in which the Italian, Jewish, and Irish gangs could pool their resources and turn organized crime into a lucrative business for all – an organization he founded after a conference was hosted in Atlantic City by Luciano, Lansky, Costello, and Johnny Torrio in May 1929. In October 1929, Luciano was forced into a limousine at gunpoint by three men, beaten and stabbed, and strung up by his hands from a beam in a warehouse in Staten Island. He survived the ordeal, but was forever marked with a scar and droopy eye. The identity of his abductors was never established. When picked up by the police after the assault, Luciano said that he had no idea who did it. In 1953, Luciano told an interviewer that it was the police who kidnapped and beat him in an attempt to find Jack "Legs" Diamond. Another story was that Maranzano ordered the attack.

=== Power play ===
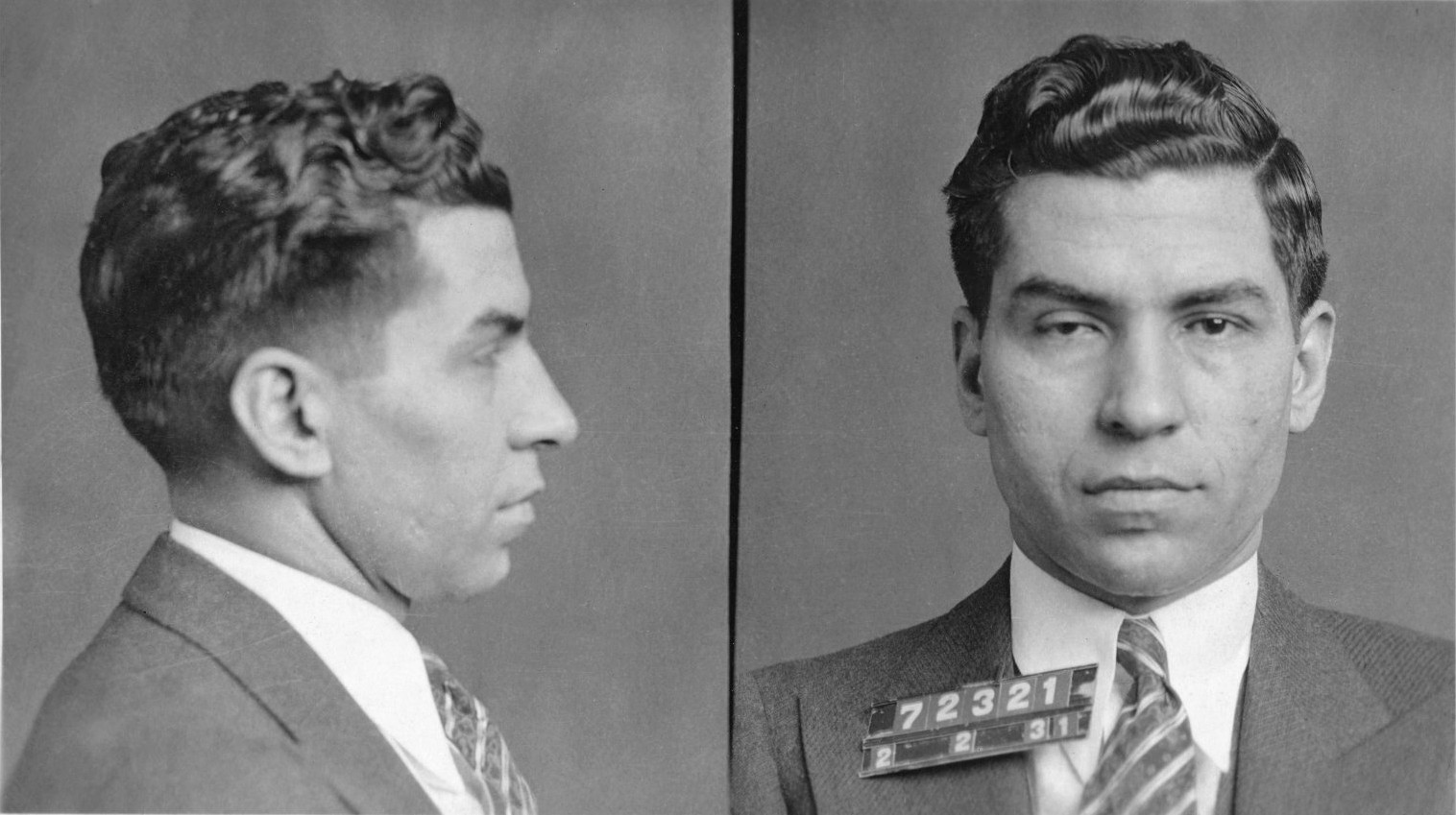
1931 New York Police Department mugshot of Luciano

By early 1931, the Castellammarese War had turned against Masseria, and Luciano saw an opportunity to switch allegiance. In a secret deal with Maranzano, Luciano agreed to engineer Masseria's death in return for receiving his rackets and becoming Maranzano's second-in-command. Adonis had joined the Masseria faction, and when Masseria heard about Luciano's betrayal he approached Adonis about killing Luciano; however, Adonis instead warned Luciano about the murder plot.

On April 15, 1931, Masseria was killed at Nuova Villa Tammaro, a Coney Island restaurant in Brooklyn. While they played cards, Luciano allegedly excused himself to go to the bathroom, at which point gunmen—reportedly Anastasia, Genovese, Adonis and Benjamin "Bugsy" Siegel—entered the restaurant. Ciro Terranova drove the getaway car but legend has it that he was too shaken up to drive and had to be shoved out of the driver's seat by Siegel. With Maranzano's blessing, Luciano took over Masseria's gang and became Maranzano's lieutenant, ending the Castellammarese War.

With Masseria gone, Maranzano reorganized the Italian-American gangs in New York City into Five Families headed by Luciano, Profaci, Gagliano, Vincent Mangano and himself. Maranzano called a meeting of crime bosses in Wappingers Falls, New York, where he declared himself capo di tutti capi ("boss of all bosses"). Maranzano also whittled down the rival families' rackets in favor of his own. Luciano appeared to accept these changes but was merely biding his time before removing Maranzano. Although Maranzano was slightly more forward-thinking than Masseria, Luciano had come to believe that he was even greedier and more hidebound than Masseria had been.

By September 1931, Maranzano realized Luciano was a threat, and hired Vincent Coll, an Irish gangster, to kill him; however, Lucchese alerted Luciano that he was marked for death. On September 10, Maranzano ordered Luciano, Genovese and Costello to come to his office at the Helmsley Building in Manhattan. Convinced that Maranzano planned to murder them, Luciano decided to act first. He sent to Maranzano's office Lucchese and four Jewish gangsters, secured with the aid of Lansky and Siegel, whose faces were unknown to Maranzano's people. Disguised as government agents, two of the gangsters disarmed Maranzano's bodyguards. Lucchese identified Maranzano to the other two gangsters, who proceeded to stab the boss multiple times before shooting him. This assassination was the first of what would later be fabled as the "Night of the Sicilian Vespers".

Several days later, on September 13, the corpses of two Maranzano allies, Samuel Monaco and Louis Russo, were retrieved from Newark Bay, showing evidence of torture. Meanwhile, Joseph Siragusa, leader of the Pittsburgh crime family, was shot to death in his home. The October 15 disappearance of Joe Ardizonne, head of the Los Angeles crime family, would later be regarded as part of this alleged plan to quickly eliminate the Mustache Petes; the idea of an organized mass purge, directed by Luciano, has been debunked as a myth.

== Reorganizing Cosa Nostra and the Commission ==
With the death of Maranzano, Luciano became the dominant crime boss in the U.S. He had reached the pinnacle of the underworld, setting policies and directing activities along with the other Mafia bosses. His own crime family controlled lucrative criminal rackets in New York City such as illegal gambling, extortion, bookmaking, loansharking, and drug trafficking. He became very influential in labor union activities and controlled the Manhattan Waterfront, garbage hauling, construction, Garment District businesses, and trucking. Although there would have been few objections had Luciano declared himself capo di tutti capi, he chose to abolish the title, believing the position created trouble between the families and made himself a target for another ambitious challenger. Instead, Luciano chose to quietly maintain control by forging unofficial alliances with other bosses; at the same time, Luciano did not discard all of Maranzano's changes as he believed that the ceremony of becoming a "made man" in a crime family was a Sicilian anachronism. Genovese ultimately persuaded Luciano to keep the ceremony, arguing that young people needed rituals to promote obedience to the family. Luciano remained committed to omertà, the oath of silence, to protect the families from legal prosecution. In addition, he kept Maranzano's structure of five crime families in New York.

Luciano elevated his most trusted Italian associates to high-level positions in what was now the Luciano crime family. Genovese became underboss and Costello consigliere. Adonis, Michael "Trigger Mike" Coppola, Anthony Strollo, Willie Moretti and Anthony Carfano all served as caporegimes. Because Lansky and Siegel were non-Italians, neither man could hold official positions within any Mafia family; however, Lansky was a top advisor to Luciano and Siegel a trusted associate. Later in 1931, Luciano called a meeting in Chicago with various bosses, where he proposed a Commission to serve as the governing body for organized crime. Designed to settle all disputes and decide which families controlled which territories, the Commission has been called Luciano's greatest innovation. His goals with the Commission were to quietly maintain his own power over all the families, and to prevent future gang wars; the bosses approved the idea of the Commission.

The Commission was originally composed of representatives of the five families of New York, the Buffalo crime family and the Chicago Outfit; later, the crime families of Philadelphia and Detroit were added, with smaller families being formally represented by a Commission family. The Commission also provided representation for Jewish criminal organizations in New York. The group's first test came in 1935, when it ordered Dutch Schultz to drop his plans to murder Special Prosecutor Thomas E. Dewey. Luciano argued that such an assassination would precipitate a massive law enforcement crackdown; the national crime syndicate had enacted a hard and fast rule stating that law enforcement and prosecutors were not to be harmed. An enraged Schultz said he would kill Dewey anyway and walked out of the meeting. Later, Anastasia approached Luciano with information that Schultz had asked him to stake out Dewey's apartment building on Fifth Avenue. Upon hearing the news, the Commission held a discreet meeting to discuss the matter. After six hours of deliberations, the Commission ordered Lepke Buchalter to eliminate Schultz. On October 23, 1935, before he could kill Dewey, Schultz was shot in a tavern in Newark, New Jersey, and succumbed to his injuries the following day.

== Prosecution for pandering ==
During the early 1930s, Luciano's crime family started taking over small-scale prostitution operations in New York City. In June 1935, New York Governor Herbert H. Lehman appointed Dewey, a United States Attorney, as a special prosecutor to combat organized crime in the city. Dewey's assistant district attorney, Eunice Carter, led an investigation that connected Luciano to this prostitution network. Carter began to build a case of prostitution racketeering founded on evidence from interviews with prostitutes and wiretaps.

On February 2, 1936, Dewey authorized a raid on 200 brothels in Manhattan and Brooklyn, earning him nationwide recognition as a major "gangbuster". He took measures to prevent police corruption from impeding the raids: he assigned 160 police officers outside of the New York City Police Department's (NYPD) vice squad to conduct the raids, and the officers were instructed to wait on street corners until they received their orders, minutes before the raids were to begin. Sixteen men and 87 women were arrested; however, unlike previous vice raids the arrestees were not released, but taken to Dewey's offices where Judge Philip J. McCook set minimum bails of US$10,000, far beyond their means to pay. Carter had built trust with a number of the arrested prostitutes and madams, some of whom reported being beaten and abused by mafiosi. She convinced many to testify rather than serve additional jail time. By mid-March, several defendants had implicated Luciano. Three of the prostitutes identified Luciano as the ringleader to whom associates David Betillo and Thomas Pennochio ultimately reported.

In late March 1936, after receiving a tip on his imminent arrest, Luciano fled to Hot Springs, Arkansas. A New York detective in Hot Springs on a different assignment spotted Luciano and notified Dewey. On April 3, Luciano was arrested in Hot Springs on a criminal warrant from New York charging him with 90 counts of compulsory prostitution. Luciano's lawyers in Arkansas began a fierce legal battle against extradition. On April 6, Owney Madden, one-time owner of the Cotton Club, offered a $50,000 bribe to Arkansas Attorney General Carl E. Bailey to facilitate Luciano's case: however, Bailey refused the bribe and immediately reported it. On April 17, after all of Luciano's legal options had been exhausted, Arkansas authorities handed him to three NYPD detectives for transport by train back to New York for trial. When the train reached St. Louis, Missouri, the detectives and Luciano changed trains. During this switchover, they were guarded by 20 local policemen to prevent a mob rescue attempt. The party arrived in New York on April 18, and Luciano was arraigned and jailed the following day after failing to post the US$350,000 bond set by McCook.

On May 11, 1936, Luciano's pandering trial began. Dewey personally prosecuted the case that Carter had begun against Luciano and twelve co-defendants. He accused Luciano of being part of a massive prostitution ring known as "the bonding combination". He also exposed Luciano for lying on the witness stand through direct quizzing and records of telephone calls; Luciano could not explain why his federal income tax records claimed he made only $22,000 a year, while he was obviously a wealthy man. Dewey ruthlessly pressed Luciano on his long arrest record and his relationships with well-known gangsters such as Masseria, Terranova and Buchalter. On June 7, Luciano and his remaining eight co-defendants each were convicted on 62 counts of compulsory prostitution. On June 18, Luciano was sentenced to 30 to 50 years in state prison.

In his book Five Families, longtime New York Times organized-crime columnist Selwyn Raab wrote that a number of scholars have questioned whether Luciano was directly involved in the bonding combination. According to Raab, there was evidence that Luciano profited from prostitution and several members of his family ran a protection racket that ensnared many of New York's madams and brothel keepers; however, he wrote that several Mafia and legal scholars believed that it would have been out of character for a crime boss of Luciano's stature to be directly involved in a prostitution ring. Raab wrote that the evidence Dewey presented against Luciano was "astonishingly thin" and argued that it would have been more appropriate to charge Luciano with extortion. Raab believed that Luciano's defense team, led by attorney George Morton Levy, erred in allowing him to take the stand in his own defense, opening the door for Dewey to attack his credibility on cross-examination.

All four of the prostitutes who directly implicated Luciano in the bonding combination—Nancy Presser, Mildred Harris, Thelma Jordan and Florence "Cokey Flo" Brown—recanted their testimony after the trial, and at least two of Luciano's contemporaries have denied that he was ever part of the combination. In her memoirs, New York society madam Polly Adler wrote that if Luciano had been involved with the combination, she would have known about it. Bonanno, the last surviving contemporary of Luciano's who was not in prison, also denied that Luciano was directly involved in prostitution in his book A Man of Honor. Bonanno believed that several of Luciano's soldiers used his name to intimidate brothel keepers into paying for protection and argued that Dewey built his case "not so much against Luciano as against Luciano's name". Key witnesses at Luciano's trial testified that he was involved with prostitution racketeering and frequently discussed the sex industry business, once describing it as "the same as the A&P stores are, a large syndicate" and "the same as chain stores", and ordering an underling to "[g]o ahead and crack the joint" when a brothel fell behind in its kickbacks. One witness testified that Luciano, working out of his Waldorf-Astoria suite, personally hired him to collect from bookers and madams.

=== Prison ===
Luciano continued to run his crime family from prison, relaying his orders through acting boss Genovese. In 1937 Genovese fled to Naples to avoid an impending murder indictment in New York, so Luciano appointed his consigliere, Costello, as the new acting boss and the overseer of Luciano's interests. Luciano was first imprisoned at Sing Sing Correctional Facility in Ossining, New York. Later in 1936, authorities moved him to Clinton Correctional Facility in Dannemora, a remote facility far away from New York City. At Clinton, Betillo prepared special dishes for Luciano in a kitchen set aside by authorities. Luciano was assigned a job in the prison laundry. Luciano used his influence to help get the materials to build a church at the prison, which became famous for being one of the only freestanding churches in the New York State correctional system and also for the fact that on the church's altar are two of the original doors from the Victoria, the ship of Ferdinand Magellan. Luciano's legal appeals continued until October 10, 1938, when the United States Supreme Court refused to review his case. At this point, Luciano stepped down as family boss and Costello formally replaced him.

== World War II, freedom, and deportation ==
During World War II, the U.S. government struck a secret deal with the imprisoned Luciano. In 1942, the Office of Naval Intelligence was concerned about German and Italian agents entering the country through the New York waterfront. They were also worried about sabotage in these facilities. Knowing that the Mafia controlled the waterfront, the U.S. Department of the Navy contacted Lansky about a deal with Luciano. To facilitate negotiations, Luciano was transferred to Great Meadow Correctional Facility in Comstock, New York, which was much closer to New York City.

The Navy, the State of New York and Luciano reached a deal: in exchange for a commutation of his sentence, Luciano promised the complete assistance of his organization in providing intelligence to the Navy. Anastasia, a Luciano ally who controlled the docks, allegedly promised no dockworker strikes during the war. In preparation for the 1943 allied invasion of Sicily, Luciano allegedly provided the U.S. military with Sicilian Mafia contacts. This collaboration between the Navy and the Mafia became known as Operation Underworld.

The value of Luciano's contribution to the war effort is highly debated. In 1947, the naval officer in charge of Operation Underworld discounted the value of his wartime aid. A 1954 report ordered by now-Governor Dewey stated that Luciano provided many valuable services to Naval Intelligence. The enemy threat to the docks, Luciano allegedly said, was manufactured by the sinking of the SS Normandie in New York Harbor, supposedly directed by Anastasia's brother, Anthony Anastasio; however, the official investigation of the ship sinking found no evidence of sabotage.

On January 3, 1946, in exchange for his wartime cooperation, Dewey reluctantly commuted Luciano's pandering sentence on the condition that he would not resist deportation to Italy. Luciano accepted the deal, although he still maintained that he was a U.S. citizen and not subject to deportation. On February 2, 1946, two federal immigration agents transported Luciano from Sing Sing prison to Ellis Island in New York Harbor for deportation proceedings. On February 9, the night before his departure, Luciano shared a spaghetti dinner on his freighter with Anastasia and five other guests. On February 10, Luciano's ship sailed from Brooklyn for Italy. On February 28, after a 17-day voyage, the ship arrived in Naples. On arrival, Luciano told reporters he would probably reside in Sicily.

== Havana Conference ==
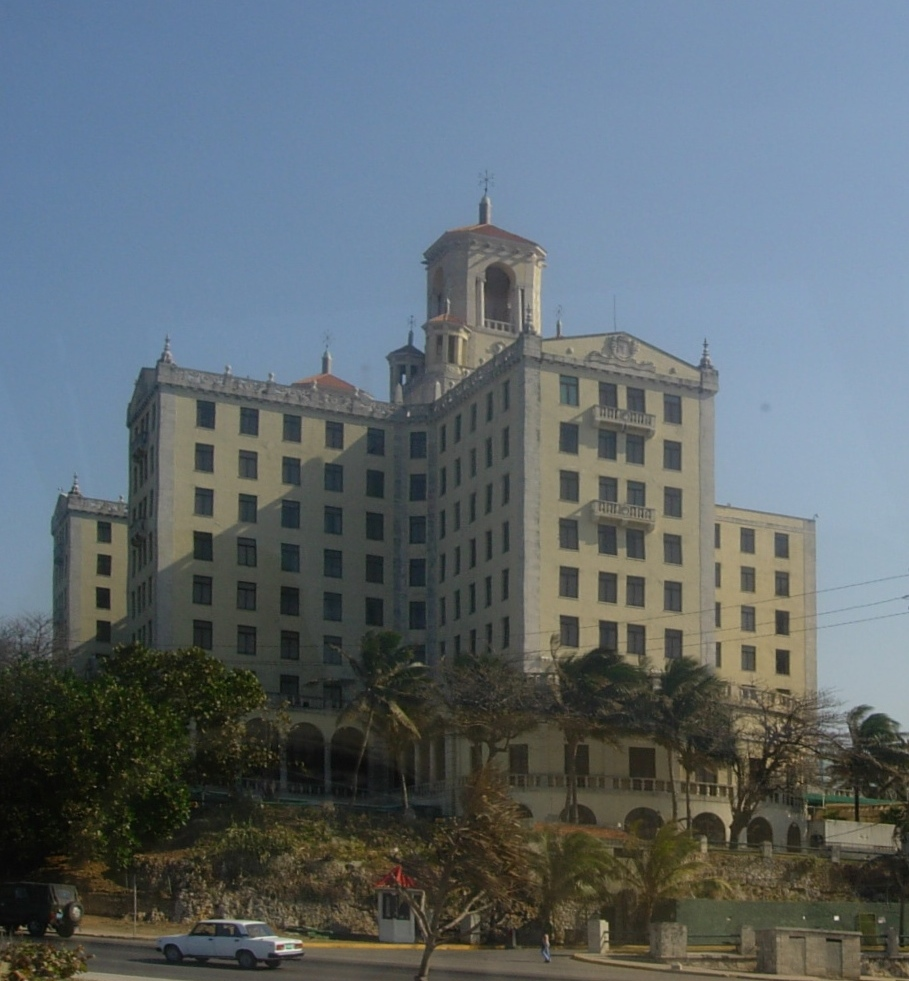
The Hotel Nacional de Cuba in Havana, former residence of Luciano in Cuba and the venue for the Havana Conference

In October 1946, Luciano secretly relocated to the Cuban capital of Havana, first taking a freighter from Naples to Caracas, Venezuela, then a flight to Rio de Janeiro, Brazil, before flying to Mexico City and doubling back to Caracas, where he took a private plane to Camagüey, Cuba, finally arriving on October 29. He was then driven to Havana, where he moved into an estate in the Miramar section of the city. Luciano wanted to move closer to the U.S. so that he could resume control over American Mafia operations and eventually return home. He was already established as a major investor in Cuban gambling and hotel projects. Lansky suggested Luciano and Siegel invest a half-million dollars to fund Luciano's casinos. Lansky delivered the money to Cuban dictator Fulgencio Batista, who was guaranteed US$3- or US$5 million annually.

In 1946, Lansky called a meeting of the heads of the major crime families in Havana that December, dubbed the Havana Conference. The ostensible reason was to see singer Frank Sinatra perform; however, the real reason was to discuss mob business, with Luciano in attendance. The three topics under discussion were: the heroin trade, Cuban gambling and what to do about Siegel and his floundering Flamingo Hotel project in Las Vegas. The Conference took place at the Hotel Nacional de Cuba and lasted a little more than a week. During the conference, on December 20, Luciano had a private meeting with Genovese in Luciano's hotel suite. The year before, the United States Army Criminal Investigation Division had shipped Genovese from Italy to New York to face trial on his 1934 murder charge.

In June 1946, the charges were dismissed, which left Genovese free to return to mob business. Unlike Costello, Luciano had never trusted Genovese. In the meeting, Genovese tried to convince Luciano to become a titular "boss of bosses" and let Genovese run everything. Luciano calmly rejected Genovese's suggestion, saying: "There is no Boss of Bosses. I turned it down in front of everybody. If I ever change my mind, I will take the title. But it won't be up to you. Right now, you work for me, and I ain't in the mood to retire. Don't you ever let me hear this again, or I'll lose my temper."

Soon after the conference began, the U.S. government learned that Luciano was in Cuba. Luciano had been publicly fraternizing with Sinatra as well as visiting numerous nightclubs, so his presence was no secret in Havana. The U.S. started putting pressure on the Cuban government to expel him; on February 21, 1947, Federal Bureau of Narcotics Commissioner Harry J. Anslinger notified the Cubans that the U.S. would block all shipment of narcotic prescription drugs while Luciano remained in the country. Two days later, the Cuban government announced that Luciano was in custody and would be deported to Italy within 48 hours.

== Operating in Italy ==
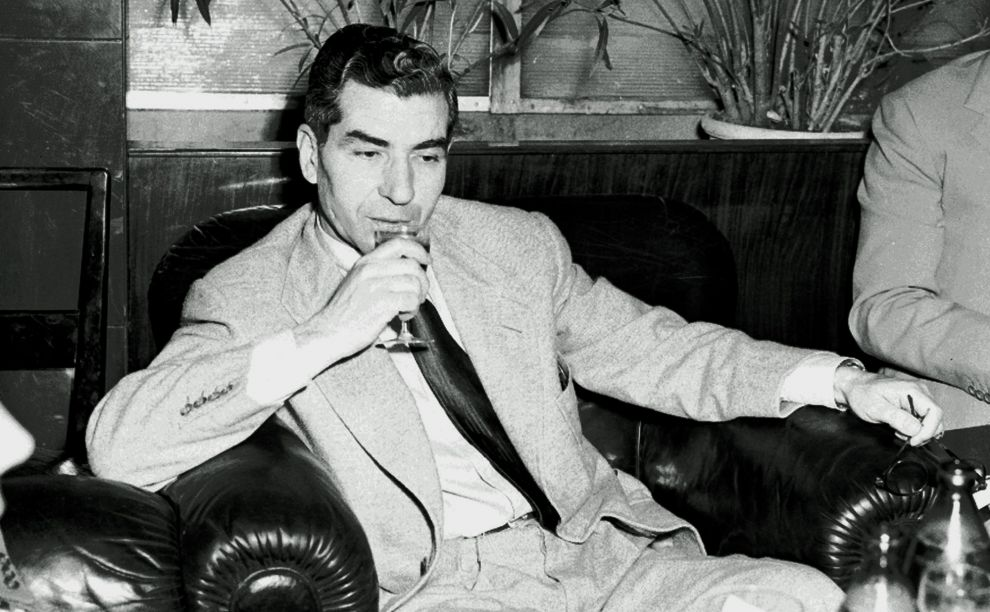
Luciano at the Excelsior Hotel in Rome, 1948

Luciano was placed on a freighter bound for Genoa. After his secret trip to Cuba, Luciano spent the rest of his life in Italy under tight police surveillance. When he arrived in Genoa on April 11, 1947, Italian police arrested him and sent him to a jail in Palermo. On May 11, a regional commission in Palermo warned Luciano to stay out of trouble and released him.

In Sicily, Lucky Luciano maintained close ties with important Mafia figures of Palermo, particularly with Antonino Sorci and Rosario Mancino, with whom he was allegedly involved in real estate speculation and coordinated transatlantic narcotics trafficking operations.

In early July 1949, police in Rome arrested Luciano on suspicion of involvement in the shipping of narcotics to New York. On July 15, after a week in jail, police released Luciano without filing any charges. The authorities also permanently banned him from visiting Rome. On June 9, 1951, Luciano was questioned by Naples police on suspicion of illegally bringing $57,000 in cash and a new American car into Italy. After 20 hours of questioning, police released Luciano without any charges.

In 1952, the Italian government revoked Luciano's passport after complaints from U.S. and Canadian law enforcement officials. On November 1, 1954, an Italian judicial commission in Naples applied strict limits on Luciano for two years. He was required to report to the police every Sunday, to stay home every night and not to leave Naples without police permission. The commission cited Luciano's alleged involvement in the narcotics trade as the reason for these restrictions.

== American power struggle ==
By 1957, Genovese felt strong enough to move against Luciano and his acting boss, Costello. He was aided in this move by Gambino, now the Anastasia family's underboss. On May 2, following Genovese's orders, Vincent Gigante ambushed Costello in the lobby of his Central Park apartment building, The Majestic. Gigante called out, "This is for you, Frank", and as Costello turned, shot him in the head. After firing his weapon, Gigante quickly left, thinking he had killed Costello; however, the bullet had only grazed Costello's head and he was not seriously injured. Although Costello refused to cooperate with police, Gigante was arrested for attempted murder. He was acquitted at trial, thanking Costello in the courtroom after the verdict. Costello was allowed to retire after ceding control of what is today called the Genovese crime family to Genovese. Luciano was powerless to stop these events.

On October 25, 1957, Genovese and Gambino successfully arranged the murder of Anastasia, another Luciano ally. The following month, Genovese called a meeting of bosses in Apalachin, New York, to approve his takeover of the Genovese family and to establish his national power. Instead, the Apalachin Meeting turned into a fiasco when law enforcement became aware of the meeting and conducted a raid. Over 65 high-ranking mobsters were arrested, and the Mafia was subjected to publicity and numerous grand jury summonses. The enraged mobsters blamed Genovese for the disaster, opening a window of opportunity for Genovese's opponents. Luciano allegedly attended a meeting at a hotel in Palermo to discuss heroin trade as part of the French Connection. After this meeting, Luciano allegedly helped pay part of $100,000 to a Puerto Rican drug dealer to falsely implicate Genovese in a drug deal. On April 4, 1959, Genovese was convicted in New York of conspiracy to violate federal narcotics laws. Sent to prison for fifteen years, Genovese tried to run his crime family from prison until his death in 1969.

== Personal life and death ==
In 1929, Luciano met Gay Orlova, a featured dancer in one of Broadway's leading nightclubs, Hollywood. They were inseparable until he went to prison but were never married. In early 1948, he met Igea Lissoni, a Milanese ballerina 20 years younger than he, whom he later described as the love of his life. In the summer, Lissoni moved in with him. Although some reports said the couple married in 1949, others state that they only exchanged rings. Luciano and Lissoni lived together in Luciano's house in Naples. He continued to have affairs with other women, resulting in many arguments with Lissoni during which he physically struck her. In 1959, Lissoni died of breast cancer. Luciano never had children, and at one point gave an explanation, stating that "I didn't want no son of mine to go through life as the son of Luciano, the gangster. That's one thing I still hate Dewey for, making me a gangster in the eyes of the world."

Luciano died of a heart attack at Naples Airport on January 26, 1962. He had gone there to meet with American producer Martin Gosch about a film based on his life. To avoid antagonizing other Mafia members, Luciano had previously refused to authorize a film, but reportedly relented after the death of Lissoni. After the meeting with Gosch, Luciano had a heart attack and died, unaware that Italian drug agents had followed him to the airport in anticipation of arresting him on drug smuggling charges. Three days later, 300 people attended a funeral service for Luciano in Naples. His body was conveyed along the streets of Naples in a horse-drawn hearse. With the permission of the U.S. government, Luciano's relatives took his body back to New York for burial. He was buried in Saint John Cemetery in Middle Village, Queens. More than 2,000 mourners attended his funeral. Gambino, Luciano's longtime friend, gave his eulogy.

== Legacy ==
In 1998, Time characterized Luciano as the "criminal mastermind" among the top 20 most influential builders and titans of the 20th century.

== In popular culture ==
Films

- Marked Woman (1937) – fictionalized version of Dewey's successful prosecution of Luciano. The Dewey character was played by Humphrey Bogart and the Luciano character was played by Eduardo Ciannelli.
- Deported (1950) – a story about a character based on Luciano and played by Jeff Chandler.
- The Valachi Papers (1972) – Luciano was portrayed by Angelo Infanti.
- Lucky Luciano (1973) – Luciano was portrayed by Gian Maria Volonté; Federal Bureau of Narcotics (FBN) agent Charlie Siragusa portrayed himself in the film.
- Lepke (1975) – Luciano was portrayed by Vic Tayback.
- Brass Target (1978) – Luciano was portrayed by Lee Montague.
- The Cotton Club (1984) – Luciano was portrayed by Joe Dallesandro.
- Mobsters (1991) – Luciano was portrayed by Christian Slater.
- Bugsy (1991) – Luciano was portrayed by Bill Graham.
- Billy Bathgate (1991) – Luciano was portrayed by Stanley Tucci.
- White Hot: The Mysterious Murder of Thelma Todd (TV 1991) – Luciano was portrayed by Robert Davi.
- The Outfit (1993) – Luciano was portrayed by Billy Drago.
- Sleepers (1996) – King Benny, a local gangster boss, is a former hitman for Luciano.
- Hoodlum (1997) – Luciano was portrayed by Andy García.
- Bonanno: A Godfather's Story (TV 1999) – Luciano was portrayed by Vince Corazza.
- Lansky (TV 1999) – Luciano was portrayed by Anthony LaPaglia.
- The Real Untouchables (TV 2001) – Luciano was portrayed by David Viggiano.
- Lansky (2021) – Luciano was portrayed by Shane McRae.

TV series

- The Untouchables (1959–1962) – Luciano was portrayed by Robert Carricart.
- The Untouchables (1993–1994) – Luciano was portrayed by David Darlow.
- The Lawless Years (1959-1961) episode "Lucky Silva" depicts a fictionalized version of Luciano as the title character portrayed by Martin Landau.
- The Witness (1960–1961) – Luciano was portrayed by Telly Savalas.
- The Gangster Chronicles (1981) – Luciano was portrayed by Michael Nouri.
- Boardwalk Empire (2010–2014) – Luciano was portrayed by Vincent Piazza.
- The Making of the Mob: New York (2015) – Luciano was portrayed by Rich Graff.
- Hache (2019–2021) – Luciano was portrayed by Giampiero Judica.

Documentary series

- Mafia's Greatest Hits – Luciano features in the second episode of UK history TV channel Yesterday's documentary series.

Books

- Luciano's Luck by Jack Higgins (1981) – fictional based on the Luciano's World War II supposed war efforts.
- The Last Testament of Lucky Luciano by Martin A. Gosch and Richard Hammer (1975) – semi-autobiographical, based on Luciano's entire lifespan as dictated by him.
- Live by Night by Dennis Lehane (2012) – Luciano is a minor character appearing in the story of fictional gangster Joe Coughlin. He is further mentioned in the sequel "World Gone By".
- Santangelo novels (1981–2015) by Jackie Collins – Lucky Santangelo named after Luciano.

Video game

- A3! (2017) by Liber Entertainment – the Autumn troupe's first play references the names of Luciano and Lansky.

Music

- Alternative Trap by LUCKI (2013) – Luciano's mugshot can be seen on the album cover.

== Notes ==
American Mafia
Preceded by Joseph Catania	Genovese crime family Underboss; 1931	Succeeded by Vito Genovese
Preceded by Joe Masseria	Genovese crime family Boss; 1931–1946	Succeeded by Frank Costello
Preceded by Salvatore Maranzano as boss of bosses	Capo di tutti capi Chairman of the Commission; 1931–1946	Succeeded by Vincent Mangano as chairman of the Commission
