= Altemio Sanchez =

American serial killer and serial rapist (1958–2023)

- Altemio Sanchez
- Born: Altemio C. Sanchez; January 19, 1958; San Sebastián, Puerto Rico, U.S.
- Died: September 22, 2023 (aged 65); Millard Fillmore Suburban Hospital, Amherst, New York, U.S.
- Cause of death: Suicide by exsanguination
- Other names: The Bike Path Killer, The Bike Path Rapist; Uncle Al
- Spouse: Kathleen Sanchez (m. 1980; div. 2007)
- Children: 3
- Status: Deceased
- Convictions: Second degree murder (3 counts); Rape; Solicitation
- Penalty: 75 years to life in prison

Details
- Victims: 3 (Murder), 9–15+ (Rape)
- Span of crimes: 1975 – September 29, 2006
- Country: United States
- State: New York
- Date apprehended: January 15, 2007
- Imprisoned at: Clinton Correctional Facility, Dannemora, New York

Altemio C. Sanchez (January 19, 1958 – September 22, 2023), also known as the Bike Path Rapist (and later Killer), was a serial killer of Puerto Rican descent, who is known to have raped and murdered at least three women, and raped at least 9 to 15 girls and women in and around Buffalo, New York during a 31-year span from 1975, though perhaps earlier, until 2006. He was apprehended in 2007 through forensic DNA evidence and sentenced to 75 years-to-life, serving 16 years before dying from apparent suicide in 2023.

== Background ==
Sanchez was born January 19, 1958, in San Sebastián, Puerto Rico. His mother attempted to terminate the pregnancy by overdosing on pills. She had discovered that his father was having an affair with a prostitute, prompting her and Altemio's relocation to Florida when he was 2 years old. Sanchez lived in Miami Florida before moving to North Collins, NY. He had three siblings (one brother and two sisters) and was described by an aunt as being a serious, quiet, and nice kid.

Sanchez was a machinist and factory worker who worked afternoon and night shifts at the former American Brass Company plant on Military Road in the Kenmore/Buffalo area. He lived in the Cleveland Hill neighborhood of Cheektowaga, New York.

Sanchez was married to Kathleen, and had two adult sons. He served as basketball coach of his sons' team at their elementary school in Cheektowaga, and was the boys' team Little League Baseball coach. He enjoyed playing golf, gardening, and is said to have lived a "regular" life. Sanchez had also registered to run in one of the annual Linda Yalem Safety Run (formerly called the Linda Yalem Memorial Run) at the University at Buffalo, a run dedicated to the memory of one of his murder victims.

Sanchez was involved in the community and was well-liked by his neighbors, some of whom called him "Uncle Al" due to his charisma and interactions with them. When Sanchez initially began to strangle and kill his victims, it is believed that he used a rope or cord. He also beat and/or raped his victims during the attacks, and several of them are thought to have fought hard against him.

In later years of Sanchez's crimes, he used a ligature, wire, or garrote, to strangle and suffocate his victims. Prior to Sanchez's arrest, DNA evidence suggested that the Bike Path Killer was of Hispanic descent, and an FBI profiler stated that the killer frequented sex workers. Sanchez was arrested in both 1991 and 1999 for soliciting prostitution. On one occasion, Sanchez also solicited prostitution from an undercover police officer for $25 and was fined $75.

== Murders and confessions ==
Murders for which Sanchez confessed responsibility include those of three women:

- Linda Yalem - A sophomore at the University at Buffalo (UB), studying communications, and training for the New York City Marathon, who was raped and killed on September 29, 1990, along the Ellicott Creek Bike Path,
- Majane Mazur - She was known to have been a sex worker, murdered in November 1992 near the Amtrak rail line in downtown Buffalo.
- Joan Diver - A nurse, wife of a chemistry professor at University at Buffalo, and mother of four, who was murdered by strangulation on September 29, 2006, the 16th anniversary date of his first murder. Diver's body was found on a bike path in Newstead, New York, on October 1, 2006. She was not raped.

The killer acquired the nickname because some of his crimes took place near secluded bike paths. He had been originally known as the Bike Path Rapist, later Killer.

== Investigations ==
Investigations into the murder of Linda Yalem (1990) were originally conducted by the Amherst, New York Police Department; the murder of Majane Mazur (1992) was originally conducted by the Buffalo Police Department; after the murder of Joan Diver (2006) a special task force – the Bike Path Task Force – was created by the Erie County (NY) Sheriff's Office, which included the New York State Police, Buffalo Police Department, Amherst Police Department; and support assistance from the Federal Bureau of Investigation (FBI).

Police say DNA found at eight crime scenes matches DNA secretly taken from Sanchez before his arrest. DNA from Sanchez was obtained after police who were members of the Bike Path Task Force acquired it. They acquired silverware, a glass, and a napkin that Sanchez used while at dinner at a Latin American restaurant, Solé, in Amherst, New York, on January 13, 2007.

They submitted the items to the Erie County forensic lab in order to test for DNA samples. The DNA samples matched those previously taken from the Bike Path Killer of Yalem. A newspaper article in The Buffalo News states that between 1986 and 1994, Yalem's attacker "was linked to attacks on nine other" women in the area. At the time the newspaper article went to print, police had not yet identified, nor arrested Sanchez.

Another newspaper article in McClatchy – Tribune Business News from 2007 states that police believed the attacker of Yalem and Diver was connected to "six attacks and possibly a seventh." A 2002 article that was published by Court TV identifies and describes eight victims and/or survivors of attacks by Sanchez. The manner in which each was attacked was similar in that they were all strangled with a rope, cord, wire, ligature, or garrote, as well as being beaten, raped, and/or killed. The victims and/or survivors of the attacks were between 14 and 44 years old.

In 1992, through investigating the death of Yalem, police tied the DNA of Sanchez, who had not been apprehended, to attacks on six other area women, including one in Delaware Park. Police were unable to connect DNA to a seventh attack on a 17-year-old girl in Hamburg, New York, although circumstances surrounding the attack on her were similar. On the day that Sanchez confessed to the murders of Yalem, Mazur, and Diver, the Hamburg, New York attack survivor (who desired to remain anonymous) expressed surprise and relief. Denise Foster is a survivor of an attack by Sanchez when she was 17 years old, near railroad tracks in Buffalo, New York. Foster was raped and strangled with a ligature by Sanchez, and the scars from the strangulation she experienced are still visible. Diver was the only one of Sanchez's known victims who was not raped. It is believed she died during the strangulation before Sanchez could rape her.

Sanchez is also a suspect in an ongoing investigation for the murder of a 15-year-old girl in 1985. Katherine Herold was beaten and murdered with the circumstances of her death similar to those of Diver's. Katherine was the daughter of the Director of the Buffalo Museum of Science and a professor at Buffalo State College. Her body was found on the railroad tracks of the CSX rail line in Kenmore, New York, on July 1, 1985, near where Sanchez worked. Deputy District Attorney Frank A. Sedita III did not ask Sanchez if he killed Herold during questioning prior to his sentencing. District Attorney Frank Clark stated that there was no evidence in Katherine's murder with which to charge Sanchez. Katherine's murder has never been solved.

An error in the Sanchez case file occurred two days after a woman was attacked in 1981, when she told police she spotted the man who had raped her driving away from a local shopping area parking lot, she took down the license plate number and informed the police. When detectives questioned Wilfredo Sanchez Caraballo, the car's owner, he provided a solid alibi for the rape and the investigation was dropped. However, some twenty-five years later, Caraballo was interviewed by Amherst's Bike Path Rapist Task Force and admitted that on the day that the car was identified by the victim he wasn't driving it. Caraballo had lent the car to his nephew, Altemio Sanchez.

== Arrest ==
On January 15, 2007, a police task force in Erie County, New York, arrested Sanchez and charged him with the murders of Yalem, Mazur, and Diver. On January 19, 2007, an Erie County grand jury voted to indict Sanchez for the murders of Yalem and Mazur.

== Prosecution ==
Many of the rapes attributed to Sanchez were unprosecuted due to the statute of limitations on the prosecution of rape that was in effect in New York at the time those crimes were committed. The statute of limitations in New York State has since been changed; however, it cannot be applied retroactively for the rapes. There is no statute of limitations, however, on homicides, and therefore, Sanchez was prosecuted for the killings of Yalem, Mazur, and Diver.

On May 17, 2007, Sanchez pled guilty to the murders of Yalem, Mazur, and Diver in a surprise confession. Sanchez mumbled his confessions in court through tears. In court, Sanchez was represented by Attorney Andrew C. LoTempio, who denied Sanchez's guilt regarding all of the rapes and murders for which he was responsible. LoTempio later said that Sanchez had a troubled childhood, observed and/or had a traumatic life experience when he was 12 years old, and had deep-seated resentment toward women. LoTempio also said, however, that he was not making excuses for Sanchez.

== Sentencing and imprisonment ==
On August 15, 2007, Sanchez was sentenced to 75 years to life in prison. He was sentenced by New York State Supreme Court Justice Christopher J. Burns. He was imprisoned at the Clinton Correctional Facility in the Adirondack Mountains of New York State. It was said he might be moved to a facility closer to his family if he confessed to further murders.

== Death ==
Sanchez was found unresponsive in his cell with a self-inflicted cut on his arm. He was taken to Millard Fillmore Suburban Hospital in Amherst, New York, where he was pronounced dead on September 22, 2023, aged 65.

== Exoneration of Anthony Capozzi ==
In March 2007, Anthony Capozzi was freed from state prison after serving 22 years for two rapes with a similar modus operandi. After the arrest of Sanchez, investigators realized that the crimes were similar and took place in the same area, and that Sanchez and Capozzi closely resembled each other at the time the crimes were committed. A sample of DNA from Sanchez had been linked to the rapes for which Capozzi had been wrongly convicted in 1985. Once police made the realization of Capozzi's innocence, they inquired with the Erie County Medical Center (ECMC) to obtain his DNA sample. ECMC stated that there was no DNA sample of Capozzi's on record. This was correct information. It was the DA's Office that incorrectly issued a subpoena for Capozzi's DNA, when the subpoena should have requested the victims' DNA. Medical records and laboratory specimens are maintained under a patient's name (victims, not the alleged perpetrator(s), are the patients). Once the DA's subpoena error was realized, a new subpoena was correctly issued and the victims' DNA samples were located, leading to Capozzi's exoneration. Capozzi maintained his innocence while in prison, and was repeatedly denied parole for over two decades. Capozzi, who has schizophrenia, and his attorney, settled a civil lawsuit for $4.25 million for being wrongfully convicted and imprisoned. Former New York State Assembly Member Sam Hoyt and New York State Senator Dale Volker introduced legislation that would expedite such lawsuits. This bill is known as Anthony's Law.

== See also ==
- List of serial killers in the United States
