= Gatto =

Gatto is a surname. Notable people with the surname include:

- Alessandro Gatto (born 1994), Italian footballer
- Alfonso Gatto (1909–1976), Italian poet and writer
- Alfredo Caruana Gatto (1868–1926), Maltese lawyer, politician and naturalist
- Anthony Gatto (born 1973), American juggler
- Carl Gatto (1937–2012), American politician
- Dan Gatto (born 1970), American musician
- Eddie Gatto (1916–1944), American football player
- Emanuele Gatto (born 1994), Italian footballer
- Giovanni Gatto (died 1484), Italian Roman Catholic bishop
- Giulia Gatto (born 1987), Italian tennis player
- Joe Gatto (disambiguation)
- John Taylor Gatto (1935–2018), American educator, writer, and activist
- Laura Gatto (born 1977), Italian long jumper
- Leonardo Gatto (born 1992), Italian footballer
- Massimiliano Gatto (born 1995), Italian footballer
- Melissa Gatto (born 1996), Brazilian mixed martial artist
- Mick Gatto (born 1955), Australian debt collector
- Mike Gatto (born 1974), American politician
- Oscar Gatto (born 1985), Italian cyclist
- Roberto Gatto (born 1958), Italian jazz drummer
- Salvatore Gatto (born 1984), Italian racing driver
- Victor Gatto (born 1947), American football player
