= Church of St. Dismas =

Church of St. Dismas may refer to:

- Church of St. Dismas, the Good Thief in Dannemora, New York, USA
- Church of St. Dismas in Zagreb, Croatia
