= David Bullock (serial killer) =

American serial killer (born 1960)

- Born: November 13, 1960 (age 65); New York City, New York, U.S.
- Other name: "The .38 Caliber Killer"
- Convictions: Second degree murder (6 counts); Burglary; Theft
- Penalty: 150 years to life

Details
- Victims: 6+
- Span of crimes: 1981–1982
- Country: United States
- State: New York
- Date apprehended: January 14, 1982
- Imprisoned at: Clinton Correctional Facility, Dannemora, New York

David Bullock (born November 13, 1960), known as The .38 Caliber Killer, is an American serial killer and former male prostitute who killed at least six people in New York City between December 1981 and January 1982. Owing to his unassuming appearance and character, his killing spree was undetected by local police for some time, who were unaware that a serial murderer was operating in the area.

== Criminal career ==
Between the period of 1978 and 1981, Bullock was prosecuted five times on charges of burglary, robbery, and grand larceny.

== Arrest and exposure ==
Bullock was arrested on January 14, 1982, in the basement of an apartment building as a witness in the disappearance of his roommate, Michael Winley. During the search, a .38 caliber revolver and a shotgun were seized. A few hours after his detainment, Bullock confessed to authorities that he had committed six murders. The first victim was 42-year-old teacher and theatrical actor James Weber, whose body was discovered on December 5, 1981, in Central Park, hours after Weber's performance as the father in a production of Babes in Toyland at the Light Opera of Manhattan. After shooting Weber, Bullock stole his money and ID, which delayed the victim's identification by a few days. The reasons for Weber's appearance late at night in the park were never established, with police suggesting that the deceased and his killer were familiar and in a homosexual relationship. This theory was rejected by Weber's relatives and acquaintances, while Bullock himself denied dating James. According to him, he had gone to the park to shoot birds when he came across Weber, deciding to kill him at random.

A few days later, Bullock killed his 23-year-old friend, prostitute Edwina Atkins. According to Bullock, he had told her about killing Weber, but in response, she laughed in his face in disbelief. After shooting Atkins because "she knew too much", he set fire to the apartment in order to destroy any evidence of a crime. His next confessed victim was 29-year-old investment consultant Stephen Glenn Hassell, who was promised sexual services in exchange for money. Hassell took Bullock to his luxurious Manhattan apartment, where, late in the night of December 15, Bullock shot him after covering his face with a pillow. Although Hassell was an influential person and the murder had taken place in a prestigious area of the city, Bullock managed to leave the crime scene unnoticed, leaving no evidence or clues for the investigators.

Bullock's fourth victim was 50-year-old Heriberto Morales, a gay man whom Bullock had known since 1980. On the evening of December 22, Bullock recalled that he and Morales were at a Christmas party, after which they went to Heriberto's apartment. According to Bullock, while the victim was discussing his Christmas tree, Bullock shot and killed him. Bullock then stole some jewelry and other valuables and, as with Atkins' killing, set fire to the apartment before leaving. The serial killer's last victim was 28-year-old security guard Eric Michael Fuller, whom Bullock shot on January 4, 1982, with a shotgun during a robbery.

Subsequently, Bullock admitted that he was responsible for his roommate's disappearance: according to his claims, he shot Winley on December 23, 1981, and threw his corpse into the Harlem River. Police searched, unsuccessfully, for the body. After examining the five murder scenes, ballistic experts concluded that the same .38 caliber revolver, which belonged to Bullock, had been used to kill the victims.

In addition to his confirmed murders, Bullock claimed to detectives that he had committed four other shootings.

== Trial and imprisonment ==
David Bullock's trial, a high-profile case for its time, began in the fall of 1982. He was sent to be mentally evaluated; psychiatrists determined that he had no underlying mental illnesses or abnormalities but acknowledged that the defendant had an impaired emotional state. He was charged with six murders, although Winley's body was never found. At the court hearings, Bullock appeared to be in a positive mood, describing in detail the crimes he had committed in a sarcastic and extremely cynical tone, without expressing any remorse. On October 26, 1982, he pleaded guilty to all charges, naming hedonism as his main motive, saying: "I was in the Christmas spirit. It made me happy." Three days later, he was sentenced to 150 years' imprisonment; at the time, such long sentences were unprecedented in the state's history.

== See also ==
- List of serial killers in the United States
