= Leslie Torres =

American spree killer

- Born: March 5, 1970 (age 56); New York, New York, U.S.
- Status: Incarcerated
- Convictions: Second degree murder (2 counts); Attempted second degree murder (2 counts); First degree robbery First degree assault Second degree criminal possession of a weapon
- Penalty: 48 years and four months to life in prison

Details
- Date: January 1–8, 1988
- Killed: 5
- Injured: 6
- Weapon: .22 revolver
- Imprisoned at: Clinton Correctional Facility, Dannemora, New York

Leslie Torres (born March 5, 1970) is an American spree killer who, in the period from January 1 to 8, 1988, attacked 11 people in the East Harlem neighborhood of Manhattan. Five people died from the attacks and six were left severely injured. He later turned himself in and confessed to the crimes, of which he was convicted and sentenced to life imprisonment.

At the time of the crimes, Torres was 17 years old, making him one of the youngest recorded spree killers in North American history.

== Early life and education ==
Leslie Torres was born on April 12, 1970, in New York City to Puerto Rican parents. Until 1977, he lived with his parents in East Harlem, where the largest Hispanic diaspora lived in the city, but after they divorced, Torres moved with his mother to Puerto Rico. They lived in an area plagued by poverty and crime, which affected the Torreses.

In the mid-1980s, Torres lost interest in studying and began to spend most of his time on the streets, where he began to drink alcohol and use drugs. He was eventually kicked out of school and left Puerto Rico in the summer of 1987, returning to New York City, where his father lived. He continued to abuse drugs and developed an addiction to crack cocaine that eventually resulted in him leaving his father's house and living on the streets. By that time, the cost of crack cocaine had reached from $300 to $500, due to which Torres decided to start robbing people to fund his habits.

== Murders ==
On January 1, 1988, Torres entered a store in East Harlem and robbed two men at gunpoint. After they gave him their money, Torres fired several shots from his .22 caliber revolver at them - the first received a severe gunshot wound to the chest, while the second injured his wrist, but both survived. Half an hour later, Torres attacked a 38-year-old woman in another district, wounding her in the arm and buttocks, but she also survived. Another half hour later, Torres confronted 62-year-old Horatio Rivera and shot him twice in the head, killing him. Later that same evening, he committed another robbery, but nobody was harmed on this occasion. In total, he managed to steal only 28 dollars.

On the afternoon of January 2, Torres committed three robberies in the East Harlem area. In the first case, he robbed a furniture store, but caused no serious harm to anyone. He then went to another store, where he shot and killed the store owner, 40-year-old Ecuadorian immigrant Milton Ronquillo. Half an hour later, Torres went to another grocery store and shot at three people: a teenager, Shawn Foster, was wounded, but the store owner, Alberto Paypumps, died on the scene.

On the late evening of January 7, Torres robbed another store and shot two men - one of the victims, 28-year-old Pablo Rojas, died in hospital from his injuries two hours after his admission, while the other, 34-year-old Juan Corona, was left permanently blinded. On the late evening on the following day, Torres robbed another grocery store in East Harlem, where he shot and killed the clerk, Jesus Rivera, by shooting him once in the head. He then stole a small amount of cash and a portable radio.

From the eight-day robbery spree, he had stolen less than $2,000.

== Arrest ==
In the midst of the attacks, the New York City Police Department organized a task force of about 100 men to investigate the robberies and murders. On January 8, just a few minutes after Rivera's murder, Torres was noticed by three police officers patrolling the area. Since he matched the suspect's description, they approached to question him, but Torres fled. Officers chased him for 20 minutes, eventually cornering him on a rooftop of an apartment building, whereupon he surrendered without further incident. At the time of his arrest, he did not have his gun at hand, having apparently dropped it during the chase. The weapon was later found inside a snow-filled trash can.

== Public outcry ==
After his arrest, Torres confessed to all the crimes he had committed, blaming them on his addiction to crack cocaine. The incident once again sparked a wave of debates about tougher penalties for juveniles and a change of nature regarding the handling of war on drugs. At a press conference held after Torres' arrest, Chief Detective Robert Colangelo said that the situation in East Harlem was due to the widespread use and availability of crack cocaine in the area. He also noted that Torres was the first known example of a drug addict committing violent crimes, rather than a drug dealer.

== Trial and imprisonment ==
Torres was charged with five counts of first-degree murder, six counts of attempted murder and nine counts of first-degree robbery. In addition to his own confession, investigators presented ballistics and forensic evidence that linked Torres and his gun to the murders. Not only that, but eleven witnesses also positively identified him as the shooter when presented with photographs of potential suspects.

The trial began in early 1989. Torres' attorneys pleaded that their client be ruled insane, since he had no control over his actions due to his addiction, but evidence presented by the prosecutors suggested that he had not been using drugs at the time of the murders. Ultimately, Torres was found guilty on all charges on February 27, after the jury deliberated for 19 minutes. He remained calm throughout the proceedings and showed no emotion when the guilty verdict was read out.

On April 14 of that year, Torres was sentenced to life imprisonment with a chance of parole after serving 60 years and 10 months, which has since been reduced to 48 years and four months to life in prison. He is currently incarcerated at the Clinton Correctional Facility in Dannemora.

== See also ==
- Crack epidemic in the United States
