= Carl Paivio =

Finnish-American anarchist (1893–1952)

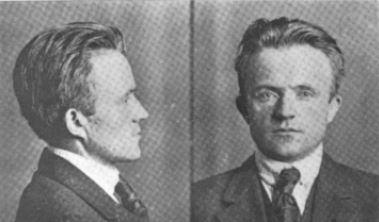
- 1919 mugshot of Carl Paivio
- Born: 23 November 1893; Töysä, Grand Duchy of Finland
- Died: April 1952 (aged 58); Ellis Island, New York
- Occupation: labor activist

Carl Paivio (born Karl Einar Päiviö; 23 November 1893 – April 1952) was a Finnish American labor activist and anarchist. He became known in 1919 during the First Red Scare as Paivio and his fellow anarchist Gust Alonen were convicted of "criminal anarchy" for writing in a radical newspaper. Paivio and Alonen were the first activists convicted in the State of New York for violating the Criminal Anarchy law, although it was passed already in 1902 right after the assassination of the president William McKinley.

== Life ==
Paivio was born in Töysä, and emigrated to the United States as an illegal immigrant at the age of 22. He sailed from Finland via Australia as a crew member of a Finnish merchant ship and boarded Seattle in the fall of 1915. December 1917 Paivio moved to New York City and joined the syndicalist trade union Industrial Workers of the World. He was a member of the Finnish IWW local in the Bronx. It was known as a radical splinter group within the IWW, opposing all centralized power or centralized organization. The group was publishing a Finnish language anarchist paper called Luokkataistelu (The Class Struggle), Paivio was the editor and Gust Alonen worked as the co-editor.

The Lusk Committee raided the IWW Manhattan headquarters on 21 June 1919 and found several copies of the Luokkataistelu paper. The committee was interested on the article ″The Activity of the Rioting Masses″ published in the March edition. Content of this article finally brought Paivio and Alonen the charges of criminal anarchy. The article included the often quoted lines:

A rioting mob is the one and only possible means for organizing a fight in these last open and decisive blood-battles between the capitalists and the working classes. To Hell with the teachings of peaceful revolution. The bloody seizure of power by the working classes is the only possible way, because as long as our enemy is able to raise even one sword a bloodless fight is a day dream.

Paivio and Alonen were arrested in August and the trial started on 6 October. On 28 October 1919 Supreme Court Justice Bartow S. Weeks sentenced them to prison terms of from four to eight years for "criminal anarchy". The court also called for the deportation of Paivio and Alonen when their sentences expired, but it was never executed.

Carl Paivio was released from Clinton Prison in 1923. He continued his activities in several leftist organizations, but according to the autobiography of Elizabeth Gurley Flynn Paivio later moved from anarchism towards communism. He became the national secretary of the Communist Party affiliated Finnish America Mutual Aid Society and was also employed by the International Workers Order. Through the 1930s and 1940s Paivio was a prominent leftist political organizer, lecturer and instructor. During the Second Red Scare led by United States Senator Joseph McCarthy Paivio was held for deportation under the McCarran–Walter Act and kept on Ellis Island, but he died there before he was deported to Finland.
