= Antonino Sorci =

Member of the Sicilian Mafia (1904–1983)

- Born: 1904; Palermo, Sicily, Kingdom of Italy
- Died: 12 April 1983 (aged 78–79); Palermo, Sicily, Italy
- Other names: "Nino Sorci", "U Riccu"
- Children: Carlo Sorci
- Allegiance: Villagrazia Mafia family / Cosa Nostra

Antonino Sorci (1904 – 12 April 1983) was a member of the Sicilian Mafia, capo of the Mafia family of the Villagrazia neighborhood in Palermo, and linked to tobacco smuggling, narcotics trafficking, financial speculation, and real estate operations.

Antonino Sorci was also known as "Nino Sorci" and "u riccu" ("the rich one"), due to his notable wealth.

== Biography ==
Sorci was born in Palermo in 1904. Police records described him as having a criminal record for criminal association and identified him as being involved in smuggling activities. According to the pentito Antonino Calderone, during the Fascist era, Sorci lived for a period in Tunis together with Antonino Saitta, the former capo of the Catania Mafia family.

Back in Sicily, Sorci emerged as one of the prominent figures of the Cosa Nostra during the post-war period. He accumulated wealth through illicit activities, particularly tobacco smuggling and drug trafficking. His criminal and financial connections extended across North Africa and Southern Europe, including operations linked to Tangier, in Morocco, Marseille, Nice and Corsica in France, and Spain.

Sorci maintained close ties with Lucky Luciano and was regarded as Luciano’s “lieutenant” in Palermo during the mid-1950s. He was also associated with other important Mafia figures, such as Rosario Mancino, Pietro Davì, Salvatore Greco, and other members of the Greco family.

He was linked to several business and financial entities, including the Società Ippica Siciliana and the I.S.E.P. (Istituto Sovvenzioni e Prestiti), where he allegedly operated alongside individuals connected to organized crime. Sorci also became involved in real estate and construction speculation in Sicily. In September 1950, Sorci and Rosario Mancino purchased two plots of land known as the Papau and D'Orleans estates, covering a combined area of 164,251 square meters. The transaction price of 31 million lire was regarded as unusually low considering the rapid urban expansion of Palermo and the expected conversion of the land into buildable areas. Additional property transactions involving the D'Orleans estate were recorded in 1954 and 1959.

According to pentito Tommaso Buscetta, Sorci ran a financial company in Palermo in partnership with Capitano Di Carlo. Di Carlo was a businessman from Corleone, not a formal Mafia member, but through this partnership he became connected to Mafia affairs. When Luciano Leggio attempted to extort money from Di Carlo because of this business, Sorci intervened and brought in Salvatore Greco, then secretary of the Commission, who forced Liggio to abandon the extortion attempt. This intervention by Sorci earned him Liggio’s lasting resentment.

Despite relocating to Rimini in Northern Italy, due to his judicial history, Sorci maintained frequent contact with Palermo, managing his business interests through his son Carlo, and traveling back regularly. Testimonies from Buscetta and Salvatore Contorno place him as a key figure with significant Mafia ties, including a special friendship with Stefano Bontade and alliances with other major Mafia families.

After the murder of Stefano Bontade in 1981, Sorci attempted to align with the “winning” factions, particularly the Corleonesi and Michele Greco, offering his properties for Mafia operations. However, despite these gestures, he was never fully trusted due to his prior loyalty to Bontate and earlier conflicts with Liggio. His cousin Francesco Sorci, a capo mandamento in the Mafia Commission, shared similar connections and vulnerabilities.

=== Death ===
Nino Sorci was killed on April 12, 1983, at his estate in Villagrazia, Palermo. Around 8:15 PM, he and his son Carlo, 32, were leaving the villa in a Lancia Delta driven by Carlo when they noticed a Fiat 500 waiting on the road. Carlo attempted to escape, accelerating the car, but the attackers opened fire from two directions, using shotguns and handguns. Carlo was killed instantly by pellets to the chest and head. Nino Sorci was struck twice in the chest and once in the neck and survived long enough to be transported to the Civic Hospital, where he died a few hours later without regaining consciousness. The car, uncontrolled, crashed into a farm road at the estate, stopping on a pile of manure, with chairs and a basket of lemons inside.

Investigators found that Nino Sorci had several checks and a plane ticket to Bologna in his pockets, indicating his intention to return to Emilia-Romagna, where he had been living for years.
