= Rosario Mancino =

Member of the Sicilian Mafia and drug trafficker

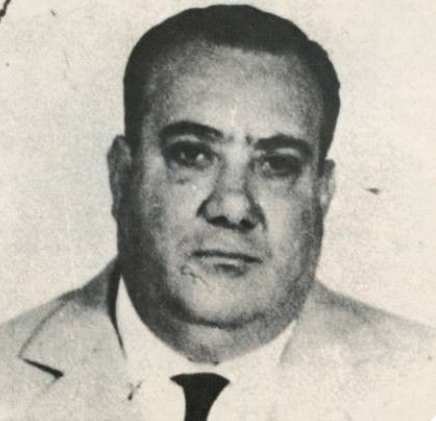
- Rosario Mancino
- Born: 14 January 1915; Palermo, Sicily, Kingdom of Italy
- Died: Unknown
- Other name: Saro
- Known for: Key heroin trafficker for the Cosa Nostra
- Parent(s): Gaetano Mancino; Nunzia Castelli
- Relatives: Salvatore Mancino (brother)
- Allegiance: Brancaccio Mafia family / Cosa Nostra

Rosario Mancino (14 January 1915 – ?) was a member of the Sicilian Mafia, affiliated with the Mafia family of the Brancaccio neighbourhood in Palermo. He was considered one of the leading figures in heroin trafficking within the Mafia from the 1950s to the 1960s.

== Biography ==
Rosario Mancino was born in Palermo, Sicily, on 14 January 1915 to Gaetano Mancino and Nunzia Castelli. He came from modest social origins and initially worked as a port labourer in Palermo. Judicial records indicate that he was convicted several times during the 1930s. In 1932, he received a suspended sentence for forgery; in 1933, he was convicted of theft by the Court of Assizes of Palermo; and in 1938, he was sentenced by the Court of Appeal of Tripoli, Libya for theft. He later obtained rehabilitation for these convictions.

In March 1948, together with his brother Salvatore, Mancino founded the maritime agency “Impresa imbarchi e sbarchi” in Palermo. Officially, the company handled shipping and export operations, including the transport of preserved foods to the United States. Authorities later alleged that the agency also served as cover for international smuggling operations and for Mancino’s frequent overseas travel. During the early 1950s, Mancino expanded into real estate speculation in Palermo. Financial records examined by Italian authorities documented the purchase and redevelopment of several properties. Through apartment construction and land speculation, he reportedly accumulated substantial profits between 1953 and 1963.

Mancino also acquired interests in large tracts of land known as the Papau and D’Orleans estates alongside Antonino Sorci, an important Mafia member. Parts of the D’Orleans property were later sold to the University of Palermo. Investigators further linked Mancino to business ventures in Beirut, Lebanon, where he established a food-processing factory in 1952. Italian financial police and the U.S. Bureau of Narcotics suspected that the facility concealed a clandestine heroin-refining laboratory.

Italian authorities traced Mancino’s rise within organized crime to the arrival in Italy of Lucky Luciano after the latter’s deportation from the United States in 1946. Police reports described Mancino as one of Luciano’s trusted Sicilian associates involved in arranging international narcotics shipments. From 1947 onward, Mancino travelled extensively to the Americas, particularly to the United States, and to the Middle East. Law-enforcement agencies believed these journeys were connected to heroin trafficking routes operated by the Sicilian Mafia and Italian-american mafia.

In 1951, American authorities identified Mancino as a suspected sender of a shipment of 50 kilograms of heroin destined for the United States. He was subsequently connected by investigators to several narcotics and cigarette-smuggling inquiries involving traffickers such as Frank Callace, Frank Coppola, and other Mafia figures. Italian financial police also suspected a fishing vessel owned by Mancino, the ''Luigi III'', of being used for smuggling operations between the Tyrrhenian Sea and the waters near the Galite Islands. Throughout the late 1950s and early 1960s, Mancino’s name repeatedly appeared in police intelligence reports and confiscated notebooks belonging to known traffickers. In 1957, Mancino was also reportedly among the Sicilian mafiosi who attended the Grand Hotel et des Palmes Mafia meeting alongside several prominent Sicilian and American Cosa Nostra figures. In 1960, he was detained in Mexico City together with Angelo La Barbera and Giovanni Mira on suspicion of organizing narcotics trafficking.

By the early 1960s, Mancino had become one of the principal targets of Italian anti-mafia investigations. Authorities described him as closely connected to Angelo La Barbera during the period preceding the outbreak of the First Mafia War in Sicily. In June 1963, an investigating magistrate in Palermo issued an arrest warrant charging Mancino with criminal association and related offences. Investigative reports portrayed him as a Mafia figure engaged in illicit financial activities and drug trafficking, and cited his close relationship with Lucky Luciano as evidence of his role within the Mafia.

Following the issuance of the warrant, Mancino disappeared and remained a fugitive for several years. Italian police, Interpol, and the FBI searched for him until he was recognized and arrested by chance in Naples on 20 October 1967. In December 1970, the Court of Assizes of Catanzaro convicted Mancino of criminal association and sentenced him to four years in prison, legal interdiction, supervised release after completion of the sentence, and payment of court expenses. Earlier that year, he had been temporarily released under an emergency decree and assigned compulsory residence in Borgo San Lorenzo, in Tuscany, where he stayed at the Hotel Sole.

== Sources ==
- Canosa, Romano (1995). Storia della criminalità in Italia dal 1946 a oggi (in Italian). Milan: Feltrinelli Editore. ISBN 978-88-07-10184-7.
- Caruso, Alfio (2000). Da cosa nasce cosa : storia della mafia dal 1943 a oggi (in Italian). Internet Archive. Milan: Longanesi. ISBN 978-88-304-1620-8.
- Dovizio, Ciro (2024). L'alba dell'antimafia: Palermo, «L’Ora» e le prime inchieste sull’«onorata società» (in Italian). Rome: Donzelli Editore. ISBN 978-88-5522-701-8.
- Sterling, Claire (1991). Octopus: How the long reach of the Sicilian Mafia controls the global narcotics trade. New York: Simon & Schuster. ISBN 0-671-73402-4.
