= Clinton Correctional Facility =

Maximum-security men's prison in New York, US

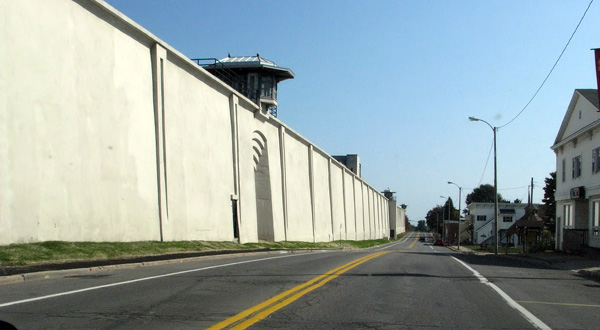
- Interactive map of Clinton Correctional Facility
- Location: Dannemora, New York; 44.7236°N 73.7208°W
- Status: Operational
- Security class: Maximum
- Capacity: 2,959
- Population: 2,865 (December 2003)
- Opened: 1845
- Managed by: New York State Department of Corrections and Community Supervision

Clinton Correctional Facility is a New York State Department of Corrections and Community Supervision maximum security state prison for men located in the Village of Dannemora, New York, United States. The prison is sometimes colloquially referred to as Dannemora (having once served as a massive insane asylum named Dannemora State Hospital for the Criminally Insane), although its name is derived from its location in Clinton County, New York. The southern perimeter wall of the prison borders New York State Route 374. Church of St. Dismas, the Good Thief, a church built by inmates, is located within the walls. The prison is sometimes referred to as New York's Little Siberia, due to the cold winters in Dannemora and the isolation of the upstate area. It is the largest maximum-security prison and the third-oldest prison in New York. The staff includes about 1,000 officers and supervisors.

In the post-Furman v. Georgia period and prior to the 2007 repeal of the death penalty, it housed New York State's death row for men.

== History ==
Built in 1844, the prison originally served as a site where prisoners were used to supply labor to local mines in both Dannemora and nearby Lyon Mountain. This enterprise was not profitable, and by 1877, mining had ended with the prisoners being put to work on other trades.

As the population grew and more prisoners were housed there, in 1887, authorities had new 60-foot-high walls built, which still stand. In 1892, the first prisoner was executed in the electric chair at the prison. Twenty-six men were executed between 1892 and 1913. This period also had many prisoners cured of tuberculosis, due in part to the clean air in the Adirondacks. As at the time antibiotics were not available to treat the frequently fatal disease, prisoners diagnosed with it were frequently transferred from other prisons.

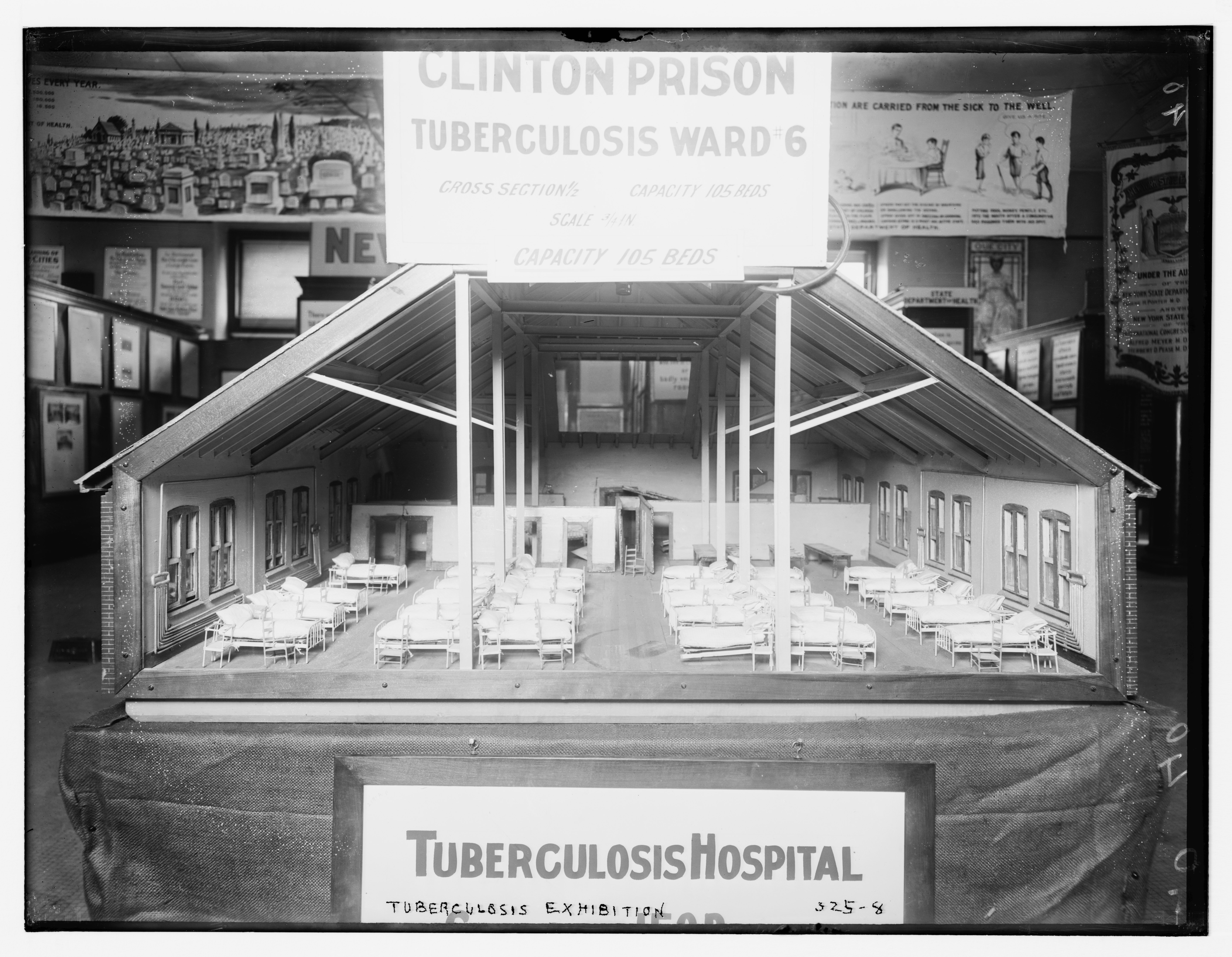
Clinton Prison Tuberculosis Ward 6, Tuberculosis Hospital

In 1899, a mental health facility, the Dannemora State Hospital, was built on the grounds to house prisoners who became insane while serving their sentences. Such prisoners were retained in the facility if they remained insane following the completion of their sentences.

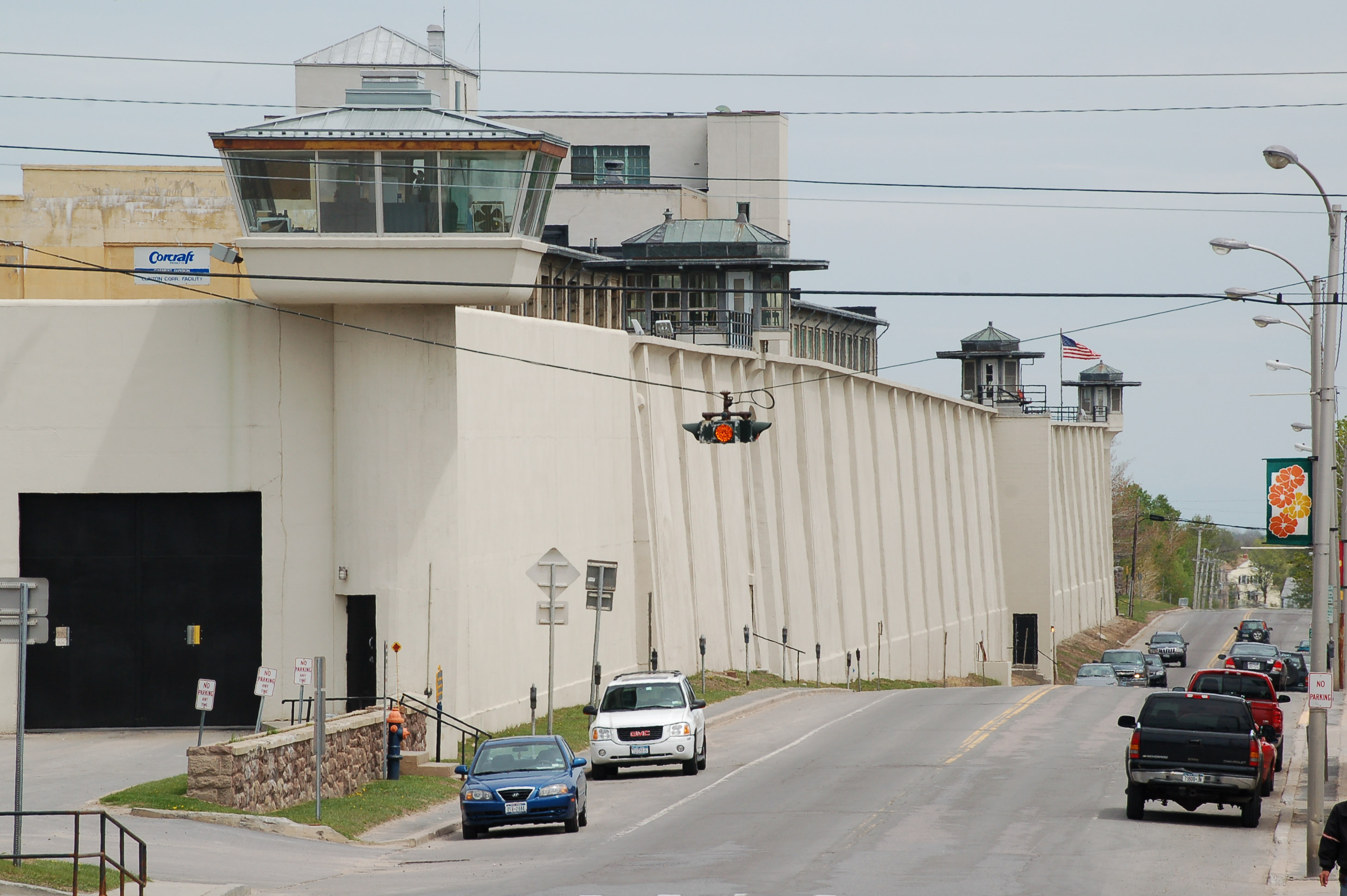
Southern perimeter wall, 2007

In 1929, Clinton Correctional was the site of a riot. Coupled with riots in other prisons in that year, it led to prison reform in New York. Included was the construction of schools in the prison and the renovation or rebuilding of most of the structures within the prison walls to update the facilities to modern standards.

The Church of St. Dismas, the Good Thief was built from 1939 to 1941. It was added to the National Register of Historic Places in 1991 as a significant structure. In the later half of the 20th century, the prison's mental institutions closed and were converted into an annex to house more prisoners.

On June 6, 2015, inmates Richard Matt and David Sweat, both serving sentences for murder, escaped from the facility. Two prison employees, Joyce Mitchell and Gene Palmer, were charged with aiding the escape. During the search, on June 26, Matt was shot and killed by a Border Patrol agent in the town of Malone, New York. Two days later, Sweat was shot by New York state trooper Jay Cook, and subsequently captured. In the days after the escape, some prisoners reported having been beaten by guards in an attempt to obtain information as to the whereabouts and plans of the escaped inmates.

== Notable inmates ==
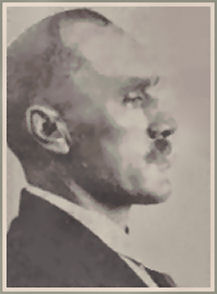
Carl Panzram Clinton Prison 1923

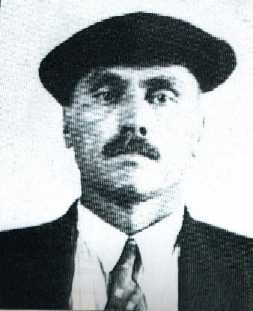
Carl Panzram aka John O'Leary Clinton Prison 1923
- George Appo: A 19th-century pickpocket and con artist, his biographer provides a description of 19th-century prison conditions in New York.
- David Berkowitz also known as the Son of Sam and the .44 Caliber Killer, is an American serial killer who pleaded guilty to eight shootings that began in New York City on July 29, 1976.
- David Bullock: Serial killer, 1981–1982
- Robert Chambers: The "preppy murderer", he served much of his sentence at Clinton Correctional Facility for the manslaughter conviction of Jennifer Levin, as well as a later sentence for drug possession after heroin was found in his cell and new criminal charges were brought.
- Gregory Corso: An Italian-American poet, he was one of the inner circle of "the Beat Generation" along with Kerouac, Ginsberg, and Burroughs. Sentenced at 17, Corso served about three years for stealing a suit.
- Jesse Friedman: One of the subjects of the 2003 documentary film, Capturing the Friedmans, he pleaded guilty to sodomy and sexual abuse charges related to child molestation in the 1980s.
- Robert Garrow: A serial rapist/murderer, he served twice at Clinton Correctional - 1961–1963 for rape (transferred to Auburn Correctional Facility), and 1974–1977 for second-degree murder (transferred to Auburn Correctional Facility, followed by transfer to Fishkill Correctional Facility in 1978).
- Victor Joseph Gatto: An Italian-American primitive painter, who served time for a robbery he did not commit.
- Paul Geidel: A murderer, he was the longest-serving prisoner in American history whose sentence ended with release. He was transferred to Fishkill Correctional Facility in 1972.
- David Gilbert: Serving life in prison, he was arrested with members of the Black Liberation Army and other radicals following a botched Brinks armored-car robbery in 1981; he was paroled in 2021.
- Miss Major Griffin-Gracy: Involved in trans activism until her death in 2025, she was convicted and sentenced to 5 years in 1970 for robbery.
- Rex Heuermann: Perpetrator of the Gilgo Beach serial killings, pleaded guilty to seven murders and admitted to committing an eighth, he was sentenced to life in prison without the possibility of parole in 2026.
- Nauman Hussain: Convicted of manslaughter and sentenced to 5 to 15 years for his role in the 2018 Schoharie limousine crash. He was transferred to Attica Correctional Facility.
- John Jamelske: A mass kidnapper and serial rapist, he is serving 18 years to life.
- Marlon Legere: He is serving life without parole in connection with the shooting deaths of NYPD detectives Robert Parker and Patrick Rafferty in Brooklyn.
- Shyne (Moses Michael Levi): Beginning in 2001, he served a sentence of 8 to 10 years on convictions of assault, criminal weapons possession, and reckless endangerment. He was released and deported back to his native Belize.
- Charles "Lucky" Luciano: One of the driving forces behind the development of Italian organized crime in the United States, he served 10 years of a 30- to 50-year sentence for running a prostitution ring before being deported to Italy after World War II.
- Richard Matt: A murderer, he escaped with David Sweat, and was shot dead by police in June 2015 while he was still at large.
- James Harris Jackson: Perpetrator of the 2017 Murder of Timothy Caughman.
- Carl Paivio: A Finnish-American labor activist and anarchist, he was sentenced to 4 to 8 years in 1919 for "criminal anarchy".
- Carl Panzram: Serial killer, 1923–1928
- Daniel Pelosi: Convicted of murdering Ted Ammon and jury tampering
- Bobby Shmurda (Ackquille Pollard): A rapper who made the 2014 hit "Hot N*gga", he served his sentence for gang-related activity since 2016; he was moved from Rikers Island to Dannemora in 2017.
- Christopher Porco: Serving 50 years to life, he was convicted for the 2004 ax murder of his father and attempted murder of his mother in their Delmar, New York, home.
- Joel Rifkin: He was referred to as "Joel the Ripper" by tabloids after a five-year killing spree. He murdered 17 women, and is serving 203 years to life.
- Altemio Sanchez (also known as the Bike Path Rapist): An American serial killer, he murdered at least three women and raped at least 14 others in and around Buffalo, New York, over a span of 25 years (1981–2006).
- Renato Seabra: sentenced to 25 years to life for murdering and castrating Portuguese journalist Carlos Castro.
- Heriberto Seda: Also known as "The New York Zodiac" or "The Brooklyn Sniper". He was convicted of murdering three people and attempting to murder another six people.
- Tupac Shakur: served 7 months on a sexual-abuse conviction from March to October 1995 before being released on appeal. Shakur mentioned the facility in his 1996 song "Picture me Rollin.'"
- Eric Smith: He was convicted of killing and sexually assaulting a four-year-old boy named Derrick Robie at age 13.
- Willie Sutton: A bank robber, he was imprisoned at Dannemora in the 1920s.
- Martin Tankleff: A former Belle Terre, New York, resident, he was freed after his conviction for killing his wealthy parents Arlene and Seymour Tankleff was overturned citing evidence that others committed the murders.
- Leslie Torres: A teenaged spree killer, he shot five people to death in East Harlem during an eight-day robbery spree in 1988. He was sentenced to life imprisonment with parole after serving 60 years.

== See also ==
- List of New York state prisons
