= Joe Gatto (disambiguation) =

Joe Gatto (born 1976) is an American comedian.

Joe Gatto may also refer to:

- Joe Gatto (artist) (1893–1965), American artist
- Joe Gatto (baseball) (born 1995), American professional baseball pitcher
