= Victor Joseph Gatto =

American artist (1893-1965)

Victor Joseph Gatto (born July 23, 1893 New York City, died May 25, 1965 Miami) was an American primitive artist. Most of his work depicts daily life in New York, biblical scenes, or wildlife. He was most active in the 1940s and 1950s. His work has been compared to that of Henri Rousseau.

== Early life ==
Gatto was born in New York City on July 23, 1893, to an Italian-American family. His early life was marked by hardship. Gatto lived with his parents and four brothers in a Little Italy tenement until his mother died when he was 4. Gatto's father, a blue collar laborer, surrendered the children to an orphanage until he remarried four years later.

Gatto dropped out of school after fifth grade to enter the workforce, working odd jobs to help his family. In 1913, he became a professional boxer. Over the next 6 years, he had more than 30 fights in the featherweight class.

One of Gatto's brothers, John, was involved with the mob. As a consequence, Gatto was wrongfully imprisoned for a robbery he did not commit. He was sentenced to Dannemora prison, which he tried twice to escape during his term. In World War II, he served as a steamfitter until a hernia prevented him from working.

== Artistic career ==
Gatto, who was entirely self-taught, began painting in 1938 at the age of 45 after hearing that artists in New York could make good money. He began with a simple setup, using an old plate as a palette and the back of a chair as an easel. Elaine and Willem de Kooning, who were neighbors of Gatto, encouraged him to pursue painting. By 1940, he had gained popularity among collectors of modern primitive art. His work is characterized by great attention to detail and minute, layered brushstrokes. He would reportedly spend as much as 18 months on a single painting.

In 1943, the Charles Barzansky Gallery hosted a one-man show in his honor, garnering widespread praise. Gatto became a favorite of art collectors, who referred to him as "New York's Rousseau." A number of magazine pieces were written on him, and his work twice graced the cover of Town and Country. Despite his critical success and popularity among collectors, Gatto had little business acumen and struggled financially. He continued to work odd jobs for the rest of his life. His painting slowed in the late 1950s, and by 1960, his health was failing him. He died in Miami, Florida, a vacation spot throughout his life in which he settled in his final years, on May 25, 1965.

Gatto's work focused on religious and historical themes. He painted a number of biblical scenes, as well as ones from his own memory; at 18, Gatto witnessed the Triangle Shirtwaist Factory, which he recreated more than 30 years later in Triangle Fire, March 25, 1911.

== Major works ==
- Suffering Christ
- Triangle Fire, March 25, 1911
- Biblical Landscape with Adam and Eve
- The Bathers
- Georgia
