= Church of St. Dismas, the Good Thief =

Historic church in New York, United States

- U.S. National Register of Historic Places
- Location within New York Location within the United States
- Location: Clinton Correctional Facility, Cook St., Dannemora, New York
- Coordinates: 44°43′29″N 73°43′21″W
- Area: 1.1 acres (0.45 ha)
- Built: 1941
- Architect: Frederick V. Murphy
- Architectural style: Neogothic
- NRHP reference No.: 91001673
- Added to NRHP: November 21, 1991

Church of St. Dismas, the Good Thief is a historic Roman Catholic church at the Clinton Correctional Facility on Cook Street in Dannemora, New York.

== Description ==
St. Dismas Church was built between 1939 and 1941 and is a large Neogothic inspired stone chapel. It was constructed of fieldstones salvaged from several 19th-century stone structures already on the site, including the prison's first cell block. The rectangular building measures 52 feet (16 m) by 132 feet (40 m). It features a steeply pitched, slate-clad gable roof and two massive oak entrance doors with Medieval inspired metal strapwork. A 106-foot (32 m) engaged tower with corner buttresses and an octagonal spire is located at the rear corner.

It was added to the National Register of Historic Places in 1991.
