= Dannemora (village), New York =

Dannemora, New York
- Location in Clinton County and the state of New York.
- Coordinates: 44°43′15″N 73°43′8″W
- Country: United States
- State: New York
- County: Clinton
- Towns: Dannemora, Saranac

Area
  - Total: 1.21 sq mi (3.13 km^{2})
  - Land: 1.21 sq mi (3.13 km^{2})
  - Water: 0 sq mi (0.00 km^{2})
- Elevation: 1,414 ft (431 m)

Population (2020)
  - Total: 3,287
  - Density: 2,722/sq mi (1,051.1/km^{2})
- Time zone: UTC-5 (Eastern (EST))
  - Summer (DST): UTC-4 (EDT)
- ZIP code: 12929
- Area code: 518
- FIPS code: 36-19642
- GNIS feature ID: 0948021
- Website: www.villageofdannemora.gov

Dannemora is a village located in the towns of Dannemora and Saranac in Clinton County, New York, United States. It is best known as the location for Clinton Correctional Facility, also known colloquially as Dannemora. The population was 3,936 (approximately 2,800 to 3,000 of this number are prison inmates) at the 2010 census. The village is named after Dannemora, Sweden, an iron-making town from where early settlers of this area had emigrated.

The northern half of the village is in the town of Dannemora, while the southern half is in the town of Saranac. The ZIP code is 12929.

Primary and secondary education is provided by the Saranac Central School District.

== History ==
The village of Dannemora was incorporated in 1901. Permanent settlement had begun in 1838. The early economy was based on mining and smelting iron, but this industry did not become significant until approximately 1843.

Clinton Prison (now known as the Clinton Correctional Facility) was opened in 1845 to employ convicts to work in the iron industry. In the 21st century, it is classified as a maximum security facility. It houses long-term prisoners and is one of the largest prisons in the state. It is located in the northern portion of the village.

From 1900 to 1972, Dannemora also contained the Dannemora Hospital for the Criminally mentally ill. After its closure, this facility was used for a variety of prison programs by the Department of Corrections. As a result, Dannemora has become a synonym among many in the state for the place where many of its criminally insane are confined.

== Geography ==
Dannemora is located at 44°43′15″N 73°43′8″W (44.720878, -73.718904).

According to the United States Census Bureau, the village has a total area of 1.2 square miles (3.0 km^{2}), all land.

The entire village of Dannemora is located within the boundary of Adirondack Park. However, the town of Dannemora is excluded from the park by statute. This means that the portion of the village lying within the town of Dannemora, including the Clinton Correctional Facility, is outside Adirondack Park, while the portion inside the town of Saranac is included in the park.

New York State Route 374, an east-west highway, passes through the village as Cook Street.

== Demographics ==
Historical population
Census	Pop.	Note	%±
1880	577		—
1910	1,146		—
1920	2,623		128.9%
1930	3,348		27.6%
1940	4,830		44.3%
1950	4,122		−14.7%
1960	4,835		17.3%
1970	3,735		−22.8%
1980	3,770		0.9%
1990	4,005		6.2%
2000	4,129		3.1%
2010	3,936		−4.7%
2020	3,287		−16.5%
U.S. Decennial Census

As of the census of 2000, there were 4,129 people, 469 households, and 326 families residing in the village. The population density was 3,423.2 inhabitants per square mile (1,321.7/km^{2}). There were 516 housing units at an average density of 427.8 per square mile (165.2/km^{2}). The racial makeup of the village was 49.07% White, 37.95% Black or African American, 0.56% Native American, 0.97% Asian, 10.49% from other races, and 0.97% from two or more races. Hispanic or Latino of any race were 18.65% of the population.

There were 469 households, out of which 35.4% had children under the age of 18 living with them, 48.6% were married couples living together, 15.4% had a female householder with no husband present, and 30.3% were non-families. 23.0% of all households were made up of individuals, and 10.7% had someone living alone who was 65 years of age or older. The average household size was 2.62 and the average family size was 3.03.

In the village, the population was spread out, with 8.9% under the age of 18, 12.6% from 18 to 24, 58.2% from 25 to 44, 16.1% from 45 to 64, and 4.1% who were 65 years of age or older. The median age was 34 years. For every 100 females, there were 525.6 males. For every 100 females age 18 and over, there were 682.1 males.

The median income for a household in the village was $42,500, and the median income for a family was $47,019. Males had a median income of $24,753 versus $24,286 for females. The per capita income for the village was $18,872. About 13.5% of families and 14.5% of the population were below the poverty line, including 28.1% of those under age 18 and 4.1% of those age 65 or over.

Note: The census counts prisoners as part of the jurisdictions where they are incarcerated. With the all-male state prison in Dannemora, the ethnicity and gender data for the village is different from that of the general village population and the population of neighboring non-prison towns, because a disproportionate percentage of the prison population is male and black or Hispanic. Household and family statistics, however, do not include the prison population.

== Notable people ==
- Robert Garrow (1936–1978), spree killer
