= Colombo crime family =

Organized crime family in New York City

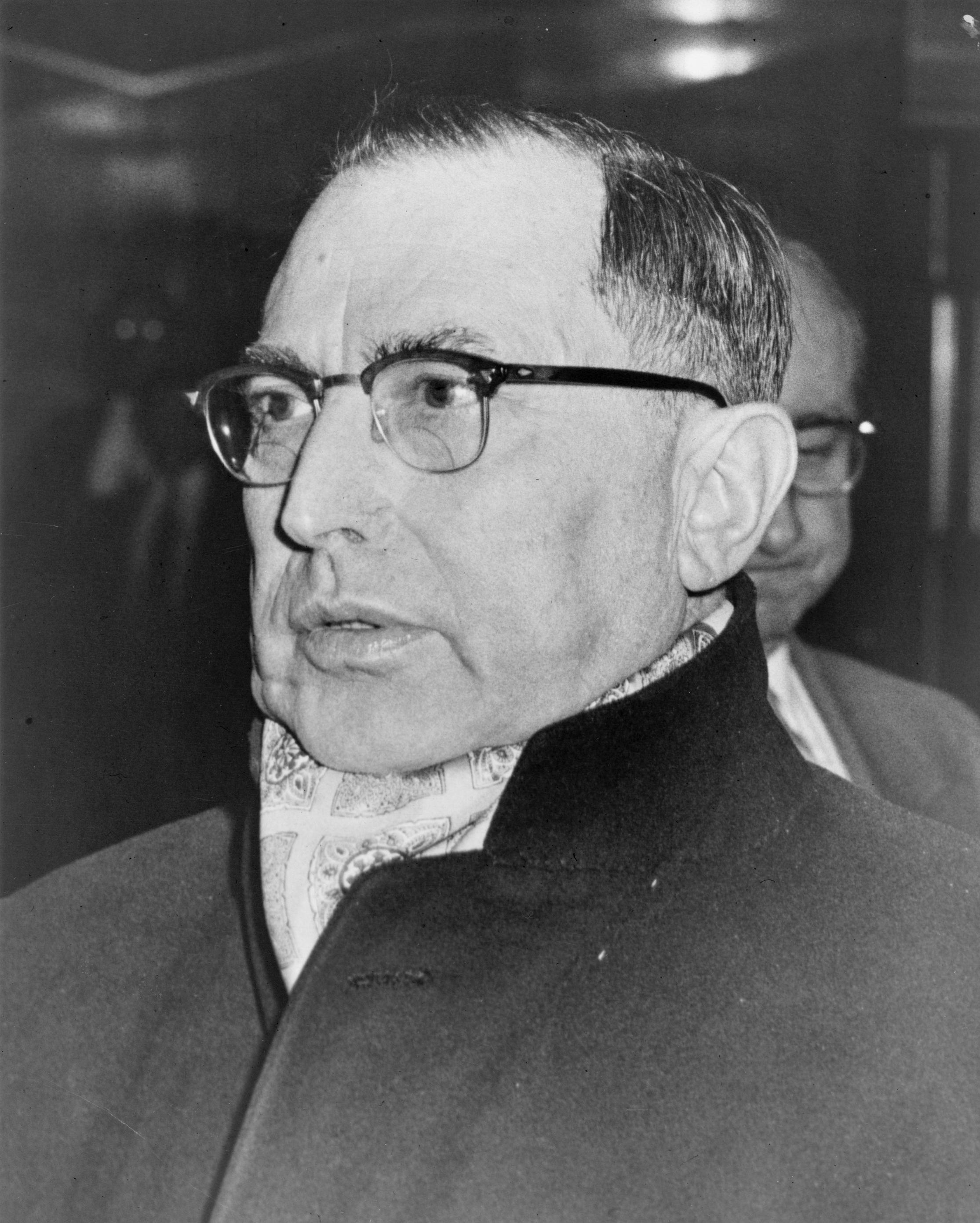
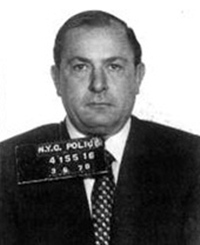
- Joe Profaci Joseph Colombo Carmine Persico
- Founded: 1928; 98 years ago
- Founder: Joe Profaci
- Named after: Joseph Colombo
- Founding location: New York City, New York, United States
- Years active: 1928–present
- Territory: Primarily the New York metropolitan area, including Long Island and New Jersey, with additional territory in Boston and New Haven, as well as Las Vegas, Los Angeles and South Florida
- Ethnicity: Italians as "made men" and other ethnicities as associates
- Membership (est.): 140 made members (1973); 120 made members and 450+ associates (1990); 110 made members and 500 associates (2004); 90 made members (2021)
- Activities: Racketeering, gambling, loansharking, extortion, labor racketeering, drug trafficking, cigarette smuggling, arms trafficking, robbery, truck hijacking, burglary, theft, auto theft, fencing, fraud, skimming, tax evasion, money laundering, bribery, counterfeiting, pornography, prostitution, arson, assault, and murder
- Allies: Bonanno crime family; Bufalino crime family; Buffalo crime family; Chicago Outfit; DeCavalcante crime family; Detroit Partnership; Gambino crime family; Genovese crime family; Los Angeles crime family; Lucchese crime family; Patriarca crime family; South Brooklyn Boys
- Rivals: Various gangs in New York City, including their allies

The Colombo crime family (/kəˈlɒmboʊ/; Italian: [koˈlombo]) is an Italian American Mafia crime family and one of the "Five Families" that dominate organized crime in New York City within the criminal organization known as the American Mafia. The Colombo family is the youngest of the Five Families, and has a history of instability and infighting, having been fractured by three internal wars.

The Colombo family traces its roots to a bootlegging gang formed by Joe Profaci in 1928. It was during Lucky Luciano's organization of the Commission after the Castellammarese War, following the assassinations of "Joe the Boss" Masseria and Salvatore Maranzano in 1931, that the gang run by Profaci became recognized as the Profaci crime family. Profaci ruled his family without disruption until the late 1950s, when caporegime Joe Gallo attempted a revolt, but the conflict lost momentum when Gallo was sent to prison in 1961. Following Profaci's death in 1962, his brother-in-law, Joseph Magliocco, succeeded him as boss. Magliocco joined a plot by Bonanno family boss Joseph Bonanno to assassinate the three other bosses on the Commission to take control of the New York Mafia. The coup attempt failed when Joseph Colombo, the hit man assigned by Magliocco to kill his rivals, reported the plot to the Commission. Magliocco was forced into exile, and Colombo was rewarded for his fealty to the Commission with the leadership of the family.

Colombo founded the Italian-American Civil Rights League (IACRL), using the organization to protest against federal law enforcement efforts targeting the Mafia, which he characterized as anti-Italianism. In 1971, Colombo was shot by a lone gunman during an IACRL rally at Columbus Circle, leaving him paralyzed until his eventual death in 1978. Colombo's shooting left a power vacuum in the family, leading to a second internal war erupting after Gallo was released from prison. Gallo was gunned down at Umberto's Clam House in 1972, and Colombo supporters led by Carmine Persico eventually won the second war after the exiling of the remaining Gallo crew to the Genovese family in 1975. The Colombo family was weakened, however, due to the poor leadership of a series of acting bosses, including Vincenzo Aloi and Thomas DiBella, until Persico took over the family after Colombo's death. Persico returned the family to prominence until he and other senior members of the organization were imprisoned in 1986 following a series of racketeering convictions, decimating the family's hierarchy.

Following the prosecutions which imprisoned the Colombo family's leadership, Persico named Victor Orena as the family's acting boss in 1989. In 1991, the third and bloodiest war erupted when Orena tried to seize power from the imprisoned Persico. The family split into two factions, resulting in two years of mayhem. The third war ended in 1993, with twelve members of the family dead and Orena imprisoned, leaving Persico the victor. Left with a family decimated by war, Persico continued to run the family until his death in prison in 2019, but the organization has never recovered. In the 2000s, the family was further weakened by multiple convictions in federal racketeering cases and numerous members deciding to turn state's evidence. As of 2011, many law enforcement agencies consider the Colombo family to be the weakest of the Five Families.

== History ==
=== Origins ===
In September 1921, Joseph Profaci arrived in New York City from Villabate, Sicily, Italy. After struggles with entering the legitimate business community in Chicago, Profaci moved back to Brooklyn in 1925 and became a well-known olive oil importer. On September 27, Profaci obtained his American citizenship. With his importing business doing well, Profaci made deals with friends from his hometown in Sicily, and one of his largest buyers was Tampa mobster Ignazio Italiano.

Profaci controlled a small criminal gang that operated mainly in Brooklyn. The dominant Cosa Nostra groups in that area were led by Frankie Yale, Joe Masseria, Nicolo Schirò and capo di tutti capi ("boss of bosses") Salvatore "Toto" D'Aquila.

On July 1, 1928, Yale was murdered by hit men working for Chicago Outfit boss Al Capone. Yale had been murdered in retaliation for refusing to give Capone, a Neapolitan, control over the Unione Siciliana fraternal association. The killing allowed Profaci and his brother-in-law, Joseph Magliocco, to gain territory for their small gang, including territory in Bensonhurst, Bay Ridge, Red Hook and Carroll Gardens, while the rest of Yale's group went to the Masseria family.

On October 10, 1928, D'Aquila was assassinated, resulting in a fight for his territory. To prevent a gang war in Brooklyn, a meeting was called on December 5 at the Statler Hotel in Cleveland, Ohio, which was considered neutral territory under the protection and control of the Porrello crime family. Attendees representing Brooklyn included Profaci, Magliocco, Vincent Mangano (who reported to D'Aquila family boss Manfredi Mineo), Joseph Bonanno (who represented Salvatore Maranzano and the Castellammarese clan), Ignazio Italiano (Tampa, Florida) and Chicago mobsters Joseph Guinta and Pasquale Lolordo. At the end of the meeting, Profaci received a share of D'Aquila's Brooklyn territory, with Magliocco as his second-in-command.

=== The Castellammarese War ===
Months after the D'Aquila murder, Masseria began a campaign to become capo di tutti capi in the United States, demanding tribute from the remaining three Mafia groups in New York, including the Profaci family, the Castellammarese clan and the Reina family. Castellammarese boss Maranzano began his own campaign to become "boss of bosses", which started the Castellammarese War.

Masseria, along with his ally Manfredi Mineo, the new boss of the D'Aquila family, ordered the murder of Gaetano Reina, whom he believed to have sided with Maranzano. Following Reina's murder on February 26, 1930, Masseria appointed Joseph Pinzolo as the new boss of the Reina family. Profaci maintained a neutral stance, secretly supporting Maranzano. The war ended when Charles "Lucky" Luciano, a Masseria lieutenant, betrayed him to Maranzano by setting up Masseria's murder on April 15, 1931. Maranzano then declared himself the new capo di tutti capi in the United States.

Within a few months, Maranzano and Luciano were plotting to kill each other. On September 10, 1931, Luciano had Maranzano killed. Rather than claim the title of capo di tutti capi for himself, Luciano retired the title and instead created the Commission, the American Mafia's governing body. This established five independent Cosa Nostra families in New York City and twenty-one additional families across the U.S., all of whom fell under the Commission's authority. Profaci and Magliocco were confirmed as boss and underboss, respectively, of what was now known as the Profaci crime family.

=== First Family War (1960–1963) ===
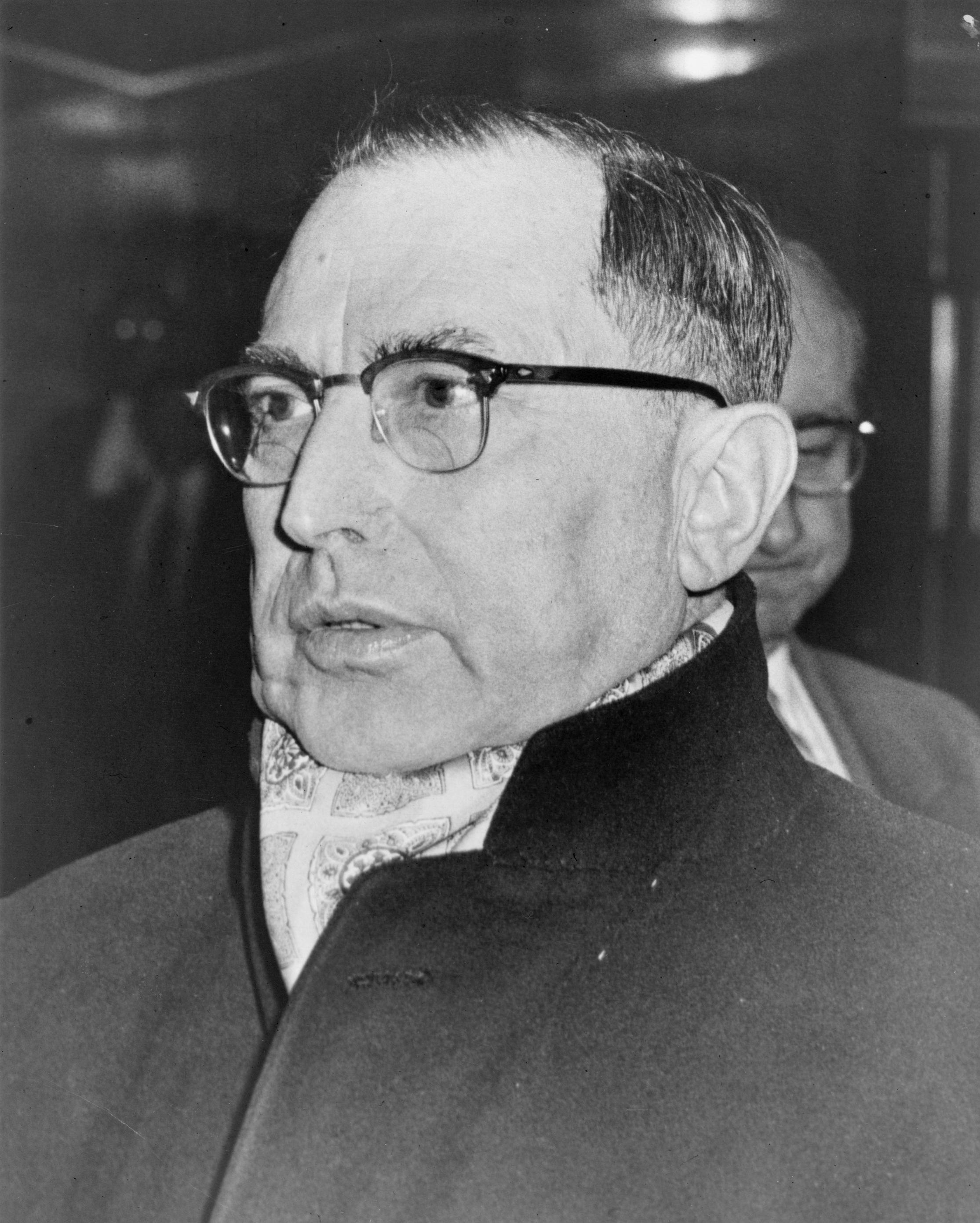
Joseph Profaci in 1959

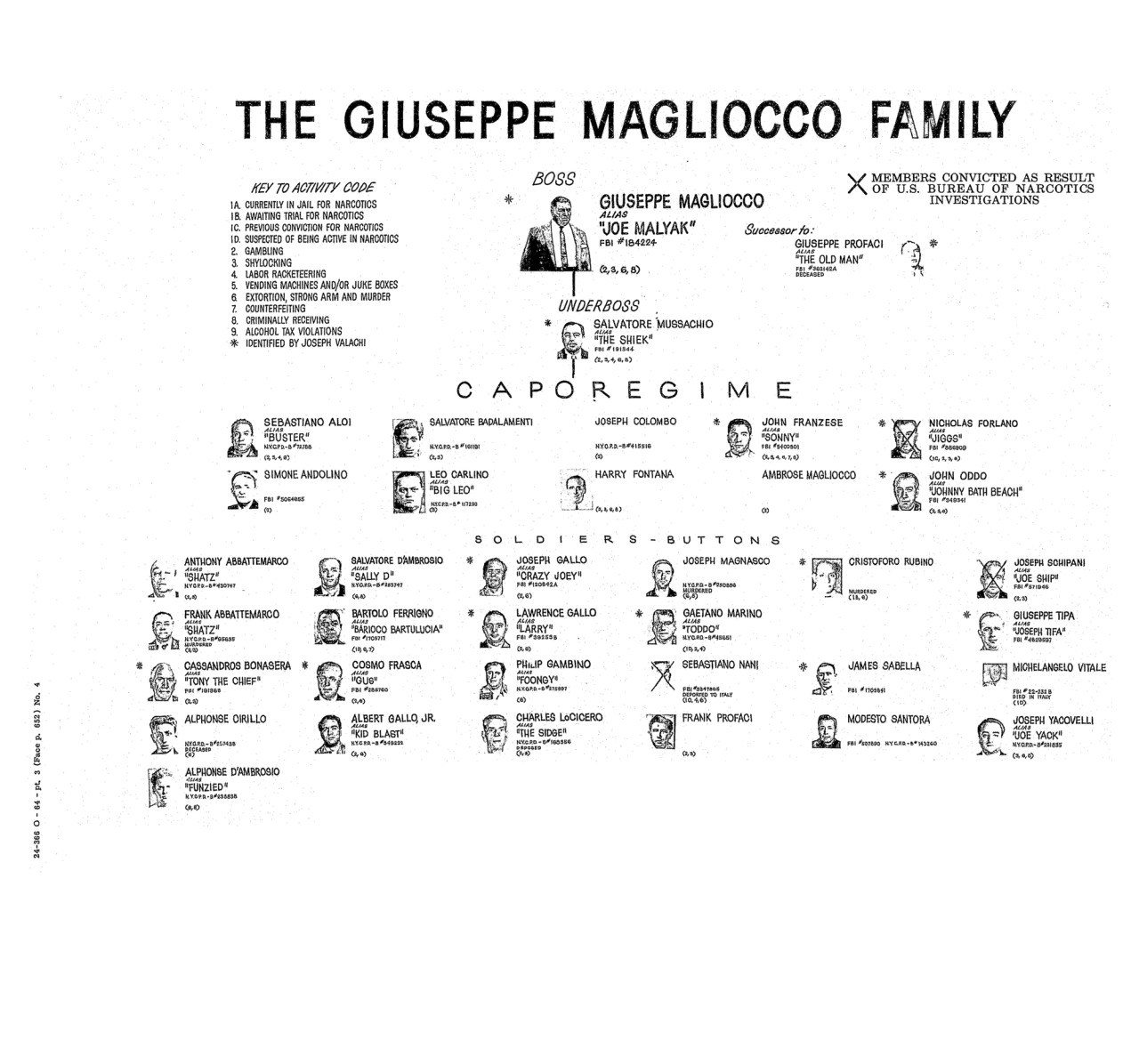
An FBI chart of the Magliocco family hierarchy in 1963

Profaci had become a wealthy Mafia boss and was known as "the olive-oil and tomato paste king of America". One of his most unpopular demands was a $25 monthly tribute from every soldier in his family. In the late 1950s, Frank "Frankie Shots" Abbatemarco, a caporegime (captain, or head of a "crew") under Profaci, became a chafed at the boss' tribute. Abbatemarco controlled a lucrative policy game that earned him nearly $2.5 million a year with an average of $7,000 a day in Red Hook. In early 1959, Abbatemarco, with the support of the Gallo brothers and Carmine Persico's Garfield Boys, began refusing to pay the tribute.

By late 1959, Abbatemarco's debt had grown to $50,000. Profaci allegedly ordered Joe Gallo to murder Abbatemarco in exchange for control over Abbatemarco's policy game. Other versions of the story indicate that Gallo played no part in Abbatemarco's murder.

On November 4, 1959, as Abbatemarco walked out of his cousin's bar in Park Slope, he was shot and killed by Joseph Gioielli and another hit man. Profaci then ordered the Gallo brothers to hand over Abbatemarco's son Anthony. When the Gallos refused, Profaci refused to give them the policy game. This marked the start of the first war within the family, putting the Gallo brothers and the Garfield Boys against Profaci and his loyalists.

On February 27, 1961, the Gallos kidnapped four of Profaci's top men: underboss Magliocco, Profaci's brother Frank, capo Salvatore Musacchia and soldier John Scimone. Profaci himself eluded capture and flew to sanctuary in Florida. While holding the hostages, Larry and Albert Gallo sent their brother Joe to California. Profaci's consigliere, Charles "the Sidge" LoCicero, negotiated with the Gallos and all the hostages were released peacefully.

Profaci had no intention of honoring this peace agreement. On August 20, 1961, he ordered the murders of Larry Gallo and Gallo loyalist Gioielli. Gunmen allegedly murdered Gioielli after inviting him to go deep sea fishing. Larry Gallo survived a strangulation attempt by Persico and Salvatore "Sally" D'Ambrosio at the Sahara Club in East Flatbush after a passing police officer intervened. Persico's betrayal of the Gallos earned him the nickname "The Snake". The war continued, resulting in nine murders and three disappearances.

In late November 1961, Joe Gallo was sentenced to seven to fourteen years in prison for murder. The next June, Profaci died of cancer, leaving longtime underboss Magliocco as the new boss. The war continued on between the two factions. In 1963, Persico survived a car bombing and his enforcer Hugh McIntosh was shot in the groin as he attempted to kill Larry Gallo. On May 19, 1963, a Gallo hit team shot Persico multiple times, but he survived.

In 1963, Joseph Bonanno, the head of the Bonanno crime family, made plans to assassinate several rivals on the Mafia Commission—bosses Tommy Lucchese, Carlo Gambino and Stefano Magaddino, as well as Frank DeSimone. Bonanno sought Magliocco's support, and Magliocco readily agreed. Not only was he bitter due to being denied a seat on the Commission, but Bonanno and Profaci had been close allies for over thirty years prior to Profaci's death.

Bonanno's audacious goal was to take over the Commission and make Magliocco his right-hand man. Magliocco, assigned the task of killing Lucchese and Gambino, gave the contract to one of his top hit men, Joseph Colombo. However, the opportunistic Colombo revealed the plot to its targets. Realizing that Magliocco could not have planned the hits himself, and knowing of the close ties between Bonanno and Magliocco, and before him, Profaci, the other bosses concluded Bonanno was the real mastermind.

The Commission summoned Bonanno and Magliocco to explain themselves. Fearing for his life, Bonanno went into hiding in Montreal, leaving Magliocco to deal with the fallout. Badly shaken and in failing health, Magliocco confessed his role in the plot. The Commission spared Magliocco's life but forced him to relinquish leadership of the Profaci family and pay a $50,000 fine. As a reward for his fealty to the Commission, Colombo was awarded control of the family.

=== Colombo and Italian American Civil Rights League ===
At age 41, Joseph Colombo was the youngest boss in New York at the time, and the first New York Mafia boss to have been born and raised in the U.S. Having risen to the top of the family at such a young age, Colombo knew that he had a potentially long reign ahead of him. He also knew that if he managed to outlive the other bosses, he could become not only the most powerful boss in New York but the most powerful boss in the country as well.

Therefore, Colombo set about reshuffling the family's ranks, placing old-time gangsters in greater positions of power than the younger, more ambitious ones who could have potentially posed a threat to his rule. He promoted elderly mobsters Salvatore "Charlie Lemons" Mineo and Benedetto D'Alessandro to underboss and consigliere, respectively. In doing so, Colombo also sought to stabilize the family after enduring such a tumultuous period of conflict. When D’Alessandro later retired in 1969, Colombo promoted Joseph "Joey Yack" Yacovelli to consigliere.

Along with former Gallo crew member Nicholas Bianco and New England family boss Raymond Patriarca, Colombo was also able to finally end the war with the Gallos. As a reward for his loyalty, Bianco was inducted into the Colombo family. In 1968, Larry Gallo died of cancer.

As boss, Colombo brought peace and stability to the broken crime family. However, some Cosa Nostra bosses viewed Colombo as a "puppet boss" to Gambino family boss Carlo Gambino and felt he never deserved the title. Colombo's leadership was never challenged, however, due to Gambino's support.

In April 1970, Colombo established the Italian-American Civil Rights League (IACRL), purportedly dedicated to fighting discrimination against Italian-Americans but mostly used as a vehicle by Colombo to smear federal investigations into organized crime. Many mobsters disapproved of the IACRL, feeling it brought unwanted public attention to Cosa Nostra. Colombo ignored their concerns and continued gaining support for his league.

On June 29, 1970, Colombo held the first rally for the IACRL. In 1971, the other New York bosses ordered their men to stay away from the scheduled second demonstration and not support Colombo's cause. In a sign that the bosses had turned on Colombo, the IACRL's chief organizer, Gambino family capo Joseph DeCicco, resigned, ostensibly due to ill health.

In 1971, Joe Gallo was also released from prison. At the time of his release, Gallo said the 1963 peace agreement did not apply to him because he was in prison when it was negotiated. As a supposedly conciliatory gesture, Colombo invited Gallo to a peace meeting with an offering of $1,000. Gallo refused the invitation, demanding $100,000 to stop the conflict, which Colombo rejected, instigating the family's second internal war. At that point, Colombo issued a new order to kill Gallo.

=== Second Family War (1971–1975) ===
On June 28, 1971, Colombo held the second rally of the IACRL at Columbus Circle in Manhattan. As he prepared to speak, Jerome A. Johnson walked up to Colombo and shot him in the back of the head three times; seconds later, Colombo's bodyguards shot Johnson to death. The shooting did not kill Colombo but left him paralyzed for the last seven years of his life; he died of natural causes on May 22, 1978. Although many in the Colombo family blamed Gallo for the shooting, the police eventually concluded that Johnson was a lone gunman after they had questioned Gallo.

Shortly after the Colombo shooting, a meeting of the high-ranking members of the family was held. At the meeting, underboss Mineo was asked to take over as interim boss. Mineo refused, citing his advanced age and failing health, and instead recommended that consigliere Yacovelli become acting boss.

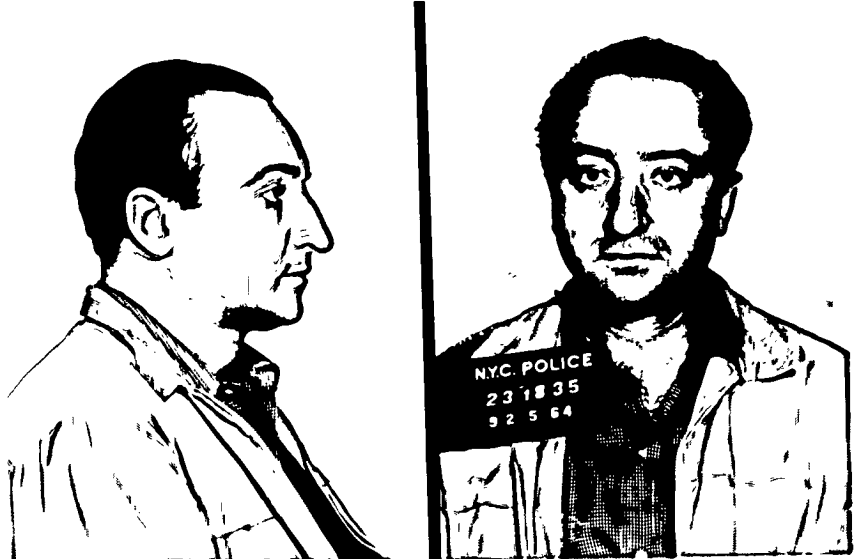
A mugshot of Joseph Yacovelli from the New York City Police Department, entered into his FBI file in 1965.

Although the leadership of the Colombo family believed that Gallo was the mastermind behind the attempt on Colombo's life, Yacovelli opted not to pursue vengeance against Gallo right away. The New York Police Department (NYPD) may have contributed to Yacovelli's hesitation; although police believed that Gallo was not involved in the Colombo shooting, they were aware that many members of the Colombo family did and would likely attempt to take revenge. Therefore, the NYPD assigned officers to follow Gallo and ensure he was not harmed, making it nearly impossible for the Colombo family to get to him. Killing Gallo so soon after the attempt on Colombo would also likely give police the impression that a full-scale mob war was ensuing and would therefore draw too much heat.

By early 1972, most of the publicity surrounding the Colombo shooting had faded away, and an open contract was placed on Gallo's head. On April 7, acting on a tip, four gunmen walked into Umberto's Clam House in Little Italy and killed Gallo as he was dining with his family. Looking for revenge, Gallo's brother Albert sent a gunman from Las Vegas to the Neapolitan Noodle restaurant in Manhattan, where Yacovelli, Alphonse Persico and Gennaro Langella were dining. The gunman did not recognize the mobsters and shot four innocent diners instead, killing two of them.

After this assassination attempt, Yacovelli, fearing further attempts at reprisal from the Gallo crew, fled New York. With Yacovelli now on the run and Mineo, the family's underboss, having previously made it clear that he had no interest in controlling the family, the door appeared to be wide open for Persico, now a powerful caporegime, to permanently take over as boss. Perisco had been sent to federal prison on hijacking charges in January 1972, so another capo named Vincenzo Aloi, the son of well-respected former capo Sebastiano "Buster" Aloi as well as Carlo Gambino's godson, became the new acting boss. Aloi's tenure was to be short-lived, as he was convicted of perjury on June 26, 1973. After his conviction, Aloi, who was free on bail pending an appeal, stepped down as acting boss.

Joseph "Joey" Brancato, acting capo for John "Sonny" Franzese while Franzese was serving a fifty-year federal sentence for bank robbery, became acting boss. Brancato had no interest in a permanent leadership position and only took the job for the purpose of finally negotiating an end to the war with the Gallo crew, which by then had split itself into two groups that had started fighting each other. To resolve the conflict, Brancato and the bosses of the other Five Families negotiated an agreement in which Albert Gallo and his remaining crew left the Colombo family and peacefully joined the Genovese family.

Having successfully negotiated a peaceful resolution to the Gallo wars, Brancato stepped down as acting boss and returned to running his Long Island crew. With no other viable candidates standing in his way, the imprisoned Persico officially took over the Colombo family by the end of 1973, placing Thomas DiBella in charge of the family as acting boss and promoting his brother Alphonse "Allie Boy" Persico to consigliere and Anthony "Tony Shots" Abbatemarco to underboss.

=== The family under Persico ===
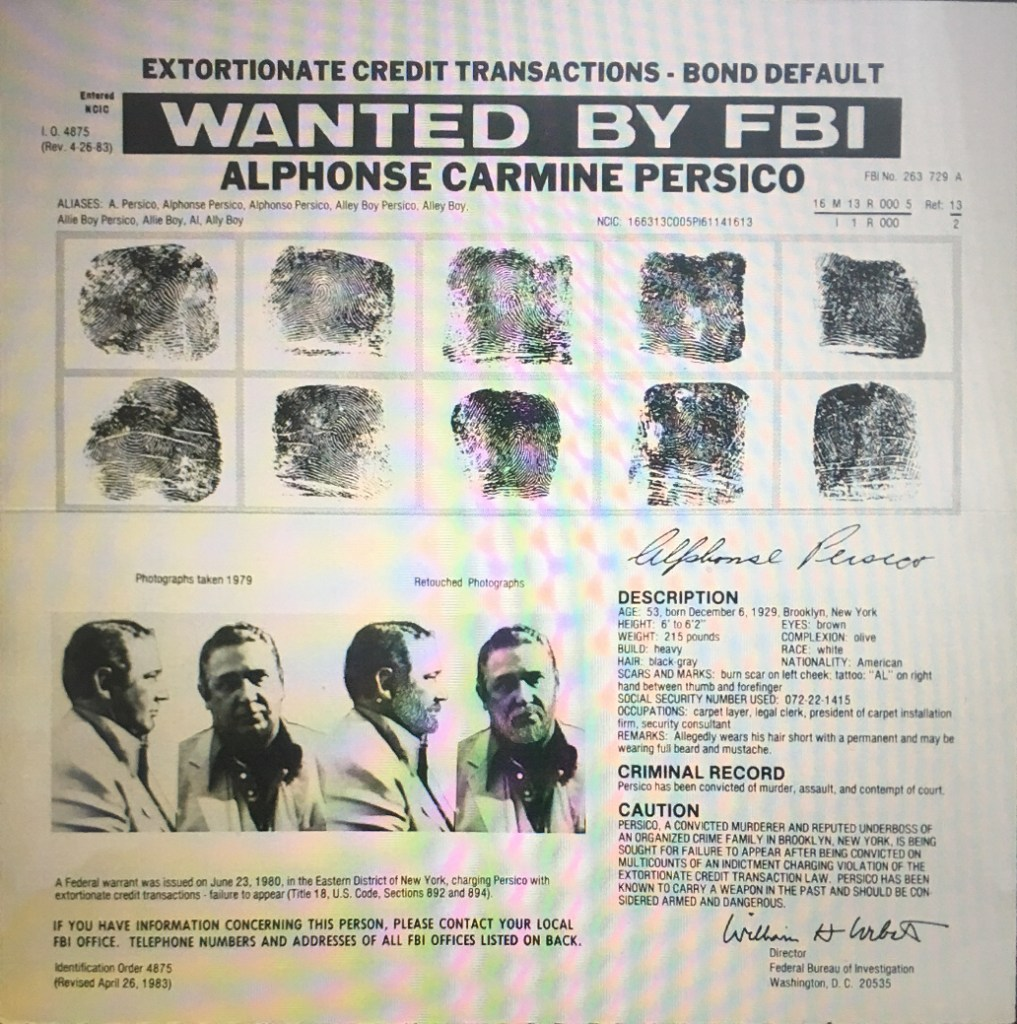
An FBI wanted poster of Alphonse Persico issued on April 26, 1983

Following the high-profile media exposure of Joseph Colombo and the murderous excesses of Joe Gallo, the family entered a period of comparative calm and stability. With Colombo in a coma, the family leadership went to Thomas DiBella, a man adept at evading authorities since his sole bootlegging conviction in 1932. DiBella was unable to prevent the Gambino family from chipping away at Colombo rackets, and the Colombos declined in power. Poor health forced DiBella to retire in 1977, and Colombo died in 1978. The Colombo family was facing another power vacuum.

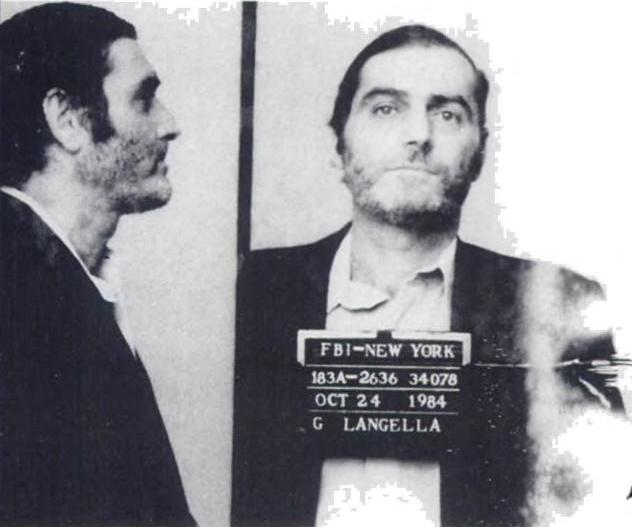
An FBI mugshot of Gennaro Langella in 1984

Carmine Perisco's incarceration coincided with the release of his brother Alphonse from seventeen years in prison. Persico designated Alphonse as acting boss with support as underboss from Gennaro Langella and Carmine's other brother, Theodore. Langella supervised various labor rackets for the family, including their stake in "Concrete Club", and exerted control over various labor unions, including Cement and Concrete Workers District Council, Local 6A.

In 1979, Carmine was released from federal prison. In November 1981, he was convicted of conspiracy and racketeering charges and sentenced to five years in prison.

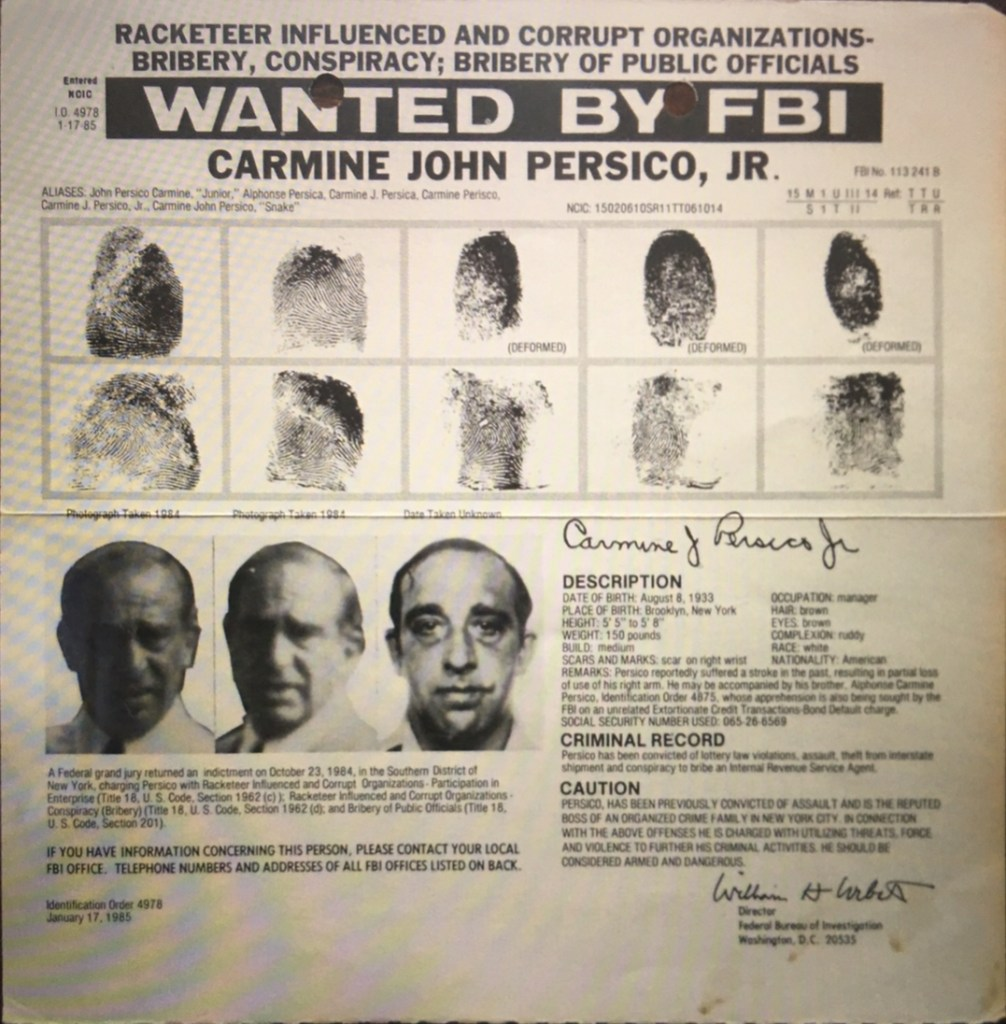
An FBI wanted poster of Carmine Persico issued on January 17, 1985

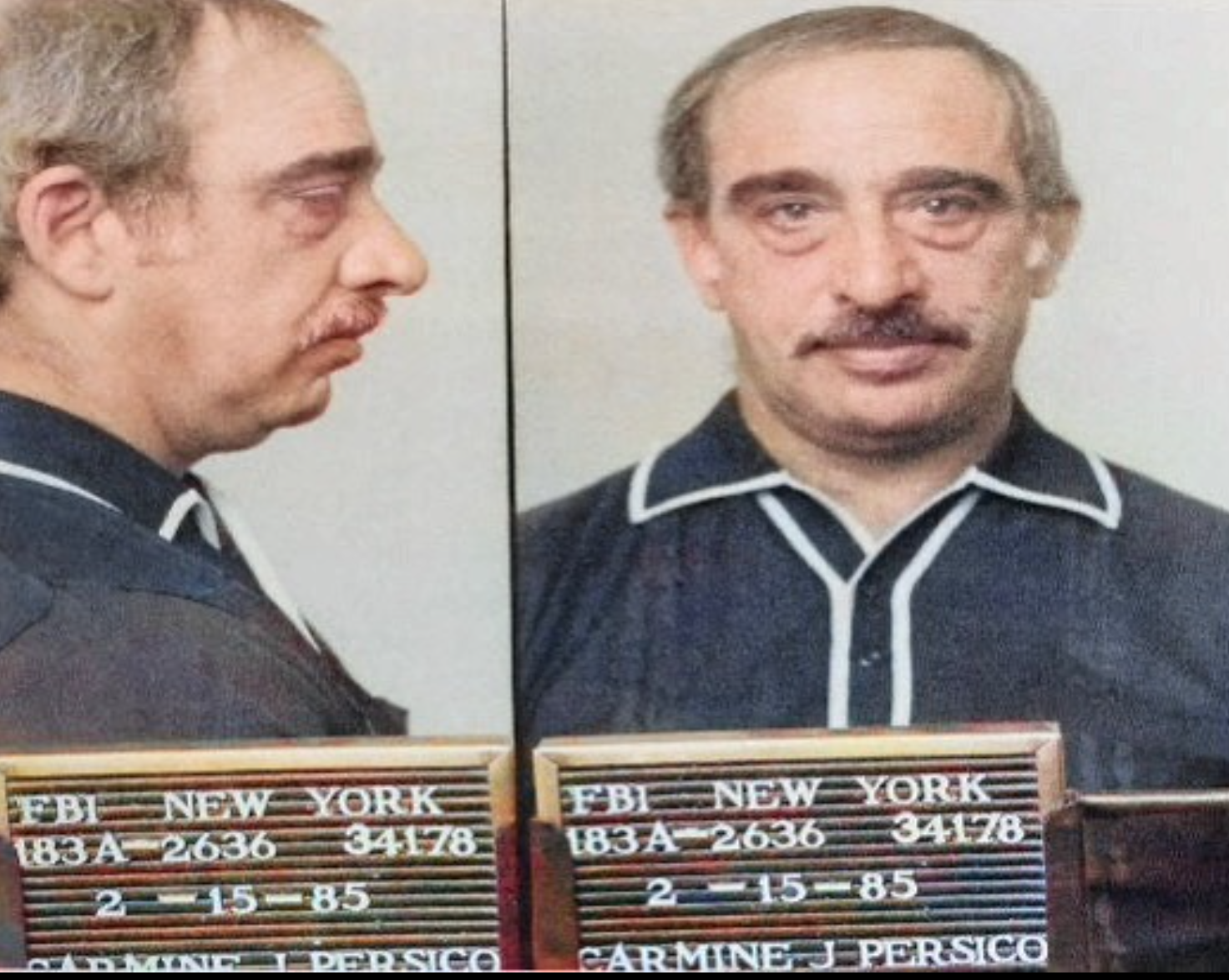
An FBI mugshot of Carmine Persico in 1985

On February 25, 1985, nine New York Mafia leaders, including Langella, followed by Persico, were indicted for narcotics trafficking, loansharking, gambling, labor racketeering and extortion against construction companies, as part of the Mafia Commission Trial. Prosecutors aimed to strike at all the crime families at once using their involvement in the Commission. Seven of the defendants were convicted of racketeering on November 19, 1986, with Persico and Langella each sentenced on January 13, 1987, to 100 years' imprisonment. In the separate Colombo Trial, Persico was sentenced to 39 years' imprisonment, Langella to 65 years' imprisonment, and Alphonse Persico to 12 years, on November 17, 1986.

Mafia historian and The New York Times organized-crime reporter Selwyn Raab later wrote that the Colombos suffered more long-term damage than any other family as a result of the Commission Trial. Raab pointed out that Persico was by far the youngest boss in New York and "at the peak of his abilities." Although he was 53 years old at the time of the Commission Trial, he had already headed the family for 14 years. In contrast, the other New York bosses were in their seventies and likely would have ceded power to mafiosi of Persico's generation even if they had not been sent to prison. Raab believed that Persico would have had a long reign ahead of him had the trial not intervened.

Although Persico knew he would never resume active control of the family, he was determined to ensure that his take of the family's illicit gains would continue to flow to his relatives. He had already named Alphonse as acting boss before his arrest, and retained Alphonse in that post after his arrest. However, not long afterward, Alphonse skipped bail from a loansharking arrest. Persico then named a three-man ruling panel to run the family.

In 1988, he dissolved the panel and named Victor Orena, the capo of Little Allie Boy's former crew in Brooklyn, as temporary acting boss. Persico made clear that Orena was merely a placeholder until Little Allie Boy could return to the streets. However, Persico empowered Orena to induct new members and order murders on his own authority–two prerogatives rarely granted to an acting boss.

=== Third Family War (1991–1993) ===
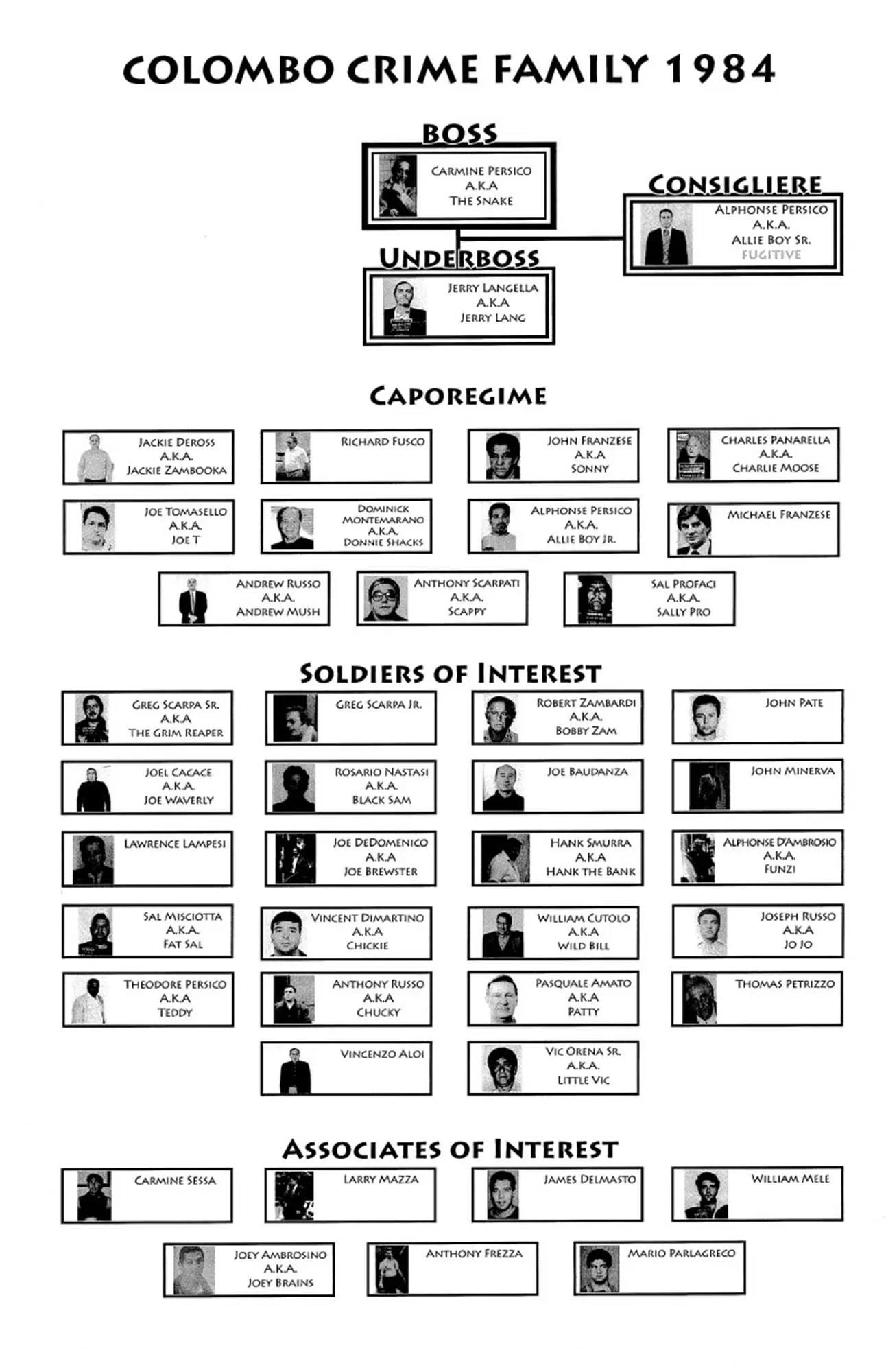
An FBI chart of the Colombo family in 1984

By 1991, Orena had come to believe Persico was out of touch and causing the family to miss out on lucrative opportunities. He was also alarmed at Persico's plans for a made-for-television biography, fearing that prosecutors could use it as evidence in the same way they had used Joe Bonanno's tell-all book as evidence in the Commission Trial. He therefore decided to take over the family himself.

Using his strong ties to Gambino boss John Gotti, Orena petitioned the Mafia Commission to recognize him as boss. Unwilling to cause more conflict, the Commission refused. Orena then instructed consigliere Carmine Sessa to poll the capos on whether Orena should replace Persico. Instead, Sessa alerted Persico that Orena was staging a palace coup. An enraged Persico ordered a hit on Orena. On June 21, 1991, when Orena arrived at his home in Cedarhurst on Long Island, he found gunmen under Sessa's leadership waiting for him. Orena managed to escape before the gunmen could strike. The third Colombo war had begun.

Orena sent his younger brother Michael "Mickey Brown" Orena's two sons—Michael and younger son William "Willy Boy" Orena—into Brooklyn on a murder mission. It is unclear what roles the two brothers played in the murders during the war, but F.B.I agents are certain they were responsible for the disappearance of 15 associates and business partners of the Orena clan. William "Willy Boy" Orena was picked up getting off of the Fire Island Ferry in Sayville, Long Island, with eight pistols believed to be used in the bloodshed and $43,000 in cash in his possession. During Willy Boy's stay at the Riverhead County Jail, all eight of the firearms disappeared from the evidence locker.

Twelve people, including three innocent bystanders, died in this gang war, and 18 associates have never been seen again. More than 80 made members and associates from both sides of the Colombo family were convicted, jailed or indicted. These included Persico's brother Theodore "Teddy" Persico and his son Alphonse Persico, DeRoss, Orena's nephew William V. Orena, his older brother Micheal Orena, and Orena's two sons, Victor Orena Jr. and John Orena. While both sides appealed to the Commission for help, the war continued. In November 1991, Gregory Scarpa, a Persico loyalist, was driving his daughter and granddaughter home when several Orena gunmen ambushed them. Scarpa and his relatives managed to escape.

The war continued until 1992, when Orena was convicted of racketeering, the 1989 Ocera murder, and other related charges. He received three life sentences plus 85 years in federal prison. 58 soldiers and associates—42 from the Persico faction and 16 from the Orena faction—were sent to prison. Raab later wrote that Persico's attempts to keep control of the family from prison nearly destroyed it. By his estimate, 70 of the family's members and associates were convicted as a result of the war, and the family was down to around 75 made members.

While the Colombo war raged, the Commission refused to allow any Colombo member to sit on the Commission and considered dissolving the family. Lucchese underboss Anthony Casso proposed to merge the family with his own to end the war, while in 2000, plans were proposed to split its manpower and resources among the remaining families. In 2002, with the help of Bonanno family boss Joseph Massino, the other families finally allowed the Colombos to rejoin the Commission.

=== The family after Third Colombo War ===
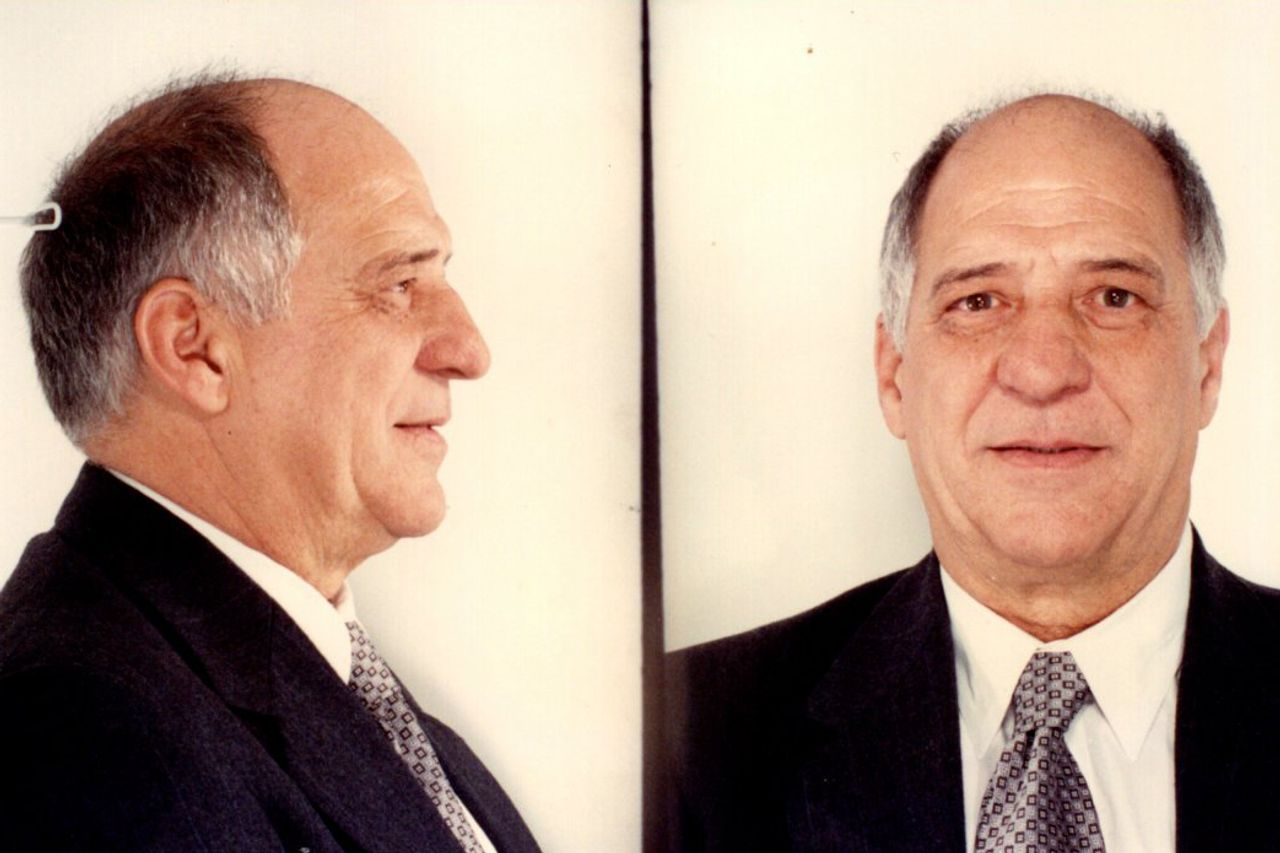
A mugshot of Andrew Russo in 1996

With Orena out of the picture, the way was clear for "Little Allie Boy" to become acting boss after his release in 1994. In 1994, Carmine Persico appointed Andrew Russo as acting boss. When Russo went to prison in 1996, Alphonse Persico took over as acting boss. In 1999, he was arrested in Fort Lauderdale after being caught in possession of a pistol and shotgun; as a convicted felon, he was barred from carrying guns.

Shortly after his arrest, Persico ordered the murder of underboss William "Wild Bill" Cutolo, an Orena supporter during the Third Colombo War. Cutolo's son, vowing revenge, offered to wear a wire and pose as a prospective Colombo associate. Based on evidence from this wire, Little Allie Boy was indicted on RICO charges. Realizing he stood no chance of acquittal, he pled guilty to the state charges in February 2000 and to the RICO charges in December 2001.

In 2004, Alphonse Persico and underboss John "Jackie" DeRoss were indicted for the Cutolo murder. In December 2007, both men were convicted and sentenced to life in prison. Family consigliere Joel "Joe Waverly" Cacace took over running the family until 2003, when he was imprisoned on murder and racketeering charges.

The family then came under the influence of Thomas "Tommy Shots" Gioeli, who took over as street boss. In June 2008, Gioeli, underboss John "Sonny" Franzese, former consigliere Joel Cacace, captain Dino Calabro, soldier Dino Saracino, and several other members and associates, including Orlando "Ori" Spado, were indicted on multiple racketeering charges, including loansharking, extortion and three murders dating back to the Colombo Wars. Alphonse Persico was sentenced to life imprisonment on February 27, 2009, for the Cutolo murder.

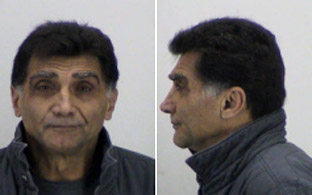
A mugshot of Ralph DeLeo

After Gioeli was imprisoned, Ralph F. DeLeo, who operated from Boston, Massachusetts, became the family's street boss. On December 17, 2009, the FBI charged DeLeo and Colombo family members with drug trafficking, extortion and loansharking in Massachusetts, Rhode Island, New York, Florida and Arkansas.

=== Current position ===
With DeLeo imprisoned, Andrew "Andy Mush" Russo once again took control of the family. On January 20, 2011, street boss Andrew Russo, acting underboss Benjamin Castellazzo, consigliere Richard Fusco, and others were charged with murder, narcotics trafficking, and labor racketeering. In September 2011, Castellazzo and Fusco pleaded guilty to reduced charges. In December 2011, it was revealed that capo Reynold Maragni wore a wire for the FBI and gained information about Thomas Gioeli's role in the 1999 murder of William Cutolo.

On July 11, 2018, four associates and members of the Colombo crime family were part of a 32-count indictment charging them with a number of crimes, including money laundering, racketeering, illegal gambling, and extortion. The crimes allegedly took place between December 2010 and June 2018, predominantly in Brooklyn and Staten Island. Two made members of the Colombo family, Vito DiFalco and Jerry Ciauri, were among the accused. Gambino crime family soldier Anthony Licata was also indicted.

On March 7, 2019, Colombo family boss Carmine Persico died in prison. With Carmine Persico's death, his son Alphonse Persico, who had been serving as longtime acting boss for his father while also serving life in prison, was demoted from his position in the administration. The members of the Colombo family voted for Andrew "Mush" Russo to be the new official boss of the Colombo family. Russo was Carmine Persico's cousin and had been serving as the Colombo family's longtime street boss for years. His inner circle included underboss Benjamin "Benji" Castellazzo, consigliere Ralph DiMatteo, capo Vincent "Vinny Unions" Ricciardo, capo Richard Ferrara and capo Theodore "Teddy" Persico Jr.

On October 3, 2019, capo Joseph Amato, along with Daniel Capaldo and Thomas Scorcia, were indicted on extortion and loansharking charges. On March 22, 2021, Amato pleaded guilty.

On August 13, 2020, an indictment charged Colombo family associate Frangesco "Frankie" Russo, Genovese family soldier Christopher Chierchio, attorney Jason "Jay" Kurland and securities broker Frank Smookler with conspiracy, wire fraud and money laundering. The indictment accused the "lottery attorney" Kurland, along with Russo, Chierchio and Smookler, of swindling $80 million from jackpot winners in an illegal scheme which involved siphoning money from the winners' investments. Frangesco "Frankie" Russo has been identified as the son of former Colombo captain Joseph "JoJo" Russo, and the grandson of Andrew "Mush" Russo, the reputed boss of the Colombo family.

On September 14, 2021, an indictment was served that included the Colombo family's boss, Andrew "Mush" Russo, underboss Benjamin "Benji" Castellazzo, consigliere Ralph "Big Ralphie" DiMatteo, captains Vincent Ricciardi, Richard Ferrara, and Theodore "Teddy" Persico Jr., soldier Michael Uvino, and associates Thomas Costa and Domenick Ricciardo. The indictment charged these members of the Colombo family with infiltrating and taking control of a Queens-based labor union and its affiliated health care benefit program, as well as conspiring to commit fraud in connection with workplace safety certifications.

Ralph DiMatteo was not present when the indictment was served and was declared a fugitive, but surrendered to the FBI on September 17, 2021. Richard Ferrara became an informant for the government, providing information which helped convict two Russian gangsters of lying to the FBI about the 2009 murder of a Russian businessman. In December 2023, the remaining defendants were sentenced to prison, Ralph DiMatteo received three years, Theodore Persico received five years, and Benjamin Castellazzo was given fifteen months.

On April 20, 2022, Andrew Russo's lawyer Jeffrey Lichtman announced that Russo had died at the age of 87 on April 18, 2022. On April 23, 2022, Andrew Russo's funeral was attended by 100 mourners in Brooklyn. Robert "Little Robert" Donofrio, a long-time soldier who initially sided with the Orena Faction but switched to the Persico Faction during the third war, is now believed to be running the family as acting boss until Theodore 'Skinny Teddy' Persico's release from prison in 2025.

On February 5, 2025, Joseph Orapallo and his son Frank, who are descendants of the family's former capo Joseph Tomasello, were arrested on major gun charges.

On February 11, 2026, Theodore Persico was ordered to return to prison for a nine month sentence a month after he pled guilty to violating his supervised release terms by meeting with organized crime members during a Christmas party in December 2025. Around this time, the New York Times described Persico as by now being the Colombo crime family's "former boss." In January 2026, Persico aide and recent Colombo street boss Francis "PR" Guerra was determined to now be the Colombo family's acting boss.

== Historical leadership ==
=== Boss (official and acting) ===
- 1920–1927 — Salvatore DiBella – stepped down
- 1927–1962 — Joseph Profaci – died of natural causes
  - Acting 1962–1963 — Joseph Magliocco – deposed by the Commission, never approved as official boss
  - Acting 1963 — John Misuraca – stepped down, returned to his capo position in New Jersey
  - Acting 1963 — Joseph Colombo – became official boss
- 1963–1973 — Joseph Colombo – on June 28, 1971, Colombo was shot three times and paralyzed by assassination attempt
  - Acting 1971–1972 — Joseph "Joe Yak" Yacovelli – fled, after the murder of Joe Gallo
  - Acting 1972 — Joseph "Joey" Brancato – stepped down
  - Acting 1972–1973 – Vincenzo Aloi – imprisoned
- 1974–1979 — Thomas DiBella – imprisoned 1974–1975; stepped down, became consigliere
  - Acting 1974 — Anthony "Tony Shots" Abbatemarco – stepped down
  - Acting 1974–1975 — Joseph "Joey" Brancato – stepped down
- 1979–2019 — Carmine "Junior" Persico – imprisoned 1973–1979, 1981–1984, 1985–2019, died on March 7, 2019
  - Acting 1981–1983 — Alphonse "Allie Boy" Persico – Carmine Persico's brother; fugitive 1980–1987, imprisoned
  - Acting 1983–1984 — Gennaro "Gerry Lang" Langella – imprisoned
  - Acting 1985–1987 — Anthony "Scappy" Scarpati – imprisoned
  - Acting 1987–1991 — Vittorio "Vic" Orena – imprisoned sentenced to life
  - Acting 1991–1993 — Vacant – disputed leadership during the third war
  - Acting 1994–1996 — Andrew "Andy Mush" Russo – imprisoned March 1997
  - Acting 1996–2019 — Alphonse "Little Allie Boy" Persico – Carmine Persico's son; imprisoned sentenced to life in 2009
- 2019–2022 — Andrew "Andy Mush" Russo – indicted on September 14, 2021. Died on April 18, 2022.
  - Acting 2022–2025 — Robert "Little Robert" Donofrio – became acting underboss
- 2025–present — Theodore N. "Skinny Teddy" Persico Jr.
  - Acting 2025–present — Francis "BF" Guerra

=== Street boss ===
- 1987 — Ruling Panel – Benedetto Aloi, Vincent "Jimmy" Angelino and Joseph T. Tomasello – disbanded September 1987
- 1991–1993 — Joseph T. Tomasello
- 1993–1994 — Ruling Panel – Joseph T. Tomasello, Theodore "Teddy" Persico and Joseph Baudanza – disbanded 1994
- 1994–1996 — Alphonse "Little Allie Boy" Persico – became acting boss
- 1996–1999 — Andrew "Andy Mush" Russo – imprisoned
- 2000–2003 — Joel "Joe Waverly" Cacace – imprisoned January 2003
- 2003–2008 — Thomas "Tommy Shots" Gioeli – imprisoned June 2008
- 2008–2009 — Ralph F. DeLeo – operated from New England, imprisoned December 2009
- 2009–2010 — Ruling Panel – Theodore N. Persico Jr. (jailed) and others
- 2010–2011 — Andrew "Andy Mush" Russo – jailed January 2011
- 2013–2014 — Salvatore "Sally Bread" Cambria – stepped down
- 2014–2019 — Andrew "Andy Mush" Russo – released from prison on June 13, 2013, became boss 2019
- 2025–2026 — Francis "BF" Guerra – became acting boss
- 2026–present — Salvatore "Sally Boy" Fusco Jr.

=== Underboss (official and acting) ===
- 1928–1962 — Joseph "Joe Malyak" Magliocco – promoted to boss
- 1962–1963 — Salvatore "Sally the Sheik" Musacchio – brother-in-law to Joseph Magliocco
- 1962–1963 — John Misuraca – became acting boss
- 1963–1967 — John "Sonny" Franzese – imprisoned
- 1967–1973 — Salvatore "Charlie Lemons" Mineo – stepped down
- 1973–1977 — Anthony "Tony Shots" Abbatemarco – fled
  - Acting 1973–1975 — Andrew "Andy Mush" Russo
- 1977–1981 — Alphonse "Allie Boy" Persico – Carmine Persico's brother; promoted to acting boss
- 1981–1994 — Gennaro "Gerry Lang" Langella – promoted to acting boss
  - Acting 1983–1987 — John "Sonny" Franzese
  - Acting 1987— Benedetto "Benny" Aloi
  - Acting 1991–1993 — Vacant — disputed leadership during the third war
- 1994–1999 — Joel "Joe Waverly" Cacace – became consigliere
  - Acting 1994–1999 — Benedetto "Benny" Aloi
- 1999 — William "Wild Bill" Cutolo – murdered 1999
- 1999–2004 — John DeRoss – imprisoned life sentence
  - Acting 2001–2003 — Thomas Gioeli – promoted to street boss
- 2004–2011 — John "Sonny" Franzese – On January 14, 2011, was sentenced to eight years in prison; released June 23, 2017
  - Acting 2008–2009 — Theodore "Skinny Teddy" Persico Jr. – Theodore Persico's son; joined the ruling panel
  - Acting 2009–2011 — Benjamin "Benji" Castellazzo – jailed January 2011
- 2015–2021 — Benjamin "Benji" Castellazzo – released from prison on August 14, 2015; indicted on September 14, 2021
- 2021–2025 — Joel "Joe Waverly" Cacace – became consigliere
- 2025–present — Francis "BF" Guerra
  - Acting 2025–present — Robert "Little Robert" Donofrio

=== Consigliere (official and acting) ===
- 1931–1954 — Salvatore Profaci – Joseph Profaci's brother; died
- 1954–1959 — Giuseppe "Joseph/Peppino/Tony" Buffa – Joe Profaci's son Sal was married to Buffa's daughter; he died in 1959
  - Acting 1959–1964 — Calogero "Charles the Sidge" LoCicero – murdered 1968
  - Acting 1963 — Salvatore Badalamenti – stepped down
  - Acting 1964–1965 — Benedetto D'Alessandro – appointed to official consigliere
- 1965–1969 — Benedetto D'Alessandro
- 1969–1971 — Joseph "Joey Yack" Yacovelli – became acting boss 1971
  - Acting 1974–1975 — Charles Panarella
- 1975–1977 — Alphonse "Allie Boy" Persico – Carmine Persico's brother; promoted to underboss
- 1977–1983 — Thomas "Old Man" DiBella – stepped down
- 1983–1988 — Alphonse "Allie Boy" Persico – Carmine Persico's brother; died in 1989
  - Acting 1983–1986 — Thomas "Old Man" DiBella – retired
  - Acting 1987–1988 — Vincent "Jimmy" Angellina – murdered
- 1988–1993 — Carmine Sessa – later became a government informant
  - Acting 1988–1991 — Benedetto "Benny" Aloi – promoted to acting underboss
  - Acting 1991–1993 — Vacant – disputed leadership during the third war
- 1993–1999 — Vincenzo Aloi
- 1999–2008 — Joel "Joe Waverly" Cacace – imprisoned 2004
  - Acting 2001–2004 — Ralph "Ralphie" Lombardo
  - Acting 2004–2008 — Vincenzo Aloi
- 2008–2011 — Richard "Richie Nerves" Fusco – jailed January 2011
- 2011–2019 — Thomas "Tom Mix" Farese – In December 2012, Farese was acquitted of money laundering charges. He currently operates in South Florida.
- 2019–2025 — Ralph "Big Ralphie" DiMatteo – indicted on September 14, 2021
- 2025–present — Joel "Joe Waverly" Cacace
  - Acting 2026–present — Thomas "Tommy Shots" Gioeli

=== Factions of the third war ===
The Colombo crime family divided into two factions during the third family war (1991 to 1993).

Persico faction

- Boss – Carmine "Junior" Persico
- Acting boss – Joseph T. Tomasello
- Underboss – Gerry Langella
- Acting underboss – Joseph "JoJo" Russo
- Consigliere – Carmine Sessa

Orena faction

- Faction Boss – Vittorio "Vic" Orena
- Faction Underboss – Benedetto "Benny" Aloi
- Faction Acting Underboss – Joseph Scopo
- Faction Consigliere – Vincenzo Aloi

== Current members ==
=== Administration ===
- Boss — Theodore N. "Skinny Teddy" Persico Jr. — former capo and son of Theodore Persico Sr. Persico was inducted as a soldier for the Colombo family in January 1987. It is believed Persico ordered the murder of Joseph Scopo, who had served as the underboss of the Orena faction during the Colombo family war in the early 1990s, Scopo was shot 3 times and killed in October 1993. In April 2004, Persico was released from prison after serving 16 years in prison, after he was convicted of drug dealing cocaine in May 1988. According to prosecutors at his trial in 1988, Persico had sold 13 ounces of cocaine to an undercover law enforcement officer on 3 occasions in June 1986. He helped lead the family from 2008, until his arrest in 2009, working with his cousins Michael Persico and Lawrence Persico. He was released from prison on May 29, 2020. Persico Jr. was rounded up in an extensive indictment against the family that took place on September 14, 2021. In December 2023, Persico was sentenced to five years in prison. After longtime boss Carmine Persico died on March 7, 2019, his cousin and longtime acting boss Andrew "Andy Mush" Russo became the new official boss of the Colombo crime family. Russo served as boss until he died on April 18, 2022. Robert Donofrio was named 'acting boss' while Persico Jr served his sentence. Persico was released in July 2025. In late 2025, he started organizing the family administration. In January 2026, Persico pleaded guilty to violating his supervised release conditions by meeting with four other mobsters at a Colombo family Christmas party in December 2025, he had met two captains, Angelo Spata and John Maggio, and a Colombo family soldier, Michael Demiccio. In February 2026, Persico was sentenced to 4 months in prison.
- Acting boss/underboss — Francis "BF" Guerra — currently serving as the acting/street boss and underboss of the family. On September 23, 2013, Guerra was sentenced to 14 years in prison for his role in obtaining and distributing prescription drugs. During his sentencing the government proved that Guerra had committed numerous additional crimes, including the 1992 murder of Michael Devine and the 1993 murder of Joseph Scopo. The government also proved that Guerra had been a longtime member of the Persico faction.
- Street boss — Salvatore "Sally Boy" Fusco Jr. — in late 2025, Fusco Jr. began serving as Street boss and is considered a senior member of the family's administration. Fusco Jr. was made sometime in 1990 and was a formerly part of the "Bypass Gang". He is very close with boss Theodore N. Persico Jr. dating back into the 1970s. His father Salvatore Fusco Sr. served as a captain and was a member of the Colombo family ruling panel in the 1990s, his grandfather Frank Fusco served as captain in family, and his uncle Richard Fusco served as a Colombo family consigliere.
- Acting underboss — Robert "Little Robert" Donofrio — current acting underboss of the family. A former loanshark in Brooklyn, Donofrio was inducted into the Colombo family in December 1988 by acting boss Victor Orena with the blessing of imprisoned official boss Carmine Persico, and was sponsored by then-capo William Cutolo. He was originally an Orena faction member during the third family war and a close confidant of Orena's capo William Cutolo, but switched sides to the Persico faction in 1991 and became part of Pasquale Amato's crew. Donofrio and other Persico loyalists were part of various attempts to murder several of Orena's underlings between June 1991 and July 1992, including Cutolo, Orena's underboss Joseph Scopo, capo Thomas Petrizzo, soldier Vincent DeMartino and associate Gabriel Scianna, but were unsuccessful with each of their targets. He was later arrested in the aftermath of the war, and pleaded guilty to conspiracy to commit murder in 1993, being sentenced to eight years in prison. He was released on July 14, 2000, and got off supervised release in 2003. In late 2010, he was recorded on a wiretap speaking with capo Anthony "Big Anthony" Russo about an effort by the Colombo family to extort the Gambino family in order to pay medical expenses for family associate Walter Samperi, who was stabbed by a Gambino associate in 2008. Donofrio operates a produce business and was identified as the family's acting boss in July 2023, having been able to avoid federal prosecutions despite law enforcement efforts.
- Consigliere — Joel "Joe Waverly" Cacace — is consigliere of the family. In 2021, Cacace was appointed Underboss to assist in stabilizing the family along with the newly appointed acting boss Robert Donofrio. During the 1990s and early 2000s, Cacace served as acting boss & consigliere in the family. Cacace survived two failed assassination attempts, one in 1976 and the second in 1992, when he exchanged gunshots with Colombo gangster Greg Scarpa during the third family war. During the third war Cacace had been aligned with the Orena faction although he later changed his allegiance to the Persico faction. In 2003, Cacace was indicted on murder charges and convicted and served 15 years in prison. He was released from prison in May 2020. Cacace maintains a close relationship with both of the DiMatteo brother's, consigliere Ralph DiMatteo and captain Luca DiMatteo.
- Acting Consigliere — Thomas "Tommy Shots" Gioeli — born in October 1952. In late 2025, Gioeli has been serving as acting consigliere helping Joel Cacace. He previously served a capo operating in Long Island, Brooklyn, and Staten Island before becoming "street boss" during the 2000s. In June 2008, he was indicted on multiple racketeering and murder charges stemming from the Third Colombo Family War along with John Franzese, Joel Cacace, Dino Calabro and Dino Saracino. In 2011, Gioeli's acting capo Paul Bevacqua became a government informant. In March 2014, Gioeli was sentenced to 18 years in prison for ordering and orchestrating the murders of Frank Marasa in June 1991, and Michael Imbergamo and John Minerva in March 1992. However, he was acquitted of orchestrating the murders of Richard Greaves in August 1995, NYPD officer Ralph Dols in August 1997, and former Colombo family underboss William Cutolo in May 1999. He was released on May 3, 2023.

=== Caporegimes ===
Brooklyn faction

- Carmine L. Persico — born in November 1970. Current capo. Persico is a half-brother to Theodore N. "Skinny Teddy" Persico Jr., and the nephew to former boss Carmine "Junior" Persico. In May 2005, Persico was indicted for extortion.
- William "Billy" Russo — born in November 1954. Current capo. Russo is the son of Andrew "Andy Mush" Russo, who served as boss of the Colombo family in around the 2020s. His brother Joseph "Jo Jo" Russo died in prison in 2007.
- Angelo Spata Jr. — born in June 1974. Current capo. In January 2014, Spata Jr. was sentenced to over 1 year in prison after he had pleaded guilty to illegal gambling and for the extortion of vendors at the Santa Rosalia festival.

Staten Island

- John Maggio — capo operating in Staten Island and Brooklyn. In February 2012, Maggio was sentenced to under house arrest for illegally trafficking 200 cartons of contraband cigarettes.

Bronx

- Dennis "Fat Dennis" DeLucia — capo with gambling operations in the Bronx. In 2011, he was indicted along with acting boss Andrew Russo and soldiers Ilario Sessa and Joseph Savarese, as well as Angelo Spata, Carmine Persico's son-in-law. In 2012, he pleaded guilty to extortion of a rival gambling club in the Bronx and before his sentencing his lesbian daughter described him as "a same-sex marriage supporter, despite his role in the Mafia". DeLucia was released from prison on July 12, 2013.

New Jersey

- Edward "Tall Eddie" Garofalo — capo operating out of a restaurant in Atlantic City, New Jersey. In 2010, Garofalo was arrested alongside Theodore "Skinny Teddy" Persico on racketeering associated with the extortion of construction companies and labor unions. After his release from prison Garofalo moved to Southern Jersey which caused Colombo family leaders to have sit downs with Philadelphia family boss Joseph Merlino and Joseph Ciancaglini about Garofalo.

=== Soldiers ===
New York

- Joseph "Joe" Amato — former capo operating a loansharking operation on Staten Island. On October 3, 2019, Amato along with son Joseph Amato Jr., soldiers Daniel Capaldo and Thomas Scorcia and associate Anthony Silvestro were indicted on extortion and loansharking charges. His son Joseph Amato Jr. lost his million dollar bail because of his father's reputation. On March 22, 2021, Amato and his son accepted plea deals on all charges. In October 2021, Amato was sentenced to 70 months in prison. Released from prison on November 13, 2023.
- Carmine Baudanza — soldier; born in December 1942. In December 2007, Baudanza was sentenced to seven years in prison, after he was indicted in March 2006 following a three-year investigation by the FBI and the IRS for a $20 million fraud operation.
- Joseph Baudanza — former capo with operations in Brooklyn, Manhattan and Staten Island. Baudanza along with his brother Carmine and nephew John Baudanza were arrested and convicted on stock fraud in 2008. Baudanza was released from prison in February 2011.
- Richard Cappa — born in April 1971. In 1993, Cappa was indicted on charges of conspiracy to murder and illegal gambling. In November 2012, Cappa pleaded guilty to extortion in connection with a $13,000 debt.
- Salvatore "Sally Boy" Castagno — former capo of the "Gravesend-Coney Island crew" (aka "East Third Street Clique") which was previously controlled by Benjamin Castellazzo.
- Benjamin "Benji" Castellazzo — also known as "The Claw", former underboss in the family. Castellazzo is the former capo of the "Gravesend Brooklyn crew". In 2000, Castellazzo was indicted along Michael Nobile, Anthony Amoruso, Frank DeVito, Stephen Mignano, Joey Mercuri, and Joseph Wiley on illegal gambling chargers in Gravesend, Brooklyn. On January 20, 2011, Castellazzo was indicted on federal racketeering charges. In September 2011, Castellazzo pleaded guilty to a reduced charge. On January 30, 2013, Castellazzo was sentenced to 63 months in prison. Castellazzo was released from federal custody on August 14, 2015. On September 14, 2021, Castellazzo was indicted and charged along with boss Andrew Russo, consigliere Ralph DiMatteo and three captains Theodore Persico Jr., Richard Ferrara and Vincent Ricciardo with infiltrating and taking control of a Queens-based labor union. In December 2023, Benjamin Castellazzo was sentenced to fifteen months in prison. He has a current release date of September 5, 2024.
- Michael Catapano — former acting capo and a nephew of John Franzese who was involved in extorting gambling clubs on Long Island. In 2008, Catapano was indicted along with acting boss Thomas Gioeli, underboss John "Sonny" Franzese and other members of the crime family. In November 2010, he was sentenced to 6 1/2 years imprisonment after he had pleaded guilty to conspiracy to commit extortion and conspired to sell 50 kilograms of cocaine. He was released on April 29, 2016.
- Giovanni "John" Cerbone — Cerbone is part of the Staten Island crew run by Joseph Amato. In 2015, he pleaded guilty to money laundering, distribution of cocaine, marijuana, and oxycodone pills. Cerbone was sentenced to 5-years imprisonment.
- James "Jimmy Green Eyes" Clemenza — former capo operating in Brooklyn. On August 25, 1961, he tried to strangle Larry Gallo with a rope in a Brooklyn bar. In the mid-1990s, Clemenza along with his brother Gerard "Jerry", and brothers Chris and Anthony Colombo, were suspended without pay for backing Orena during the family war. In 1999, Clemenza, along with his brother Jerry, were under FBI surveillance attending a dinner in a Little Italy restaurant on Mulberry Street with cast members of The Sopranos.
- Andrew "Andre" D'Apice — soldier; born in 1973. In May 2005, D'Apice was indicted alongside Theodore Persico Jr., his cousin, for extortion and racketeering.
- Vincent "Chickie" DeMartino — soldier. In June 1991, DeMartino was inducted as a soldier in the Colombo family by Vic Orena and William Cutolo. In April 1993, DeMartino was sentenced to four years in prison on weapons charges. In 1999, Alphonse Persico ordered DeMartino and Thomas Gioeli to murder Cutolo, who was subsequently shot and killed in May 1999. DeMartino was paid $50,000 for the murder. On July 16, 2001, DeMartino and Michael Spataro attempted to murder Joseph Campanella, but failed. In 2004, Campanella testified against DeMartino, and in early May 2004, DeMartino was sentenced by former U.S. District Judge Raymond Dearie to 25 years in prison. In May 2022, DeMartino was released from prison due to health problems.
- Luca DiMatteo — former capo who previously served as acting captain of the Lombardo crew. His younger brother Ralph DiMatteo is the family's consigliere. On July 9, 2015, DiMatteo along with his nephew Luca "Lukey" DiMatteo were indicted and charged with racketeering conspiracy, extortion, loansharking, and operating an illegal gambling business in Brooklyn and elsewhere between January 2009 and June 2015. The indictment identified DiMatteo as a longtime acting captain in the Colombo family. On September 9, 2016, DiMatteo was sentenced to 33 months in prison. He was released from prison on January 8, 2018.
- Ralph "Big Ralphie" DiMatteo — former consigliere of the family. On September 14, 2021, DiMatteo was indicted and charged along with boss Andrew Russo, underboss Benjamin Castellazzo and three captains, Theodore Persico Jr., Richard Ferrara and Vincent Ricciardo, with infiltrating and taking control of a Queens-based labor union. DiMatteo was not physically rounded up in the initial arrests, and was considered a fugitive. On September 17, after his son's tweets blew his Florida cover he surrendered to the FBI at 26 Federal Plaza in Manhattan. In July 2023, DiMatteo pleaded guilty to extortion, conspiracy and money laundering from 2020 to 2021. In December 2023, Ralph DiMatteo was sentenced to three years in prison. He has a current release date of February 26, 2026.
- Thomas "Tom Mix" Farese — former consigliere and nephew through marriage to former boss Carmine Persico. His wife Suzanne is the daughter of the late Alphonse Persico (Carmine Persico's brother). When he was promoted to Consigliere, Farese maintained the control of the Florida faction. In the 1970s, Farese moved from Boston to Fort Lauderdale, Florida where he became friends with Colombo mobster Nicholas Forlano. In July 1978, Farese was inducted into the Colombo family. In 1980, he was convicted of smuggling marijuana, sentenced to 30 years in prison, and released in 1994. In 1998, Farese pled guilty to money laundering. On January 5, 2012, Farese was indicted on charges of loansharking and money laundering in South Florida and was released on bail. Prosecutors obtained evidence on Farese through a recording device on government informant Reynold Maragni. In September 2012, during his trial the judge allowed Farese lawyer to inspect informant Reynold Maragni's wristwatch that contained secret recording device. In December 2012, Farese was acquitted of all charges. In April 2021, Farese was charged with one count of federal healthcare fraud. He and several partners, including Colombo associate Patrick Truglia, owned an orthotic brace supply company in Florida from 2017 to 2019, nominally owned by others, which engaged in kickback schemes to bribe medical providers and telehealth services to unnecessarily prescribe elderly patients with braces, which would be charged to Medicare. The court dockets of Farese and Truglia were sealed, unlike the other defendants in the case. The indictment did not mention Farese's ties to organized crime.
- Anthony "Tony Black" Induisi — current soldier and former capo active in Florida. Born in 1949 or 1950. According to the FBI, Induisi was initiated into the Colombo family in August 1978 and was placed in a crew operated by captain Johnny Irish Matera, who was later murdered in July 1981. According to the FBI and U.S. Marshall's Service in 1981, Induisi was placed at a meeting with the Colombo family, with Carmine Persico, Tom DiBella, Vic Orena, John Matera, Gennaro Langella, Allie Persico and Vic Regina, and from the DeCavalcante crime family, Giovanni Riggi, Sam DeCavalcante, Stefano Vitabile, and Jimmy Rotondo. In August 1994, Induisi was sentenced to 5 years in prison with 3 years of probation and a fine of $10,000, for operating a $3 million-a-year illegal sports bookmaking business in Tamarac, Florida from between 1988 and 1989. According to prosecutors, Induisi hired a hitman in 1989 to kill the son of an American Mafia soldier in Broward County, however the murder was never carried out.
- Vincent Langella — the son of Gennaro Langella. In 2001, Langella pleaded guilty to racketeering conspiracy. On July 3, 2001, he was sentenced to 27 months in prison. Langella was released on April 12, 2005.
- Vincent "Vinny the Boxer" Maddalone — member of former capo of the "Sally Bread" Cambria's crew. Maddalone is a former professional boxer.
- Craig "Little Craig" Marino — soldier. In March 2006, Marino was indicted for extortion.
- Joseph "Joe Fish" Marra — imprisoned after being sentenced to 37 months in federal custody for a racketeering conviction in 2021. in 2023, Marra has a released from prison.
- Joseph "Joe Monte" Monteleone — born in 1940. Monteleone was a Persico loyalist during the 1990s Colombo family war. Monteleone was sentenced to life imprisonment on murder and racketeering charges. He was released from prison in 2023.
- Alphonse "Little Allie Boy" Persico — Carmine Persico's son and former acting boss of the family. In 2009, Alphonse was sentenced to life in prison and is currently in the FCI McKean in Pennsylvania. In March 2019, his father and longtime boss Carmine Persico died in prison.
- Anthony "Chucky" Russo — a soldier and former capo. His cousin is William "Billy" Russo and his uncle was Andrew "Andy Mush" Russo. In the 1990s, during the third family war Anthony Russo worked closely with his now deceased cousin Joseph "JoJo" Russo in Brooklyn and Long Island. Russo and his cousin "JoJo" Russo, were Persico loyalists who attempted to kill Victor Orena in June 1991. In November 2022, Russo was granted a reduced life sentence and will be eligible for release in six years. In 2023, Russo released from prison.
- Dino "Little Dino" Saracino — born in 1972 in Castellammare del Golfo, Sicily, he and his family moved to Bensonhurst, Brooklyn, shortly after he was born. During the Colombo war in the 1990s, Saracino was loyal to Carmine Persico. He plotted to murder Michael Burnside during that time as retribution for taking his brother' life. He was sentenced to 50 years in April 2014 and was sent to a Pennsylvania federal prison to do his time; acquitted of murdering NYPD police officer Ralph Dols although he was convicted of witness tampering, extortion and murder conspiracy. It is apparent that he became an initiated soldier after either killing Dols in 1997 or high ranking Colombo member Joseph Scopo in 1993 however according to law he was found not guilty. His brother Sebastian "Sebby" Saracino testified against him at his trial. It is known that Saracino was close and a member of Thomas Gioeli's crew. In October 2017, he appealed his conviction and it was denied.
- Thomas Scorcia — On October 3, 2019, he was part of an indictment targeting members of the Colombo family for racketeering, extortion and loansharking. Scorcia was overheard on a wiretap discussing a scheme to fix an NCAA college basketball game.
- Vincent "Vinny Linen" Scura — current soldier since at least 2023. Born in 1961. Scura was indicted in October 2019 on charges of racketeering, loansharking and extortion.
- John Staluppi — born in January 1947. In 1972, Staluppi pleaded guilty to receiving stolen car parts. He was identified by the FBI as a member of the Colombo family during the early 1990s. Staluppi is a successful businessman and yacht owner, reputedly worth between $400 million and $500 million.
- Anthony Stropoli — current soldier since at least 2023. In June 2000, Stropoli was charged for securities fraud and wall street related scams.
- Michael Uvino — a former capo, Uvino ran his crew from "The Sons of Italy Social Club" in Hauppauge, Long Island. In 2009, Uvino was sentenced to 10 years for running illegal card games on Long Island and for assaulting two men. His release date was May 24, 2016. He was indicted in September 2021 along with Andrew Russo, Benjamin Castellazzo, Ralph DiMatteo and other members.

Massachusetts

- Ralph F. DeLeo — from Somerville, Massachusetts he led the New England faction of the family. During the 1990s, while in prison he met Alphonse Persico he was released in 1997. In 2000, he was inducted into the Colombo crime family. In 2008, DeLeo became street boss after Thomas Gioeli was arrested. On December 17, 2009, DeLeo was indicted on racketeering charges from crimes in five different states. He is currently imprisoned with a release date of May 28, 2024. He was released into a halfway house in October 2023, and on May 28, 2024, he was released.

=== Imprisoned members ===
- Aurelio "Ray" Cagno — born in November 1940. Cagno was convicted for the May 1993 murder of James "Jimmy" Randazzo, alleged to be cooperating with authorities. Cagno was convicted in June 2004 for the murder and he was sentenced to life imprisonment. His brother, Rocco Cagno, testified in court that he and Aurelio had been active with the Colombo family since the early 1970s and both became soldiers in 1987.
- John "Jackie" DeRoss — born in July 1937. In November 1986, DeRoss was sentenced to 12 years in prison for extortion within the construction industry. DeRoss is a brother-in-law to Carmine Persico and served as underboss from 1999 to 2004. In February 2002, DeRoss was convicted of extortion, after Genovese family associate turncoat Michael D'Urso taped DeRoss confessing to conspiracy of obtaining 'protection money' from two deli supply companies, and he was sentenced to 7 years in prison. In February 2009, DeRoss was sentenced by former U.S. District Judge Joanna Seybert to life imprisonment for his participation in the May 1999 murder of Colombo family underboss, William "Wild Bill" Cutolo, and for witness tampering.
- Dino "Little Dino" Saracino — born in August 1972. In April 2014, Saracino was sentenced to 50 years in prison, after he was convicted in May 2012 for extortion, witness tampering and 2 murder conspiracies. According to prosecutors, Saracino engaged in racketeering conspiracy that spanned from between 1991 and 2008, and that he had sided with Carmine Persico during the 1990s Colombo family war, prosecutors also alleged that Saracino had participated in the August 1995 murder of Richard Greaves, the August 1997 murder of NYPD officer Ralph Dols, and the May 1999 murder of Colombo family underboss William "Wild Bill" Cutolo, as Cutolo was murdered in the basement of his home.
- Michael Sessa — born in October 1958. He is the younger brother to Carmine Sessa, whom was the consigliere for Carmine Persico during the late 1980s and into the early 1990s, he had played a key role during the Colombo family war in the early 1990s and he had admitted to participating in 13 murders during the war, before he defected as a government witness in November 1993. According to the testimony of former Colombo family associate and cooperating witness, Joseph Ambrosino, Sessa was inducted as a soldier for the Colombo family in December 1988, and in 1991, Sessa was promoted to acting captain replacing Robert Zambardi, and that he had sided with the Carmine Persico faction during the Colombo family war during the 1990s, also according to Ambrosino, Sessa and his crew were involved in murder, loansharking, firearm trafficking and fraudulent credit cards. In November 1992, Sessa was convicted of murder conspiracy, murder, racketeering, racketeering conspiracy and loansharking, and in May 1993, Sessa was sentenced by former U.S. District Judge Jack B. Weinstein to life imprisonment with a fine of $2 million.

=== Associates ===
- Lawrence "Larry" Persico — the son of former family boss Carmine Persico and brother to Alphonse Persico and Michael Persico. In 2004, Larry was indicted on racketeering charges. His father wrote a letter to the courts defending his son. Lawrence was sentenced on March 11, 2005, and released on December 9, 2005.
- Michael Joseph Persico — the son of imprisoned family boss Carmine Persico and brother to Alphonse Persico and Lawrence Persico. In 2010, Michael was accused of racketeering conspiracy involving debris removal contracts for the site of the former World Trade Center. In 2011, Michael was indicted for supplying firearms in the 1993 murder of Joseph Scopo.
- Sean Persico — the son of Theodore Persico and brother to Daniel, Frank, and Theodore Jr., Sean was involved in stock scams.
- Francesco "Frankie" Russo — the son of former Colombo captain Joseph "JoJo" Russo and grandson of Colombo boss Andrew "Mush" Russo. On August 13, 2020, an indictment charged Frankie Russo, Genovese family soldier Christopher Chierchio, attorney Jason "Jay" Kurland and securities broker Frank Smookler with conspiracy, wire fraud and money laundering. The indictment accused the "lottery attorney" Kurland along with Russo, Chierchio and Smookler with swindling $80 million of dollars from jackpot winners in an illegal scheme of siphoning money from the jackpot winners' investments.

== Former members ==
- Joe Greca (born on March 9, 1897) — former soldier. Greca was born in Sicily, and his family hailed from Sicily, he arrived in New York aboard the S.S. Canada ship and resided on 1st St in Brooklyn. By 1918, Greca was employed at the Wilder coal mining camp located in Russell County, Virginia. By 1920, Greca and his wife lived on 1277 64th St in Dyker Heights, Brooklyn. By 1929, his residence was on 1326 76th St. In July 1929, he was legally naturalized as a U.S. citizen. Greca may have had been inducted into the Colombo family as a member by the 1930s. By 1940, he was employed at the Damon Dress Company located on 148 W 37th St in Manhattan's Garment District. In 1944, Greca had interests at the F. & G. Dress Company located on 1452 86th St in Bath Beach. By 1946, he lived on 7806 New Utrecht Ave in Bensonhurst. By 1962, he was a member of the Salvatore Musacchio crew. By 1966, he was the President of the Dea Cerese Club located located on 6404 Bay Parkway in Mapleton, Brooklyn. In 1967, Greca moved from New York to Hollywood, Florida. He died in November 1978.
- Frank "Chickie" Leto (born on June 26, 1931) — former soldier. Leto was born in Brooklyn, and his family hailed from Sicily and Puglia, the Leto family resided on 411 E 63rd St in Lenox Hill, Manhattan, whilst he was a child, and later relocated on 623 Lincoln Ave. By 1950, Leto served as an assistant to a construction contractor. In December 1951, Leto enlisted in the U.S. Marines and was discharged in December 1953. By 1966, he was a member of the Local 37 Hod Carriers' Union in Brooklyn, and resided on 88-28 195th Place in Hollis, Queens, by 1968, and was the owner of a liquor store located on 2518 Linden Blvd in East New York. In June 1968, Leto was summoned to testify before the State Investigation Commission. In May 1976, Letto was involved in the bribery of Green Haven Prison guards on behalf of Edward Fanelli whom was serving a 20-year prison sentence for murder. In December 1980, Leto shot and wounded 19-year old Shamrock Gamble and 23-year old Jerome Lilly as the pair had attempted to rob a store in East New York belonging to the family of Leto. Leto was inducted as a formal member of the Colombo family by the late 1980s, and had met John Gotti Jr. and Anthony Rotondo outside of the Bergen Hunt and Fish Club in Ozone Park, Queens, with Gotti explaining to Rotondo that Leto was "with Vic Orena". Leto was implicated by an informant that he had participated in the November 1989 murder of Thomas Ocera. By the 1990s, Leto was residing on Lodi Ct in Glen Cove, Long Island, and was a member of the Victor Orena Jr. crew by May 1991. Leto was involved in the extortion of Eliot Hurdy from between September 1997 and March 1999 for the sum of $25,000. By 1998, Leto was reporting to Colombo family capo, Frank Melia. In December 1998, Melia and Leto were involved in a debt worth approximately $400,000. In December 1999, Leto was indicted by the USAO SDNY, he pleaded guilty to extortion, and was sentenced to 18 months in prison in September 2002, he began his sentence at the FMC Devens, Massachusetts in October 2002. Leto was indicted in August 2003 for racketeering and was arraigned and remanded without bail at Nassau County Jail in September 2003, in June 2004, he was released on house arrest, the house arrest conditions were lifted in March 2007, and he stood trial at the USDC Central Islip, Long Island in February 2008 and was sentenced to 3 years of probation by February 2009. He died in December 2016.
- Frank "Frankie Highway" Tranquellino (born on September 5, 1930) — former soldier. Tranquellino was born in Brooklyn, and his family hailed from Campania, the Tranquellino family resided on 593 Carroll St in Park Slope, Brooklyn, whilst he was a child. In October 1951, he enlisted in the U.S. Army until September 1953. In 1954, he married Christina Plantamura in Brooklyn. In October 1971, he was arrested for an unknown charge. In December 1990, he was inducted as a formal member of the Colombo family. He died in September 1999.
- Joseph "Joe Legs" Legrano (born on February 13, 1942) — former soldier. Legrano was born in Manhattan, and his family hailed from Basilicata and Campania, the Legrano family resided on 56 Catherine St in Two Bridges, Lower Manhattan, his father and uncle operated the Steve's Meat Market. By 1959, the Legrano family lived on 37 Waterside St in New Dorp Beach. In May 1960, Legrano accidently hit a child with his vehicle whilst driving on New Dorp Lane, and was fined $2. In September 1960, Legrano crashed his car Dongan Hills. In March 1962, he was involved in a car accident on Drumgoole Rd in Pleasant Plains. In July 1962, he was arrested by the Staten Island Police Department for a malicious mischief charge, and was held on $100 bail. In September 1962, Legrano and Lawrence Chiarappo were arrested for disorderly conduct. In December 1962, he and Charles Milford were involved in an altercation with five other men. In July 1964, Legrano was arrested for fireworks violations, and more than 200 fire crackers were found in his vehicle. By 1965, Legrano resided on 382 Guyon Ave in Oakwood, Staten Island, and was employed with the Daric Construction Company in Manhattan. In November 1968, he and Jimmie Lee were arrested for illegal gambling charges following a raid by the NYPD located on 11 Harrison St in Port Richmond. In March 1969, Legrano was involved in an 10-minute police car chase, and was arrested for possession of illegal gambling record, promoting illegal gambling and traffic violations, he was held on $10,000 bail and charges was dismissed in October 1969. According to law enforcement in the early 1970s, Legrano collected money on behalf of Joseph "Joe the Cat" LaForte. By 1973, Legrano lived on 223 Canal St in Stapleton. In February 1973, he was arrested for smuggling by the NYPD's Bronx District Attorney's Squad along with Anthony Barlotta and Salvatore DiVito following a raid at a warehouse located on 289 E 139th St in Mott Haven, the Bronx, Legrano had allegedly offered the police a bribe of $13,000 to let them go, he was held on $50,000 bail. In February 1975, Legrano, Charles Panarella and John DeRoss were implicated as major smugglers within the New York area. By the 1980s, he was residing on 116 Dalton Ave in New Dorp, and later relocated on 8 Trent St in Great Kills. In June 1980, he was indicted by the US Attorney's Office in Virginia for racketeering and smuggling, and pleaded guilty to two counts in August 1980. Legrano was alleged to have participated in the November 1988 murder of Vincent "Jimmy" Angellino. In December 1988, Legrano was inducted as a formal member of the Colombo family. By 1991, Legrano was reporting directly to the William Cutolo crew. In June 1992, he was indicted by the FBI following the indictment by the US Attorney's Office for the Eastern District of New York, along with John Pate, Joseph SanGiorgio, Robert Donofrio, Joseph Legrano and Lawrence Micciolo, Legrano was apprehended by FBI agents whilst at a safehouse belonging to the Persico faction, firearms, bulletproof vests and scanners were also seized at the house, he pleaded guilty and in March 1993, he was sentenced to 97 months in prison with 3 years of supervised release and a fine of $25,000. By May 1993, he was incarcerated at the Federal Prisoners in Springfield, Missouri. In February 1994, he was indicted along with Rocco Cagno, Aurelio Cagno and Dennis DeLuci for racketeering, in particular for the November 1988 murder of Vincent Angellino. In November 1996, Legrano was sentenced to 25 years in prison and was transferred to the FCI Allenwood, Pennsylvania. He died in October 2017 whilst serving his sentence at the Federal Medical Center in Devens, Massachusetts.
- Dominic "Donnie" Somma (born on April 8, 1937) — former soldier. Somma was born at the Long Island College Hospital in Cobble Hill, Brooklyn, and the Somma family resided on 256 4th Ave in Park Slope, Brooklyn, whilst he was a child. In March 1954, he was first arrested by the NYPD for the possession of stolen property. By the early 1960s, Somma lived in Brighton Beach, Brooklyn, and was associated with John Coiro, Frank Melli and Robert Melli, Albert "Gooch" Mugnolo, Gabriel San Felice and Gabriel Scianna. In June 1963, he was questioned in relation to the murder of 50-year old Emil Colantuono whom was shot in the head near his home located on 7007 Narrows Ave in Bay Ridge, Brooklyn, Colantuono was killed as he had supported the rival faction headed by Joey Gallo, although another theory is that he was killed as a case of mistaken identity that he was mistook for being one of the Gallo brother's. In the summer of 1963, Somma and Gabriel San Felice allegedly shot up the Mickey's Bar in Brooklyn and stabbed an unknown individual at the bar. In around this time, he was also suspected of the assault of Gambino family soldier, Robert "Bobby Red" Crapanzano, at the Como Lounge in Brooklyn as Crapanzano was being disrespectful. In August 1963, he was arrested by the NYPD for the possession of heroin, in November 1963, he pleaded guilty to the drug charge and was sentenced to the maximum of 36 months in prison at the New York State Prison, whilst on bail in December 1963, he was accused of shooting up the Illusion Bar located on New Utrecht Ave, with Gabriel San Felice, Somma began serving his sentence for the heroin possession charge at Sing Sing prison in February 1964. In 1970, he was arrested twice by the NYPD for possession of stolen property, possession of burglar tools and for drunk driving. By 1972, Somma resided on 12 Frederick Place in Old Bridge in New Jersey, and was employed with the Sonny's Transmission Service located on Cropsey Ave in Gravesend, Brooklyn. In February 1972, Somma and John Coiro had their stolen vehicle stopped by law enforcement and were in the possession of burglar tools. In April 1972, Somma and Coiro were charged for the burglary of $35,000 from a Staten Island drug store, and weeks after, he was arrested for the theft of $150,000 in cash from a department store, and in May 1972, both cases were dismissed. By May 1973, Somma and Coiro were reporting directly to Colombo family capo, Dominick "Mimi" Scialo. By late 1973, the Scialo crew, including Somma, Coiro, Frank "Beansy" Melli, Harry "Junior" McGuire and Pasquale "Patty Box-Cars" Cosoleto, had reportedly carried out at least five burglaries, including the theft of a safe containing diamonds and precious metals from the M. A. Sherre Diamond Company in Lower Manhattan, which earned the gang from between $150,000 to $400,000, the crew were also alleged to have carried out several unsolved homicides, including the December 1973 murder of 33-year old Miguel Cosme at a social club in Coney Island, days later, the crew shot Lorenzo "Larry" Lampasi Jr. once in the chest, he had survived the ordeal, however in January 1974, he was strangled to death at the Otto's Social Athletic Club in Red Hook, Brooklyn, and his remains were discovered nine months later. In June 1974, Somma's associate, John Coiro, was killed by a shotgun blast in Bensonhurst, Brooklyn, along with Gaetano "Tommy" Barbusca, and both men were killed by Vittorio "Vic" Amuso. In 1976, Somma was inducted as a formal member of the Colombo family, and began operating illegal gambling operations in Manhattan and Brooklyn with Joseph "Minx" Livoti. In February 1977, Somma owned the Flip Side bar located on 3th Ave and 70th St in Dyker Heights, Brooklyn. By September 1977, Somma was a member of the Anthony Scarpati crew. In February 1978, Somma was operating illegal gambling operations at a social club located on 18th Ave and 78th St in Bensonhurst. In May 1978, another of Somma's associates, Gabriel San Felice, was shot in the head and killed. In July 1978, Somma served as the driver in the getaway car during the murder of Gambino family associate, John Suarato, in Bay Ridge, Brooklyn, Patsy "Junior" Palermo and Vincent "Vinny" Palermo were the shooters, and according to information by Vincent Palermo in 2000, he had implicated Somma as the driver. In August 1980, Somma, Gregory Scarpa Jr. and Carmine Sessa had partnered together in a failed bank robbery in Queens, Somma was ordered to be killed by Greg Scarpa Sr. after Somma was criticising his son that Scarpa Jr. had allowed a security guard to walk into the bank during the robbery. In late August 1980, Scarpa Sr. shot Somma as soon as he had entered the Wimpy Boys Social Club in Brooklyn, also present during the murder were Sessa, Joseph "Joe Brewster" DeDomenico, Costabile "Gus" Farace and Robert Zambard.
- Aniello Giannattasio (born on December 25, 1909) — former capo. Giannattasio was born in Brooklyn, and his family hailed from Campania, the Giannattasio family resided on 647 Union St in Gowanus, Brooklyn, whilst he was a child. By 1940, he lived on 137 Garfield Place in Park Slope. By 1940, he worked with the M.E.H. Amusement Corporation located on 49 4th Ave in Park Slope. By 1941, he was employed with the Terminal Theatre located on 4th Ave and Dean St in Boerum Hill. In June 1941, he was arrested by the NYPD's 78th Squad in Brooklyn for assault and robbery, he pleaded guilty to robbery in September 1941 and was sentenced to the maximum of 10 years in prison at the New York State Prison, and was released in July 1945 from Sing Sing prison, he returned to prison for a parole violation in May 1948 and was released in May 1950. By 1950, he resided on 351 1st St in Park Slope and was employed with the Royal Wood Products Manufacturing Company located on 2nd Ave. Giannattasio may have had been inducted into the Colombo family as a member by the early 1950s. Giannattasio had sponsored Carmine Persico for membership during the 1950s. By 1958, he was a member of the Harry Fontana crew. In February 1959, he was arrested by the NYPD's 78th Squad for vagrancy, and was later acquitted. In October 1964, he was indicted along with John Capichano, Carmine Persico, Hugh "Apples" McIntosh, Dominick "Donnie Shacks" Montemarano, Theodore "Teddy" Persico and Joseph Sciannameo, for operating an illegal gambling den located on 339 7th St in Park Slope. By 1965, he was reporting to the Nicholas Forlano crew. By 1972, he resided on 649 E 24th St in South Midwood, Brooklyn, or possibly on East 21st Street or East 24th Street between Glenwood and Farragut Street in Brooklyn. By July 1973, Giannattasio was promoted to the position of acting capo of the Alphonse Persico crew, and by November 1975, he was an official captain, and was demoted to the position of soldier by August 1976. He died in August 1979.
- Bartolo Ferrigno (born on November 1, 1903) — former soldier. Ferrigno was born in Sicily, and he immigrated to the United States in 1914. In January 1927, he was arrested by the NYPD's 6th Squad in Manhattan for extortion, and the case was later dismissed. In October 1929, he married Maria Piazza in Brooklyn. In May 1930, he was arrested by the NYPD's 82nd Precinct in Brooklyn for felonious assault and for the possession of a firearm, and the case was dismissed in June 1930. In November 1930, his brother, Steve Ferrigno and Manfredi "Al" Mineo, the boss of the future Gambino family, were shot and killed outside of the Alhambra Apartments located on 50–760 Pelham Parkway South in the Bronx, by gunmen enlisted from Salvatore Maranzano. By 1935, Ferrigno and his wife resided on 1778 63rd Street, and he was employed at the Imperial Meat Market located on 182 1st Ave in East Village, Manhattan. In September 1938, he was arrested in Manhattan for extortion, and the case was later dismissed. In September 1944, he and Vito Scaminaci were arrested for the illegal possession of around 350,000 food ration stamps, and the case was dismissed. In February 1951, he was arrested by the US Attorney's Office in Manhattan for a heroin charge. In November 1962, Ferrigno was legally naturalized as a U.S. citizen at a court in Brooklyn. He died in October 1985.
- Dominico "Big Danny" Esposito (born on March 15, 1925) — former soldier. Esposito was born in Brooklyn, and his family hailed from Sicily and Campania, the Esposito family resided on 104 Butler St in Carroll Gardens, Brooklyn, whilst he was a child. During World War 2, Esposito enlisted in the Marines. In July 1946, he was arrested by the NYPD's 60th Squad in Brooklyn for an attempted house burglary. In October 1946, he was sentenced to an unknown duration to serve a sentence for burglary at the Elmira Correctional Facility. It is believed that Esposito was inducted as a formal member of the Colombo family by 1958. By 1962, he resided on 1488 East 91st St in Canarsie, Brooklyn. In November 1962, he was arrested by the NYPD's 61st Squad for assault, conspiracy and robbery, and the case was dismissed in January 1963. By 1976, Esposito and his wife and children moved to Norfolk, Virginia, located on 7431 Spartan Ave, Esposito owned the Maritime Services Incorporated ship cleaning company located on 237 West 4th Street and also ran a bail bond business in Fort Lauderdale, Florida. In April 1981, he was indicted by the US Attorney's Office for the Eastern District of Virginia for five counts of income tax evasion by failing to report income totaling over $69,000, he was released from prison in March 1991. He died in March 2004.
- Paolo "Paul" D'Amico (born on February 18, 1914) — former acting capo. D'Amico was born in Palermo, and before his birth, the D'Amico family lived in New Castle, Pennsylvania. In 1936 or 1937, he had served in the Italian Army. In November 1937, he married Providenza Carcione in Bagheria, Italy. In March 1947, D'Amico arrived in New York aboard the S.S. Marine Shark ship, and resided on 3313 Fish Ave in Laconia, the Bronx. In October 1947, D'Amico operated a bakery located on 963 East 233rd St in Wakefield until his departure in February 1951. By 1948, he resided on 819 East 232nd St in Wakefield. In October 1950, he was arrested by the NYPD for felonious assault after he shot an unnamed man during a fight, and the case was dismissed in November 1950. In January 1951, D'Agati was indicted by the Bronx County District Attorney's Office for the possession of a firearm and was sentenced to 2 years of probation. By 1951, he was employed at the Prestano Bakery located on 4231 White Plains Rd in Wakefield. In September 1954, he opened the Rosalia Bakery at 157 Ave O in Bensonhurst until he left the business in 1969. In August 1959, he resided on 2041 65th St in Mapleton, Brooklyn. By 1962, he was a crew member of the Simone Andoline faction within the Colombo family. In December 1963, he was legally naturalized as a U.S. citizen at the US District Court in Brooklyn. By February 1974, D'Agati was promoted to the position of acting capo of the Dominick Scialo crew, and D'Agati was replaced by Vincent Mucde by May 1974. He died in August 2002.
- Jerome "Gene Magliocco" D'Agati (born on May 19, 1920) — former soldier. D'Agati was the in-law to the blood families of the Profaci, Badalamenti and Magliocco families. D'Agati was born in Palermo. In December 1920, D'Agati and his family arrived in New York aboard the S.S. Dante Alighieri ship and resided on 512 4th Ave in Gowanus, Brooklyn. In late December of 1920, his father had shot and killed his mother after an argument, and his grandfather shot and killed his father. By 1930, D'Agati resided on 279 Bay 11th St in Bath Beach, Brooklyn. By 1941, D'Agati worked at the Sunland Beverage Corporation located located on 125 Lawrence Ave in Parkville, Brooklyn. In November 1942, he enlisted for active duty at the Camp Upton, New York and was honorably discharged from the US Army as Staff Sergeant at Fort Dix, New Jersey, in November 1945. In September 1943, he was legally naturalized as a U.S. citizen at court in Cumberland County in Fayetteville, North Carolina. In December 1947, he married Marie Badalamenti in Brooklyn. By 1950, D'Agati had resided on 268 Bay 17th St in Bath Beach, and was employed as the traffic manager at a liquor wholesale business in Parkville. By 1957, D'Agati was a formal member of the Colombo family. By late 1957, he resided on 8874 15th Ave in Bath Beach and was employed as the Alpine Wine and Liquor Company's General Manager. By the 1960s, D'Agati may have had reported directly to Colombo family captain, Salvatore "Sam" Badalamenti, and he had reported to Simone "Sam" Andolino by 1965. In June 1969, D'Agati opened the Acorn Trucking located on 868 Broadway in Bayonne, New Jersey. By May 1972, D'Agati left the Alpine Wine and Liquors, and became a salesman for the Capitol Distributors located on 48-10 31st St in Maspeth, Queens. By 1975, he had been transferred to the Vincent Gugliaro crew, and by 1981, he was assigned to the Anthony Scarpati crew, and reported to the Anthony Russo crew by 1991. He died in June 2001.
- Fred Clemenza (born on May 4, 1923) — former soldier. Clemenza was born in Brooklyn located on 743 Park Ave in Bedford-Stuyvesant, and his family hailed from Sicily. In 1942, Clemenza was employed with the U.S. Navy Yard in Fort Greene, Brooklyn, and served in the U.S. Army from between 1943 until October 1944. By 1950, he had resided on 4812 Ave J in Flatlands, Brooklyn and was a registered salesman at a ladies blouse factory. By 1954, he was the President of the Star Blouse Company located on 810 Broadway in Williamsburg, Brooklyn. By 1958, Clemenza and his brother, James Clemenza, were inducted as members of the Colombo family and were reporting directly to Colombo family captain, John Oddo. By 1963, Clemenza and his brother were partnered in the Reo Realty company which dealt in commercial properties and the company had once made $20,000 from one single building, and with a construction firm located on 5006 Ave D in Flatbush, Brooklyn. In August 1965 and April 1966, Clemenza had his vehicle traffic stopped by the police. By 1969, he had been elected as the Vice-President of the Local 1175 Material Yard Workers union headquartered on 101 W 17th St in Chelsea, Manhattan. In October 1976, Clemenza was reported by an FBI informant that he had recently operated a high stakes gambling game in a social club located on 86th Street and New Utrecht Avenue. Clemenza died in December 1980.
- Joseph "Joe Black" Gargone — former soldier. Gargone was born in Manhattan, his family hailed from Campania, and his father was a barber, tailor and salesman before his death in 1936. Gargone was first arrested in June 1943 for felonious assault and was sentenced to 3 years of probation. Gargone served in the U.S. Army for two months in 1945 from between February and April. In August 1945, he was arrested by the NYPD in Manhattan along with Rocco Mari and Michael Piermontese for burglary and for the possession of a switchblade, in particular, he was accused of stealing $5000 worth of clothing from the Mayo Brothers Textile Plant located on 428 Canal Street near Broadway, and in September 1945, the case was dismissed. In September 1949, Gargone was shot in the throat by the NYPD after he had stabbed two unknown individuals, he was charged with felonious assault and was given an suspended sentence. In July 1954, he waas arrested with Michael Caggiano for grand larceny, burglary and for the possession of burglar tools, he was released on $5000 bond. By 1960, Gargone and his family resided on 142 Sullivan Street in SoHo, Manhattan, and was employed with the Local 20 Cement and Concrete Workers Union headquartered at 207 E 84th St in Yorkville. In October 1966, he was arrested with Joseph Ruggiero for illegal gambling and conspiracy. By 1967, he lived on 59 Inwood Place in Elmwood Village, Buffalo, New York. In late September of 1967, he was arrested by the New York State Police for possession of barbiturates and for the possession of stolen property, law enforcement had sized 3 rifles and 14 handguns in his vehicle. In December 1967, he was indicted for four counts of stolen property, and was sentenced to 5 years of probation in March 1969. In October 1972, Gargone appeared before the Manhattan Supreme Court for refusal to testify before a Grand Jury investigating the April 1972 murder of Joseph Gallo. In December 1972, he was indicted by the Manhattan District Attorney's Office along with Philip "Foongi" Gambino, Alfonse "Sonny Red" Indelicato and Dominick "Big Trin" Trinchera for criminal contempt and perjury. In May 1974, he was sentenced to 5 years of probation for the Gallo contempt case. By 1975, Gargone was identified as an associate of Vincent Gigante and Matthew Ianniello. In February 1976, he was inducted as a formal member of the Colombo family. According to information by Phil Leonetti, Gargone had met with Nicky Scarfo Sr., Joseph Todaro and Joseph Todaro Jr. and Leonetti at the Diplomat Resort and Country Club in Hollywood, Florida, in January 1986, and it was ruled during the meeting that Scarfo would enlist Jerry Blavat to help Gorgone's son obtain a union job with the stagehands in New York. During the early 1990s, Gargone had operated a social club in Little Italy, Manhattan, and by 1999, Gargone often frequented a social club in Gravesend belonging to Benjamin "Benji" Castellazzo. He died in November 2010.
- Anthony "Tony Lap" LaPonzina (born on February 6, 1918) — former soldier. LaPonzina was born in Brooklyn, and his family hailed from Sicily and Campania, and were residing on 6511 11th Ave in Dyker Heights, Brooklyn, whilst he was a child, and by 1925, the family lived on 953 68th St. In May 1925, his father became legally naturalized in the US District Court in Brooklyn. In January 1943, he married Evelyn Olsen in Brooklyn, and by 1950, the couple were residing on 969 68th St in Dyker Heights. By the 1950s, LaPonzina and his three brother's were active in illegal gambling in Brooklyn. In December 1954, LaPonzina served as the driver of an armed robbery and stole $100 in cash and $7000 worth of jewellery. In February 1955, LaPonzina was arrested for illegal gambling by the NYPD. In 1956, he became a formal member of the Colombo family and was reporting directly to Colombo family captain, Nicolino "Nick" Sorrentino. In July 1957, he was arrested for illegal gambling. In January 1961, LaPonzina was arrested by the NYPD's Criminal Investigation Squad in Manhattan for consorting, conspiracy and illegal gambling, along with Nicholas "Jiggs" Forlano, Carmine "Junior" Persico, Joseph "Joe Yak" Yacovelli, Albert "Blast" Gallo, Milton Wekar, Charles "Ruby" Stein and Philip "Fat Foongie" Gambino, LaPonzina was acquitted. According to information from an FBI confidential informant, LaPonzina was a member of the Local 3108 of the Bowling Alley Employees Union. In 1962, LaPonzina operated a car wash located on 7th Ave in Brooklyn or on 39th Street and 5th Avenue, and was also heavily involved in illegal gambling in around this time. By 1963, LaPonzina resided on 1429 Shore Parkway in Bath Beach, Brooklyn, and owned the T & T Auto Laundry. In December 1967, LaPonzina was surveilled attending the wedding of the daughter of Colombo family boss, Joseph Colombo, in Queens Terrace Caterers in Woodside, Queens, along with Sam DeCavalcante and Carlo Gambino. In June 1970, LaPonzina was indicted for criminal contempt by the Brooklyn District Attorney's Office, along with Natale "Joe Diamond" Evola, Aniello "Mr. Neil" Dellacroce, Philip "Rusty" Rastelli, Nicholas Bianco, James "Jimmy Brown" Failla, Salvatore "Sally Fruits" Ferrugia, Francesco "Cheech" Rizzo, Jerome "Jerry" Asaro, Dominick Castore, Francesco Crociata, Pietro "Skinny Pete" Crociata, Alphonse "Funzi" D'Ambrosio, Vincent "Boozy" DeCicco, Anthony "Tony Lee" Guerrieri, Anthony Leone, Philip Modica, Rosario "Sally Burns" Morale, Anthony "Fat Andy" Ruggiano, Michael Sabella, Paul Sciacca, Dominick Scialo, George Tropiano, Benedetto "Benny" Aloi, Anthony "Bim" Bonacci, Gerald "Jerry" Chilli, Joseph Corozzo, James "Jimmy Legs" Episcopia, Vito Grimaldi and Peter Monteleone. By 1972, he resided on 3 Madison St in Smithtown, Long Island. In October 1972, LaPonzia was subpoenaed by the FBI to appear before Eastern District of New York Federal Grand Jury. In December 1972, LaPonzina was arrested for an unknown charge. In May 1973, he was arrested by the USAO in Brooklyn for illegal gambling. By 1973, LaPonzina was reporting to Colombo family captain, Charles Panarella. He died in November 1976.
- Louis Barbusca (born on January 7, 1901) — former soldier. Barbusca was born in Sicily. Barbusca arrived in New York aboard the S.S. Presidente Wilson ship in July 1920 and resided on 6710 14th Ave in Dyker Heights, Brooklyn, and relocated on 7322 15th Ave in Bensonhurst by 1927. In January 1927, Barbusca married Mariannina Greca in Brooklyn and the couple resided on 1604 70th in Bensonhurst. In September 1931, Barbusca was arrested by the NYPD's 68th Precinct for murder, and was acquitted in November 1931. It is believed Barbusca was inducted as a formal member of the Colombo family by the 1930s. In November 1934, Barbusca was arrested by the NYPD 66th Pct Brooklyn for grand larceny, and was acquitted in January 1935. By the late 1930s, Barbusca was a member of the Local 89 International Garment Workers Union and was also employed at the Apex Dress Company in the Garment District in Manhattan. In June 1945, he was legally naturalized. In January 1957, Barbusca and his son, Gaetano Barbusca, had owned property in Brooklyn. By the 1960s, Barbusca was employed at the Sarah Lee Dress Company located on 8208 17th Ave in Bensonhurst. By 1962, Barbusca was reporting to Salvatore "Sally the Sheik" Musacchio, a captain in the Colombo family. In November 1964, Barbusca was interrogated by the FBI and denied his affiliation with the American Mafia. In 1966, Barbusca was a member of the Joint Board of Dress and Waist Worker's Union of Greater New York. According to information by a confidential informant, Barbusca's son, Louis Barbusca, had operated Joseph Colombo's numbers operation. In June 1974, Louis Barbusca, his son, was shot and killed along with John Coiro outside of a bakery shop located on 1729 86th St near Bay 16th St in Bensonhurst, following a dispute between Coiro and Alphonse "Allie Boy" Persico, it is believed the contract on Coiro was farmed to Chris "Christy Tick" Furnari, whom is best known as the later consigliere of the Lucchese family during the 1980s and 1990s, Furnari had tasked the contract to Anthony "Gaspipe" Casso and Vittorio "Little Vic" Amuso, both men would later lead the Lucchese family as the underboss and boss, respectively, Amuso had caught Coiro in the company of Louis Barbusca and walked up to both men and killed them with a shotgun blast. He died in March 1971 after accidentally falling off the roof of his home in Bensonhurst.
- Anthony "Abbey" Abbatemarco (born on April 6, 1922) — former underboss. Abbatemarco was born in Brooklyn, and his family hailed from Campania, the Abbatemarco family resided on 327 2nd St in Park Slope, Brooklyn. In October 1928, Abbatemarco's uncle, Michele Abbatemarco, was shot and killed inside of his vehicle located on 2421 83rd St in Gravesend. By the 1940s, Abbatemarco resided on 485 3rd St. In September 1942, he enlisted in the U.S. Marine Corp and served in the Pacific Theatre at Guadalcanal, Bouganville and Guam. In 1945, he married Lucille Giordano in Carroll Gardens, Brooklyn. It is believed that Abbatemarco became associated with the Colombo family by the early 1950s. In March 1952, he was arrested for illegal gambling in Brooklyn, among the arrested included Carmine "Junior" Persico, Joseph Gallo, Lawrence "Larry" Gallo and Charles Brown. In June 1952, he pleaded guilty and was sentenced to 9 months in prison at the Rikers Island prison. In 1956 or 1957, Abbatemarco and Joe Profaci presided over a ceremony which saw Anthony Abbatemarco, Lawrence Gallo and Salvatore "Sally D" D'Ambrosio become members of the Colombo family. In February 1959, Abbatemarco was dismissed for illegal gambling. By the late 1950s, Abbatemarco was reporting to Colombo family captain, Harry Fontana. In November 1959, his uncle, Frank "Frankie Shots" Abbatemarco, was shot and killed by two gunmen inside of Cardello's Tavern located on 256 4th Ave in Park Slope. In 1961, he was arrested for consorting in Brooklyn. By the early 1960s, Abbatemarco aligned with the Joe Gallo which opposed Colombo family boss, Joe Profaci. In August 1961, he was arrested for attempted murder, and was released two days later. In October 1961, he was arrested by the NYPD along with John Cutrone, Leonard Dello, Joseph Gallo, Lawrence Gallo, Vincent "Vinny Sicilian" Gugliaro, Joseph "Junior Lollipop" Carna, Lawrence "Big Lollipop" Carna, Salvatore "Sally Boy" Mangiameli, Vincent Regina and Alfonso "Peanuts" Serrantonio, law enforcement had seized one carbine rifle, one shotgun and two rifles, he was held on $25,000 bail. In November and December of 1961, Abbatemarco was arrested by the NYPD's 84th Squad for consorting, and was acquitted in January 1962. In January 1962, Abbatemarco, Leonard Dello, Larry Gallo, John Commarato, Albert "Kid Blast" Gallo, Frank "Punchy" Illiano and Alfonso Serrantonio had rescued a group of 6 children from a fire in Red Hook. In March 1962, Abbatemarco and James Cardello were arrested for consorting, the case was dismissed in April 1962. According to information from an confidential informant in August 1962, Abbatemarco and Albert Gallo were the leaders of the Gallo gang, based in President Street, and broke from the crew in October 1962, and information by an FBI informant in December 1962, stated that there were four groups in Brooklyn, headed by Abbatemarco, the Gallo crew and by Nicholas Forlano and Carmine Persico. In February 1963, Abbatemarco, Carmine Persico, Vincent Regina and Hugh McIntosh were arrested for consorting. In August 1963, Abbatemarco's uncle and loyalist, James Cardello was shot and killed inside of his vehicle whilst at a stoplight in Bay Ridge, Brooklyn, hours later, Gallo crew loyalist, Louis "Cadillac Lou" Mariani, was shot to death in Suffolk County, Long Island, Anthony Regina and John "Moose" Battista were later convicted of this murder. According to the NYPD in July 1964, Abbatemarco had moved his headquarters to the Park East Tavern on Utica Avenue and Eastern Parkway in Brooklyn. By the 1960s, Abbatemarco lived on Wood St near Mohegan Lake in Yorktown, Westchester County. By January 1965, Abbatemarco was transferred from reporting to Salvatore Mineo to the Carmine Persico faction, a Colombo family capo at the time. In February 1965, according to the FBI, Abbatemarco was one of the most prominent loanshark's within the Brooklyn area. In December 1965, Abbatemarco was arrested for consorting following a raid on Kee's Restaurant located on 2026 Church Ave in Flatbush, Brooklyn, among the arrested also included Charles Bradley, Morris Green and Henry Lopez. In July 1967, he was arrested by the NYPD 71st Pct Brooklyn for an unknown warrant. By July 1972, Abbatemarco's residence was on 1126 83rd St in Dyker Heights, Brooklyn. By October 1972, the FBI surveilled and became to know that Abbatemarco was a close associate of Gennaro Langella, whom later became the acting boss of the family during the 1980s. In November 1972, Abbatemarco was surveilled attending the funeral of the daughter of Genovese family soldier, Ralph "Tattles" Polizio. Following the promotion of new boss, Tom DiBella, in the early 1970s, Abbatemarco became the new underboss for the family. It is noted that Salvatore Albanese became Abbatemarco's driver and bodyguard. According to law enforcement, Abbatemarco may have had been involved in the January 1974 murder of Dominick Scialo, whom his body was discovered nine months later, it is believed Scialo had drunkenly offended Gambino family namesake and boss, Carlo Gambino. In around July 1974, several informants colluded that Abbatemarco supervised the rackets on behalf of DiBella, including illegal gambling, loansharking, smuggling, narcotics, and the infiltration of labor unions and private sanitation businesses. In July 1974, Abbatemarco became the acting boss of the family following DiBella's surrender to US Marshals to begin serving a six-month sentence for contempt. He died in July 2005.
- Frank "Gandy" LoCicero (born on January 1, 1927) — former acting captain. LoCicero was born in Brooklyn, and his family hailed from Sicily, LoCicero's father, Calogero "Charlie Sidge" LoCicero, served as the acting consigliere for the family during the early 1960s under Colombo family boss, Joe Profaci, Calogero was shot and killed in April 1968 by his son, Frank LoCicero, LoCicero's younger brother, Benjamin "Benny Sidge" LoCicero, later served as a captain in the Colombo family. The LoCicero family resided on 6516 66th St in Dyker Heights, Brooklyn, whilst LoCicero was a child. In October 1948, LoCicero was first arrested by the State Police in Conowingo, Maryland for larceny and was sentenced to 30 days suspended sentence. In September 1957, LoCicero was arrested for the possession of a firearm. By the late 1950s, it is believed Frank LoCicero and Benny LoCicero were inducted as members in the Colombo family and were reporting to their father whom was a captain in the 1950s, also members in the crew included Rosario "Black Sam" Nastasa, Salvatore and Gregory Scarpa Sr. and Anthony "Tony Skee" and Vincent "Jimmy Skee" Scianna. In November 1958, LoCicero was arrested for burglary, and was sentenced to over 12 years in prison, whilst the case was pending appeal, LoCicero resided on 8645 14th Ave in Bath Beach, Brooklyn. In September 1959, LoCicero and Frank DeSisto were arrested by the FBI for theft from interstate shipment which accused the pair of stealing $50,000 of Japanese silk, and both men were acquitted. In November 1959, LoCicero was arrested by the NYPD in Brooklyn for larceny, robbery, kidnapping and assault. According to the NYPD in March 1960, Calogero LoCicero had participated in at least 14 unsolved homicides. In September 1960, LoCicero was arrested by the NYPD for burglary, and began serving a prison sentence of 10 years at Sing Sing prison for the November 1958 burglary charge, and by May 1961, he was serving his sentence at Green Haven Prison in Stormville, New York. In around May 1964, LoCicero was transferred from the Harry Fontana crew and instead reported to Joe Colombo whom became the new family boss in April 1964. LoCicero was released from prison by July 1965 and reported to Colombo family capo, Frank Fusco. According to information by Gregory Scarpa Sr. in August 1965, LoCicero was involved in the construction which he gained entry from Charles Panarella. By March 1966, LoCicero was reported to have been heavily involved in loansharking within the Brookyln area. In June 1966, an informant implicated LoCicero in the hijacking of 1000 cases of Scotch whisky. In July 1966, LoCicero was arrested for parole violation and his initial sentence of 10 years in prison was reduced to 7 years in prison, and was released in April 1968. LoCicero was alleged to have participated in the attempted murder of an unknown individual in May 1968. By 1971, he was residing on 1300 Richmond Ave in Graniteville, Staten Island. In May 1971, LoCicero opened a new social club located on 11th Ave between 67th and 68th Street's in Dyker Heights. In February 1972, LoCicero was arrested for larceny and was convicted in August 1973 and fined $250. In February 1973, LoCicero was arrested by the New Jersey State Police in New Brunswick for smuggling, and was sentenced to 6 months in prison with a fine of $500. In April 1973, LoCicero was implicated by a confidential informant for operating an high stakes gambling game at the Meadowlark Social Club located on 8th Ave in Dyker Heights, along with George Tropiano and William Cutolo. By 1974, LoCicero was reporting to Colombo family capo, Charles Panarella. By 1974, he had moved to Jules Drive in Graniteville, and in January 1974, he was arrested by the NYPD during an illegal gambling raid held in the basement located on 6320 Ave N in Mill Basin, Brooklyn. In February 1975, the FBI found $2,000 in cash in his possession found on person. By July 1975, LoCicero was promoted as the acting captain for the Vincent Gugliaro crew. In October 1975, he was sentenced by former U.S. District Judge Mark Americus Costantino to 18 months in prison for fraud, he began his sentence in February 1976 at the USP Leavenworth in Kansas, whilst in prison, he was arrested for larceny in Nassau County, and by January 1976, he was released from prison. In May 1977, he was arrested by the NYPD for illegal gambling and possession of paraphernalia. In December 1977, he was arrested by the Nassau County Police Department for larceny and was fined $500. By January 1979, he was moved to the Aniello Giannattasio crew, and later served as the acting captain for the Giannattasio crew. In May 1984, he was indicted along with Lucchese family soldier, Louis "Louie Beans" Foceri, and LoCicero was accused of the December 1983 theft of $613,700 worth American Express Travelers Checks from Newark Airport, he was released on $50,000 bond and was sentenced to 6 years in prison, he began serving his sentence in May 1985 at the Federal Prison Camp in Big Spring, Texas, he was released from prison in March 1989. By 1991, he was reporting to Vincenzo Aloi, a captain in the Colombo family. By the 1990s Colombo family war, LoCicero had sided with the Vic Orena faction which had opposed the Carmine Persico faction, the FBI had warned to LoCicero that he had a murder contract placed on his life at least twice. According to the FBI in 1999, LoCicero had retired to Florida, and that by February 1999, his younger brother was an acting captain in the family and was heavily involved in illegal gambling, loansharking and extortion. He died in August 2011.
- Paul Lombardino (born on September 20, 1904) — former soldier. Lombardino was born in Sicily, and arrived in New York aboard the S. S. Duca D'Aosta ship. In July 1925, he married Christine Balsamo, and by 1930, Lombardino and his wife were residing on 44 Stewart Ave in Irvington, New Jersey. By 1933, he and his wife lived on 187 Westervelt Ave in North Plainfield, and around this time, he owned the Lombardino-Balsamo Bread Company in Newark. In March 1933, Lombardino and Anthony Dideo were arrested for illegal gambling and were in possession of "50 illegal lottery numbers book". In July 1933, Lombardino, Jennie Pizzolato, Rose Lombardino and Benjamin Pizzolato were arrested for conspiracy to defraud, Lombardino was arrested by the North Plainfield Police Department and was accused of defrauding $6000 from Katherine Schilling, he was released on $2,500 bail. By the 1940s, Lombardino operated a grocery store located on 5th Avenue and Fairmount Street in Newark. In January 1944, he was legally naturalized. In February 1947, Lombardino was arrested for operating an unregistered alcohol still in Dayton during a raid by the New Jersey State Alcoholic Beverage Control, along with Thomas Marino, George Antal and Joseph Savittieri whom were also arrested. By the 1950s, he was employed as a clerk with the Ferrugia Grocery, and by June 1956, he was employed with the Real Bread Company. By 1959, Lombardino lived on 66 Smith St in Lower Vailsburg, Newark and was a member of the Local 342 Bricklayers Union and retired in 1981, and by the 1960s, Lombardino was employed at several companies, including Underhill Construction in Queens, Arthur Venerri Company in New Jersey and Wigton Abbott Corporation also in New Jersey. In September and October 1964, Lombardino had denied twice that he was affiliated with the American Mafia during interrogations by the FBI in Newark. In May 1965, Lombardo was surveilled by the FBI attending the wedding of the daughter of Colombo family capo, Frank Fusco, located on Claridge Caterers at 631 Ave P in Gravesend, along with Joseph Colombo, Gregory Scarpa Sr., Salvatore Mineo, and Carmine Tramunti, among several others. By 1967, Lombardino served as a soldier in the crew headed by Colombo family capo, Joseph "Joe Yak" Yacovelli, other members of the crew included Emanuel Cammarata, Salvatore P. Cammarata, Salvatore Cannella, John D'Amico, Salvatore S. Profaci, Onofrio Sciortino, John Misuraca and Angelo Speciale. By 1974, he was employed at the Briscoe Construction Project underway at Newark Airport. He died in December 1998.
- Charles Lombardo (born on June 25, 1938) — former soldier. Lombardo was born in Brooklyn, and his family hailed from Calabria, and resided on 640 E 89th Street in Canarsie, Brooklyn, whilst Lombardo was a child. By October 1976, Lombardo lived on 1910 NW 47th Ave in Lauderhill, Florida. In October 1976, Lombardo surrendered to law enforcement for the theft of stolen cards and operated an stolen credit card ring and was partnered with Paul "Red" Stingo, and from between 1975 and 1976, the group purchased merchandise worth an estimated $1 million from the stolen credit cards which included appliances, cameras, radios and fishing rods which were sold at flea markets, Lombardo pleaded guilty and was sentenced to 3 years of probation. By the 1980s, Lombardo resided on 3700 Bayview Street in Seaford, Long Island. In July 1985, he was indicted along with Victor "Little Vic" Orena, John Ambrosio, Oscar Albenga, Robert "Bobby" Ross and Philip Yovanovich, by the Suffolk County District Attorney's Office for loansharking and were charging interest from between 130 percent to 160 percent, operating in Suffolk, Nassau and Queens, law enforcement had seized a handgun, two cars and $60,000 in cash, and bail was set for $20,000 for Lombardo. By May 1991, it is believed that Lombardo was a member of the Colombo family and was reporting directly to Vincenzo Aloi, a captain in the Colombo family, members of the Aloi crew also included Ralph Scopo Jr., Pasquale "Patty" Catalano, Dennis Guzzardo, Benjamin "Benny Sidge" LoCicero, Frank "Gandy" LoCicero and Charles Lombardo. By the 1990s Colombo family war, Lombardo was aligned with the Vic Orena faction which opposed the Carmine Persico faction. By 2001, Lombardo was named the acting consigliere for the Colombo family. He died in April 2004.
- Joseph "Chubby" Audino — soldier and Orena faction loyalist during the third Colombo war in the 1990s. In 1994, he was sentenced to 2 1/2 years imprisonment for tax fraud.
- Frank "Frankie Shots" Abbatemarco — was born in 1899 and grew up in Red Hook, Brooklyn. During the 1950s, Abbatemarco was a powerful capo in Profaci family controlling Red Hook. On November 4, 1959, Abbatemarco was murdered.
- Benedetto "Benny" Aloi – former capo and brother to Vincenzo Aloi. During the 1990s Third Colombo war, Aloi was Orena's underboss. In 1991, Aloi was convicted in the Windows Case, was released from prison on March 17, 2009. He died on April 7, 2011.
- Vincenzo "Vinny" Aloi — former soldier; born on September 22, 1933. In August 1973, Aloi was sentenced to 7 years in prison for perjury, after he allegedly lied to a grand jury investigating the April 1972 murder of Joey Gallo. In February 1974, Aloi was sentenced by former U.S. District Judge Whitman Knapp to 9 years in prison for stock-fraud, along with Johnny Dio, an infamous member of the Lucchese family. Aloi died in 2025.
- Salvatore "Sally Bread" Cambria — former capo and one-time street boss. In 2002, Cambria was identified as a soldier in the Colombo family, during the trial of Lucchese family consigliere Joseph "Joe C." Caridi, who had ordered a Freeport restaurant to buy bread from Cambria. Cambria died of natural causes on October 5, 2024, aged 73.
- Dominick "Little Dom" Cataldo — died in prison 1990.
- Antonio Cottone — deported to Sicily, where he became the Mafia boss of Villabate, the home town for the Profaci family. Cotonne was murdered in 1956.
- Salvatore "Sally" D'Ambrosio — During the 1960s First Colombo War, D'Ambrosio and future boss Carmine Persico attempted to murder mobster Larry Gallo. D'Ambrosio also participated in the murder of Joseph Gioelli.
- Leonard "Lenny Dell" Dello — was a former member of the Gallo crew. Dello died in 2009.
- Nicholas "Jiggs" Forlano — former capo who ran a loan-sharking operations with Charles "Ruby" Stein. In the 1970s, Forlano moved to Fort Lauderdale, Florida and started operating there. In 1977, Forlano died of a heart attack at the Hialeah race track in Florida.
- Carmine "Tutti" Franzese — former soldier. Franzese was born in Brooklyn on born on 25 January, 1932. By 1958, he was a Colombo family associate reporting to his uncle, John "Sonny" Franzese, a soldier under capo Salvatore "Sally Sheik" Musacchio. During the early 1960s, Franzese was allegedly a participant in the Gallo-Profaci war. In April 1960, Franzese was sentenced to six months in prison at Rikers Island for contempt after he and others were present when the NYPD raided a card game. By 1962, Franzese and Vincent "Big Lou" Russo were managing illegal gambling operations on behalf of Sonny Franzese. In December 1971, he was indicted along with Modesto "Duke" Santoro and Lazzaro SanGiovanni by the U.S. Attorney's Office in Manhattan for grand larceny, forgery, extortion and conspiracy, including the extortion of the Mobil Oil Corporation. In November 1973, Franzese stood trial for the Mobil Oil Corporation extortion, although the case was dismissed. In March 1976, Franzese was inducted into the Colombo family. In May 1976, Franzese shot and killed Joseph "Dodo" Pastore, with the assistance of Bonanno family member Joseph Massino. According to an FBI informant, Franzese, Anthony Augello and Modesto Santoro had kidnapped Pastore's half-brother, Richard Dorme, for a $150,000 two months before the Pastore murder. By March 1977, Franzese was reporting to the Andrew Russo crew, and by December 1977, he was reporting to Gennaro Langella. He died in December 1990.
- John "Sonny" Franzese — former underboss. He died at age 103 on February 24, 2020.
- Michael "Yuppie Don" Franzese — son of John Franzese. Michael organized a highly lucrative gasoline scam racket with the Russian mafia. Franzese was promoted to caporegime in 1980 and retired in 1995 after he was released from prison.
- Richard "Richie Nerves" Fusco — former consigliere. On January 20, 2011, Fusco was indicted on federal racketeering charges. On September 29, 2011, Fusco pleaded guilty to running a shakedown scheme against the Gambino family; he was sentenced to four months in prison. Fusco was incarcerated at the Metropolitan Detention Center in Brooklyn. Fusco died in September 2013.
- Pasquale "Patsy" Guariglia — former soldier. Guariglia was born in Brooklyn on November 18, 1914. In June 1931, he was sentenced to 20 years in prison at the Elmira Reformatory in Chemung County for the May 1931 robbery of a taxi driver and released in 1936. Guariglia was incarcerated at Attica State Prison between August 1938 and June 1941 for his involvement in the April 1936 murder of Julius Pulvino, who was shot four times in the head inside the kitchen of the White House Café in Bath Beach, Brooklyn, which was owned by Joseph SanFilippo and William Ricci. In March 1942, Guariglia was involved in an attempted robbery and the shooting of an NYPD lieutenant.
- Gennaro "Jerry Lang" Langella — former underboss and acting boss. Langella was born in Brooklyn on December 30, 1938. He was a lieutenant and top hitman for Carmine Persico, and allegedly participated in the April 1969 murder of Samuel Lessner, who was last seen entering a car with Langella, and the September 1969 killings of Salvatore "Sally" D'Ambrosio and Fred "Freddy Red" DeLucia, who were both lured to a social club in Brooklyn and beaten to death with hammers. According to information furnished to the FBI by a confidential informant in June 1972, Langella was involved in the murder of an unidentified Jewish male, who had been set to testify against Persico, several years prior. By 1976, Langella was reputedly in charge of a $100,000 a day football operation. By January 1977, Langella was promoted to capo of a crew which included Joseph Brancato, Salvatore Fusco, Joseph Peraino, Modesto Santoro, John "Johnny Green" Scimone and Thomas Spero. The Langella crew were allegedly responsible for the shooting of Samuel Zahlraban in September 1979. By October 1979, it is believed that Langella was appointed consigliere, and by January 1981, he was appointed underboss. By July 1981, Langella was promoted to acting boss. Langella was suspected of participating in the July 1981 murder of John Matera and the July 1981 killing of Robert "Bucky" DiLeonardo. Langella was also accused of plotting the February 1982 murder of Vincent Rizzo, who had pointed a gun towards Charles Panarella. In May 1984, Langella was surevilled at a Mafia Commission meeting located in Arrochar, Staten Island, along with Paul Castellano, Anthony Salerno, Salvatore "Tom Mix" Santoro, Ralph Scopo and Thomas Bilotti. In February 1985, he was indicted for racketeering, as part of the Commission case. In November 1986, Langella was sentenced to 65 years in prison, and by January 1987, Langella was sentenced to an additional 100 years in prison with a $250,000 fine. Langella died at the United States Medical Center for Federal Prisoners in Springfield, Missouri in December 2013.
- Ralph "Ralphie" Lombardo — former capo and acting consigliere. Lombardo runs bookmaking and loansharking activities on Long Island. In 1975, Lombardo was convicted of conspiracy of selling stock in an automobile leasing company in New Jersey. In 2003, Lombardo was the consigliere and he was indicted on illegal gambling, loan-sharking and witness tampering. He was released from prison on August 27, 2006. On July 29, 2022, Lombardo died.
- Dominic "Donnie Shacks" Montemarano — former soldier. He was released from prison in 1997, Montemarano moved to Los Angeles and has invested in movies. Montemarano died of COVID-19 in January 2021.
- Charles "Moose" Panarella — a hitman who spent time in Las Vegas. Declared mentally unfit for trial, under house arrest. He died on July 18, 2017.
- Anthony "Big Tony" Peraino — associate who helped finance groundbreaking adult entertainment movie "Deep Throat". Died of natural causes in 1996.
- Daniel "Danny" Persico — former soldier. Daniel Persico was the son of Theodore Persico Sr., brother to Carmine, Sean and Theodore Persico Jr., and nephew of Carmine Persico. In March 2000, Persico was arrested and later convicted on a pump and dump stock scam. He was released from prison on November 14, 2003. Persico died from colon cancer in June 2016, aged 54.
- Theodore "Teddy" Persico Sr. — former capo. Theodore Persico Sr. was brother to Carmine Persico, uncle of Alphonse "Little Allie Boy" Persico, and father to Theodore N. Persico Jr. He was a capo in Brooklyn during the 1970s, and served on the family ruling panel from the early 1990s until his arrest and conviction. Persico was released from prison on October 9, 2013. He died in 2017.
- Thomas Petrizzo — born in 1933 in Brooklyn. Petrizzo was the owner of 4 companies based in New Jersey which he had used to money launder through. In 1985 and 1986, he earned $2.1 million for storing, shaping and delivering steel bars from Milstein Properties. He had a strong influence in the labor unions, specifically the construction industry. Petrizzo provided the steel frames, columns and girders for the Jacob K. Javits Convention Center, Battery Park City projects, the new Federal courthouse in Foley Square and many Manhattan skyscrapers. He was promoted to capo during the late 1980s due to his influence in the unions and his multi-million dollar operations, however he was demoted in his old age as a result of power loss. In December 1993, he was arrested alongside 5 other Colombo members. The FBI alleged that he extorted $1.3 million from a Swiss engineering company and camouflaged the payoffs as consulting fees into his own businesses. He was arrested among numerous Colombo associates and members, including his former son-in-law Michael Persico, son of Carmine Persico. The scam consisted of placing vending machines inside Colombo family controlled car dealerships, Petrizzo was also charged with extorting construction debris removal unions at Ground Zero; he was acquitted. In 1996, he pleaded guilty to extortion. Petrizzo died on September 11, 2022.
- Vincent "Vinnie Unions" Ricciardo — former capo of a Long Island crew, Ricciardo took over John "Sonny" Franzese's old crew. He was part of the Orena faction during the Third Colombo War. On November 2, 1992, Ricciardo was shot and wounded in an ambush that killed Anthony Mesi and injured Paul Schiavo. He was indicted on September 14, 2021, along with several members of the family. On February 28, 2024, Ricciardo was sentenced to four years in federal prison on a racketeering conviction stemming from a labor union extortion scheme. In August 2024, Ricciardo was granted compassionate release from prison. Before he could be released, however, Ricciardo died in prison, on August 17, 2024, aged 78.
- Nicholas Rizzo — was a soldier operating in extortion and loan sharking rackets, in January 2011, the then 83 year old mobster had his first arrest on gambling charges. He was later convicted to 6 months in a medical facility, but given a humanitarian release. But a week later spotted in a social club ran by the Bonanno acting boss Vincent "Vinny T.V." Badalamenti. He died on May 26, 2022.
- Andrew "Mush" Russo — also known as "Andy Mush", "Mushy", was a longtime member of the family who served as boss following Carmine Persico's death. Russo's cousin was longtime Colombo family boss Carmine Persico In November 1986, Russo was sentenced to 14 years in prison. He was released on July 29, 1994, under special parole conditions. In August 1999, Russo was convicted of jury tampering and sentenced to 57 months, he was also sentenced to 123 months for both parole violation and his involvement in a racketeering case of a Long Island carting company. In March 2010, after his parole period expired, Russo became street boss. In January 2011, Russo was indicted on federal racketeering charges. On March 21, 2013, Russo was sentenced to thirty three months for racketeering. He was released from prison in 2013. Russo's cousin and longtime family boss Carmine Persico died on March 7, 2019, in prison. On September 14, 2021, Andrew Russo was indicted and identified as the official boss of the Colombo family. The indictment charged boss Russo along with underboss Benjamin Castellazzo, consigliere Ralph DiMatteo and three captains Theodore Persico Jr., Richard Ferrara and Vincent Ricciardo with infiltrating and taking control of a Queens-based labor union. Russo died of natural causes on April 18, 2022, while awaiting trial.
- Joseph "Jo Jo" Russo — the eldest son of Andrew Russo, convicted in 1994 with his cousin Anthony "Chuckie" Russo. Both men received life sentences after former FBI agent Lindley DeVecchio testified against them. In 2007, Joseph Russo died of kidney cancer in prison.
- Ralph "Little Ralphie" Scopo — influential soldier who ran the Cement Club. Died in prison 1993.
- Ralph Scopo Jr. — son of Ralph Scopo. Died under indictment for extortion in 2013.
- Ilario "Fat Larry" Sessa — former soldier. Sessa was born on December 21, 1966. He was a member of Carmine Persico's faction during the Third Colombo War of the early 1990s. Sessa died on March 6, 2026, aged 59.

== Former associates ==
- Nicholas "Nicky" Bianco — a Gallo crew member, Bianco later joined the Patriarca crime family. Bianco died in prison in 1994.
- Vincent Langella — the son of reputed Colombo crime family underboss Gennaro Langella, Vincent served 3 to 4 years in federal prison for his role in a $15 million Mafia pump and dump scheme. Vincent died in January 2015 from complications of the liver.
- Hugh "Apples" MacIntosh — a Scottish-American enforcer for Carmine Persico during the 1960s. In 1969, MacIntosh was imprisoned on hijacking charges. In 1975, he was released and went on to control several clubs and loan sharking rings for Persico. In 1982, McIntosh was caught bribing an Internal Revenue Service agent for Carmine Persico's early release. McIntosh was imprisoned after the Colombo trial and released on December 31, 1992. MacIntosh was later arrested for meeting with mobster Daniel Persico and was returned to prison. McIntosh died on November 10, 1997.
- Gerard Pappa — a family associate who transferred to become a soldier in the Genovese crime family working with Peter Saverio in the New York windows scheme. Was murdered in 1980 by the Cataldo brothers.
- Frank Persico — the son of Salvatore Persico, and cousin of acting Colombo boss Alphonse "Allie" Persico. Frank was a stockbroker who was sentenced to five years in prison for a $15 million stock swindle. Frank was released on July 12, 2006; four months later, Frank died of a heart attack.
- Michael "Mike Rizzi" Rizzitello — a Gallo crew member, later joined the Los Angeles crime family. He died in prison in 2005.
- Tony Sirico — an associate and enforcer for Carmine Persico throughout the 1960s and early 1970s. He was arrested 28 times during his mafia career, including for disorderly conduct, assault, and robbery. When the family opened its books in the 1970s, he was offered a promotion to be made, but he declined. While serving a sentence at the Sing Sing Correctional Facility, he was inspired by an acting troupe of ex-convicts to give acting a try. Since then, he has played gangster characters in numerous films and TV shows. His most acclaimed performance was as Paulie Gualtieri in the Emmy award-winning drama The Sopranos. Sirico died on July 8, 2022, at an assisted living facility in Fort Lauderdale, Florida.
- Charles "Ruby" Stein — "loanshark to the stars", was an associate and business partner to Nicholas Forlano. Stein ran gambling clubs on the Upper West Side of Manhattan. In the early 1970s, Irish mobster Jimmy Coonan became Stein's bodyguard. Coonan and the Westies gang murdered Stein in 1977 in order to erase debts owned to Stein and to take over his loansharking operation.

== Government informants and witnesses ==
Members

- Paul "Paulie Guns" Bevacqua — former acting capo of the Gioeli crew. He was a supporter of the Orena faction who rivalled against the Persico faction during the early 1990s. It is believed that he wore a wire microphone around 2008. He died on November 11, 2011.
- Rocco Cagno — former soldier. Colombo mobster Jimmy Randazzo was his sponsor, who was murdered in May 1993. He was inducted into the Colombo crime family in 1987. He participated in the murder of Colombo captain Jimmy Angelino at his home in November 1988. In November 1993, he was indicted on murder and firearm charges and began to cooperate with the government in March 1994.
- Dino "Big Dino" Calabro — former capo. He has allegedly participated in 8 murders. Calabro is suspected of participating in the August 1997 murder of NYPD officer Ralph C. Dols, on orders of former Colombo consigliere Joel Cacace. He began cooperating after his June 2008 arrest, he was arrested alongside 2 other Colombo soldier's on charges of drug trafficking, robbery, extortion, murder and loansharking. In November 2017, he was sentenced to 11 years imprisonment.
- Joseph "Joe Campy" Campanella — former soldier. He was a close ally of William Cutolo. Campanella was shot twice by Vincent "Chicky" DeMartino with a .357 Magnum on July 16, 2001, in Coney Island after being wrongly suspected of cooperating with the authorities; DeMartino was sentenced to 25 years in prison for the attempted murder.
- Joseph "Joey Caves" Competiello — born in 1970. He had served as a soldier for the Colombo family. By October 2008, Competiello became a government witness after he was indicted in June 2008, on a range of charges such as murder, racketeering and extortion, and faced life imprisonment. In April 2012, Competiello testified against Dino "Big Dino" Calabro and Thomas "Tommy Shots" Gioeli, and admitted to participating in August 1995 murder of Richard Greaves, the July 1997 murder of Carmine Gargano Jr., the 1990s murder of Joseph Miccio, the August 1997 murder of NYPD officer Ralph Dols, and the May 1999 murder of William Cutolo, as Competiello tipped the FBI regarding the whereabouts of the corpse of Cutolo. In December 2014, Competiello was sentenced by former U.S. District Judge Brian Cogan to 12 years in prison after he had admitted to participating in 5 murders.
- Richard Ferrara — former capo of a Brooklyn crew, Ferrara was indicted on September 14, 2021, along with several members of the family. He was released on bond on January 7, 2022, after putting up $10 million secured by three shopping centers on the Jersey Shore that he co-owns with his brother. In December 2022, Ferrara pled guilty to shaking down UCTIE Local 621. Ferrara was revealed in April 2023 to have become an informant in the extortion case, and he reportedly aided the FBI in helping solve the murder of Russian national Ilder Gazizouline, who was killed by Israeli bouncer Dmitr Praus on June 21, 2009, following a confrontation at the Fusion nightclub in Sheepshead Bay, after which Ferrara's friend Dmitr Bediner helped transport Gazizouline's corpse to a wooded area in Sullivan County to be buried; Bediner confessed to his involvement in the killing to Ferrara a couple of days before he allegedly lied to federal agents about it on February 8, 2022.
- Reynold Maragni — former capo who was active in South Florida. In 2000, he was indicted on charges of credit card and bank fraud scams, loansharking and illegal gambling. A year later, he was sentenced to 2 years in prison. He was arrested in January 2011 and accused of distributing marijuana, smuggling cigarettes, extorting members of a cement and concrete union in Queens, and operating an illegal gambling ring with former Colombo captain Joseph Parna; Maragni agreed to become an informant immediately after his arrest. From April to December 2011, he wore a watch with a microphone and recorded many conversations.
- Lawrence "Larry" Mazza — former soldier, hitman and protégé of Colombo crime family capo Greg Scarpa. It is noted that he had an affair with Scarpa's wife, Linda Schiro. Mazza has admitted to murdering four people, including the January 1992 murder of Nicky Grancio, using a 12-gauge shotgun which was allegedly stolen from a New Jersey police car. He had previously witnessed the December 1991 killing of Vincent Fusaro by Scarpa, who shot Fusaro in the neck, body and back of the head with an M52 rifle while he hung up a Christmas garland on the door of his home in Brooklyn. Mazza has allegedly participated in around 25 murders. Sometime in the mid-1990s after his arrest by the FBI, he agreed to cooperate. Mazza has since relocated to Florida and became a fitness personal trainer. He released a book titled "The Life: A True Story about a Brooklyn Boy Seduced into the Dark World of the Mafia."
- Salvatore "Big Sal" Miciotta — former capo. Miciotta allegedly became a soldier for the Colombo family alongside Vincent "Jimmy" Angelino, Gerard "Jerry Brown" Clemenza, Michael Franzese, John Minerva, Vito Guzzo Sr. and Joseph Peraino Jr. on Halloween Day 1975 or 1978. He first became acquainted with Lucchese crime family underboss Anthony Casso.
- John Pate — former capo and loyalist to the Persico faction. In April 1972, he was arrested for possession of a handgun alongside Charles Panarella, Carmine Persico and Gennaro Langella. He was active in Staten Island and was promoted to captain in the late 1980s. In mid-1992, he was arrested on murder and loansharking charges. It is believed that he became an informer around 1993.
- Anthony "Big Anthony" Russo — former acting capo, not related to Andrew Russo. In 2011, Russo was charged with the 1993 murder of Orena loyalist Joseph Scopo and agreed to be a federal witness.
- Gregory "the Grim Reaper" Scarpa Sr. — notorious hitman and FBI informant from the 1970s to 1994. Scarpa Sr. died in prison from AIDS–related complications.
- Carmine Sessa — former consigliere. In the early 1990s, Sessa met with the Genovese, Lucchese and Gambino crime families and pledged his loyalty to imprisoned Colombo boss Carmine Persico, who opposed Victor Orena at the time. Sessa was arrested in 1993 and agreed to cooperate and become a government witness. He admitted to participating in 13 murders, including former Brooklyn Colombo captain, Jimmy Angelino. He was released from prison in 1997, however he was shortly after sentenced to imprisonment and was released in 2000. He testified against former FBI agent Lindley DeVecchio in October 2007.
- Michael "Mickey" Souza — born in 1968. In December 2006, he was arrested alongside 12 other mobsters from the Colombo and Gambino crime families on charges of robbery, assault, weapon possession, loansharking, gambling and drug dealing, as part of an 8-month investigation by the DEA. He and his older brother were accused of planning Hector Pagan's murder, a Bonanno crime family associate, over a financial dispute. Souza allegedly purchased a gun silencer, however he never managed to use it on Pagan due to his arrest. It is believed he became an informer around 2007.
- Frank "Frankie Blue Eyes" Sparaco — former soldier. He was a part of the Persico faction during the early 1990s. In 1993, he was sentenced to 24 years in prison for participating in 5 murders. While in prison, he scammed former U.S. House of Representatives member John LeBoutillier of $800,000. In 2009, he officially agreed to cooperate with the government.

Associates

- John Franzese Jr. — John Franzese Jr. wanted a way out of his life and was approached by the FBI with a proposition that he become an informant and he accepted. One part of the agreement he made with the FBI prior to testifying was that he would not profit from his story as a mafia figure. He was allegedly also responsible for his father John "Sonny" Franzese's fourth parole violation, but was accepted back into his confidence after denying the allegations in tears, saying, "I would never do that, no matter what kind of trouble I had." In 2005, Franzese Jr. wore a wire around his father. John Franzese Jr. testified twice against his father, the last time his father attempted to have him killed; he later lived under witness protection. In 2010, Franzese Jr. admitted that he received $50,000 from the FBI as a cooperating witness. With the help of Franzese Jr.'s testimony, his father was sentenced on January 14, 2011, to eight years in prison for extorting two Manhattan strip clubs, running a loanshark operation and extorting a pizzeria on Long Island. He is the first son of a New York mobster to turn state's evidence and testify against his father.
- Kenny "Kenji" Gallo — former associate of the Los Angeles and Colombo crime families. Gallo first met Jerry Zimmerman while he was active in the porn industry, who introduced him to underboss Sonny Franzese. He later became acquainted with Teddy Persico Jr., the nephew of Colombo boss Carmine Persico. He cooperated in 1996
- Joseph "Joe Pesh" Luparelli — former associate and bodyguard to Joseph Yacovelli. He served as one of the drivers in the April 1972 murder of Joe Gallo. Some time after the Gallo murder, he believed the Gallo-murder participants were planning to have him murdered. He flew to California to meet with FBI agents. Albert A. Seedman requested that Luparelli should be brought to New York. He was accused of harbouring Joseph Russo, following a 1970 murder in New Jersey.
- Salvatore "Crazy Sal" Polisi — former associate of the Colombo and Gambino crime families. He was active in hijacking, illegal gambling and robbery.

== Factions and territories ==
The Colombo family operates primarily in the New York City area, as well as in New Jersey, New England, Florida, Nevada, and California.

- New York – The family operate primarily in Brooklyn, Long Island and Staten Island, as well as Queens and Manhattan.
- New Jersey – The family is active in New Jersey, although it has the least significant presence of the crime families operating in the state.
- Connecticut – The family established a presence in New Haven in the 1950s. The Connecticut faction became defunct in the 1980s.
- Massachusetts – The family operates in the Boston suburb of Somerville.
- Florida – The family operates in South Florida, including Broward County.
- Nevada – The family operates in Las Vegas.
- California – The family operates in Los Angeles.

=== Crews ===
- Garfield Boys – was an Italian American street gang that operated in South Brooklyn sections of Red Hook and Gowanus. The gang was headed by future Colombo boss Carmine Persico from the 1950s to the early 1970s.

== Activities ==
The Colombo family is involved in illegal gambling, loansharking, extortion, labor racketeering, cigarette smuggling, hijacking, pornography, bankruptcy and mail fraud, tax evasion, counterfeiting, and narcotics trafficking.

=== Controlled unions ===
- N.Y.C. District Council of Carpenters The Colombo and Genovese families ran the Council from 1991 to 1996, extorting huge amounts of money from several N.Y.C. District Council of Carpenters union locals. Colombo capos Thomas Petrizzo and Vincent "Jimmy" Angellino controlled Council President Frederick Devine. The two crime families illegally used the Council to create hundreds of "no show" absentee jobs for their associates. In 1998, government witnesses Sammy Gravano and Vincent Cafaro testified against Devine. He was found guilty of embezzling union funds and sentenced to 15 months in prison.

== List of murders committed by the Colombo crime family ==
Name	Date	Reason
Antonio Colombo	1938	Antonio Colombo, the father of Joe Colombo, the future head and namesake of the Profaci-Colombo family, was found strangled to death in his car for allegedly having an affair with the wife of another member.
Cristoforo Rubino	July, 1958	Rubino was a soldier in the Profaci-Colombo family, and operated as a powerful drug dealer in the New York area. Rubino was shot 2 times and killed outside of a club located at 130 Central Avenue Bushwick, Brooklyn. It is believed Rubino was killed as he was set to testify against Vito Genovese for drug trafficking.
Francesco "Frankie Shots" Abbatemarco	November 4, 1959	59-year-old Profaci family capo Abbatemarco was shot by the Gallo brothers as he left Cardiello's Tavern in Park Slope, Brooklyn. Abbatemarco's murder was ordered by family boss Joe Profaci after he ceased paying tribute to Profaci.
Joseph "Joe Jelly" Giorelli	August 20, 1961	34-year-old Gallo crew member Giorelli disappeared after the Gallo brothers challenged Joe Profaci for control of the family. Afterwards, a dead fish wrapped in Giorelli's clothing was left on the doorstep of a bar frequented by the Gallo crew.
Joseph Magnasco	October 4, 1961	Magnasco was shot 3 times and killed, possibly by the Gallo crew outside of a restaurant located at 224 Fourth Avenue, in the South Brooklyn section, possibly to prevent Magnasco from cooperating with law enforcement before being sentenced for truck hijacking.
John Guariglia & Paul Ricci	November 11, 1961	Both men were murdered by the Gallo crew at a social club in Brooklyn, located at 72-02 Thirteenth Avenue, in the Bensonhurst section of Brooklyn.
Emile Colantuono	June 6, 1963	Colantuono had financed the Gallo crew and was found shot to death, in Manhattan.
Vincent DiTucci	June 12, 1963	DiTucci, a Profaci-Colombo family soldier, was shot to death at his home in Queens.
Alfred Mondella	June 18, 1963	Mondella had allegedly sold guns to the Gallo crew and served as a bodyguard to Joe Gallo. Mondella was shot to death in Manhattan.
Ali-Hassan "Ali Baba" Waffa	July 15, 1963	Waffa served as a driver and bodyguard to Joe Gallo. Waffa allegedly ran loansharking and illegal gambling operations in South Brooklyn. Waffa was found beaten and shot to death at the New Jersey waterfront. Law enforcement have suspected Joe "Yack" Iacovelli and Sonny Pinto as the killers.
Joseph "Joe Bats" Cardiello	August 9, 1963	Cardiello served as a captain for the Profaci-Colombo family. Cardiello was shot 4 times and killed inside of his car in Bay Ridge, Brooklyn.
Louis "Cadillac Louie" Mariani	August 9, 1963	Mariani was shot at 12 times and killed inside of his car at a shopping mall car park in Long Island. Mariani was a Joe-Gallo loyalist.
Calogero "Charles the Sidge" LoCicero	April 18, 1968	LoCicero was inducted as a soldier into the Colombo family in 1957, and later served as the former acting consigliere, or at least as a captain. LoCicero was possibly murdered by Carmine Persico and Greg Scarpa Sr., at a luncheonette in Borough Park, Brooklyn, as he was sitting at a soda counter, reportedly sipping a strawberry milkshake
Salvatore "Sally D" D'Ambrosio, and Fred "No Nose" DeLucio	November, 1969	It is believed Joe Colombo ordered their murders due to paranoia and jealousy of seizing control of the Colombo family, and were last seen at a social club located at 8648 18th Ave. in the Bath Beach section of Brooklyn.
Joseph "Joey" Colucci	February 28, 1970	26-year-old Colombo associate Colucci threatened to kill Tommy Spero, the nephew of capo Thomas "Shorty" Spero, after finding out that Spero was having an affair with his wife. Colucci was shot twice in the head by Sammy Gravano after being lured into a car following a night of drinking and then shot three more times after his body was dumped on Rockaway Parkway in Canarsie, Brooklyn. Tommy Spero acted as an accomplice.
Joseph "Joe" Colombo	June, 1971	Colombo was shot and wounded, however he slipped into a coma and succumbed in 1978.
Dominick Famulari	July 22, 1971	Famulari was a soldier of the Profaci-Colombo family and associate of John "Sonny" Franzese. Famulari was shot 9 times and killed, as he walked down a street in Williamsburg, Brooklyn.
Dom DeAngelis	November 5, 1971	DeAngelis was an associate of the Gallo faction. DeAngelis was shot 3 times and killed, at 54th Street near Seventh Avenue in Brooklyn.
Gennaro Ciprio	April 11, 1972	Ciprio served as an associate of the Colombo family. Ciprio was shot in the head by a shotgun blast outside of a restaurant located at 1744 86th Street, in the Bath Beach, Brooklyn area.
Emanuel Cammarata	September 9, 1972	Cammarata was a soldier in the Profaci-Colombo family and was identified by a Senate subcommittee as an associate of Giuseppe Magliocco. Cammarata was shot to death in Miami, Florida, located at a tavern on West Dixie Highway.
Johnny "Tarzan" Lusterino	1973	Lusterino once served as a soldier in the crew of John "Sonny" Franzese. Lusterino was shot and killed.
Gino "Books" DaSilva	December 9, 1973	DaSilva sided with the Colombo family faction. It is believed that the Chicago Outfit ordered his murder due to him and the Colombo family's success in Las Vegas.
Gaetano "Thomas" Barbusca and John Coiro	June 23, 1974	Both men served as soldiers in the Colombo family. Barbusca and Coiro were shot by a shotgun blast while they sat in a car outside of the 1717 Club in Bensonhurst, Brooklyn. Barbusca was a crew member of the Dominick Scialo faction. Barbusca was found beside the car and Coiro was found about 25 feet away from the car, as he had attempted to flee the shooters.
Stevie Cirillo	August 4, 1974	Cirillo was shot and killed, while playing craps at a charity benefit inside of a Brooklyn synagogue. Cirillo was an associate of the Gallo crew.
Dominick "Mimi" Scialo	October 9, 1974	Scialo served as a captain in the Colombo family. Scialo was found in a basement in Brooklyn, he was allegedly murdered for insulting Carlo Gambino, the boss of the Gambino family, at a restaurant in Coney Island. According to FBI informant Joey Canteloupo, Scialo was killed by Charlie "Moose" Panarella.
Tony Ricciardi	October 29, 1974	Ricciardi was shot 3 times in the head and killed, as he sat in his car at 135 Ocean Parkway, Prospect Park, Brooklyn.
Ralph Tropiano	March 2, 1980	Tropiano allegedly operated in Connecticut on behalf of the Colombo family. Tropiano was possibly murdered due to a power struggle.
Angelo "Jilly" Greca	April 22, 1980	Greca was inducted into the Colombo family as a soldier in May 1977. Greca is known for his involvement with Donnie Brasco, better known as former undercover FBI agent Joseph Pistone. During Pistone's early undercover work, he first met Greca and his crew, who were mostly involved in truck hijacking, before moving to Anthony Mirra and Lefty Ruggerio in the Bonanno family. According to Pistone in his book, the Colombo family falsely believed Greca was cooperating with the FBI, the result of his murder, however he was not.
Dominic Somma	August 20, 1980	It has been alleged Greg Scarpa Sr. murdered Somma at a social club in Brooklyn, as a result of criticising Greg Scarpa Jr. after a failed bank robbery in Queens, although Carmine Sessa testified that Somma was murdered for drug dealing.
Alfred Longobardi	July, 1981	Greg Scarpa Jr. convinced his father, Greg Scarpa Sr., and Joseph DeDomenico, to murder Longobardi after Longobardi insulted Scarpa Jr. at a nightclub in Staten Island.
John "Johnny Irish" Matera	July, 1981	Matera was known as an enforcer for John "Sonny" Franzese during his tenure as underboss of the Colombo family. Matera grew up in Little Italy, Manhattan but moved to Brooklyn and later Queens after serving in the Korean War. Matera was implicated in the October 1976 murder of Colombo family soldier John "Mooney" Cutrone, along with Colombo family soldier Salvatore Albanese and Colombo family associate Hugh "Apples" McIntosh. Matera was inducted into the Colombo family as a soldier and sponsored by Colombo family boss Thomas DiBella, in February 1977. In 1978 or 1979, Matera replaced James Clemenza as captain of the Florida crew. According to several informants, Colombo family boss Carmine Persico ordered his murder, and his crew was allegedly taken over by Anthony "Tony Black" Induisi.
Robert "Bucky" DiLeonardo	July 16, 1981	DiLeonardo served as an associate of the Colombo family. DilLeonardo's younger brother was former Gambino family captain Michael "Mikey Scars" DiLeonardo. DiLeonardo was found shot to death at a field in Staten Island, possibly due to the fact that he had a drug addiction. Law enforcement believe DiLeonardo was murdered by Greg Scarpa Jr.
Joseph Peraino Jr. and Veronica Zuraw	January 5, 1982	Colombo family boss Carmine Persico allegedly ordered the murders of Joseph Peraino Sr. and Joseph Peraino Jr. for embezzling profits from the pornographic film Deep Throat. The father and son were targeted in a drive-by shooting in Gravesend, Brooklyn, which left 31-year-old Peraino Jr. dead and 60-year-old Peraino Sr. paralyzed. Veronica Zuraw, a 53-year-old former nun, was also killed by a gunshot blast to the head when shotgun pellets penetrated the door of her home at 431 Lake Street, where the mobsters sought refuge as they tried to flee their assailants. Joseph Carna, Thomas Gioeli and Salvatore Miciotta were the alleged shooters. Peraino Sr., a Colombo soldier, had survived a previous shooting two months earlier.
Caesar Vitale and Patty Vitale	February 15, 1982	Vitale and his wife were shot over 10 times with their throats slashed, at their home in South Florida.
Sal Cardaci	January 1983	Greg Scarpa Sr. believed the possibility that Cardaci was going to cooperate with law enforcement and implicate Billy Meli, a friend of Greg Scarpa Jr., in turn Scarpa Sr. orchestrated the murder of Cardaci, as he was lured to a candy store basement and was shot in the head with a magnum pistol by Carmine Sessa.
Mary Bari	September 24–25, 1984	Bari was lured by Greg Scarpa Jr. to a bar in Brooklyn and was shot 3 times in the head by Greg Scarpa Sr. after Bari was cooperating with the FBI regarding information of Alphonse Persico.
Joseph "Stymie" D'Angelo	August 23, 1985	37-year-old Gambino family associate D'Angelo was shot in the head by Colombo associate Anthony Frezza following an altercation at Tali's restaurant and lounge at 6205 18th Avenue in Bensonhurst, Brooklyn.
Anthony "Tony Muscles" Frezza	October 1985	Greg Scarpa Jr. shot Frezza in the head at his home as retaliation for murdering an associate of the Gambino family.
Albert Nacha	December, 1985	It is believed Greg Scarpa Sr. warned Nacha to avoid selling marijuana within his territory, Nacha refused and was shot to death.
Michael Yodice and Josè Lopez	December, 1986	Both men were murdered by the Greg Scarpa Sr. crew.
Salvatore Scarpa	January 15, 1987	Scarpa was shot and killed inside of a social club in Brooklyn.
Joseph "Joe Brewster" DeDomenico	September 17, 1987	DeDomenico served as a soldier for the Colombo family. The Colombo family were paranoid regarding DeDomenico possibly testifying against the Colombo family.
Anthony Bolino	May, 1988	Bolino was shot in the head by Carmine Sessa, as Bolino was suspected of shaking down Sessa's drug dealers.
Vincent "Jimmy" Angelino	1988	Angelino served as the acting consigliere during the late 1980s for the Colombo family, and before his tenure as consigliere, he served as a powerful captain based in Brooklyn for the Colombo family. According to Greg Scarpa Sr., Angelino was murdered as a result of refusing to step down as consigliere, in order for Benedetto Aloi to take over as consigliere for the Colombo family.
Thomas Ocera	November 13, 1989	Ocera served as a captain for the Colombo family. It is believed Vic Orena ordered his murder as a result of skimming profits and refusal to pay tribute money to the Colombo family from his drug trafficking operation.
Patrick Porco	May 27, 1990	It is believed Porco was murdered on the orders of Greg Scarpa Sr. after Scarpa believed the possibility of Porco cooperating with authorities after Porco was charged with one murder count.
Frank Marasa	June 12, 1991	Marasa was shot multiple times and killed allegedly for his involvement in a murder of a Colombo family associate.
Gioachino "Jack" Leale	November 1, 1991	Leale was a soldier for the Colombo family. It is believed Leale was murdered for his involvement in a botched murder.
Henry "Hank the Bank" Smurra	November 24, 1991	Smurra served as a soldier for the Colombo family and served as a loyalist to the Persico faction. Smurra was shot to death inside his car parked at the front of a Dunkin Donuts shop in Brooklyn.
Gaetano "Tommy Scars" Amato	December 2, 1991	Amato was a soldier for the Genovese crime family. It is believed Amato was accidentally shot and killed, with the real target being Joey Tolino, a Colombo family associate, a third man also identified as a Colombo family associate, Anthony Bianco, also survived with Tolino.
Rosario "Black Sam" Nastasi	December 5, 1991	Nastasi was a Persico loyalist and Colombo family soldier. Nastasi was gunned down inside of a social club in Brooklyn.
Vincent "Vinnie Venus" Fusaro	December 7, 1991	Fusaro served as a Colombo family soldier and Persico loyalist. Fusaro was shot and killed outside his home in Bath Beach, Brooklyn, whilst he hung his Christmas decorations.
Matteo Speranza	December 8, 1991	Speranza was a civilian, an 18-year-old cashier at a bagel store in Bay Ridge, Brooklyn. Speranza was allegedly killed by accident, possibly a case of mistaken identity, he was shot in the head.
Nicholas "Nicky Black" Grancio	January 7, 1992	Grancio was inducted into the Colombo family as a soldier in April 1977. Grancio was an Orena loyalist. Grancio was killed by a shotgun blast as he sat in his car in a Brooklyn street. Grancio's killer was Greg Scarpa Sr.
Michael Devine	January 24, 1992	Devine owned a Staten Island nightclub. Devine had flirted with the wife of Alphonse Persico and he was subsequently murdered by Frank "Frankie Blue Eyes" Sparaco.
Johnny Minerva & Mike Imbergamo	March 25, 1992	Both men were Orena loyalists and were both murdered as they sat in a car outside of a restaurant in North Massapequa, New York.
Larry Lampasi	May 22, 1992	Lampasi was an Vic Orena faction loyalist. Lampasi was gunned down with a shotgun blast in his driveway at his home in Brooklyn.
Steven "Stevie Lightning" Mancusi	October 7, 1992	Mancusi was an Persico loyalist, and possible captain or soldier. Mancusi was shot and killed as he was entering his car.
Anthony Mesi	November 3, 1992	Mesi was shot and killed, his murder was orchestrated by Vito Guzzo Jr. as revenge for the murder of his father in 1987.
Greg Scarpa Sr.	December 28, 1992	It is believed Scarpa Sr. confronted Michael DeRosa and Ronald Moran, affiliates with the Lucchese family, over drug issues involving his son, Scarpa Sr. was shot in the face and through his left eye, by a .25 calibre pistol and a 9 millimetre pistol, located in Dyker Heights, Brooklyn. It is believed Scarpa Sr. drove home and numbed himself with a bottle of whiskey, before he was taken 20 miles away from the Mount Sinai Medical Center.
Jimmy "Ran" Randazzo	May 17, 1993	Randazzo was an Orena loyalist and suspected of being an informant, Rocco Cagno, Ray Cagno and Salvatore "Torty" Lombardino were suspected as the killers.
Joey Scopo	October 20, 1993	Scopo served as the underboss for the Vic Orena faction. Scopo was shot and killed at the front of his home in Queens.
Rolando Rivera	June 7, 1994	Rivera was shot 4 times in a stolen van in Staten Island, by John Pappa and Eric Curcio, allegedly due to his friendship towards John Sparacino, a Colombo family affiliate, whom was out of favor with Pappa and would later be murdered himself in August 1994.
Carmine Gargano Jr.	July 10, 1994	Gargano was a student at Pace University, aged 21-year old at the time of his disappearance. It has been alleged John Pappa, or Dino Calabro and Joseph Competiello were responsible for his murder. Gargano was allegedly killed in a revenge plot aimed at his cousin, whom was a soldier in the Lucchese family involved in a dispute with a Colombo family associate.
John Sparacino	August 15, 1994	Sparacino was killed as a result of botching a murder.
Eric Curcio	October 4, 1994	Curcio was shot and killed by John Pappa, due to not giving Pappa recognition for a previous murder.
Richard Greaves	August 3, 1995	Greaves was an associate of the Colombo family. It is believed Thomas Gioeli orchestrated and ordered the murder after Greaves was suspected of cooperating with law enforcement, he was shot and killed in a Brooklyn apartment.
Ralph C. Dols	August 25, 1997	Dols was a New York police officer. Joel Cacace allegedly ordered the murder after Dols had married Cacace's ex-wife.
William "Wild Bill" Cutolo	May 26, 1999	Cutolo briefly served as underboss for the Colombo family. It is believed Cutolo was murdered as a result of possibly seizing control of the Colombo family, and in turn Cutolo's murder was orchestrated by John "Jackie" DeRoss and Alphonse "Allie Boy" Persico.
Chris Mignone	May 18, 2011	Mignone, the cousin of Carmine Persico, was shot and killed inside of an auto body repair shop located at 68 Bennington Ave, in Freeport, New York.
Louis Barbati	June 30, 2016	Barbati was an associate of the Colombo family. Barbati was shot and killed by Andres "Andy" Fernandez located outside of his home at 12th Avenue in Dyker Heights, Brooklyn, later in December 2019, Fernandez was sentenced to 24 years in prison.

== See also ==
- Crime in New York City
- Italians in New York City
- List of Italian Mafia crime families

== Sources ==
=== Books ===
- Capeci, Jerry (2001) The Complete Idiot's Guide to the Mafia Alpha. ISBN 0028642252
- Folsom, Tom (2008). The Mad Ones: Crazy Joe Gallo and the Revolution at the Edge of the Underworld. New York City: Hachette Book Group. ISBN 9781602860810.
- Raab, Selwyn (2006) The Five Families: The Rise, Decline & Resurgence of America's Most Powerful Mafia Empire. New York: St. Martins Press. ISBN 0312361815

=== Reports ===
- Zazzali, James R. (September 1990). 21st Annual Report (PDF) (Report). State of New Jersey Commission of Investigation – via Government of New Jersey.
- Schiller, Francis E. (May 2004). The Changing Face of Organize Crime in New Jersey (PDF) (Report). State of New Jersey Commission of Investigation – via Government of New Jersey.
