= Five Families =

Five major New York City organized crime families of the Italian American Mafia

The Five Families are the five Italian American Mafia crime families who operate in New York City. In 1931, the Five Families were organized by Salvatore Maranzano following his victory in the Castellammarese War. Maranzano reorganized the Italian American gangs in New York City into the Maranzano, Profaci, Mangano, Luciano, and Gagliano families, which are now known as the Bonanno, Colombo, Gambino, Genovese, and Lucchese families, respectively. Each family had a demarcated territory and a hierarchy and reported to the same overarching governing entity.

Initially, Maranzano intended each family's boss to report to him as the capo dei capi ("boss of the bosses"). This led to his assassination that September, and that role was abolished for the Commission, a ruling committee established by Lucky Luciano to oversee all Mafia activities in the United States and to mediate conflicts between families. It consisted of the bosses of the Five Families as well as the bosses of the Chicago Outfit and the Buffalo crime family. In 1963, Joseph Valachi publicly disclosed the existence of New York City's Five Families at the Valachi hearings. Since then, a few other crime families have been able to become powerful or notable enough to rise to a level comparable to that of the Five Families, holding or sharing the unofficial designation of Sixth Family.

== History ==
=== Leading up to the Five Families ===
In the 1920s, Mafia operations in the U.S. were under the control of Giuseppe "Joe The Boss" Masseria, whose faction consisted mainly of gangsters from Sicily and sporadically from other regions of Southern Italy like Calabria, Campania and Apulia. Masseria's faction included Charles "Lucky" Luciano, Albert "Mad Hatter" Anastasia, Vito Genovese, Alfred Mineo, Willie Moretti, Joe Adonis, and Frank Costello. However, powerful Sicilian mafioso Don Vito Cascio Ferro decided to make a bid for control of Mafia operations.

From his base in Castellammare del Golfo, he sent Salvatore Maranzano to seize control. The Castellammarese faction in the U.S. included Joseph "Joe Bananas" Bonanno, Stefano "The Undertaker" Magaddino, Joseph Profaci, and Joe Aiello. As it became more and more evident that the two factions would clash for leadership of the Mafia, they each sought to recruit more followers to support them.

The Castellammarese War was between the forces of Masseria and Maranzano. Underneath, however, there was also a generational conflict between the old guard Sicilian leadership – known as the "Mustache Petes" for their long mustaches and old-world ways, such as refusing to do business with non-Italians – and the "Young Turks", a younger and more diverse Italian group who were more forward-thinking and willing to work more with non-Italians. This approach led his followers to question whether Masseria was even capable of making the Mafia prosper in modern times. Led by Luciano, the aim of this group was to end the war as soon as possible in order to resume their businesses, because they viewed the conflict as unnecessary. Luciano's objective was to modernize the mob and do away with unnecessary orthodox norms. This was a vision that enabled him to attract followers, who had seen the inadequacies of Masseria's traditionalist leadership. Therefore, both factions were fluid, with many mobsters switching sides or killing their own allies during the war. Tensions between the Maranzano and Masseria factions were evident as far back as 1928, with one side frequently hijacking the other's alcohol trucks (alcohol production was then illegal in the United States due to Prohibition).

In early 1931, Luciano made the decision to take out Masseria. The war had been going poorly for Masseria, and Luciano saw an opportunity to switch allegiance. In a secret deal with Maranzano, Luciano agreed to engineer Masseria's death in return for receiving Masseria's rackets and becoming Maranzano's second-in-command. Joe Adonis had joined the Masseria faction and when Masseria heard about Luciano's betrayal, he approached Adonis about killing Luciano. However, Adonis instead warned Luciano about the murder plot. On April 15, 1931, Masseria was killed at Nuova Villa Tammaro, a Coney Island restaurant in Brooklyn. While they played cards, Luciano allegedly excused himself to the bathroom, with the gunmen reportedly being Anastasia, Genovese, Adonis, and Benjamin "Bugsy" Siegel; Ciro "The Artichoke King" Terranova drove the getaway car, but legend has it that he was too shaken up to drive away and Siegel had to shove him out of the driver's seat. With Maranzano's blessing, Luciano took over Masseria's gang and became Maranzano's lieutenant, ending the Castellammarese War.

=== The Five Families' formation ===
With Masseria gone, Maranzano reorganized the Italian American gangs in New York City into the Five Families headed by Luciano, Profaci, Gagliano, Mangano, and himself. In c. April 1931, Maranzano called a meeting of crime bosses in Wappingers Falls, New York, where he declared himself capo di tutti i capi ("boss of all bosses"). Maranzano also whittled down the rival families' rackets in favor of his own. Luciano appeared to accept these changes, but was merely biding his time before removing Maranzano. Although Maranzano was slightly more forward-thinking than Masseria, Luciano had come to believe that Maranzano was even greedier and more hidebound than Masseria had been.

By September 1931, Maranzano realized Luciano was a threat, and hired Vincent "Mad Dog" Coll, an Irish gangster, to kill him. However, Lucchese alerted Luciano that he was marked for death. On September 10, 1931, Maranzano ordered Luciano, Genovese, and Costello to come to his office at the 230 Park Avenue in Manhattan. Convinced that Maranzano planned to murder them, Luciano decided to act first. He sent four Jewish gangsters to Maranzano's office whose faces were unknown to Maranzano's people. They had been secured with the aid of Jewish mobsters Meyer Lansky and Bugsy Siegel. Disguised as government agents, two of the gangsters disarmed Maranzano's bodyguards. The other two, aided by Lucchese, who was there to point Maranzano out, stabbed the boss multiple times before shooting him. This assassination was the first of what would later be fabled as the "Night of the Sicilian Vespers".

=== The Commission's formation ===
After Maranzano's murder in September 1931, Luciano called a meeting in Chicago. Although there would have been few objections had Luciano declared himself capo di tutti i capi, he abolished the title, believing the position created trouble among the families and would make himself a target for another ambitious challenger. Luciano's goals with the Commission were to quietly maintain his own power over all the families, and to prevent future gang wars; the bosses approved the idea of the Commission. The Commission would consist of a "board of directors" to oversee all Mafia activities in the United States and serve to mediate conflicts between families.

The Commission consisted of seven family bosses: the leaders of New York's Five Families: Charlie "Lucky" Luciano, Vincent Mangano, Tommy Gagliano, Joseph Bonanno, and Joe Profaci; Chicago Outfit boss Al Capone; and Buffalo family boss Stefano Magaddino. Charlie Luciano was appointed chairman of the Commission. The Commission agreed to hold meetings every five years or when they needed to discuss family problems.

=== Decline of the Mafia ===
The five Mafia families in New York City are still active, but less powerful. The decline of the mafia started to be felt in the 1970s throughout the 1980s, when the Racketeer Influenced and Corrupt Organizations Act (RICO Act) was enacted, which aimed to stop the Mafia and organized crime as a whole. The act was effective, and led to a large portion of the members who were arrested turning into informants. This effect compounded over time.

== Original and current Five Families bosses ==
In 1963, Joseph Valachi publicly disclosed the existence of New York City's Five Families at the Valachi hearings. According to Valachi, the original bosses of the Five Families were Charles Luciano, Tommaso Gagliano, Joseph Profaci, Salvatore Maranzano, and Vincent Mangano. At the time of his testimony in 1963, Valachi revealed that the current bosses of the Five Families were Tommy Lucchese, Vito Genovese, Joseph Colombo, Carlo Gambino, and Joe Bonanno. These have since been the names most commonly used to refer to the New York Five Families, despite years of overturn and changing bosses in each.

Original family name	Founded by	Current family name	Named after	Current boss	Acting boss
Maranzano	Salvatore Maranzano	Bonanno	Joe Bonanno	Michael "The Nose" Mancuso	
Profaci	Joe Profaci	Colombo	Joseph Colombo	Theodore N. "Skinny Teddy" Persico Jr.	Robert "Little Robert" Donofrio
Mangano	Vincent Mangano	Gambino	Carlo Gambino	Domenico Cefalù	Lorenzo Mannino
Luciano	Lucky Luciano	Genovese	Vito Genovese	Liborio Salvatore "Barney" Bellomo	
Gagliano	Tommy Gagliano	Lucchese	Tommy Lucchese	Victor Amuso	Michael "Big Mike" DeSantis

== Territories ==
The crime families historically operated throughout the New York metropolitan area, but mainly within New York City. In the state of New York, the gangs have increased their criminal rackets on Long Island, including both Nassau and Suffolk counties, and the counties of Westchester, Rockland, and Albany. They also maintain a strong presence in the state of New Jersey. The Five Families are also active in South Florida, Connecticut, Las Vegas, and Massachusetts.

- The Bonanno crime family operates mainly in Brooklyn, Queens, Staten Island, and Long Island. The family also maintains influence in Manhattan, The Bronx, Westchester County, New Jersey, California, Florida, and Atlanta, and have ties to the Rizzuto crime family in Quebec.
  - The Bath Avenue Crew operated in the Bensonhurst section of Brooklyn, New York City
- The Colombo crime family operates mainly in Brooklyn, Queens, and Long Island. The family also maintains influence in Staten Island, Manhattan, The Bronx, New Jersey, Georgia, and Florida.
- The Gambino crime family operates mainly in Brooklyn, Queens, Manhattan, Staten Island, and Long Island. The family also maintains influence in The Bronx, New Jersey, Westchester County, Connecticut, Florida, and Los Angeles.
  - The Ozone Park Boys operate in Queens and Long Island.
  - The Staten Island Boys operate mainly in Staten Island under few other sub-groups.
    - The Annadale-Rossville Boys
    - Great Kills Crew
    - North Staten Island Crew
- The Genovese crime family operates mainly in Manhattan, the Bronx, Brooklyn, and New Jersey. The family also maintains influence in Queens, Staten Island, Long Island, Westchester County, Rockland County, Connecticut, Massachusetts, and Florida.
  - 116th Street Crew operates in Upper Manhattan and The Bronx.
  - Greenwich Village Crew operates in Greenwich Village in Lower Manhattan.
  - Genovese crime family New Jersey faction operates throughout New Jersey.
- The Lucchese crime family operates mainly in The Bronx, Manhattan, Brooklyn, and New Jersey. The family also maintains influence in Queens, Long Island, Staten Island, Westchester County, and Florida.
  - Cutaia Crew operates in Brooklyn, Queens, and Long Island.
  - Lucchese crime family New Jersey faction operates throughout New Jersey.
  - The Tanglewood Boys was a "recruitment gang" that operated in Westchester County, The Bronx, and Manhattan.

== Mafia boss succession ==
=== Bonanno family ===
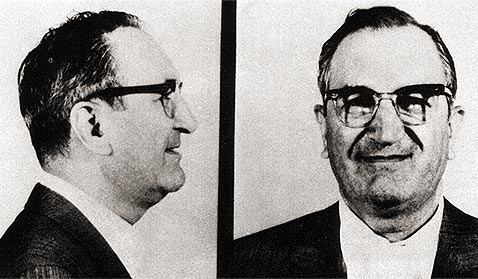
Mugshot of Joseph "Joe Bananas" Bonanno, boss of the Bonanno crime family from 1931 to 1968

- 1909–1912 – Sebastiano DiGaetano - stepped down before disappearing
- 1912–1930 – Nicolo Schirò – fled
- 1930–1931 – Salvatore Maranzano – murdered on September 10, 1931
- 1931–1968 – Joseph "Joe Bananas" Bonanno – on October 21, 1964, Bonanno disappeared; forcibly replaced as boss by the commission; crime family split into two factions; in May 1966, Bonanno reappeared after two years; officially retires after a heart attack in 1968
  - Disputed 1964–1966 – Gaspar "Gasparino" DiGregorio – installed when Bonanno disappeared and later forcibly replaced by the Commission
  - Acting 1966–1968 – Paul Sciacca – for the DiGregorio faction
- 1968–1971 – Paul Sciacca – imprisoned
- 1971–1973 – Natale "Joe Diamonds" Evola – died on August 28, 1973
- 1973–1991 – Phillip "Rusty" Rastelli – imprisoned 1975–1984 and 1986–1991
  - Acting (unofficial) 1974–1979 – Carmine "Cigar" Galante – murdered on July 12, 1979
  - Acting 1979–1983 – Salvatore "Sally Fruits" Farrugia – appointed by the Commission
  - Acting 1987–1991 – Anthony "Old Man" Spero – sentenced to life imprisonment in 2002, died in 2008
- 1991–2004 – Joseph "Big Joey" Massino – imprisoned January 2003, became government informant in October 2004
  - Acting 1991–1993 – Anthony "Old Man" Spero
  - Acting 2003–2004 – Anthony "Tony Green" Urso – imprisoned January 2004
- 2004–2011 – Vincent "Vinny Gorgeous" Basciano – imprisoned November 2004, in July 2007 received a life sentence
  - Acting 2004–2006 – Michael "the Nose" Mancuso – imprisoned February 2006
  - Acting 2006–2009 – Salvatore "Sal the Iron Worker" Montagna – deported to Canada in April 2009, shot and killed in November 2011
  - Acting 2010–2012 – Vincent "Vinny T.V." Badalamenti – imprisoned in January 2012
- 2013–present – Michael "the Nose" Mancuso – released from prison March 12, 2019
  - Acting 2013–2014 – Thomas "Tommy D" DiFiore – arrested on January 23, 2014
  - Acting 2014–2015 – John "Johnny Skyway" Palazzolo – arrested on March 27, 2015, for violating parole
  - Acting 2015–2019 – Joseph "Joe C" Cammarano Jr. – indicted on racketeering and extortion charges on January 12, 2018, acquitted March 13, 2019

=== Colombo family ===
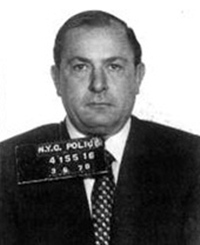
The March 6, 1970 mug shot of Joseph Colombo, boss of the Colombo crime family

- 1928–1962 – Joseph Profaci – died of natural causes
- 1962–1963 – Joseph Magliocco – forced to retire by Mafia Commission
- 1963–1973 – Joseph Colombo – paralyzed by assassination attempt
  - Acting 1971–1972 – Joseph Yacovelli – fled, after the murder of Joe Gallo
  - Acting 1972–1973 – Vincenzo "Vincent" Aloi – imprisoned
  - Acting 1973 – Joseph "Joey" Brancato – imprisoned
- 1973–2019 – Carmine "Junior" Persico – imprisoned 1973–1979, 1981–1984, 1985–2019, died on March 7, 2019
  - Acting 1973–1979 – Thomas DiBella – stepped down, became consigliere
  - Acting 1981–1983 – Alphonse "Allie Boy" Persico – Carmine Persico's brother; fugitive 1980–1987, imprisoned
  - Acting 1983–1984 – Gennaro "Jerry Lang" Langella – imprisoned
  - Acting 1985–1987 – Anthony "Scappy" Scarpati – imprisoned
  - Acting 1987–1991 – Vittorio "Vic" Orena – imprisoned sentenced to life
  - Acting 1991–1993 – Vacant – disputed leadership during the third war
  - Acting 1994–1996 – Andrew "Andy Mush" Russo – imprisoned March 1997
  - Acting 1996–2019 – Alphonse "Little Allie Boy" Persico – Carmine Persico's son; imprisoned sentenced to life 2009
- 2019–2022 — Andrew "Andy Mush" Russo – indicted on September 14, 2021. Died on April 18, 2022.
  - Acting 2022–present — Robert "Little Robert" Donofrio
- 2025–present — Theodore N. "Skinny Teddy" Persico Jr.

=== Gambino family ===
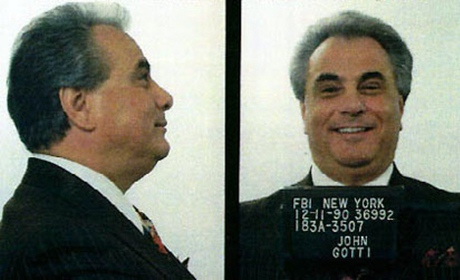
The 1990 mug shot of John Gotti, boss of the Gambino crime family from 1985 to 2002

- 1900s–1910 – Ignazio "the Wolf" Lupo – imprisoned in 1910.
- 1910–1928 – Salvatore "Toto" D'Aquila – took over the Brooklyn Camorra in 1916 and merged with Al Mineo's gang forming the largest family in New York. He was killed on orders of boss Joe Masseria in 1928.
- 1928–1930 – Manfredi "Alfred" Mineo – killed in Castellammarese War in 1930.
- 1930–1931 – Frank Scalice – demoted after murder of boss of all bosses Salvatore Maranzano.
- 1931–1951 – Vincent Mangano – disappeared in April 1951, allegedly killed on orders of underboss Albert Anastasia.
- 1951–1957 – Albert Anastasia – murdered in October 1957 on orders of Carlo Gambino.
- 1957–1976 – Carlo Gambino – died of natural causes in 1976.
  - Acting 1964–1976 – Paul Castellano – acting boss for Gambino, became official boss after his death.
- 1976–1985 – Paul Castellano – murdered in December 1985 on orders of capo John Gotti.
- 1985–2002 – John Gotti – imprisoned in 1990, died in 2002.
  - Acting 1993–1999 – John A. Gotti – imprisoned in 1999, later retired.
  - Acting 1999–2002 – Peter Gotti – promoted to official boss.
- 2002–2011 – Peter Gotti – imprisoned in 2002, died in 2021.
  - Acting 2002–2005 – Arnold Squitieri
  - Acting 2005–2008 – John D'Amico
- 2011–present – Domenico "Italian Dom" Cefalù
  - Acting 2015–2019 – Frank Cali – murdered in March 2019.
  - Front boss 2019–present – Lorenzo Mannino

=== Genovese family ===
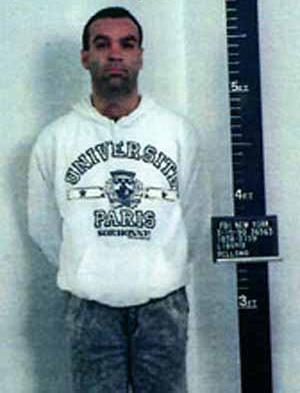
A 1996 mug shot of Liborio Bellomo, believed to be the current boss of the Genovese crime family

- 1890s–1909 – Giuseppe "the Clutch Hand" Morello – imprisoned
- 1910–1916 – Nicholas "Nick Morello" Terranova – murdered on September 7, 1916
- 1916–1920 – Vincenzo "Vincent" Terranova – stepped down becoming underboss
- 1920–1922 – Giuseppe "the Clutch Hand" Morello – stepped down becoming underboss to Masseria
- 1922–1931 – Giuseppe "Joe the Boss" Masseria – murdered on April 15, 1931
- 1931–1946 – Charles "Lucky" Luciano – imprisoned in 1936, deported to Italy in 1946
  - Acting 1936–1937 – Vito Genovese – fled to Italy in 1937 to avoid murder charge
  - Acting 1937–1946 – Frank "the Prime Minister" Costello – became official boss after Luciano's deportation
- 1946–1957 – Frank "the Prime Minister" Costello – resigned in 1957 after Genovese-Gigante assassination attempt
- 1957–1969 – Vito "Don Vito" Genovese – imprisoned in 1959, died in prison in 1969
  - Acting 1959–1962 – Anthony "Tony Bender" Strollo – disappeared in 1962
  - Acting 1962–1965 – Thomas "Tommy Ryan" Eboli – became front boss
  - Acting 1965–1969 – Philip "Benny Squint" Lombardo – became the official boss
- 1969–1981 – Philip "Benny Squint" Lombardo – retired in 1981, died of natural causes in 1987
- 1981–2005 – Vincent "Chin" Gigante – imprisoned in 1997, died in prison on December 19, 2005
  - Acting 1989–1996 – Liborio "Barney" Bellomo – promoted to street boss
  - Acting 1997–1998 – Dominick "Quiet Dom" Cirillo – suffered heart attack and resigned
  - Acting 1998–2005 – Matthew "Matty the Horse" Ianniello – resigned when indicted in July 2005
  - Acting 2005–2008 – Daniel "Danny the Lion" Leo – imprisoned 2008–2013
- 2010–present – Liborio "Barney" Bellomo

=== Lucchese family ===
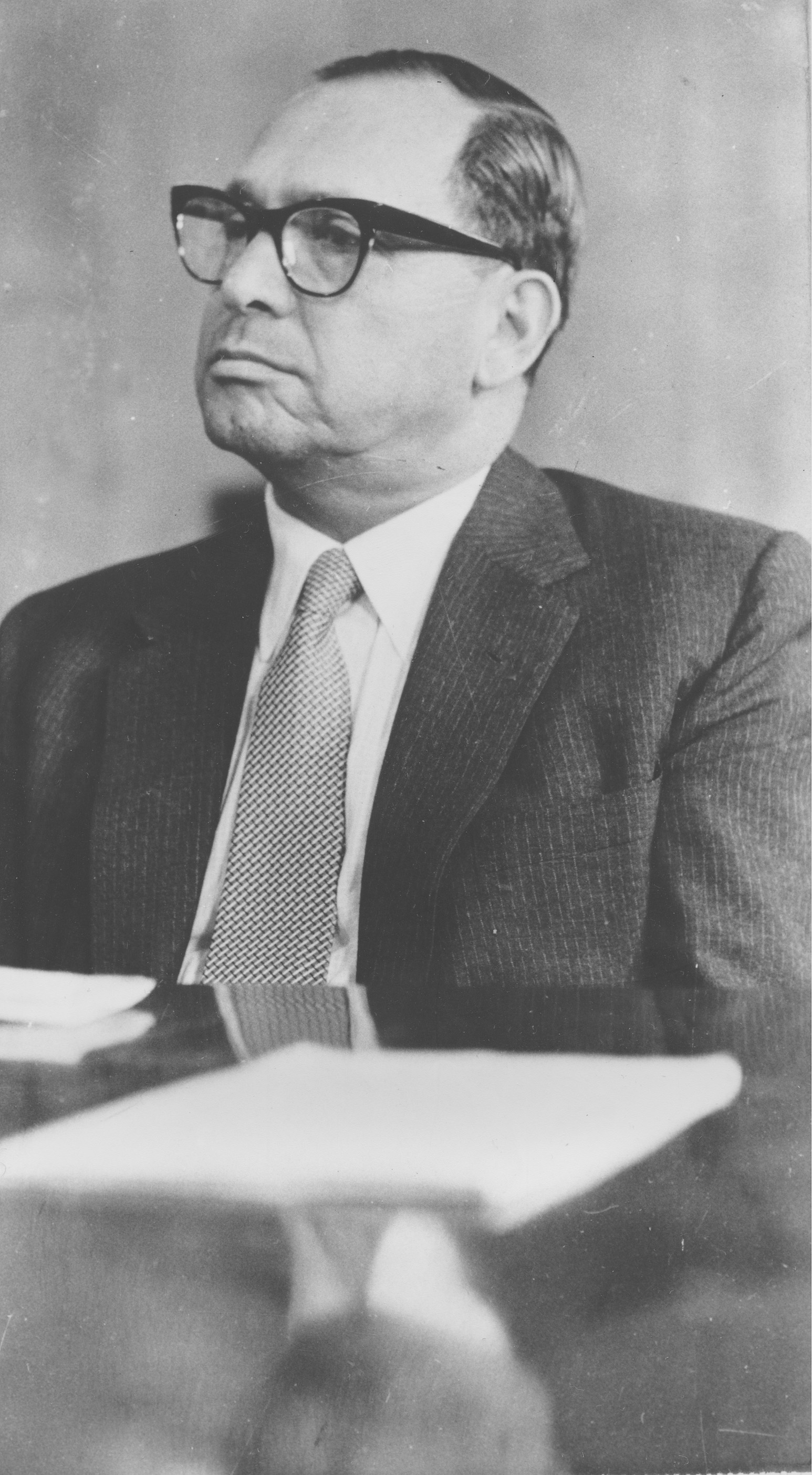
Tommy Lucchese, boss of the Lucchese crime family from 1951 to 1967

- 1922–1930: Gaetano "Tommy" Reina: murdered on February 26, 1930
- 1930: Bonaventura "Joseph" Pinzolo: murdered on September 5, 1930
- 1930–1951: Tommaso "Tommy" Gagliano: retired in 1951, died on February 16, 1953
- 1951–1967: Gaetano "Tommy Brown" Lucchese: died on July 13, 1967
  - Acting 1966–1967: Carmine Tramunti: stepped down
  - Acting 1967: Ettore "Eddie" Coco: stepped down
- 1967–1973: Carmine "Mr. Gribbs" Tramunti: imprisoned in October 1973
- 1973–1986: Anthony "Tony Ducks" Corallo: indicted on February 15, 1985, convicted on November 19, 1986, in the Mafia Commission Trial and sentenced on January 13, 1987, to 100 years in prison.
- 1986–present: Vittorio "Vic" Amuso: arrested in 1991, received a life sentence in January 1993
  - Acting 1990–1991: Alphonse "Little Al" D'Arco: demoted, became a member of a ruling panel
  - Acting 1995–1998: Joseph "Little Joe" DeFede: imprisoned in 1998
  - Acting 1998–2000: Steven "Wonderboy" Crea: imprisoned on September 6, 2000
  - Acting 2000–2003: Louis "Louie Bagels" Daidone: imprisoned March 2003, received life sentence in January 2004
  - Acting 2009–2017: Matthew "Matt" Madonna: indicted 2007 and 2009; imprisoned 2015–present; indicted 2017
  - Acting 2017–present: Michael "Big Mike" DeSantis

== See also ==
- Crime in New York City
- Italians in New York City
- List of Italian Mafia crime families
