= Evola (surname) =

Italian surname

Evola is a surname of Italian origin. It is perhaps a topographic name, or possibly a habitational name.

Notable people with the surname include:

- Julius Evola (1898–1974), Italian radical-right philosopher and esotericist
- Lin Evola (born 1950), American painter
- Natale Evola (1907–1973), American mobster
