= Salvatore Bonanno =

American mobster (1932–2008)

- Born: Salvatore Vincent Bonanno; November 5, 1932; New York City, U.S.
- Died: January 1, 2008 (aged 75); Tucson, Arizona, U.S.
- Resting place: Holy Hope Cemetery and Mausoleum, Tucson
- Other name: Bill
- Occupations: Mobster, writer
- Spouse: Rosalie Profaci (m. 1956)
- Children: 4
- Parent(s): Joseph Bonanno; Fay Labruzzo
- Relatives: Joe Profaci (uncle-in-law)
- Allegiance: Bonanno crime family

Salvatore Vincent "Bill" Bonanno (November 5, 1932 – January 1, 2008) was an American mobster who served as consigliere of the Bonanno crime family of New York City, and son of crime boss Joseph Bonanno. Later in life, he became a writer and produced films for television about his family.

== Early life ==
Bonanno was the first child of Joseph and Fay (née Labruzzo) Bonanno, born on November 5, 1932, in the Brooklyn borough of New York City. His father had come from Castellammare del Golfo, Sicily, with his grandparents, Catherine and Salvatore, and became boss of the Bonanno crime family a year before he was born. In 1938, after his father purchased property in Hempstead, Long Island, he attended school there. At the age of 10, Bonanno developed a severe mastoid ear infection. In order to aid in treating this ailment, his parents enrolled him in a Catholic boarding school in the dry climate of Tucson, Arizona. Bonanno attended Tucson High. Between 1950 and 1952, Bonanno attended the University of Arizona, but never graduated.

On August 18, 1956, Bonanno married Rosalie Marie Profaci, daughter of Salvatore Lawrence Profaci Sr., brother of Profaci crime family boss Joseph Profaci. Designed to cement an alliance between the two crime families, the sumptuous wedding had 3,000 guests. DeCavalcante crime family boss Sam DeCavalcante later remarked on Bonanno's poor treatment of Rosalie: "It's a shame; the girl wanted to commit suicide because of the way he treated her". Bonanno and Rosalie eventually had four children; Charles, Joseph, Salvatore, and Felippa ("Rebecca"); Charles was adopted by Bonanno and his wife in 1958.

== Involvement with organized crime begins ==
Shortly after leaving university, Bonanno was inducted as a "made man" into the Bonanno family, and was eventually appointed as consigliere by his father. However, many family members felt that Bonanno lacked experience and was too intellectual to lead effectively. These tensions only worsened when Bonanno advised his father against involving the family in the illegal narcotics trade.

In 1963, his father conspired with Profaci family boss Joseph Magliocco to assassinate their three bitter rivals on the Mafia Commission: Gambino crime family boss Carlo Gambino, Lucchese crime family boss Tommy Lucchese, and Buffalo crime family boss and cousin, Stefano Magaddino. However, Profaci capo Joseph Colombo betrayed Joseph Magliocco to the Commission, which then summoned Magliocco to explain. In October 1964, Magliocco was kidnapped off the streets of New York.

== Banana War ==
During his father's two-year absence, Bonanno mobster Gaspar DiGregorio took advantage of family discontent over Bonanno's role to claim family leadership. The Mafia Commission named DiGregorio as Bonanno family boss, and the DiGregorio revolt led to four years of strife in the Bonanno family, labeled by the media as the "Banana War". This led to a divide in the family between loyalists to Bonanno and loyalists to DiGregorio.

In early 1966, DiGregorio allegedly contacted Bonanno about having a peace meeting. Bonanno agreed and suggested his grand-uncle's house on Troutman Street in Brooklyn as a meeting site. On January 28, 1966, as Bonanno and his loyalists approached the house, they were met with gunfire; no one was wounded during this confrontation.

In 1968, DiGregorio was wounded by machine gun fire and later suffered a heart attack. The Commission eventually became dissatisfied with DiGregorio's efforts at quelling the family rebellion, and eventually dropped DiGregorio and swung their support to Paul Sciacca. In 1968, after a heart attack, his father ended the family warfare by agreeing to retire as boss and move to Arizona. As part of this peace agreement, Bonanno also resigned as consigliere and moved out of New York with his father. In later years, Bonanno made the following observation about this period:

I always say I had only one goal in the '60s—actually two goals. When I got up in the morning, my goal was to live to sunset. And when sunset came, my second goal was to live to sunrise.

== Later career in California and Arizona ==
On March 9, 1970, Bonanno was convicted of 52 counts of mail fraud, and sentenced to four years in prison after using a stolen Diners Club card to fund a cross-country trip to supervise some of his fathers' former businesses in 1968. On December 18, 1971, Bonanno and his brother Joe Jr. were convicted of extortion and conspiracy for operating protection rackets in San Jose and San Francisco. In the late 1970s, Bonanno and his brother, Joe Jr., were under increased scrutiny by law enforcement in Northern California after getting involved with Lou Peters, a Cadillac-Oldsmobile dealer, in the San Jose, Lodi and Stockton, California areas. The Bonannos were looking to buy him out for $2 million. Peters, however, became an undercover agent for the FBI.

On January 23, 1981, Bonanno was indicted in Oakland, California on 21 counts of grand theft for defrauding senior citizens in California for home improvements that were never completed. After the trial was postponed nine times since 1981, Bonanno was convicted in November 1985, of conspiracy and theft, and sentenced to four years in prison on March 27, 1986.

== Author and producer ==
Bonanno worked occasionally as a television producer (primarily on mini-series and films related to his family's criminal past), and collaborated with author Gay Talese on the 1971 book Honor Thy Father, a history of the Bonanno crime family. He also co-wrote the novel The Good Guys (2005) with former undercover FBI agent Joseph Pistone and scriptwriter David Fisher. He later co-wrote his final book The Last Testament of Bill Bonanno: The Final Secrets of a Life in the Mafia (2011) with Gary B. Abromovitz.

=== Bound by Honor: A Mafioso's Story ===
Bonanno's autobiography, Bound by Honor: A Mafioso's Story, was published by St. Martin's Press in 1999.

In his memoir, Bonanno theorized that Cuban exiles and the Cosa Nostra murdered John F. Kennedy. He stated that several Cosa Nostra families shared close ties with members of the Cuban exile movement dating back to the mob casinos in Havana before the Cuban Revolution. According to Bonanno, both the Cubans and the Cosa Nostra hated Kennedy enough to kill him. Many exiled Cubans blamed Kennedy for the failure of 1961 Bay of Pigs Invasion of Cuba. The Cosa Nostra felt betrayed when Kennedy's brother and Attorney General, Robert F. Kennedy, opened a strong legal assault on the mob, despite the mob's alleged support for Kennedy in the 1960 presidential election. Bonanno said that he realized the degree of Cosa Nostra involvement in the assassination when he witnessed on television Jack Ruby, an associate of Chicago Outfit mobster Sam Giancana, killing Kennedy assassin Lee Harvey Oswald while in police custody. Bonanno also claimed in the book that he had discussed the assassination of John F. Kennedy with mobster John Roselli and implicated him as the primary hitman in a conspiracy instigated by the mob. According to Bonanno, Roselli fired at Kennedy from a storm drain on Elm Street.

George Anastasia wrote that the book "is not a mob tell-all, but rather a treatise on the demise of the American Mafia told from the perspective of someone ... who witnessed and experienced it firsthand." According to Anastasia, Bonanno "writes longingly of a better time when honor and loyalty, not guns and money, were the cornerstones of the Mafia. It is a fascinating description. But like so much else in Bound by Honor, it is virtually unverifiable." Publishers Weekly said in its review that the book is "big on bluster and short on substance" and that the author's "only apparent goal is to exalt the world of his father". Discussing the allegation that Roselli fired from a storm drain in a conspiracy to assassinate Kennedy, PW said: "overblown claims are just part of a bloviating style windy with references to 'our tradition' and 'our world,' phrases that would have struck a more resonant chord in the mid-70s, when Mario Puzo's books and Francis Ford Coppola's movies introduced the country to the peculiar mix of honor and violence that Bonanno crudely celebrates." Emil Franzi of the Tucson Weekly wrote: "This slice of high-level Mafia existence definitely belongs on the shelves of two different libraries -- collections on organized crime and those on the Kennedy assassination. Besides its obvious historical relevance, it's a fun read loaded with Tucson references."

=== Bonanno: A Godfather's Story ===
In 1999, Bonanno was an executive producer for Showtime's two-part television miniseries, Bonanno: A Godfather's Story. The production was based on Bound by Honor: A Mafioso's Story and his father's 1983 autobiography A Man of Honor.

== Death ==
Bonanno died of a heart attack on the morning of January 1, 2008. He was interred in Holy Hope Cemetery in Tucson.

== In popular culture ==
Bonanno was the main character in the 1971 non-fiction book Honor Thy Father. In the original 1973 made-for-TV Film of the same name based on the book, Bonanno was portrayed by Joseph Bologna. Tony Nardi depicted the adult Joseph Bonanno in Bonanno: A Godfather's Story; Eric Roberts portrayed him in the 1993 made-for-TV film, Love, Honor & Obey: The Last Mafia Marriage.

American Mafia
Preceded by John Tartamella	Bonanno crime family Consigliere; 1964	Succeeded by Nicolino "Nick" Alfano
