= Love, Honor & Obey: The Last Mafia Marriage =

- Screenplay by: Christopher Canaan
- Story by: Rosalie Bonanno
- Directed by: John Patterson
- Starring: Eric Roberts; Nancy McKeon; Ben Gazzara
- Composer: Allyn Ferguson
- Original language: English
- No. of seasons: 1
- No. of episodes: 2

Production
- Producer: Lynn Raynor
- Cinematography: Paul Onorato
- Editor: Robert L. Sinise

Original release
- Network: CBS
- Release: May 23 – May 25, 1993

Love, Honor & Obey: The Last Mafia Marriage is a 1993 American television crime-drama miniseries directed by John Patterson. It is based on the autobiographical novel Mafia Marriage by Rosalie Bonanno.

== Cast ==
- Eric Roberts as Bill Bonanno
- Nancy McKeon as Rosalie Profaci Bonanno
- Ben Gazzara as Joseph Bonanno
- Alex Rocco as Uncle Frank
- Phyllis Lyons as Louise Farentino
- Tomas Milian as Joe Profaci
- Mike Nussbaum as Gaspar DiGregorio
- Peter Jurasik as Father Rosetti
- Joanna Merlin as Rose Profaci
- Dylan Baker as Curtis Pinger
- Joe Petruzzi as Mike Farentino
- Frank Pellegrino as Johnny
- Graham Jarvis as Mr. Vickers
- Gina Philips as Gigi
- John Harkins
- H. Richard Greene
