= Paul Sciacca =

American mobster

- Born: June 15, 1909
- Died: August 27, 1986 (aged 77)
- Allegiance: Bonanno crime family

Paul Sciacca (June 15, 1909 – August 27, 1986) was a New York City mobster who succeeded Joseph Bonanno as boss of the Bonanno crime family in 1968. He was succeeded by Natale Evola in 1971.

== Bonanno family war ==
In 1964, a rivalry in the Bonanno crime family started when boss Joseph Bonanno promoted his son, Salvatore "Bill" Bonanno, to the position of consigliere over senior capo Gaspar DiGregorio. The family broke into two factions: the Bonanno faction and DiGregorio-Sciacca faction. On January 28, 1966, an attempt was made on the life of Salvatore "Bill" Bonanno, the son of Joseph Bonanno. The Bonanno's suspected Paul Sciacca and his crew, who were loyal to Gaspar DiGregorio. The newspapers began calling the Bonanno family war the "Bananas War".

The shooting war began in May 1966 with what became known as "The Troutman St. Ambush", where Bill Bonanno and three of his associates were lured to an alleged peace meeting and then ambushed from doorways, windows and rooftops along Troutman Street, but Bonanno and his associates escaped unharmed. Paul Sciacca and underling Frank Mari were suspected of masterminding the botched hit, but boss Gaspar DiGregorio was blamed for the bad publicity and added police scrutiny that surrounded the shooting.

After Joe Bonanno was deposed by the Commission in late 1964, DiGregorio was named boss by early 1965, he made Pietro "Skinny Pete" Crociata the new underboss and Nicolino "Nick" Alfano the new consigliere. By 1966, the Commission lost faith in DiGregorio's ability to lead the crime family, and Sciacca became the acting boss.

The "Bananas War" raged throughout the second half of the 1960s with Sciacca and his top lieutenant, Frank Mari leading the dissident faction of soldiers and shooters against the Bonanno loyalists. Less than a dozen men were killed during the war, but many low level soldiers and men on both sides were beaten, shot and injured, Sciacca was himself the victim of an attempt on his life. The war should have ended when deposed boss Joe Bonanno suffered a heart attack in 1968 and promised to retire to leave New York for his home in Tucson, Arizona, where he would retire comfortably with a handful of loyal underlings at his side. Also, by 1968, Bonanno successor DiGregorio was in ill health and stepped down as boss and retired, dying only two years later. The Commission sanctioned acting boss Paul Sciacca as the new boss of the Bonanno crime family.

Sciacca promoted Frank Mari, who he thought to be a loyal underling, to be his new underboss, while another Sciacca underling, Michael "Mike" Adamo, was promoted to consigliere. Unknown to boss Sciacca, soon after their promotions Mari and Adamo began to plot against him and planned to remove him from power and possibly eliminate him altogether, but their plans were revealed and on the night of September 18, 1968 both men disappeared, never to be heard from again. Bonanno soldier and former Mari underling Philip "Rusty" Rastelli, a former Bonanno loyalist who switched allegiance to the DiGregoiro-Sciacca side at the start of the war, became a top suspect in the case for New York City police, having also been a top suspect in the Troutman Street ambush. Rastelli, who was promoted to caporegime of the old Mari crew, was never charged in connection with either the ambush or the disappearance, but he was promoted once again to consigliere by boss Paul Sciacca immediately following the disappearance of Adamo, while former Bonanno loyalist Natale "Joe Diamonds" Evola was promoted to underboss in place of Mari.

== The new boss ==
Due to the "Bananas War", in 1968, The Commission forced DiGregorio to retire and officially promoted Sciacca to boss. He became boss of a much weakened crime family as rivalries and internal dissension continued between the former DiGregorio-Sciacca faction and the remaining Bonanno loyalists. Hostilities continued within the Bonanno crime family into 1969, the last known Bonanno crime family member to be killed was soldier Thomas Zummo, a former DiGregorio-Sciacca faction member, who was shot dead on May 6, 1969. With the removal of disloyal underlings Mari and Adamo, Bonanno boss Paul Sciacca attempted to unite his crime family once again by promoting the leaders of the two most influential factions outside his own.

Longtime family member and former Bonanno loyalist Natale Evola was leader of what remained of the former Bonanno faction, while Phil Rastelli had gained a great deal of influence with the younger, up and coming members of the crime family and was now the leader of the "young turks" faction. By promoting Evola to underboss and Rastelli to consigliere, Sciacca hoped to align the Bonanno crime family and bring it back to the level of power and influence within the New York Mafia it once occupied. In terms of numbers the Bonanno crime family had always been one of the smaller of the Five Families, but it was also one of the most cohesive and well structured crime families because most of its administration was family members related by blood or marriage. Sciacca hoped to at least mend the broken ties among members and re-align the three most influential factions within the Bonanno crime family, effectively removing the last of the rivalries and hostilities that were still present, creating cohesion and stability.

== Indictment ==
On May 13, 1971, Sciacca was indicted in Mineola, New York, on charges of selling $100,000 worth of heroin. The charge was later dismissed.

== Death ==
Sciacca died on August 27, 1986, of natural causes at the age of 77.

American Mafia
| Preceded by Gaspar DiGregorio | Bonanno crime family Boss; 1968–1971 | Succeeded by Natale "Joe Diamonds" Evola |
