= Tommy Gagliano =

Italian-American mobster

- Born: Tommaso Gagliano; May 29, 1883; Corleone, Sicily, Kingdom of Italy
- Died: February 16, 1951 (aged 67)
- Resting place: Woodlawn Cemetery, Bronx, New York, U.S.
- Other names: Tom Gagliano; Gaetano Gagliano
- Citizenship: American
- Occupation: Crime boss
- Predecessor: Bonaventura Pinzolo
- Successor: Thomas Lucchese
- Spouse: Josephine Pomilla
- Allegiance: Gagliano crime family
- Conviction: Tax evasion (1932)
- Penalty: 15 months' imprisonment

Thomas Gagliano (born Tommaso Gagliano, Italian: [tomˈmaːzo ɡaʎˈʎaːno]; May 29, 1883 − February 16, 1951) was an Italian-born American mobster and boss of what U.S. federal authorities would later designate as the Lucchese crime family, one of the "Five Families" of New York City. He was a low-profile boss for over two decades. His successor was his longtime loyalist and underboss, Tommy Lucchese.

== Early life ==
Gagliano was born on May 29, 1883, in Corleone, Sicily. He was related to Angelo Gagliano, who founded the Corleone Mafia family. In 1905 Tommy Gagliano immigrated to the United States in New York City, and married Giuseppina "Josephine" Pomilla, who was also from Corleone.

Gagliano and his brother-in-law Nunzio Pomilla were partners in lathing and hoisting companies in the Bronx. He was underboss to Gaetano "Tom" Reina until he became the boss of the family in 1930. The Reina family controlled a monopoly on ice distribution in the Bronx. Gagliano, along with Gaetano "Tommy" Lucchese and Stefano "Steve" Rondelli, were viewed as the most powerful members of the Reina family.

Frank Gagliano was a distant relative of Tommy Gagliano and the son of a deported mobster. He was also the cousin of mob boss Thomas Eboli's chauffeur and bodyguard, future Genovese crime family underboss Dominick Alongi, who would later achieve notoriety when they were among the many mobsters arrested fleeing the famous 1957 Apalachin Meeting. He was a blood relative of mobster Joseph (Pip the Blind) Gagliano, who became a childhood friend and early accomplice of future government witness Joseph Valachi. The two performed many burglaries and armed robberies together.

== Castellammarese War ==
During the late 1920s, a bitter gang rivalry arose in New York between Joseph "the Boss" Masseria, the most powerful mobster in New York, and Salvatore Maranzano, head of the Castellammarese Sicilian clan. Masseria had demanded more money from Reina, prompting Reina to consider switching allegiance to Maranzano. When Masseria heard about Reina's plans, Masseria had him murdered in February 1930. Reina's murder exacerbated the tensions between the two camps, helping launch the Castellammarese War.

To head Reina's gang, Masseria appointed one of his loyalists, Joseph Pinzolo. Both Gagliano and Lucchese hated Pinzolo and resented Masseria appointing an outsider as gang leader. In September 1930, Pinzolo was shot and killed by unknown assailants. To replace Pinzolo, Masseria appointed Gagliano as head of the Reina gang. It is speculated that Gagliano and Lucchese formed a secret alliance with Maranzano at this time while still professing loyalty to Masseria.

As the war continued, Masseria began suffering more defeats and key defections. On April 15, 1931, Masseria was assassinated at a Coney Island restaurant by several of his men. These defectors, guided by Charles "Lucky" Luciano, had made a deal with Maranzano guaranteeing their power if they switched sides.

However, after Masseria's death, Maranzano started promoting himself as the "Boss of All Bosses" for all the Italian-American criminal gangs in the country. Feeling betrayed and threatened, Luciano arranged Maranzano's assassination a few months later in September 1931. During this period of instability, Gagliano remained in control of the Reina gang.

== Cosa Nostra families ==
After Maranzano's death, Luciano restructured all the Italian-American criminal gangs into several crime families regulated by a commission of family bosses. The aim of this restructuring was to settle disputes without bloody gang wars. The New York City gangs were divided into five crime families. Gagliano took over the old Reina family, with Lucchese as his underboss. As a boss, Gagliano became a member of the commission.

In 1932, Gagliano was convicted of tax evasion and sentenced to 15 months in the Atlanta Penitentiary.

Gagliano steered the family through a period of high tension between the Five Families. In 1936, Luciano was sent to prison and then, in 1946, deported to Italy. With Luciano's absence, power on the commission was held by an alliance of bosses Vincent Mangano, Joe Bonanno, Stefano Magaddino and Joe Profaci. Gagliano had to be very careful in the face of this alliance, and was keen to keep a low profile while furthering the business interests of his section of Cosa Nostra, in areas such as gasoline rationing, meat and black market sugar. He usually issued his orders through his close allies, particularly Lucchese, who served as the family's public face and de facto street boss. As a result, very little is known about Gagliano between 1932 and his death from natural causes in the 1950s.

== Death ==
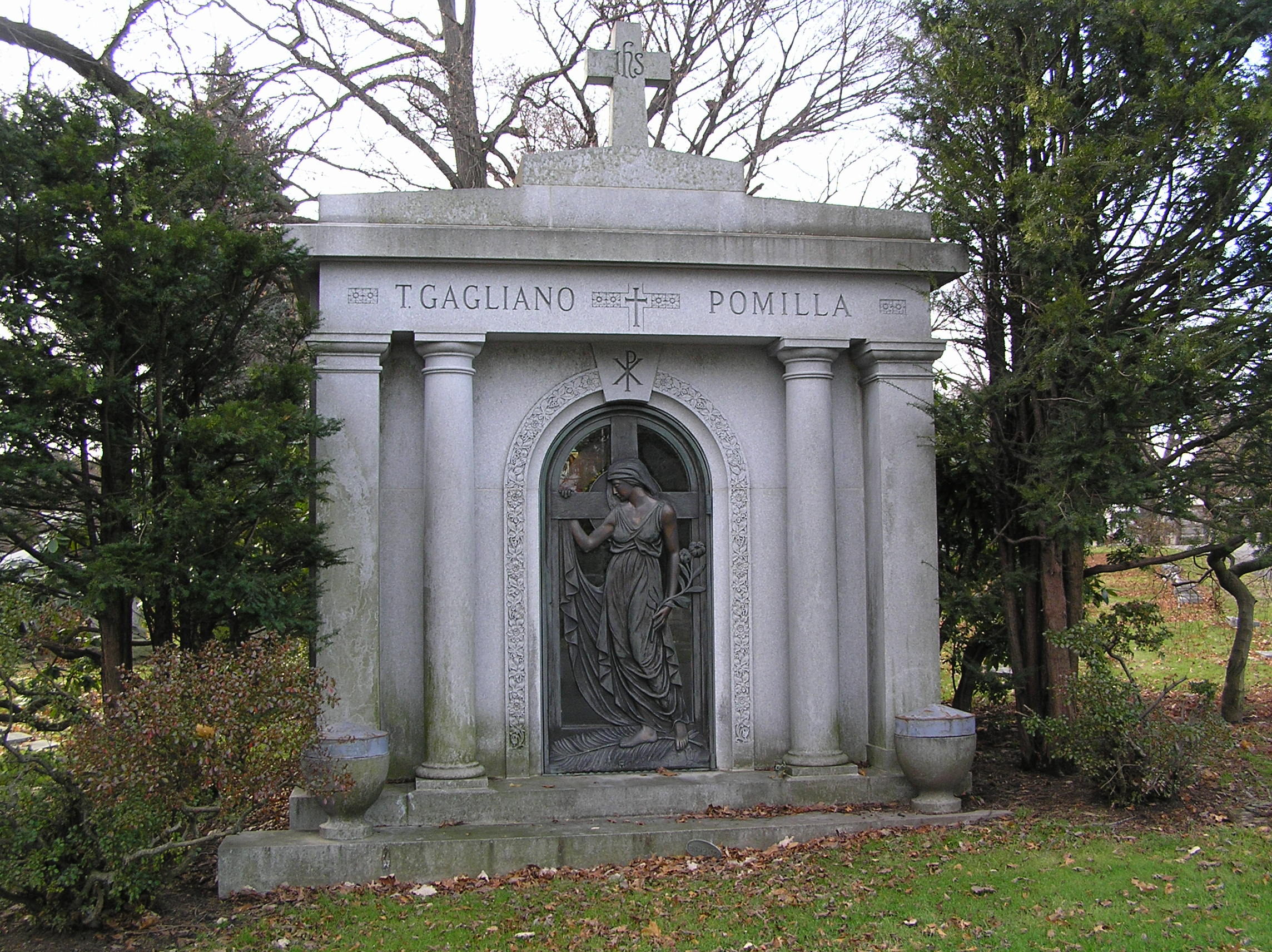
The mausoleum of Tommy Gagliano in Woodlawn Cemetery

In 1951, Lucchese stated during the Senate hearings on organized crime that Gagliano died on February 16, 1951.

Tommy Gagliano is interred in a private mausoleum at Woodlawn Cemetery, Bronx, New York.

== Notes ==
American Mafia
Unknown	Lucchese crime family Underboss; 1922–1930	Succeeded by Tommy Lucchese
Preceded by Joseph Pinzolo	Lucchese crime family Boss; 1931−1951	Succeeded by Tommy Lucchese
