= Michael Mancuso =

American mobster (born 1955)

- Born: July 18, 1955 (age 71); New York City, U.S.
- Other names: "Mickey Nose"; "The Nose"
- Occupation: Crime boss
- Predecessor: Vincent Basciano
- Allegiance: Bonanno crime family
- Convictions: Manslaughter (1984); Murder (2008)
- Penalty: 10 years' imprisonment 15 years' imprisonment

Michael "The Nose" Mancuso (born July 18, 1955) is an American mobster. He is a member of the American Mafia and the boss of the Bonanno crime family, one of Five Families in New York City. In June 2013, while imprisoned, Mancuso was picked as the new official boss of the Bonanno family. On March 12, 2019, Mancuso was released from prison, but was then arrested and released again.

== Biography ==
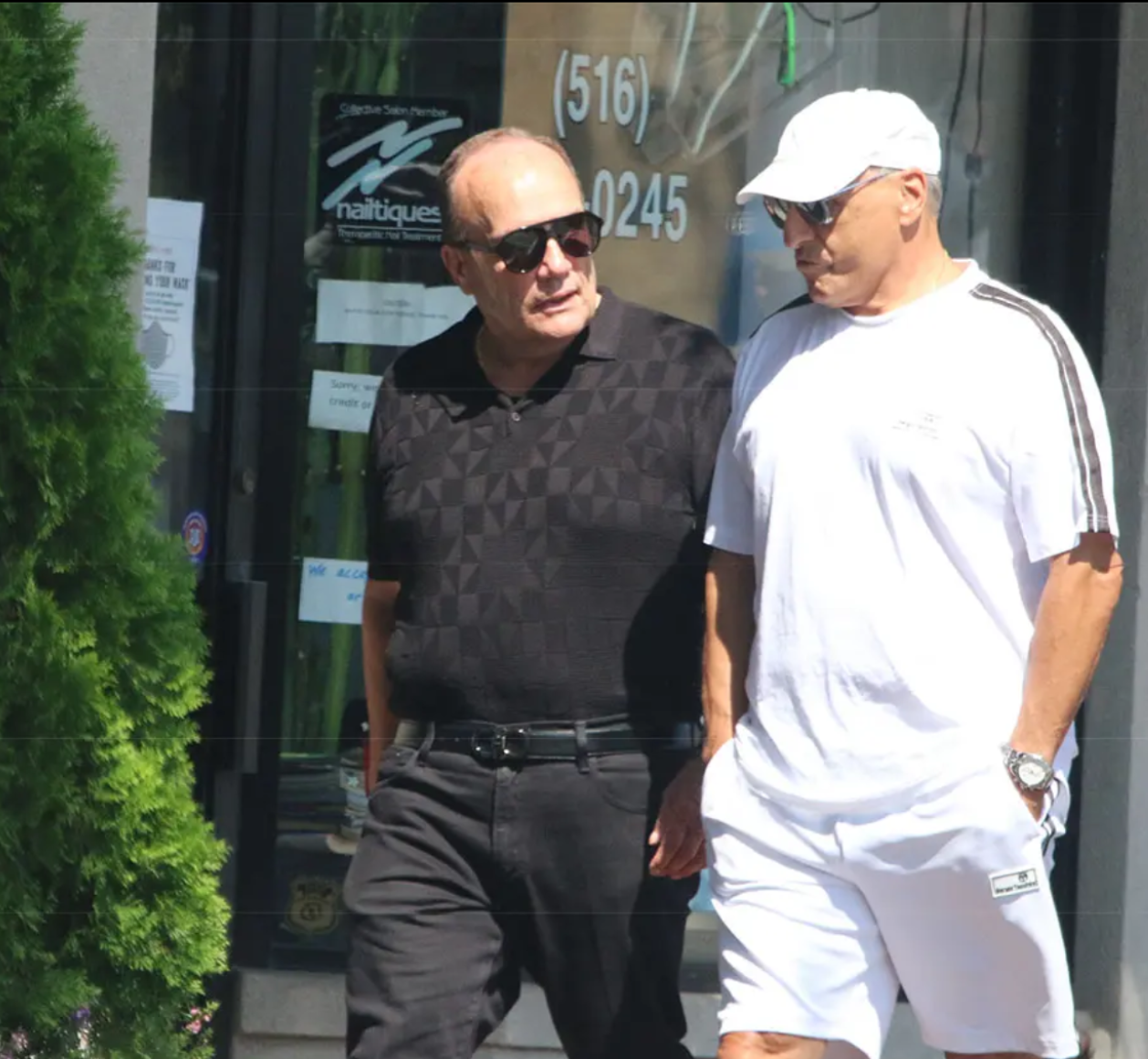
FBI surveillance photo of Michael Mancuso (right) and Johnny Spirito (left)

During the early 1980s, before joining the Bonanno family, Mancuso was affiliated with the East Harlem Purple Gang. In August 1984, Mancuso fatally shot his wife Evelina and left her body on a bench in front of Jacobi Hospital in the Bronx. Mancuso pleaded guilty to manslaughter of his wife and received a 10-year prison sentence.

In 2004, acting boss Vincent Basciano promoted him to the acting underboss position. He became acting boss in November 2004, after Basciano was imprisoned. In May 2005, Joseph Massino implicated Mancuso in the 1999 murder of Gerlando Sciascia. In early 2005, Basciano allegedly ordered Mancuso's murder.

On February 16, 2006, Mancuso was arrested in Las Vegas for ordering the murder of associate Randolph Pizzolo on November 30, 2004. Mancuso followed the orders of imprisoned acting boss Vincent Basciano and arranged Pizzolo's murder. The hit was carried out by soldier Anthony "Ace" Aiello. On August 6, 2008, Mancuso and soldier Aiello pled guilty to murdering Pizzolo. On December 16, 2008, Judge Nicholas Garaufis sentenced Mancuso to 15 years in prison and Aiello to 30 years in prison for the murder of Pizzolo.

In June 2013, Mancuso, while imprisoned for the last five years, was picked as the new official boss of the family. Mancuso was controlling the family through his Bronx associates and underboss Thomas DiFiore. In 2015, he appointed Joseph Cammarano Jr. to serve both as the Bonanno family street boss and acting underboss. In April 2015, it was reported that Mancuso was imprisoned at the Federal Correctional Institution, Danbury, in Danbury, Connecticut. On March 12, 2019, Mancuso was released from federal custody.

On March 9, 2022, Mancuso was arrested and was under investigation for violating the terms of his supervised release by associating with members of organized crime. On July 28, 2023, he was sentenced to a further eleven months in prison in connection with these violations. On July 28, 2024, he was released.

== Notes ==
American Mafia
Preceded by Vincent Badalamenti as acting boss	Bonanno crime family Boss; 2013–present	Succeeded by Incumbent
