= Gaspar DiGregorio =

American mobster

- Born: October 4, 1905; Trapani, Sicily, Italy
- Died: June 11, 1970 (aged 64); Smithtown, New York, U.S.
- Resting place: St. Charles / Resurrection Cemeteries
- Occupation: Mobster
- Allegiance: Bonanno crime family

Gaspar or Gaspare DiGregorio (October 4, 1905 – June 11, 1970) was an American mobster and a high-ranking member of the Bonanno crime family of New York City who was a key figure in the "Banana War".

== Criminal career ==
DiGregorio was born in Trapani, Sicily, and immigrated to the United States from Canada in 1921. He was first married to the sister of Buffalo crime family boss Stefano Magaddino, and later remarried after her death.

=== The Banana War ===
In October 1964, during Joseph Bonanno's two-year absence, Bonanno soldier DiGregorio took advantage of family discontent over Joseph's son Bill Bonanno's role to claim family leadership. The Mafia Commission named DiGregorio as Bonanno family boss, and the DiGregorio revolt led to four years of strife in the Bonanno family, labeled by the media as the "Banana War". This led to a divide in the family between loyalists to Bill and loyalists to DiGregorio.

In early 1966, DiGregorio allegedly contacted Bill about having a peace meeting. Bill agreed and suggested his grand-uncle's house on Troutman Street in Brooklyn as a meeting site. On January 28, 1966, as Bill and his loyalists approached the house, they were met with gunfire; no one was wounded during this confrontation.

In 1968, DiGregorio was wounded by machine gun fire and later suffered a heart attack. The Commission eventually became dissatisfied with DiGregorio's efforts at quelling the family rebellion, and eventually dropped DiGregorio and swung their support to Paul Sciacca. In 1968, after a heart attack, Joseph ended the family warfare by agreeing to retire as boss and move to Arizona. As part of this peace agreement, Bill also stepped down as consigliere and moved out of New York with his father.

== Death ==
On June 15, 1970, Gaspar DiGregorio died of lung cancer at St. John's Episcopal Hospital in Smithtown, New York. He is buried in Saint Charles Cemetery in Farmingdale, New York Section 30, Row X, Grave #60.

He is portrayed by Richard D'Alessandro in Season 3 of TV Series Godfather of Harlem.

American Mafia
Preceded by Joseph "Joe Bananas" Bonanno	Bonanno crime family Boss; 1965–1968	Succeeded by Paul Sciacca
