= Lin Evola =

American painter

- Born: March 27, 1950; Chicago, Illinois, United States
- Education: San Francisco Art Institute
- Known for: Artist, Painter, Sculptor
- Notable work: Renaissance Peace Angel. Permanent exhibit at the National 9/11 Memorial & Museum in New York City

Lin Evola (born 1950) is an American artist. She is best known for making metal sculptures of angels out of melted weapons such as guns or nuclear weapons casings. She has been honored at the United Nations by Sergio Duarte, has collected weapons to build a statue at One Police Plaza in New York City, and has gifted a work to Bill Clinton, "the first recipient of a Peace Angel".

== Peace Angel ==
Evola's "Renaissance Peace Angel" sculpture, composed of bronze and decommissioned weapons, was added as one of the exhibits at the National September 11 Memorial & Museum on October 22, 2018. The work was previously installed in front of Nino's American Kitchen in lower Manhattan following the September 11 attacks. The sculpture's concrete plinth bears the signatures of many Ground Zero workers and volunteers.
