= Vincent Basciano =

American mobster

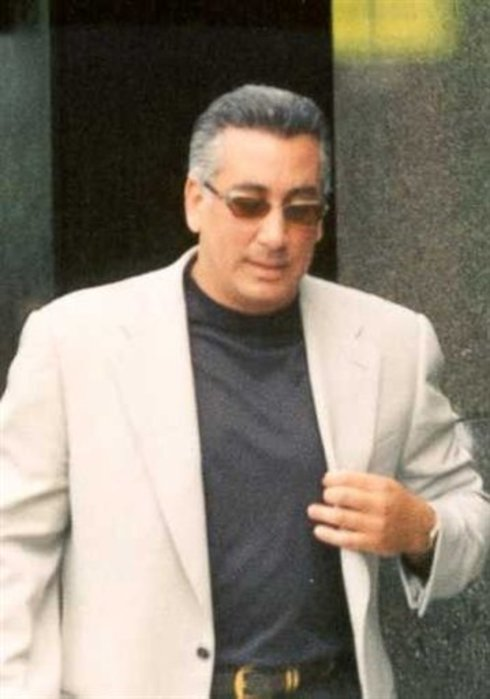
- Born: Vincent John Basciano; November 14, 1959 (age 67); New York City, U.S.
- Other names: Vinny B Vinny from the Bronx; Vinny Gorgeous
- Occupation: Mobster
- Predecessor: Joseph Massino
- Successor: Michael Mancuso
- Allegiance: Bonanno crime family
- Convictions: Weapons possession (1987); Racketeering, conspiracy, illegal gambling, attempted murder (2006); Racketeering, conspiracy, murder, illegal gambling, conspiracy to distribute marijuana, solicitation of murder (2007); Racketeering, murder, conspiracy, firearms possession (2011)
- Penalty: One year imprisonment (1987); Life Imprisonment (2008); Life imprisonment without the possibility of parole (2011)

Vincent John Basciano Sr. (Italian pronunciation: [baʃˈʃaːno]; born November 14, 1959) is an American mobster who became acting boss of the Bonanno crime family after the arrest of Joseph Massino. Basciano was sentenced to life imprisonment without the possibility of parole in 2011.

== Biography ==
Basciano was allegedly inducted as a member of the Bonanno family in 1991, and served in the crew of former Bonanno family captain, Patrick "Patty from the Bronx" DeFilippo, who later died in prison in 2013 after he was sentenced to 35 years in prison.

Basciano is nicknamed "Vinny Gorgeous", due to owning a Throggs Neck, Bronx beauty salon called "Hello Gorgeous", and for his fastidious grooming, hairstyle and looks. In 2011, reporters noted that despite being imprisoned in solitary confinement the past four years, Basciano still looked perfectly groomed in the courtroom.

Arrested in 2004, after a lengthy trial, Basciano was convicted in a racketeering trial for running illegal gambling and attempted murder on May 6, 2006. However, due to a hung jury, Basciano was not convicted of the 2001 murder of Frank Santoro.

After Basciano's first murder trial, prosecutors retried him on those counts on which the jury hung in the first trial. On August 1, 2007, Basciano was convicted of murdering Santoro, who tried to kidnap Basciano's son.

Previous Bonanno boss Joseph Massino turned state's evidence in 2004 and reported that Basciano had conspired to kill prosecutor Greg Andres, but after Massino failed a polygraph test regarding the discussion he agreed to wear a wire when the acting boss Basciano met Massino in jail. Jurors heard one recording of Basciano boasting, "I'm a hoodlum. I'm a tough guy. Whatever happens happens. Let's go." In another, a wistful Massino mused about the demise of the family. "We was OK until I got pinched," he said. "We was on top of the world." While Massino was unable to extract an unambiguous confession regarding Andres, he did record Basciano freely admitting to ordering the murder of associate Randolph "Randy" Pizzolo. On May 16, 2011, Basciano was convicted of ordering the 2004 murder of Pizzolo. On June 1, 2011, a jury rejected a prosecution request for the death penalty and instead sentenced Basciano to life imprisonment. Basciano was initially serving his life sentence at the supermax prison ADX Florence, but was transferred to the nearby United States Penitentiary, Florence High in Florence, Colorado for a time, then USP Big Sandy, and was incarcerated at United States Penitentiary, Coleman. As of 2026 he is incarcerated at United States Penitentiary, Florence High.

On March 6, 2014, Basciano's cousin and lawyer Stephen DiCarmine was indicted and charged with defrauding $250 million in bonds, while being the executive director of white-shoe law firm Dewey & LeBoeuf.

== See also ==
- List of Italian American mobsters
- List of crime bosses convicted in the 21st century

American Mafia
Preceded by Joseph Massino	Bonanno crime family Acting boss 2004–2006	Succeeded by Salvatore Montagna
