= Mustache Pete =

American gangster of Sicilian descent

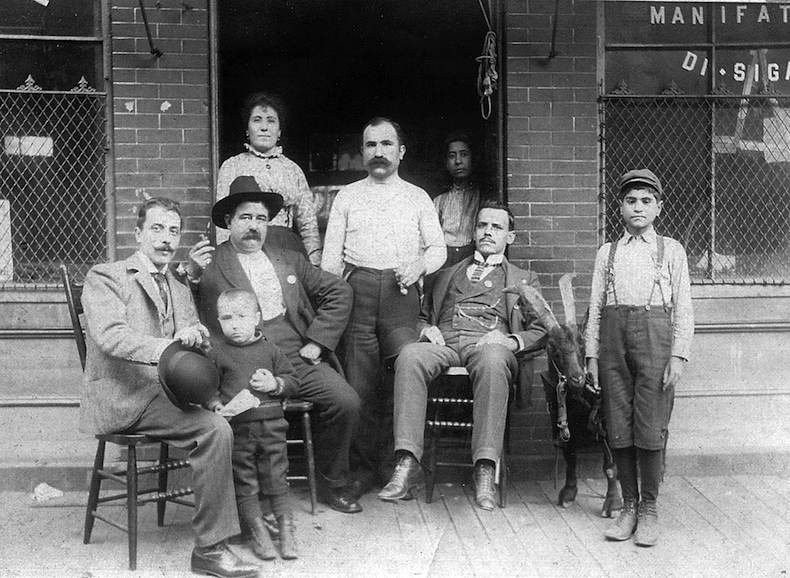
Giosue Gallucci and other Mafiosi, pictured c. 1900.

A Mustache Pete is a term referring to American mafiosi with membership in the Sicilian Mafia who immigrated to the United States (particularly New York City) as adults, largely during the early 20th century prior to the birth of the American Mafia.

== History ==
Unlike the younger Sicilian-Americans, known as the "Young Turks," the old-guard Mustache Petes were seasoned criminals who began their careers in Italy and maintained strong business and personal ties to their former organizations. Their most prominent members were "Joe the Boss" Masseria (1886–1931) and Salvatore Maranzano (1886–1931).

The Mustache Petes were firmly wedded to the existing traditions of Sicilian mafiosi and wanted to maintain them within the emerging American Mafia families. They also had little interest in expanding beyond the small Italian American enclaves in cities on the Eastern Coast, where they could replicate their native culture. To that end, the Mustaches Petes opposed their younger members' desire to work with the powerful Jewish and Irish gangs, or sell narcotics (which they regarded as both immoral and risky).

This annoyed younger caporegimes, such as Lucky Luciano (1897–1962) and Vito Genovese (1897–1969). Luciano and other "Young Turks" concluded that the Mustache Petes were too set in their ways to see the vast profits that working with non-Italian gangsters could bring. During the Castellammarese War (1930–31), Luciano forged a network of younger mafiosi in both the Masseria and Maranzano camps who secretly intended to assassinate one of the older bosses, then bide their time before killing the other.

They decided to kill Masseria and feign loyalty to Maranzano until they had a chance to eliminate him as well. Following the assassination of Maranzano on September 10, 1931, Luciano and his fellow Young Turks reorganized the National Crime Syndicate and founded The Commission, becoming closer to the modern American Mafia.

Journalists marked this day as a purge of older mafiosi, known as the "Night of the Sicilian Vespers." Several days later, on September 13, the corpses of two Maranzano allies, Samuel Monaco and Louis Russo, were retrieved from Newark Bay, showing evidence of torture. Meanwhile, Joseph Siragusa, boss of the Pittsburgh crime family, was shot to death in his home. The October 15 disappearance of Joseph Ardizzone, head of the Los Angeles family, was later regarded as part of this alleged plan to quickly eliminate the Mustache Petes. However, the idea of an organized mass purge, directed by Luciano, has been debunked as a fable; in reality, only about five men were killed.
