= Natale Evola =

American mobster

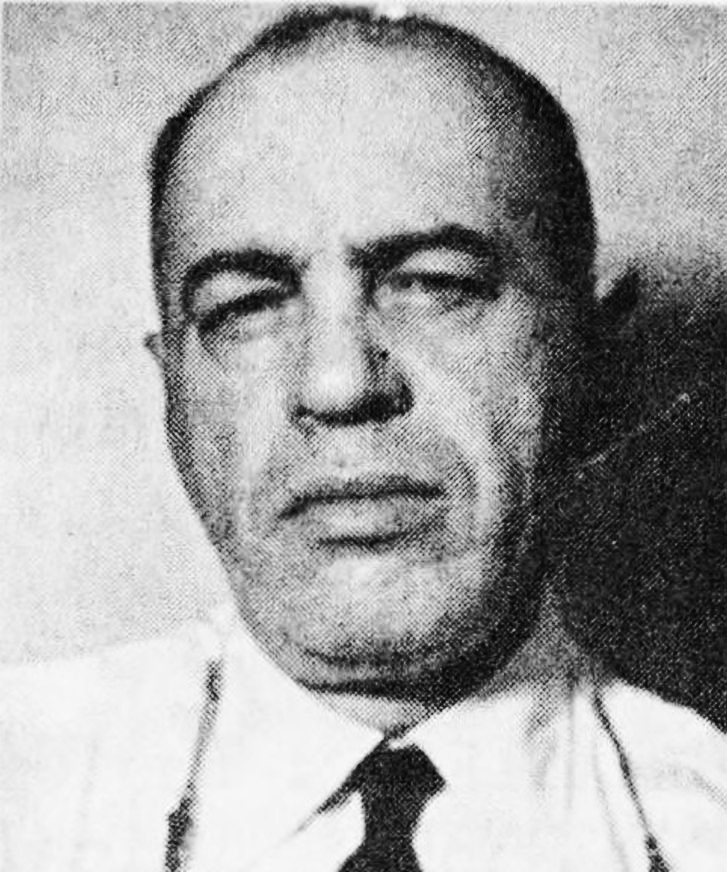
- Evola in the 1960s
- Born: Natale Evola; February 22, 1907; New York City, United States
- Died: August 28, 1973 (aged 66); Columbus Hospital New York
- Resting place: Calvary Cemetery, Woodside, Queens
- Other name: "Joe Diamond"
- Occupation: Crime boss
- Allegiance: Bonanno crime family
- Convictions: Conspiracy (1957); Drug Trafficking (1959)
- Penalty: 10 years imprisonment

Natale "Joe Diamond" Evola (February 22, 1907 – August 28, 1973) was a New York mobster who briefly became boss of the Bonanno crime family after succeeding Paul Sciacca in 1971 until being succeeded by Philip Rastelli.

Natale Evola was born in the Bay Ridge section of Brooklyn to parents Filippo and Francesca Evola, natives of Castellammare del Golfo, Sicily. Natale Evola had two brothers and three sisters. Natale Evola never married and lived with his mother in Bay Ridge.

Evola's arrest record would eventually include coercion, possession of gun, and federal narcotic law violations. Evola was heavily involved in narcotics trafficking and in labor racketeering in the Garment District of Manhattan.

Evola was a close associate of Joseph Bonanno, the original boss of the Bonanno crime family. In 1931, Evola was an usher at Bonanno's wedding.

In 1957, Evola was identified at the infamous Apalachin Meeting in Apalachin, New York and later charged, along with twenty other organized figures, with conspiracy. The case was later overturned.

On April 17, 1959, Evola was sentenced to 10 years in federal prison after being convicted on conspiracy to distribute narcotics. Evola had helped manage a large organization that imported heroin from Sicily to the United States. Following family boss Joe Bonanno's retirement in 1968, Evola reportedly became the boss of the family. Heavily involved in the trucking industry in the Garment District, Evola cooperated with crime family leaders Genovese and Carlo Gambino of the Gambino crime family.

On August 28, 1973, Natale Evola died of cancer at Columbus Hospital in the Bronx. He is buried in Calvary Cemetery in the Woodside, Queens section of New York.

American Mafia
Preceded by Frank "Russo" Mari	Bonanno crime family Underboss; 1968–1971	Succeeded by Philip "Rusty" Rastelli
Preceded by Paul Sciacca	Bonanno crime family Boss; 1971–1973	Succeeded by Carmine Galante
