= Tommy Lucchese =

Italian-American crime boss (1899–1967)

Thomas Lucchese
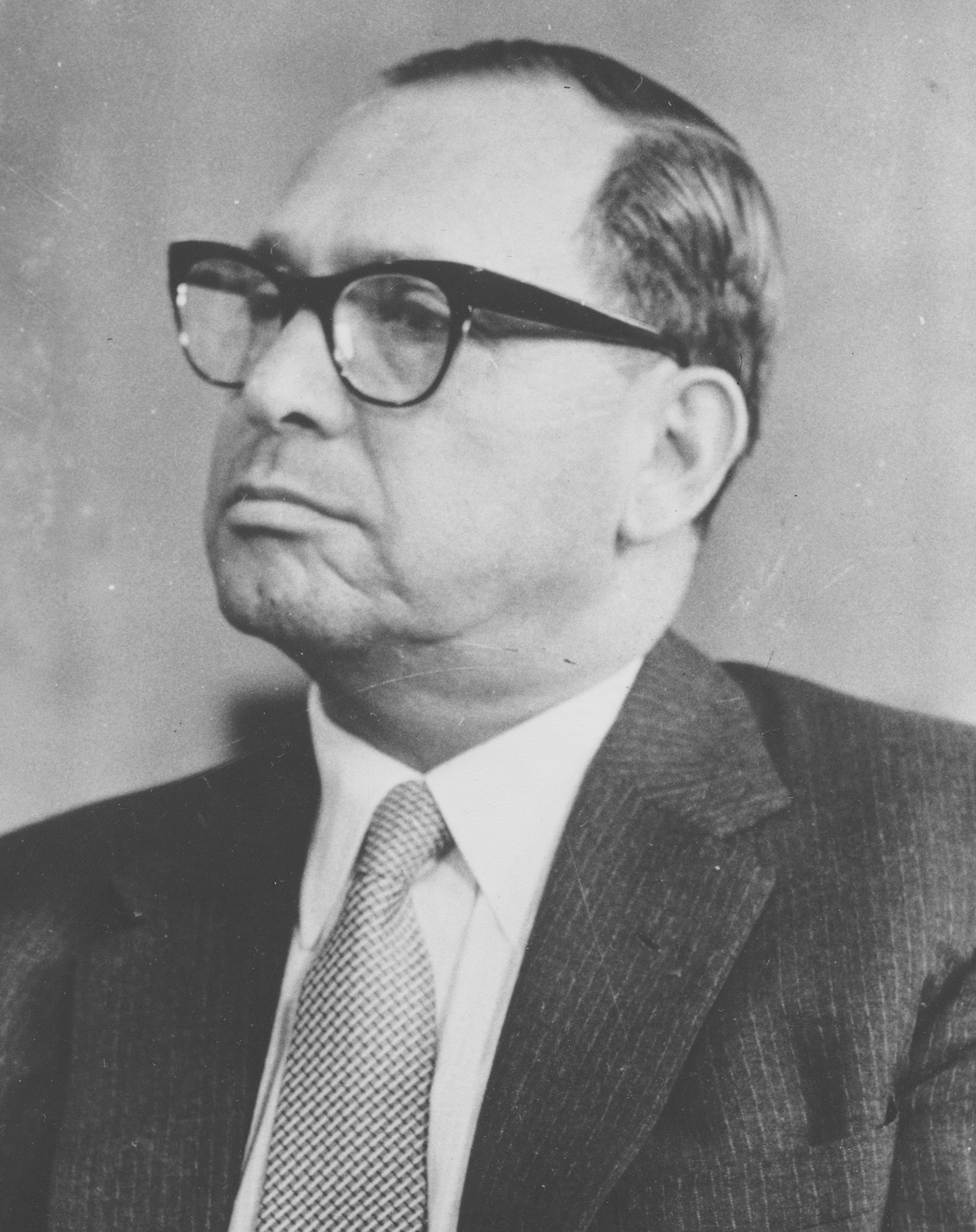
- Lucchese in 1958
- Born: Gaetano Lucchese; December 1, 1899; Palermo, Sicily, Kingdom of Italy
- Died: July 13, 1967 (aged 67); Lido Beach, New York, U.S.
- Resting place: Calvary Cemetery, Queens, New York, U.S.
- Other names: Thomas Luckese, Tommy Brown, Tommy Three-Finger Brown, Thomas Arra
- Citizenship: American
- Occupation: Crime boss
- Predecessor: Tommy Gagliano
- Successor: Carmine Tramunti
- Spouse: Catherine Lucchese
- Children: 2
- Relatives: Joseph Lucchese (brother); Thomas Gambino (son-in-law); Carlo Gambino (co-father-in-law)
- Allegiance: Lucchese crime family

Thomas Gaetano Lucchese (born Gaetano Lucchese, Italian: [ɡaeˈtaːno lukˈkeːze, -eːse]; December 1, 1899 – July 13, 1967), nicknamed "Tommy Three-Finger Brown", was an Italian-American gangster who was a key figure in the Mafia in the United States, an offshoot of the Cosa Nostra in Sicily, for more than thirty years. From 1951 until 1967, he was the boss of the Lucchese crime family, one of the Five organized crime families in New York City.

== Early life ==
Gaetano Lucchese was born on December 1, 1899, to Baldassarre and Francesca Lucchese in Palermo, Sicily. The surname "Lucchese" suggests family origins from the Sicilian city of Lucca Sicula. In early 1911, the Lucchese family emigrated to the United States, settling in Manhattan's Italian neighborhood of East Harlem. The family first lived in a building at 213 East 106th Street before moving to 316 East 118th Street; both buildings were in the Italian East Harlem neighborhood.

Lucchese's father worked hauling cement. As a teen Lucchese worked in a machine shop until 1915, when an industrial accident amputated his right thumb and forefinger. In the early 1930s, Lucchese along with his family moved to an apartment at 100-18 Northern Boulevard in Corona, Queens, the area known as the "Little Italy of Queens".

Lucchese was 5 feet 4 inches (163 cm). He had three brothers Joseph, Vincent (Jimmy), and Anthony (Nino) who all followed him into a life of organized crime. In 1943, Lucchese became a naturalized citizen of United States.

Lucchese married Catherine and they had two children, Frances and Baldesare. The family lived at 104 Parsons Blvd in Malba, Queens before moving in 1950 to 74 Royat Street in Lido Beach, Long Island. Lucchese's daughter, Frances would marry Tommy Gambino, the son of Carlo Gambino, the boss of the Gambino crime family, which formed a strong bond between the two crime families.

== 107th Street gang ==
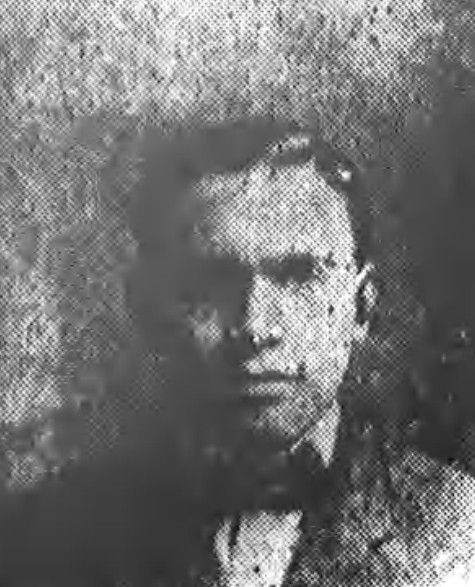
Lucchese mugshot in 1922

After his accident, Lucchese spent more time with members of the 107th Street gang. Members of the gang stole wallets, burglarized stores, and engaged in other illegal activities. The 107th Street gang operated under the protection of Bronx–East Harlem family boss Gaetano "Tom" Reina. By the age of eighteen, Lucchese had started a window washing company in East Harlem; anyone refusing to use his window washing services would have their windows broken. Lucchese sometimes operated out of a political club off East 106th Street in East Harlem. By the early 1920s, Lucchese had become a strong ally of fellow mobster Charlie "Lucky" Luciano and became a top member of Gaetano Reina's crime family.

During Lucchese's criminal career he was only arrested six times; his first arrest was in 1920 and the last in 1935. He never served a lengthy prison sentence.

In 1920, Lucchese was arrested in Riverhead, Long Island, on grand larceny charges after stealing a car. During his booking, a police officer compared Lucchese's deformed hand with that of Mordecai "Three Finger" Brown, a popular Major League Baseball pitcher. The officer nicknamed Lucchese "Three Finger Brown", an alias that Lucchese always disliked.

In January 1921, Lucchese was convicted of auto theft and sentenced on March 27, 1922 to three years and nine months in prison. Lucchese served thirteen months at Sing Sing Correctional Facility before he was paroled. It would be Lucchese's only conviction.

Lucchese was released from prison in 1923, three years into prohibition. His old friends Charlie Luciano, Frank Costello, and Meyer Lansky had become partners with Jewish gangster Arnold "The Brain" Rothstein selling bootleg alcohol.

In August 1927, Lucchese was arrested under the alias of "Thomas Arra" and charged with receiving stolen goods. On July 18, 1928, Lucchese was arrested along with his brother-in-law, Joseph "Joe Palisades" Rosato, for the murder of Louis Cerasuolo; the charges were later dropped. Lucchese was arrested on three other occasions in his lifetime: in 1930 for murder, in 1931 as part of an investigation, and in 1935 for vagrancy, but in all three cases he was released and all charges were dropped.

== Castellammarese War ==
In early 1931, the Castellammarese War broke out between Joe Masseria and Salvatore Maranzano. Maranzano triumphed after Luciano agreed to engineer the death of his boss, Masseria, in return for receiving Masseria's rackets and becoming Maranzano's second-in-command. After Masseria was shot dead April 15, 1931 at a meeting with Luciano at a restaurant called Nuova Villa Tammaro on Coney Island Luciano took over Masseria's family.

Maranzano soon began, however, to plan Luciano's elimination as well. Later that summer Lucchese, who had become close with Maranzano, alerted Luciano that Maranzano had hired Vincent "Mad Dog" Coll to murder him, as well as his associates Vito Genovese and Frank Costello. Luciano responded by organizing a team to kill Maranzano first.

On September 10, 1931, when Maranzano summoned Luciano, Genovese, and Costello to a meeting at his office, they knew Maranzano would kill them there. Instead, Luciano sent four Jewish gangsters whose faces were unknown to Maranzano's people to Maranzano's office, posing as IRS agents. After Lucchese identified Maranzano with a movement of his head the gunmen took Maranzano into his private office, where he was murdered. As Lucchese and the four hitmen fled the scene after Maranzano's death they crossed paths with Coll, who had come to Maranzano's office to kill Luciano, Genovese, and Costello instead.

In the aftermath of Maranzano's murder Luciano subsequently created The Commission to serve as the governing body for organized crime. The old structure, in which first Masseria and then Maranzano claimed to be boss of all bosses in New York City was abandoned in favor of recognition of five crime families or borgatas, each operating in particular areas and activities, with Luciano the first among equals. Tommy Gagliano, who had risen to leadership of the Reina family during the Castellammarese War, headed one of the five families; Lucchese was his underboss.

== Underboss to Gagliano ==
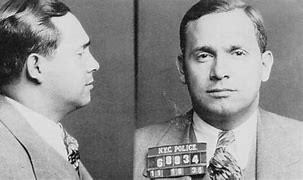
Lucchese mugshot on November 18, 1935 arrested for vagrancy

Due to Luciano's reforms, the New York City underworld entered a long period of peace. From 1932 onward, Gagliano kept a very low profile; almost nothing is known about him from then onward. He preferred to issue his orders through close allies, particularly Lucchese, who was his underboss and the family's public face. In 1946 Lucchese attended the mob's Havana Conference in Cuba as Gagliano's representative.

Luciano's predominance on the Commission did not last; after his conviction on compulsory prostitution charges in 1936 and his deportation in 1946, power struggles within his own crime family and between the five families came to the fore. Gagliano was at a disadvantage in these conflicts, being outnumbered in the Commission by an alliance of the Bonanno, Magaddino, Profaci and Mangano families.

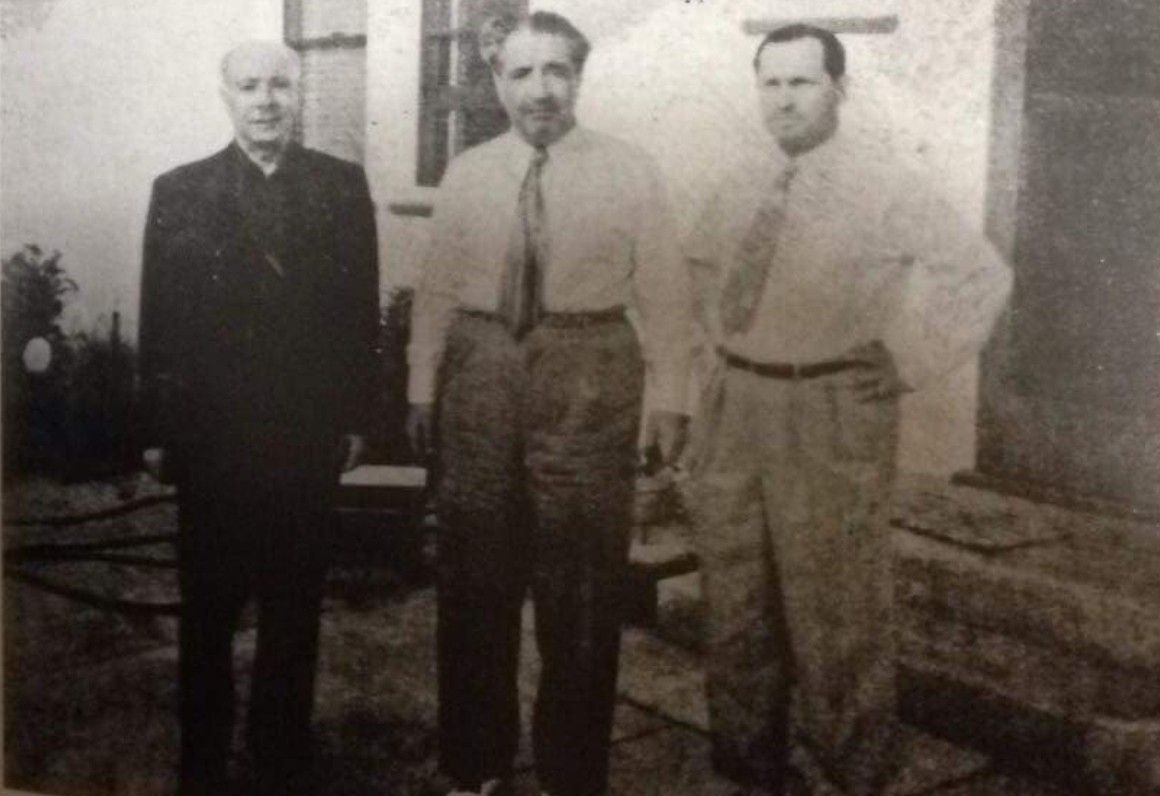
L to R future underboss Stefano LaSalle, LA crime family boss Jack Dragna and Lucchese c. 1948

During his years as underboss Lucchese formed an alliance with Louis Buchalter and together they controlled many of the largest locals of the International Ladies Garment Workers Union in the garment district. The Gagliano family also dominated unions in the trucking, construction and food industries and had undisclosed ownership interests in several Manhattan nightclubs.

Lucchese also made millions of dollars throughout his career by offering "knockdown loans" to cash-strapped garment manufacturers and contractors that extracted interest at usurious rates. Lucchese also had ownership interests in more than a dozen garment shops in New York and Pennsylvania, which also served as a legitimate cover for income tax purposes.

The Gagliano family was also active in other fields: a kosher chicken cartel, drug trafficking, and fixing professional boxing matches. Working through Frankie Carbo, a former Murder, Inc. hitman, the Gagliano family managed a number of boxers, taking a cut of both the winner's purse and the promoter's profits, while making even more money by betting on fixed fights Carbo had arranged.

== Boss of the family ==
In 1951, Gagliano died of natural causes. As underboss and de facto street boss for two decades, Lucchese was the obvious successor, and the family was quickly renamed the Lucchese crime family. Lucchese appointed mobsters Stefano LaSalle as underboss and Vincenzo Rao as consigliere. That same year, Lucchese formed an alliance with Luciano crime family underboss Vito Genovese and Anastasia crime family underboss Carlo Gambino with the long-term goal of gaining control of the Commission.

Lucchese became one of the most well-respected Cosa Nostra bosses of the post-war era. His political connections had already enabled him to become a naturalized American citizen in 1943 and to obtain a Certificate of Good Conduct that expunged the record of his arrests twenty years earlier. He maintained close relationships with New York City politicians, including Mayors William O'Dwyer and Vincent Impellitteri.

The government later sought to revoke his citizenship. On November 17, 1952, U.S. Attorney General James P. McGranery initiated denaturalization proceedings against Lucchese. In its filing, the government claimed that Lucchese did not reveal his entire arrest record and all of his aliases when applying for citizenship. The government's petition was dismissed on a technicality; the dismissal was upheld by the Supreme Court in 1958. Although the Justice Department brought a new denaturalization petition against Lucchese the next day, Lucchese was never denaturalized or deported.

Lucchese concentrated on the core Cosa Nostra values of making money, keeping a low public profile, and avoiding criminal prosecution. The Lucchese family came to dominate Manhattan's garment district and the related trucking industry by gaining control of key unions and trade associations.

During the 1950s, Lucchese controlled a narcotic trafficking network with Santo Trafficante Jr., the boss of the Tampa crime family. Lucchese had maintained a longtime alliance with Trafficante Jr.'s father Santo Trafficante Sr., the former boss of the Tampa mafia family and during the 1940s, helped train Trafficante Jr., in the mafia traditions. Trafficante Jr. would frequently meet with Lucchese in New York City for dinner.

== Alliance with Gambino and Genovese ==
In 1957, Lucchese and his allies decided to attack the bosses of the Luciano and Anastasia crime families to gain Commission control. On May 3, 1957, gunman Vincent Gigante wounded Costello, Luciano's successor as head of the family. Shaken by the assassination attempt, Costello soon retired, leaving Genovese as boss. On October 25, 1957, Albert Anastasia was assassinated in a hotel barbershop and Carlo Gambino became the boss of the Anastasia (renamed Gambino) family.

In 1957, Genovese called a national mob meeting to legitimize his control of the Luciano family. The meeting was held at the rural home of mobster Joseph "Joe the Barber" Barbara in Apalachin, New York. On November 14, 1957, the New York State Police raided the gathering and arrested 61 fleeing gangsters. Lucchese had not yet arrived in Apalachin and therefore avoided arrest. However, his consigliere Vincenzo Rao, Gambino, Genovese and other mob leaders were detained.

Genovese's humiliation motivated the new alliance of Luciano, Costello, Lansky, Gambino and Lucchese to set up Genovese's later elimination. Two years later, with the help of the alliance, Genovese was arrested on narcotics trafficking charges. Genovese was convicted and sent to prison, where he died in 1969. With the alliance backing him, Gambino now controlled the Commission.

== Lucchese and Gambino ==
In 1962, Carlo Gambino's oldest son, Thomas Gambino, married Lucchese's daughter Frances. Over 1,000 guests attended the wedding, at which Carlo Gambino presented Lucchese with a $30,000 gift. In return, Lucchese gave Gambino a part of his rackets at Idlewild Airport (since renamed John F. Kennedy Airport). Lucchese exercised control over airport management security and all the airport unions. As a team, Lucchese and Gambino now controlled the airport, the Commission, and most organized crime in New York City.

== Commission plot ==
In 1963, Joseph Magliocco and Bonanno boss Joseph Bonanno hatched an audacious plan to murder Commission bosses Carlo Gambino, Lucchese, and Stefano Magaddino, as well as Frank DeSimone, and take over the Mafia Commission. Joseph Magliocco gave the murder contract to Joseph Colombo. Colombo either feared for his life, or sensed an opportunity for advancement, and instead reported the plot to The Commission. The Commission, realizing that Bonanno was the real mastermind, ordered both Magliocco and Bonanno to explain. Bonanno went into hiding in Montreal, but a badly shaken Magliocco appeared and confessed everything; he was fined $50,000 and forced into retirement.

== Death and burial ==
On July 13, 1967, Lucchese died of a brain tumor at his home in the Lido Beach area of Long Island. The funeral service was held at Our Lady of the Miraculous Medal Church in Point Lookout, New York and Lucchese was buried at Calvary Cemetery in Queens, New York. Over 1,000 mourners, including politicians, judges, policemen, racketeers, drug pushers, pimps, and hitmen attended the ceremony. Undercover policemen photographed the attendees. At the time of his death, he had not spent a day in prison in 44 years.

Lucchese's first choice as a successor had been Antonio "Tony Ducks" Corallo, but Corallo was in prison when Lucchese died. Lucchese's second choice, Ettore Coco, was also in legal trouble and served a short time as boss. Another possible candidate was consigliere Vincenzo Rao, but he too was dealing with criminal charges. The Commission finally selected capo Carmine Tramunti as temporary acting boss until Corallo was released from prison.

== In popular culture ==
- In the 1981 television film The Gangster Chronicles, Lucchese is portrayed by Jon Polito.
- In Gangster Wars (1981), Lucchese is portrayed by Jon Polito.
- He is portrayed by Michael Rispoli on the 2022 TV series The Offer.
- He is portrayed by Bo Dietl on the Epix TV series Godfather of Harlem.

== Sources ==
- Bureau of Narcotics, Sam Giancana, United States Treasury Department. Mafia: The Government's Secret File on Organized Crime. Skyhorse Publishing, 2009.
- Harrell, G. T. (2009). For Members Only: The Story of the Mob's Secret Judge. Arthur House Publishing.
- Volkman, Ernest (1998). Gangbusters: The Destruction of America's Last Great Mafia Dynasty. New York: Avon Books.
- Ragano, Frank; Raab, Selwyn (1994). Mob Lawyer. Charles Scribner's Sons.

American Mafia
Preceded by Tommy Gagliano	Lucchese crime family Underboss; 1930–1951	Succeeded by Stefano LaSalle
Preceded by Tommy Gagliano	Lucchese crime family Boss; 1951–1967	Succeeded by Carmine Tramunti
