= The Commission (American Mafia) =

Governing body of the American Mafia

- Founded by: Charles Luciano
- Founding location: New York City, U.S.
- Years active: 1931–present
- Territory: New York City, Chicago, and other Mafia-stronghold areas in the United States
- Ethnicity: Sicilians, Sicilian Americans, Italians, Italian Americans hold seats

The Commission is the governing body of the American Mafia, formed in 1931 by Charles "Lucky" Luciano following the Castellammarese War. The Commission replaced the title of capo di tutti i capi ("boss of all bosses"), held by Salvatore Maranzano before his murder, with a ruling committee that consists of the bosses of the Five Families of New York City, as well as the bosses of the Chicago Outfit and, at various times, the leaders of other families, such as New England, Buffalo, Philadelphia, Detroit, and others. The purpose of the Commission was to oversee all Mafia activities in the United States and serve to mediate conflicts among families.

Throughout the history of the Commission, the body has been involved in several incidents including the Apalachin meeting in 1957, a plot to kill several members of the Commission in 1963, and the Mafia Commission Trial in 1985.

== History ==
=== Pre-Commission ===
Pre-1931, capo dei capi (boss of bosses) was a term applied by mobsters to Giuseppe Morello around 1900, according to Nick Gentile. Bosses Joe Masseria (1928–1931) and Salvatore Maranzano (1931) used the title as part of their efforts to centralize control of the Mafia under themselves. When Maranzano won the Castellammarese War, he set himself up as boss of all bosses, created the Five Families, and ordered every Mafia family to pay him tribute. This provoked a rebellious reaction which led to him being murdered in September 1931, on the orders of Lucky Luciano.

=== The Commission's formation ===
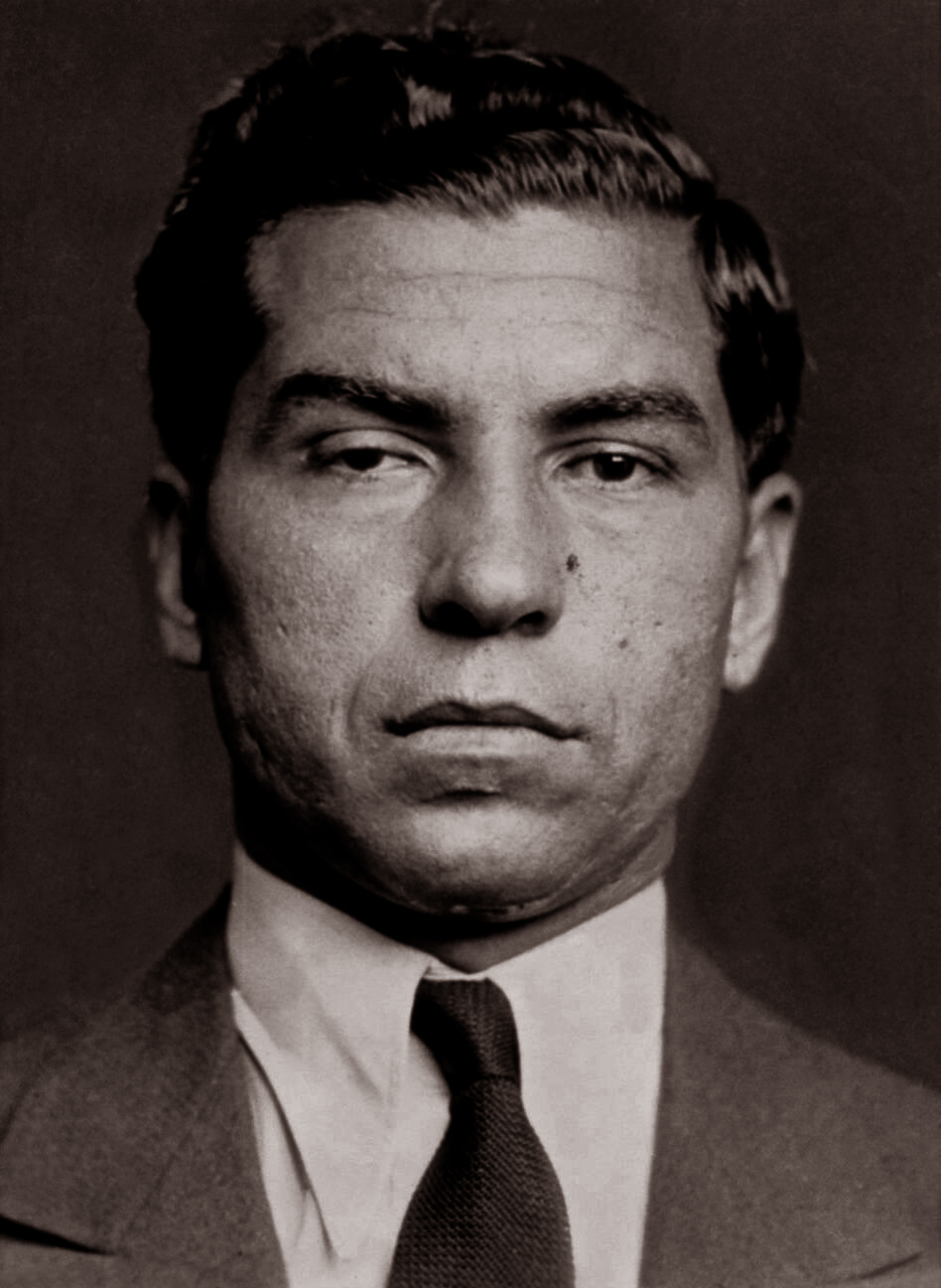
Charles "Lucky" Luciano, the founder of the Commission

After Maranzano's murder in 1931, Luciano called a meeting in Chicago. Although there would have been few objections had Luciano declared himself capo di tutti i capi, he abolished the title, believing the position created trouble between the families and made himself a target for another ambitious challenger. Luciano's goals with the Commission were to quietly maintain his own power over all the families and to prevent future gang wars; the bosses approved the idea of the Commission. The Commission would consist of a "board of directors" to oversee all Mafia activities in the United States and serve to mediate conflicts between families.

The Commission consisted of seven family bosses: the leaders of New York's Five Families: Charlie "Lucky" Luciano, Vincent Mangano, Tommy Gagliano, Joseph Bonanno, and Joe Profaci; Chicago Outfit boss Al Capone; and Buffalo family boss Stefano Magaddino. Charlie Luciano was appointed chairman of the Commission. The Commission agreed to hold meetings every five years or when they needed to discuss family problems.

=== The power of the Commission ===
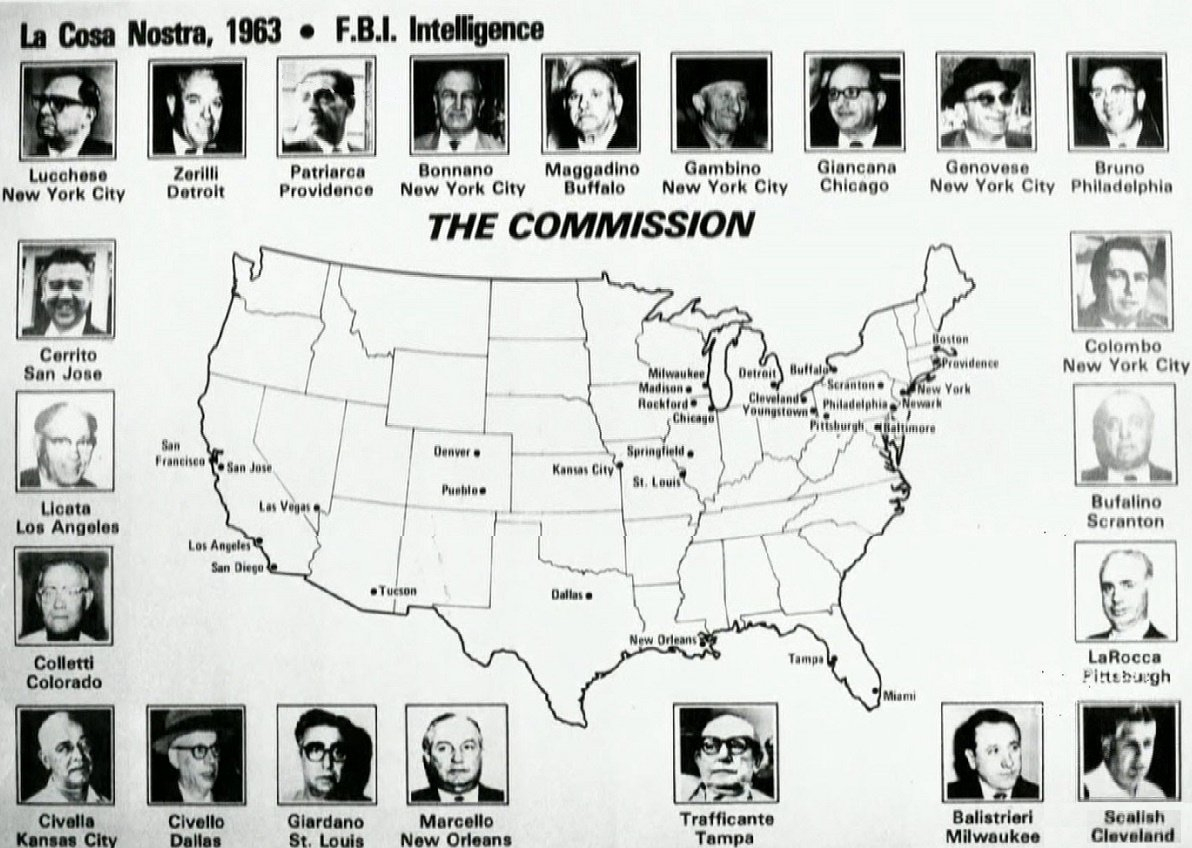
FBI chart of American Mafia bosses across the country in 1963

The Commission held the power of approving a new boss before he could take over officially. The New York Five Families also decided that the names of all new proposed members must be approved by the other families. After the new proposed member was approved by the other families, he could become a made man.

The Commission allowed Jewish mobsters Meyer Lansky, Bugsy Siegel, Louis "Lepke" Buchalter, Dutch Schultz, and Abner "Longie" Zwillman to work alongside them and participate in some meetings. The group's first test came in 1935, when it ordered Dutch Schultz to drop his plans to murder Special Prosecutor Thomas E. Dewey. Luciano argued that a Dewey assassination would precipitate a massive law enforcement crackdown. An enraged Schultz said he would kill Dewey anyway and walked out of the meeting. Murder, Inc. leader Albert Anastasia approached Luciano with information that Schultz had asked him to stake out Dewey's apartment building on Fifth Avenue. Upon hearing the news, the Commission held a discreet meeting to discuss the matter. After six hours of deliberations, the Commission ordered Lepke Buchalter to eliminate Schultz. On October 23, 1935, before he could kill Dewey, Schultz was shot in a tavern in Newark, New Jersey, and succumbed to his injuries the following day.

On May 13, 1936, Luciano's pandering trial began. Dewey prosecuted the case that Eunice Carter built against Luciano. He accused Luciano of being part of a massive prostitution ring known as "the Combination". During the trial, Dewey exposed Luciano for lying on the witness stand through direct quizzing and records of telephone calls; Luciano also had no explanation for why his federal income tax records claimed he made only $22,000 a year, while he was obviously a wealthy man. On June 7, Luciano was convicted on 62 counts of compulsory prostitution. On June 18, he was sentenced to 30 to 50 years in state prison, along with Betillo and others.

The Navy, the State of New York and Luciano reached a deal: in exchange for a commutation of his sentence, Luciano promised the complete assistance of his organization in providing intelligence to the Navy. Anastasia, a Luciano ally who controlled the docks, allegedly promised no dockworker strikes during war. In preparation for the 1943 Allied invasion of Sicily, Luciano allegedly provided the US military with Sicilian Mafia contacts. This collaboration between the Navy and the Mafia became known as Operation Underworld. On January 3, 1946, as a presumed reward for his alleged wartime cooperation, Dewey reluctantly commuted Luciano's pandering sentence on condition that he did not resist deportation to Italy. Luciano accepted the deal, although he still maintained that he was a US citizen and not subject to deportation. On February 2, 1946, two federal immigration agents transported Luciano from Sing Sing prison to Ellis Island in New York Harbor for deportation proceedings. On February 10, Luciano's ship sailed from Brooklyn harbor for Italy.

In 1951, Vincent Mangano disappeared, and his brother Philip Mangano was found dead near Sheepshead Bay, Brooklyn, allegedly on the orders of family underboss Albert Anastasia. Subsequently, Albert Anastasia sided with "liberal-American faction" members Frank Costello and Tommy Lucchese. The power of the Commission shifted from the "conservative-Sicilian faction" to the "liberal-American faction".

With Mangano gone, Frank Costello became the Commission leader for the "liberal faction", and Joseph Bonanno became the leader of the "conservative faction". The liberal faction was supported by those who were also open to working with non-Italian organizations and/or drugs; these supporters included Vito Genovese, Tommy Lucchese and Carlo Gambino (who was opposed to drugs). The conservative faction was more reserved, with an older Italian tradition of honor and loyalty, and included Joe Profaci and Stefano Magaddino.

After a 1956 Commission meeting, the crime families of Philadelphia, headed by Angelo Bruno, and Detroit, headed by Joseph Zerilli, were added to the Commission, with smaller families being formally represented by a Commission family.

=== Apalachin meeting ===
A year later, on November 14, 1957, the Apalachin meeting was called by Genovese at the Upstate New York estate of Joseph Barbara to discuss the future of Cosa Nostra. However, the meeting was aborted when police investigated the destination of the many out-of-state attendees' vehicles and arrested many of the fleeing mafiosi. About 100 mobsters attended the meeting, and over 60 of those were apprehended; all those apprehended were fined, up to $10,000 each, and given prison sentences ranging from three to five years; however, all the convictions were overturned on appeal in 1960. In any case, Bonanno suffered a heart attack and was removed from testifying in the trial.

Long-time FBI director J. Edgar Hoover had denied the existence of a "National Crime Syndicate" and the need to address organized crime in the United States. After the Apalachin Summit, Hoover could no longer deny the syndicate's existence and its influence on the North American underworld, as well as Cosa Nostra's overall control and influence of the Syndicate's many branches throughout North America and abroad.

After the Apalachin Meeting, Hoover created the "Top Hoodlum Program" and went after the syndicate's top bosses throughout the country.

=== Commission plot ===
In 1963, Joe Bonanno made plans to assassinate several rivals on the Commission—bosses Tommy Lucchese, Carlo Gambino, and Stefano Magaddino, as well as Frank DeSimone. Bonanno sought Profaci crime family boss Joseph Magliocco's support, and Magliocco readily agreed due to his bitterness from being denied a seat on the Commission previously. Bonanno's audacious goal was to take over the Commission and make Magliocco his right-hand man.

Magliocco was assigned the task of killing Lucchese and Gambino, and gave the contract to one of his top hit men, Joseph Colombo. However, the opportunistic Colombo revealed the plot to its targets. The other bosses realized that Magliocco could not have planned this himself. Remembering how close Bonanno was with Magliocco (and before him, Joe Profaci), as well as their close ties through marriages, the other bosses concluded Bonanno was the real mastermind.

The Commission summoned Bonanno and Magliocco to explain themselves. In mid 1964, Bonanno fled to Montreal, leaving Magliocco to deal with the Commission. Badly shaken and in failing health, Magliocco confessed his role in the plot. The Commission spared Magliocco's life, but forced him to retire as Profaci family boss and pay a $50,000 fine. As a reward for turning on his boss, Colombo took control of the Profaci family.

=== Trial ===
As part of the Mafia Commission Trial, on February 25, 1985, nine New York Mafia leaders were indicted for narcotics trafficking, loansharking, gambling, labor racketeering and extortion against construction companies under the Racketeer Influenced and Corrupt Organizations Act. On July 1, 1985, the original nine men, with the addition of two more New York Mafia leaders, pleaded not guilty to a second set of racketeering charges as part of the trial. Prosecutors aimed to strike at all the crime families at once using their involvement in the Commission. One of the original defendants, Aniello Dellacroce, died of cancer on December 2, 1985. Another, Paul Castellano, was murdered on December 16, 1985.

According to Colombo hitman and FBI informant Gregory Scarpa, Persico and Gambino boss John Gotti backed a plan to kill the lead prosecutor, and future New York mayor, Rudy Giuliani in late 1986, but it was rejected by the rest of the Commission.

In the early 1980s, the Bonannos became the first New York family to be expelled from the Commission, due to the successful infiltration of FBI agent Joseph Pistone, also known as Donnie Brasco. Although Rastelli was one of the men initially indicted, the family's removal from the Commission actually allowed him to be excused from the Commission Trial, and he was later indicted on separate labor racketeering charges. Having previously lost their seat on the Commission, the Bonannos suffered less exposure than the other families in this case.

Eight defendants were convicted of racketeering on November 19, 1986, with the exception of Anthony Indelicato, who was convicted of murder. The eight defendants were sentenced on January 13, 1987.

In the early 1990s, as the Colombo crime family war raged, the Commission refused to allow any Colombo member to sit on the Commission and considered dissolving the family.

=== Status ===
According to Joseph Massino, former boss of the Bonanno family, the last known Commission meeting held with all the bosses was in November 1985, just before the death of Castellano that December. However, a Commission meeting in 1988 was led by John Gotti and attended by Vincent Gigante and new Lucchese boss Victor Amuso, the first Commission meeting since the Mafia Commission Trial. According to Salvatore Vitale, a Commission meeting was held in early 2000 to restore the rule requiring both parents to be of Italian descent in order to become a made man. The Commission is still reported to exist, though its current membership is composed of only the bosses of the Five Families and the Chicago Outfit.

Instead of a meeting of bosses, underbosses or captains meet secretly to discuss business and govern.

In October 2017, Domenico Violi of the Luppino crime family in Hamilton, Ontario was heard to have been named underboss of the Buffalo crime family on wiretaps; this revealed the activity of The Commission as Violi's promotion was so unusual, being the first Canadian to hold the second-highest position in the American Mafia, that Buffalo crime family boss Joseph Todaro Jr. stated he consulted with The Commission for permission to promote him as Buffalo's new underboss.

== Historical leadership ==
=== Chairman of the Commission ===
There was no "ruler" of the Commission, but according to Joseph Bonanno, there was a nominated Chairman or Head of the National Commission.

- 1931–1946 – Charles "Lucky" Luciano – arrested in 1936 and then deported in 1946
- 1946–1951 – Vincent "The Executioner" Mangano – disappeared in April 1951
- 1951–1957 – Ruling panel – Frank "the Prime Minister" Costello (Liberal faction), Joseph "Joe Bananas" Bonanno (Conservative faction)
- 1957–1959 – Vito "Don Vitone" Genovese – (Liberal faction along with Tommy Lucchese and Carlo Gambino); imprisoned in 1959 and died February 14, 1969
- 1959–1963 – Joseph "Joe Bananas" Bonanno (Conservative faction along with Joe Profaci and Stefano Magaddino)

=== Families with Commission seats ===
- Genovese (1931–present)
- Gambino (1931–present)
- Lucchese (1931–present)
- Chicago Outfit (1931–present)
- Bonanno (1931–1980s; 1990s–present)
- Colombo (1931–1990s; 2000s–present)

Families represented by the Genovese family

- Buffalo crime family – held a seat from 1931 to 1974
- Philadelphia crime family – held a seat from 1961 to 1980
- Detroit Partnership – held a seat from 1961 to 1977
- DeCavalcante crime family (New Jersey)
- Patriarca crime family (New England)
- Pittsburgh crime family
- Cleveland crime family
- New Orleans crime family
- Rochester crime family (defunct)
- Dallas crime family

Families represented by the Chicago Outfit

- Milwaukee crime family
- Kansas City crime family
- St. Louis crime family
- Trafficante crime family (Tampa)
- Los Angeles crime family - Held a seat from 1931 to 1956
- San Francisco crime family
- San Jose crime family

Families represented by the Bonanno family

- Rizzuto crime family

Families represented by the Colombo family

- Bufalino crime family

== Sources ==
=== Books ===
- Bernstein, Lee. The Greatest Menace: Organized Crime in Cold War America. Boston: UMass Press, 2002. ISBN 1-55849-345-X
- Bonanno, Bill. Bound by Honor: A Mafioso's Story. New York: St. Martin's Press, 1999. ISBN 0-312-97147-8
- Bonanno, Joseph. A Man of Honor: The Autobiography of Joseph Bonanno. New York: St. Martin's Press, 2003. ISBN 0-312-97923-1

=== Reports ===
- Reilly, Michael J. (March 30, 1991). 1990 Annual Report – Organized Crime in Pennsylvania: A Decade of Change (PDF) (Report). Pennsylvania Crime Commission – via Government of Pennsylvania.
