= Thomas Gioeli =

American mobster

Thomas Salvatore "Tommy Shots" Gioeli (born 1952) is a high-ranking member of the Colombo crime family.

== Rise in the Colombo family ==
In the mid-1980s, Gioeli was imprisoned for robbery, his first incarceration. After his release, Gioeli became a made member, or full member, of the Colombo family. In the late 1980s, Gioeli started working for capo Vittorio "Vic" Orena, leader of the Colombo Brooklyn faction and one of the family's top earners. Gioeli has a wife Maureen and owns a home in Farmingdale, New York. John Marzulli of New York Daily News discovered that Gioeli had a press pass from Long Island's Nightlife magazine that had been issued to him in the 1980s and expired in 1987. Nightlife magazine editor Michael Cutino explained Gioeli's press credentials as the magazine was doing a nightclub promotion in The Hamptons, and Gioeli worked for a company that provided attractive "cigarette girls" for the event.

== Colombo wars and Wiseguy reputation ==
In 1982, Gioeli allegedly participated in the accidental killing of Veronica Zuraw, a former Catholic nun. Zuraw was killed by a stray bullet during the assassination of Colombo mobster Joseph Peraino. Government witness Dino Calabro claimed that Gioeli told him he was "going to hell" for killing a nun. However, Gioeli maintains his innocence and no charges in the Zuraw killing have been filed against him.

In 1997, Gioeli allegedly participated in the murder of Ralph Dols, a New York Police Department (NYPD) officer. Colombo consigliere Joel Cacace had ordered Dols' death because Dols had recently married Cacace's ex-wife, Kim Kennaugh. Gioeli allegedly took the order from Cacace and arranged for Calabro and Colombo mobster Dino Saracino to shoot Dols outside his Brooklyn house.

In 1989, the imprisoned Colombo boss Carmine Persico appointed Orena to be his temporary acting boss. By 1991 Orena, with the encouragement of Gambino crime family boss John Gotti, felt strong enough to challenge Persico for total control of the family. In response, Persico tried to assassinate Orena in 1991. This attack triggered a bloody internal conflict in the Colombo family between the Persico and Orena factions. Gioeli gave his support to Orena. Bloody shootouts between the two factions in 1991 resulted in murders of prominent Orena supporters. As the war progressed, many Orena loyalist switched sides to the Persico faction to avoid being killed. In 1991, Gioeli switched sides and became the top lieutenant and protégée of hitman Gregory Scarpa Sr.

On June 12, 1991, Gioeli, Calabro, and soldier Joseph Competiello allegedly murdered Frank Marasa, an Orena loyalist, outside Marasa's home in Brooklyn. Gioeli allegedly murdered Marasa because he was falsely accused of being involved in the murder of another Colombo associate.

== Fall of Orena and victory ==
On March 25, 1992, Gioeli and Calabro allegedly murdered John Minerva and Micheal Imbergamo as they sat in a parked car on Long Island. Minerva was murdered because he was a Colombo soldier with the Orena faction. Imbergamo was a friend of Minerva's who was not involved in organized crime.

On March 27, 1992, Gioeli and several Persico loyalists were ambushed, and became involved in a high-speed car chase. Gioeli was wounded in the shoulder and stomach, earning him the nickname "Tommy Shots" and a reputation for toughness.

In 1992, Orena was arrested and indicted on racketeering and murder charges. In 1993, one of Orena's last remaining allies, Joseph Scopo, was killed and Orena was sentenced to life in prison. The Persico faction now claimed victory and Persico's son, Alphonse "Little Allie Boy" Persico took effective control of the family.

== Family business ==
In the late 1990s, Persico and John DeRoss promoted Gioeli to Caporegime.

On August 3, 1995, Gioeli and other mobsters allegedly murdered Colombo associate Richard Greaves in Saracino's basement apartment. Greaves had asked the Colombo leadership for permission to leave the family and move to the Midwest. However, the leaders feared that Greaves might become a government witness and ordered his killing. Gioeli allegedly buried Greaves' body in an industrial park in Farmingdale, New York.

In May 1999, Gioeli, Dino Calabro, and Dino Saracino allegedly murdered William Cutolo, the new Colombo underboss, in Saracino's apartment. Alphonse Persico had been recently convicted of a gun possession charge in Florida; he feared that Cutolo, a former Orena lieutenant, would seize control of the Colombo family. Persico ordered Cutolo to meet him in a park in Brooklyn. Gioli, Calabro, and Saracino took Cutolo to Saracino's house, where they allegedly murdered him. Gioeli then allegedly buried Cutolo in the same location in Farmingdale, New York where he allegedly buried Greaves four years earlier.

After the 2004 conviction of acting boss Cacace, Gioeli was promoted to "Street boss", with his protégé Paul Bevacqua as acting capo. Gioeli's position included meeting with Carmine Persico and conveying messages to family leaders such as Vincent and Benny Aloi, John Franzese and John DeRoss.

== Indictments ==
On June 4, 2008, Gioeli was indicted for robbery, extortion, the 1991 Marassa murder, and the 1992 Minerva and Imbergamo murders. The robbery indictment involved a 1991 fur shop robbery in which Gioeli allegedly posed as a customer. On December 16, 2008, Gioeli was indicted on the 1995 Greaves murder and the 1999 Cutolo murder. Although Alphonse Persico was convicted in 2007 of ordering Cutolo's murder, prosecutors had lacked sufficient evidence then to indict Gioeli. However, by 2008, both Calabro and Competiello were now government witnesses planning to testify against Gioeli.

On February 9, 2010, Gioeli was briefly hospitalized after suffering a minor stroke. Already diagnosed with diabetes and cardiac problems, Gioeli had unsuccessfully petitioned the court on February 8 to be released from jail due to his medical problems. Gioeli has also complained to the court about his dental problems, the poor quality of the jail food, and allegedly unsanitary practices in the dispensation of his medicine.

In July 2010, Gioeli was indicted in the 1997 Dols murder. On May 9, 2012, the jury returned a mixed verdict. Gioeli was cleared of the Cutolo and Dols murders, but convicted of racketeering conspiracy to commit murder in the Minerva and Marasa cases. On March 19, 2014, Gioeli was sentenced to 18 years and 8 months in prison and ordered to pay $360,000 in restitution.

From September 2015, Gioeli was incarcerated in the low security wing of the Federal Correctional Complex, Butner in Butner, North Carolina until he was released on May 3, 2023.
