= Aloi (disambiguation) =

Aloi is a town in Uganda.

Aloi or ALOI may also refer to:

- Aloi, Democratic Republic of the Congo, a village
- Aloi de Montbrai, a 14th-century sculptor in Catalonia
- Vincenzo Aloi (born 1933), New York mobster
- Benedetto Aloi (1935–2011), New York mobster
- Giovanni Aloi (born 1976), art historian and author
- Association of Loyal Orangewomen of Ireland, governing body of female lodges in the Orange Order
