= Lindley DeVecchio =

American FBI agent (born 1940)

- Born: Roy Lindley DeVecchio; April 18, 1940 (age 86); Fresno, California, U.S.
- Other name: Lin
- Years active: 1962–1996
- Known for: Former FBI agent who managed organized crime informants Responsible most notably for the surveillance of the Colombo crime family managed case of mobster/informant Gregory Scarpa

Roy Lindley DeVecchio (born April 18, 1940) is a former U.S. Federal Bureau of Investigation (FBI) agent in charge of managing mob informants. DeVecchio worked for the FBI during the Mafia wars in New York during the 1980s and 1990s, eventually rising to head of the FBI squad responsible for surveillance of the Colombo crime family. He was also responsible for handling Gregory Scarpa, a Colombo capo who had secretly been an FBI informant since the 1960s.

== Connection to Gregory Scarpa racketeering trial ==
After Scarpa pleaded guilty to racketeering charges in 1993, former Colombo consigliere Carmine Sessa, who had recently turned informer, tipped off prosecutors about Scarpa's unusual relationship with DeVecchio. Eventually, prosecutors uncovered circumstantial evidence that DeVecchio had leaked confidential information to Scarpa on numerous occasions. Reportedly, DeVecchio had told Scarpa about several former Colombo members who had turned informer. He was suspected of alerting Scarpa that he was being bugged, and that his son was about to be arrested for drug trafficking.

Evidence allegedly surfaced that DeVecchio had given Scarpa tips on how to track down soldiers backing Victor Orena's effort to take over the Colombo family during the Third Colombo War (1991–93); Scarpa sided with longtime boss Carmine Persico. DeVecchio is believed to be the first FBI agent accused of helping a mobster commit crimes and cover them up (although convicted, former-FBI agent John Connolly’s illicit alliance with informant and Boston mobster Whitey Bulger, proceeded DeVecchio’s culpable confederacy by approximately five years, shortly after Bulger began “informing” for the Bureau in 1975). The FBI conducted a two-year internal probe, but ultimately decided not to press charges against DeVecchio. Nonetheless, his reputation was damaged, and he retired in 1996.

Although FBI officials cleared DeVecchio of wrongdoing, 19 soldiers from the Orena faction had their convictions reversed or charges thrown out after their lawyers contended DeVecchio's actions cast doubt on the evidence against them. The lawyers contended that DeVecchio actively helped Scarpa hunt down and kill opponents, thus making many of the deaths caused by their clients acts of self-defense. They contended DeVecchio had manufactured evidence.

In 2006, Brooklyn district attorney Charles Hynes indicted DeVecchio on charges that he had helped Scarpa kill four people in the 1980s and early 1990s through supplying confidential FBI information about them. The case was based almost entirely on the testimony of Scarpa's longtime girlfriend, Linda Schiro.

However, the case imploded in the fall of 2007 when Tom Robbins of The Village Voice came forward with an interview he and mob expert Jerry Capeci had conducted with Schiro in 1997, in which Schiro denied that DeVecchio had been involved in most of the murders. Robbins and Capeci had interviewed Schiro for a book they had initially planned to write, and had promised Schiro that her revelations would not appear in a news article or be attributed to her. However, Robbins said, the prospect of DeVecchio facing life in prison trumped any promises they had made to Schiro. This forced prosecutors to move for a dismissal of charges against DeVecchio, which was granted on November 1, 2007. A retired judge was appointed special prosecutor in 2008 to examine whether Schiro had committed perjury but his report concluded that her interview tape was insufficient to prove she had perjured herself.

DeVecchio co-authored a book, published in 2011, about his experiences.

== Sources ==
- Harmon, Sandra (2009). Mafia Son. New York: St. Martin's Press. pp. 264. ISBN 978-0-312-37024-4.
