= Victor Orena =

American mobster (born 1934)

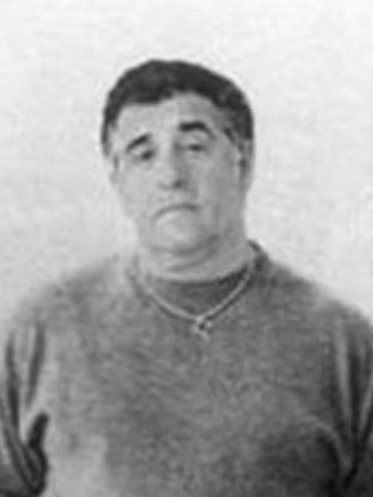
- Orena's mugshot in 1992
- Born: Victor John Orena; August 4, 1934 (age 92); New York City, New York, U.S.
- Other name: "Little Vic"
- Occupation: Crime boss
- Status: Incarcerated
- Allegiance: Colombo crime family
- Convictions: Racketeering, murder (1992)
- Penalty: Life imprisonment plus 85 years (1992)

Details
- Imprisoned at: Federal Medical Center, Devens

Victor John Orena (born August 4, 1934), also known as "Little Vic", is an American mobster who became the acting boss of the Colombo crime family of New York City. A challenge by Orena to boss Carmine Persico triggered the Third Colombo War (1991–1993), one of the bloodiest Mafia wars of the late 20th century and the most recent major mob war in New York to date, which resulted in 12 murders.

== Early life ==
Born in New York City, Orena's father died when he was a child. He spent time in a reform school and eventually dropped out of high school. According to his son, Orena entered the mob life because the wiseguys he knew had risen from humble beginnings and had become big figures in his neighborhood.

In the early 1970s, Carmine Persico, the boss of the Colombo crime family, allegedly had a few people "made" into his organization, even though the "books" had officially been closed since 1958, barring any new inductions. One of these men was Orena, who rose through the ranks and operated in Brooklyn, Long Island, and New Jersey primarily in labor racketeering. Orena was a well-dressed individual who projected a traditional business image.

== Acting boss ==
In 1985, Persico and several leading Colombo figures were convicted of racketeering charges. In 1987, Persico and underboss Gennaro Langella were each convicted in the Mafia Commission Trial and sentenced to 100 years in prison. In the separate Colombo Trial, Persico was sentenced to 39 years' imprisonment, Langella 65 years' imprisonment, and Alphonse Persico to 12 years, on November 17, 1986. To run the family in his absence, Persico named his brother, Alphonse "Allie Boy" Persico as acting boss prior to his arrest. When Alphonse skipped bail on a loansharking charge, Persico named a three-man ruling panel to run the family. In 1988, he dissolved the panel and named Orena as acting boss until his son, Alphonse "Little Allie Boy" Persico, could take over. Orena had been capo of Little Allie Boy's crew. Although Persico made it clear Orena was a placeholder, he also granted Orena the power to induct new members and order murders on his own authority, powers rarely granted to an acting boss.

When John Gotti became boss of the Gambino family in 1986, Orena was able to expand his criminal dealings with the Gambinos. He became a top earner in the Colombo family, and increased his influence with Benedetto Aloi and his brother Vincenzo, leaders of the Colombo Brooklyn faction.

In 1988, he was described as an underboss of the Colombo family and living in Cedarhurst, New York.

In November 1989, Orena allegedly ordered the murder of Colombo mobster Thomas Ocera, who allegedly skimmed mob profits, had let police seize the Colombos' loansharking records, and had supposedly killed an associate of Gotti. On November 13, Gregory Scarpa, a Colombo enforcer and FBI informant, strangled Ocera with a length of piano wire. Most believe it was because of Orena's strong stance against narcotics that Scarpa, along with fellow mobsters Carmine Sessa and John Pate, eventually turned against their boss.

In 1990, Orena was accused of conspiring to poison a racehorse named Fins, a son of the famed Seattle Slew, for insurance money as part of the larger horse murders scandal.

== Third Colombo War ==
By early 1991, Orena felt that Persico was keeping the family from making money, and that he himself should become boss. In addition, Persico had been negotiating for a television biography. Orena and several others, remembering how federal prosecutors had used Joe Bonanno's tell-all book as evidence in the Commission Trial, believed this proposed TV special would bring unwanted law enforcement interest on the family. Orena first asked the Commission to summarily remove Persico and declare him boss, but the Commission refused, saying that Orena should instead follow Mafia tradition and ask his capos if they supported him or Persico. In accordance with these instructions, Orena instructed Sessa, his consigliere, to poll his capos to see if they favored him taking over the family. Instead, Sessa alerted Persico, who ordered a hit on Orena.

On June 20, 1991, a five-man hit team including Sessa, Pate, and Hank Smurra laid in wait near Orena's Long Island home. As Orena was driving down his street, he recognized several men in the parked car. Realizing they were waiting to kill him, Orena drove away. By the time the gunmen spotted Orena, it was too late to act.

The Colombo conflict soon spiraled out of control. On November 18, 1991, Orena allegedly sent a team to murder Scarpa, who was ambushed as he was driving with his daughter and granddaughter; Scarpa and his family escaped unharmed. In retaliation, Persico loyalist Smurra, a member of the June assassination team against Orena, was shot dead later that day. On November 29, Sessa survived a murder attempt while driving his car. On December 3, Scarpa sent a team to kill Orena soldier Joseph Tollino. Tollino escaped, but his companion, Genovese family mobster Thomas Amato, was killed accidentally. On December 5 and 6, William Cutolo sent teams that killed Persico loyalists Rosario Nastasa and Vincent Fusaro. On December 8, Orena supporter Nicky Grancio was killed. Soon after, Matteo Speranza, an innocent employee of a shop owned by Persico associates, was murdered by a young Brooklyn underling Anthony Libertore and his father, who were trying to make a name for themselves with the Brooklyn faction of the Colombos. The Libertores cooperated with the FBI once imprisoned, but were not found credible.

By this time, the Colombo warfare was receiving a great deal of public attention. On December 16, 1991, the Brooklyn district attorney summoned Orena and the other Colombo principals to a grand jury meeting to testify about the conflict. The mobsters all refused to testify. As the war progressed into 1992, Orena was indicted on charges of murder and racketeering. To ensure his personal safety, he had gone into hiding at his girlfriend's new house, which was still under construction in Valley Stream, New York. On April 4, 1992, agents arrested Orena at the house. A search uncovered four shotguns, a large supply of ammunition, and a bulletproof vest. In testimony made in 1997, Gregory Scarpa Jr. would claim that his father planted the guns in the house to frame Orena. However, this charge was never proven.

== Imprisonment ==
On December 22, 1992, Orena was convicted of racketeering, the 1989 Ocera murder, and other related charges. He received three life sentences plus 85 years in federal prison. By late 1992, the shooting war had petered out and Persico remained in control of the Colombo family.

On March 10, 1997, a judge refused to overturn Orena's conviction. The appeal was based on an alleged conspiracy between Scarpa and his FBI handler, Lindley DeVecchio, against Orena during the war. On January 16, 2004, a judge denied Orena's appeal for a new trial.

As of November 2021, Orena is serving a life sentence at the Federal Medical Center (FMC) near Federal Medical Center, Devens, Massachusetts, with the register number (07540-085). While in prison, he became a Catholic Eucharistic minister, helping the priest administer the Eucharist and Precious Blood to inmates during mass. It was reported in April 2021 that Orena has dementia and is reliant on a wheelchair. A New York Times article in August 2023 reported that Orena's dementia had resulted in him imagining that he was the warden of the Devens facility.

American Mafia
Preceded by Carmine Persico	Colombo crime family De facto boss 1990–1993	Succeeded by Carmine Persico
