= William Cutolo =

American mobster (1949–1999)

- Cutolo in an undated NYPD mugshot
- Born: Guglielmo Cutolo; June 6, 1949; Potenza, Basilicata, Italy
- Disappeared: May 26, 1999 (aged 49)
- Died: May 26, 1999 (aged 49); New York City, New York, U.S.
- Body discovered: October 2008
- Resting place: Cemetery of the Resurrection
- Other names: "Billy Fingers", "Wild Bill"
- Occupation: Mobster
- Known for: Underboss of the Colombo crime family
- Predecessor: Joel Cacace
- Successor: John DeRoss
- Allegiance: Colombo crime family

William Cutolo (June 6, 1949 – May 26, 1999), also known as "Billy Fingers" and "Wild Bill", was an Italian-American mobster in the Colombo crime family of New York City who rose to the position of underboss and was heavily involved in labor racketeering. Cutolo played a key role in the Third Family War (1991–1993).

== Early life and criminal career ==
Cutolo, christened Guglielmo Cutolo, was born on June 6, 1949, in Potenza, in the Italian region of Basilicata, and was raised in the Brooklyn borough of New York City. He was the brother of Gertrude, Barbara, and Geraldine Cutolo. He had three daughters and a son, William Jr., to previous wife Margurite Butera. In 1990, Cutolo had his third daughter, Dana, with his wife Bette Anne Fox from Brooklyn. Cutolo's son followed him into illegal gambling and loansharking and was eventually convicted of extortion and racketeering.

During his life, Cutolo was involved with several charities. He was a fundraising chairman and board member for the National Leukemia Research Association in Garden City, New York. Cutolo sat on the Medical Advisory Committee as Chairman of "Team Leukemia", and was associated with the New York chapter of the Leukemia and Lymphoma Society in Rye Brook, New York. He helped raise $400,000 for International Brotherhood of Electrical Workers Local 204 as well as many other locals over the years.

In 1988, Cutolo was honored as the National Leukemia Association's Man of the Year. Cutolo paid for their holiday parties and dressed up every year as Santa Claus for the National Children's Leukemia Association in Borough Park, Brooklyn, as Cutolo's son son handed out gifts and posed for pictures with the stricken children.

During the late 1980s, Cutolo rose up the ranks of the Colombo crime family, under acting boss Victor Orena. Originally a soldier in captain Pasquale Amato's crew, Cutolo soon became one of the family's more powerful leaders. Cutolo was successful because he made much money and commanded a crew of hitmen. His crew included Joseph Petillo, Dominick Dionisio, Michael Spataro, Ralph Guccione, Vincent "Chickie" DeMartino, Michael Donato, and his son. Cutolo earned the nickname "Billy Fingers" because he was missing one finger and another one was mutilated due to an occupational accident at a hamburger store.

In 1989, Cutolo earned his nickname "Wild Bill" after beating a man with a baseball bat. Cutolo was fond of cowboy boots and frequently wore a large brown ten-gallon hat. He operated Bill's Friendly Bocce social club in the Bath Beach section of Brooklyn as his headquarters. Cutolo was the best man at mobster John "Jackie" DeRoss's wedding, the man who would eventually participate in his murder. Unyielding in negotiations and harsh with his crew members, Cutolo made no secret of his ambition to become boss of the Colombo family.

=== Labor racketeer ===
During the 1980s, Cutolo became the president and business agent for Teamsters Union local 861 in New York. In 1990, Cutolo resigned his positions the day before the Teamsters Union was planning to expel him for organized crime ties. Cutolo also gained control of District Council (DC) 37, a local of the American Federation of State, County, and Municipal Employees (AFSCME). Cutolo and his close friend mobster Thomas DiNardo used Council 37 to steer jobs to Colombo associates and spending towards Colombo-controlled vendors and resorts.

Cutolo was not afraid to use intimidation to maintain power. In 1990, Cutolo sent thugs to beat up 72-year-old Vincent Parisi, the head of a Laborers Union local with colon cancer. During a meeting several days earlier, Parisi had cursed at Cutolo and thrown a paper ball at his face. In 1998, New York City newspapers reported on links between Council 37 and the National Leukemia Research Foundation, Cutolo's favorite charity. Investigators questioned whether cash donations from union officials were actually being received by the Foundation. During the 1990s, Cutolo also became vice president of the new Local 400 of the Industrial & Production Workers Union, a city workers union. He was later accused of using the union's name to receive money from companies seeking to avoid union organizers.

=== Businessman ===
Cutolo also extorted money from companies such as Embassy Terrace, a Brooklyn caterer. The company was in severe financial trouble when it approached Cutolo for help. In return for his investment, Cutolo gained control over the enterprise. Cutolo also controlled several restaurants and nightclubs In New York and Miami, Florida. In 1998, Cutolo and mobster Vincent "Vinny Ocean" Palermo allegedly formed a partnership with German corporation Siemens AG, behind dummy investors on a cell phone deal in Russia.

=== Persico-Orena Colombo war ===
In 1991, Cutolo became enmeshed in a bloody war for control of the Colombo family. Acting boss Victor Orena had challenged Carmine Persico, still in prison, on the naming of his son Alphonse Persico as acting boss. Cutolo was one of Orena's strongest allies. On June 21, 1991, the bloodshed started with an unsuccessful assassination attempt by the Persico faction on Orena. On November 18, 1991, in response to the Orena attack, Cutolo sent a team to ambush Persico loyalist Gregory Scarpa as he was driving with his daughter and granddaughter. Scarpa and his family managed to escape harm.

Five days after the Scarpa hit, Cutolo led a hit team that killed Persico loyalist Henry Smurra outside a Brooklyn doughnut shop. In another incident, Cutolo was driving away from a Sheepshead Bay, Brooklyn social club when he spotted Persico loyalist Joel Cacace. The two men traded shots on the street, wounding Cacace. After Orena's imprisonment in 1992, the Colombo war ended in October 1993 with a Persico victory, after the murder of Orena captain Joseph Scopo.

Investigators concluded that Cutolo was personally responsible for three of the 12 murders committed during this conflict. To punish Cutolo for his support of Orena, Carmine Persico temporarily demoted him from capo to soldier. Carmine Persico was also angry that Cutolo had called him "a rat" for admitting the existence of the Cosa Nostra at the 1985 Mafia Commission Trial.

Despite his demotion, Cutolo eventually reconciled with Persico after the war, or so he thought. The family had been decimated, but the Mafia Commission would not allow the induction of new members until the two warring factions made peace. In early 1993, Cutolo and six of his crew members were arrested and held without bail on racketeering and murder charges from the Colombo war. In September 1994, they went on trial, but were all acquitted. The main reason for the verdict was just-revealed information about Scarpa's role as an informant for the Federal Bureau of Investigation (FBI).

== Murder ==
In early 1999, after Alphonse Persico was released from prison, Carmine Persico promoted Cutolo to underboss as a peace gesture. The situation changed when Alphonse Persico was sentenced to prison in Florida on a gun possession charge. The Persicos and DeRoss were afraid that Cutolo would seize control of the family in Alphonse Persico's absence and decided to murder Cutolo.

On May 26, 1999, Alphonse Persico summoned Cutolo to a meeting. Cutolo's mechanic dropped him off at a park in Bay Ridge, Brooklyn where the meeting was set to take place. After Cutolo arrived at the park, Thomas Gioeli, Dino Saracino, and Dino Calabro allegedly transported Cutolo to the basement of Saracino's house, where they murdered him. Gioeli then allegedly buried Cutolo at an industrial park in Farmingdale, New York. A few years later, Gambino crime family captain Michael "Mikey Scars" DiLeonardo testified that when he arrived at this meeting, Alphonse Persico and DeRoss told him that Cutolo was gone.

The day after the Cutolo murder, DeRoss unsuccessfully ransacked Cutolo's home office in Staten Island for Cutolo's loansharking records and a $1.5 million cash stash, hidden in a stove vent. During that visit and succeeding ones, DeRoss warned Cutolo's family not to make any statements to police that linked Persico or the Colombo family to the shooting. DeRoss became the new underboss. In 2001, Cutolo's family formally joined the Witness Protection Program. In 2006, Cutolo's son was removed from the program due to an extortion conviction. In a 2002 hearing in Surrogate Court, a judge pronounced Cutolo dead in absentia.

=== Trials ===
In 2004, Alphonse Persico and DeRoss were indicted for conspiring to murder Cutolo. On November 4, 2004, the first trial ended as a mistrial because the jury deadlocked over a case with just circumstantial evidence and no body. On November 7, 2007, the second trial began. On December 28, 2007, Persico and DeRoss were convicted of Cutolo's murder. The evidence in the second trial now included undercover recordings of Persico and DeRoss made by Cutolo's son for the FBI, as well as crucial testimony by Cutolo's wife Peggy.

In December 2008, Gioeli, Saracino, and Calabro were also indicted in the Cutolo murder. On February 27, 2009, Persico and DeRoss were sentenced to life imprisonment for the Cutolo murder. In February 2010, Dino Calabro became a government witness. It was likely that he would testify against Gioeli and Saracino in the Cutolo murder trial.

=== Recovery of body ===
In October 2008, acting on an informant's information, federal agents started searching a field in East Farmingdale, New York. They soon unearthed the body of a man wrapped in a blue tarpaulin; the man was wearing Italian loafers. A forensic dentist later confirmed that the body was that of Cutolo. In 2008, nine years after his murder, Cutolo was interred at the Cemetery of the Resurrection, Staten Island.

== See also ==
- List of solved missing person cases: 1990s
