= Andrew Russo =

Andrew Russo may refer to:

- Andrew Russo (crime boss) (1932–2022), American mob boss
- Andrew Russo (pianist) (born 1975), American pianist
