= Joel Cacace =

American mobster and former consigliere

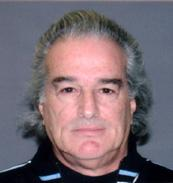
- Federal Bureau of Investigation 2007 federal prison mugshot of Cacace in Florence, Colorado
- Born: April 9, 1941 (age 85)
- Other name: Joe Waverly
- Occupation: Mobster
- Children: 1
- Allegiance: Colombo crime family
- Conviction: Murder (2004)
- Penalty: 20 years' imprisonment

Joel Cacace Sr. (born April 9, 1941), also known as Joe Waverly, is an American mobster and former consigliere of the Colombo crime family in New York City. He was convicted of murder in 2004 and was released from prison in 2020. Since his release, he has been the alleged underboss of the family.

== Early life ==
Cacace had one child, Joel "JoJo" Cacace Jr., with his wife Vita Rose Cacace. JoJo was reportedly a member of the Colombo family and was allegedly involved in labor racketeering before his death from a heart attack on January 1, 2015, at the age of 44.

Cacace is close friends with Colombo capo Luca DeMatteo and former acting boss Victor Orena. Cacace was involved in extortion, illegal gambling, and the hijacking and selling of truckloads of cigarettes.

== Criminal career ==
On December 20, 1976, Joel Cacace Sr. was ambushed by three robbers near his florist shop in Sheepshead Bay, Brooklyn. After being shot in the chest, Cacace wrestled a handgun from one of the robbers, and shot and killed an assailant. The remaining robbers fled the scene. The critically wounded Cacace drove to a local police station with the robber's body in the backseat.

In early 1987, imprisoned Colombo boss Carmine Persico ordered Cacace to kill federal prosecutors William Aronwald and Rudy Giuliani. Persico believed that Aronwald, who had helped prosecute Persico, had been disrespectful to the Cosa Nostra. Killing a prosecutor was normally forbidden in Cosa Nostra tradition, but Persico wanted him murdered anyway. Cacace arranged for brothers Vincent and Eddie Carnini to murder Aronwald. Cacace gave the two hit men a piece of paper with the name Aronwald on it. However, Aronwald's father, George Aronwald, was an administrative law judge and shared his son's office; the gunmen thought he was the target. On March 20, 1987, the Carninis shot and killed George Aronwald Senior in a laundromat near his home.

Furious at the Aronwald murder, the heads of the other New York "Five Families" demanded that the Colombos kill the Carnini brothers. An enraged Cacace recruited Lucchese crime family member Carmine Variale and Bonanno crime family associate Frank Santora to eliminate the Carninis. In June 1987, both Carnini brothers were found dead in the back seats of their cars in Brooklyn. Concerned about the loyalty of his assassins, Cacace decided to murder them also. At the Carninis' funeral, Cacace allegedly pointed out Variale and Santora to a second pair of hitmen. In September 1987, Variale and Santora were murdered outside a Brooklyn social club in broad daylight. This extraordinary caution helped to temporarily conceal Cacace's involvement in the Aronwald murder.

Also in 1987, Cacace was involved in the unrelated murder of former New York Police Department (NYPD) officer Carlo Antonino.

Despite the Aronwald fiasco, Cacace's brutal reputation gained him a large following among his men. One family member supposedly commented,

With Joe dealing the cards, you never know where the next card is coming from - the top or the bottom or the middle of the deck.

Following the Carnini murders, Eddie Carnini's widow, Kim T. Kennaugh, moved in with Cacace and later married him. They soon separated and Kim divorced him.

In January 1991, during the 1990s Colombo War, Cacace attempted to kill Gregory Scarpa, a hitman aligned with the Persico faction. Cacace was a supporter of temporary acting boss Victor Orena, who was challenging Carmine Persico for control of the family. Cacace drove up next to Scarpa's car in Sheepshead Bay and fired at him several times. Scarpa escaped unharmed. On February 26, 1992, the two mobsters shot at each other again outside a social club in the same neighborhood. Two gunmen in a parked station wagon fired 14 shots at Cacace as he was visiting his dry cleaner. Although wounded in the stomach, Cacace drew a handgun and exchanged shots with the men. Colombo enforcer Greg Scarpa later boasted about participating in the Cacace murder attempt. As the Colombo War progressed, Cacace switched sides to the Persico faction, which ultimately won.

=== Murder conviction ===
On January 23, 2003, Cacace was indicted for the murders of Antonino, Aronwald, Variale, and Santora. On August 13, 2004, Cacace pleaded guilty to charges of extortion, illegal gambling and the four murders. On September 8, 2004, Cacace was sentenced to 20 years in prison. He was imprisoned at the ADX Florence in Florence, Colorado, and was later transferred to the United States Penitentiary, Beaumont in Beaumont, Texas.

On December 18, 2008, Cacace was charged with ordering the 1997 murder of New York Police Department officer Ralph Dols. According to the indictment, Cacace felt humiliated that Dols, a Latino, had recently married Cacace's ex-wife Kim. Cacace allegedly ordered Colombo capo Dino Calabro and soldier Dino Saracino to murder Dols. On August 25, 1997, Calabro and Saracino allegedly ambushed Dols outside his Brooklyn home and killed him.

On November 26, 2013, a jury acquitted Cacace on the Dols murder charge. Cacace was imprisoned at the Tucson Federal Correctional Institution in Tucson, Arizona, and was later transferred to the low security FCI Ashland in Kentucky. Cacace was released from prison on May 22, 2020.

Since his release, Cacace is the alleged underboss of the family.

American Mafia
Preceded by Alphonse Persico	Colombo crime family Acting boss 2000–2004	Succeeded by Carmine Persico
