= Gennaro Langella =

American mobster

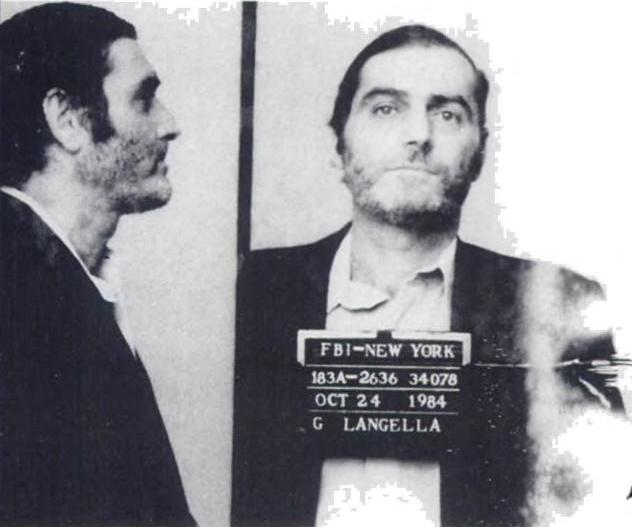
- FBI mugshot, October 24, 1984
- Born: December 30, 1938; New York City, U.S.
- Died: December 15, 2013 (aged 74); Springfield, Missouri, U.S.
- Other names: "Gerry Lang", "Jerry Lang"
- Children: 1
- Allegiance: Colombo crime family
- Criminal charges: Perjury, obstruction of justice (1985); Racketeering (1986); Racketeering (1986)
- Penalty: 10 years' imprisonment and fined $15,000 (1985); 65 years' imprisonment (1986); 100 years' imprisonment and fined $240,000 (1987)

Gennaro Adriano Langella (Italian pronunciation: [dʒenˈnaːro adriˈaːno lanˈdʒɛlla]; December 30, 1938 – December 15, 2013), also known as "Gerry Lang", was an American mobster in the Colombo crime family of New York City, and eventually became underboss and acting boss.

== Biography ==
=== Background ===
Langella was born in Brooklyn, New York City, in 1938 to first generation immigrants from Campania, Italy. Langella became a close associate of future mob boss Carmine Persico. It is believed that Langella secretly became a "made man" in the Colombo family during a time when the New York crime families were not accepting new members. Langella is the father of reputed Colombo soldier Vincent Langella. Crime writer Selwyn Raab described Langella as:

... a ruthless, arrogant loan shark and drug trafficker. His speech was peppered with expletives. He was considered a vain clotheshorse and unlike more contemporary Hollywood gangster attire, he favored double-breasted blazers, sporty open-collar shirts and wrap-around sunglasses. He was a regular patron of the Casa Sorta restaurant in Bensonhurst, Brooklyn, where he would hold meetings with associates.

=== Colombo family ===
Langella quickly rose up through the ranks of the crime family. While Persico was in prison during the late 1970s and early 1980s, Langella doubled as underboss and even as acting boss while Persico went into hiding to avoid federal indictments. Langella supervised various labor rackets for the family, including their stake in the "Concrete Club", and exerted control over various labor unions, including Cement and Concrete Workers District Council, Local 6A. As acting boss, his consigliere was Ralph Scopo Jr., the son of Colombo crime family soldier Ralph Scopo Sr.

=== Prison ===
On October 14, 1984, Langella, Persico, and other Colombo mobsters were indicted on RICO racketeering and extortion charges in the Colombo trial. On February 25, 1985, Langella and other mob leaders were indicted in the Mafia Commission Trial.

In March 1985, Langella was sentenced to 10 years' imprisonment and a $15,000 fine for perjury and obstruction of justice. In the Colombo Trial, Langella was sentenced to 65 years' imprisonment on November 17, 1986. Along with the other defendants, Langella pleaded not guilty on July 1, 1985, in the Mafia Commission Trial. On November 19, 1986, Langella was convicted in the Mafia Commission Trial along with Persico and other top Cosa Nostra leaders in New York. On January 13, 1987, Langella was sentenced to 100 years in prison to run consecutively with his 65-year sentence, fined $240,000, and given no option for parole.

He was last imprisoned in the United States Medical Center for Federal Prisoners (MCFP) in Springfield, Missouri, where he died on December 15, 2013.
