= Mafia Commission =

Mafia Commission may refer to:

- Sicilian Mafia Commission
- The Commission (American Mafia)
- Mafia Commission Trial
