= Mobsters (TV series) =

- Country of origin: United States

Production
- Running time: 60 minutes

Original release
- Network: The Biography Channel
- Release: April 3, 2007 – September 3, 2012

Mobsters is an American documentary television series which aired on The Biography Channel. It profiles the lives of criminals, often deceased, from the point of view of their former associates or pursuers.

Some episodes of Mobsters are rehashes of the similar TV series American Justice as well as Notorious, both series that were originally broadcast on Biography Channel's sister channel, A&E Network; some episodes also rehashed segments from another A&E series American Gangster, which began airing on the Black Entertainment Television (BET) channel. The only differences are the intro of the episodes and the lead-in's after commercials. Besides this, the rehashed episodes are no different in any way. It's narrated by John Lurie.

== Episode list ==
=== Season 1 ===
1. Bugsy Siegel Episode #1.1 aired 4/3/2007
2. Sammy "the Bull" Gravano Episode #1.2 aired 4/10/2007
3. Jimmy Hoffa Episode #1.3 aired 4/17/2007
4. Joseph "The Rat" Valachi Episode #1.5 aired 8/13/2007
5. Frank Costello Episode #1.6 aired 5/8/2007
6. Vinnie "The Chin" Gigante Episode #1.7 aired 5/15/2007
7. Meyer Lansky Episode #1.8 aired 5/22/2007
8. Lucky Luciano Episode #1.9 aired 5/29/2007
9. Jack Ruby Episode #1.10 aired 6/5/2007
10. Joe Bonnano Episode #1.11 aired 6/12/2007
11. Al Capone Episode #1.12 aired 6/19/2007
12. Sam Giancana Episode #1.13 aired 6/26/2007
13. Louis Lepke Episode #1.14 aired 7/3/2007
14. Henry Hill Episode #1.16 aired 11/4/2007
15. James Bulger Episode #1.17 aired 6/14/2007
16. Murder, Inc. Episode #1.18 aired 6/21/2007
17. Tommy Lucchese Episode #1.19 aired 6/28/2007
18. Paul Castellano Episode #1.20 aired 7/12/2007
19. John Gotti Episode #1.21 aired 7/19/2007
20. Carlos Marcello Episode #1.22 aired 7/26/2007
21. Frank Lucas Episode #1.23 aired 10/3/2007
22. Santo Trifficante Episode #1.24 aired 10/10/2007
23. Mickey Cohen Episode #1.25 aired 10/17/2007
24. Roy DeMeo Episode #1.26 aired 10/24/2007
25. Joey Lombardo Episode #1.27 aired 12/5/2007
26. Tony Spilotro Episode #1.28 aired 12/5/2007
27. Mob Ladies Episode #1.29 aired 12/12/2007
28. Nicky Scarfo Episode #1.30 aired 12/19/2007

=== Season 2 ===
1. Joey Gallo Episode #2.1 aired 12/4/2009
2. Frank Nitti Episode #2.2 aired 12/18/2009
3. The Westies Episode #2.3 aired 12/11/2009
4. Nicky Barnes Episode #2.4 aired 12/16/2009
5. Tony Accardo Episode #2.5 aired 12/19/2011
6. The Mob's Greatest Hits Episode #2.6 aired 1/15/2010

=== Season 3 ===
1. Mafia Cops: Louis Eppolito and Stephen Caracappa Episode #3.1 aired 12/3/2010
2. Danny Greene Episode #3.2 aired 12/10/2010
3. Albert Anastasia Episode #3.3 aired 12/17/2010
4. Tommy "Karate" Pitera Episode #3.4 aired 12/25/2010
5. Anthony "Gaspipe" Casso Episode #3.5 aired 1/1/2011
6. "Big Joey" Massino Episode #3.6 aired 1/21/2011

=== Season 4 ===
1. "Mad Dog" Sullivan Episode #4.1 aired 7/13/2012
2. Family Secrets Episode #4.2 aired 7/20/2012
3. "Mad Sam" DeStefano Episode #4.3 aired 7/27/2012
4. "The Iceman" Richard Kuklinski Episode #4.5 aired 8/2012
5. Carmine Persico Episode #4.6 aired 8/21/2012
6. Greg "The Grim Reaper" Scarpa Episode #4.7 aired 8/28/2012
7. Jimmy "The Gent" Burke Episode #4.8 aired 9/4/2012
