= Vincenzo Aloi =

American mobster (born 1933–2025)

- Born: September 22, 1933; New York City, New York, U.S.
- Died: July 14, 2025 (aged 91); Florida, U.S.
- Other name: "Vinny"
- Occupation: Mobster
- Relatives: Benedetto Aloi (brother)
- Allegiance: Colombo crime family
- Conviction: Stock fraud (1973)
- Penalty: 9 years' imprisonment (1974)

Vincenzo Aloi (born September 22, 1933 – July 14, 2025) was an American mobster involved in stock fraud, gambling, and garment industry rackets who briefly served as the acting boss, and later consigliere, of the Colombo crime family of New York City. Vincenzo was also a figure in the Third Colombo War alongside his brother Benny.

== Criminal career ==
Vincenzo Aloi was the son of the former Profaci caporegime, Sebastian "Buster" Aloi. He was the brother of mobster Benedetto "Benny" Aloi, a former underboss of the family. Vincent Aloi is the godson of Gambino crime family patriarch, Carlo Gambino. Vincenzo took over much of his father's gambling operations, starting in 1963.

Like his father Aloi also owned several garment industry trucking companies, including City Carriers, which transported garments from manufacturers to retailers. Aloi also reputedly was connected to the Greater Blouse, Skirt and Undergarment Association, a garment industry trade group then allegedly controlled by Joseph Gallo of the Gambino crime family.

Aloi was also at times an employee of Cameo Wedding Time, which specialized in services for elaborate weddings. Aloi's nominal job was to identify those couples who would be in need of Cameo's services.

On June 28, 1971, boss Joseph Colombo was shot at an Italian American Anti-Defamation League rally at Columbus Circle. Colombo survived, but in a vegetative state. Carmine Persico and his family essentially took control of the family after the Colombo shooting. However, unlike Colombo, Persico preferred to hide behind figurehead bosses. At this point, Persico designated either Aloi or mobster Joseph Yacovelli as the front boss for the Colombo family.

In 1972 Yacovelli fled New York, after having given his men permission to gun down renegade mobster Joseph "Crazy Joe" Gallo at Umberto's Clam House in Manhattan's Little Italy, out of fear of reprisals from the Gallo crew. Later in 1973, Aloi became acting boss when Persico was sentenced to ten years in federal prison on hijacking charges.

== Prosecution and Imprisonment ==
On November 19, 1970, Aloi was indicted on stock fraud charges involving the illegal takeover of an investment firm in Miami, Florida. However, on December 23, 1971, Aloi was acquitted on all charges.

On June 26, 1973, Aloi was convicted of perjury in state court. Prosecutors had charged that Aloi lied to a grand jury when he claimed to have not visited a Colombo family safe house in Nyack, New York before the murder of Joe Gallo. He was later sentenced to two and one-third to seven years in state prison.

While Aloi was appealing his state court perjury conviction he was also serving a prison sentence on federal charges for stock fraud involving an automobile leasing company. After being convicted on those federal charges later in 1973 Aloi was sentenced to nine years in Allenwood Federal Penitentiary in 1974. Now that Aloi was also in prison, Persico demoted him from acting boss back to capo.

After numerous state court appeals and habeas corpus proceedings, a federal district court set aside Aloi's perjury conviction on a writ of habeas corpus. The Second Circuit Court of Appeals first affirmed the District Court's decision in 1979, then reversed it in 1980, after the Supreme Court remanded Aloi's case to it for reconideration.

While Aloi's challenge to his state court conviction was proceeding, his federal sentence for fraud was commuted in 1979 to time served. In 1985 Aloi was released from prison, returning to his crew in the Brooklyn faction of the Colombo crime family.

== Later years ==
In 1991, Aloi sided with Colombo underboss Victor Orena in his bloody rebellion against the imprisoned Persico. There is no evidence, however, that Aloi had a direct role in the conflict, and Persico allowed him to remain as caporegime when the Third Colombo War ended in 1993. Later in the decade, Persico appointed Aloi and his brother Benedetto as acting consiglieri.

During the mid-1990s, Gambino crime family capo Nicholas "Little Nick" Corozzo became involved in a dispute over the DeCavalcante crime family of New Jersey inducting Manhattan residents. A meeting was called to resolve the problem and Aloi attended it as the Colombo representative. It was decided in the meeting that the DeCavalcante crime family could no longer induct associates outside of New Jersey and South Philadelphia.

== Death ==
Aloi retired to Florida in 2008. He died on July 14, 2025, aged 91.

American Mafia
Preceded by Joseph Colombo	Colombo crime family Acting Boss; 1971-1973	Succeeded by Carmine Persico

American Mafia
Preceded by Carmine Sessa	Colombo crime family Consigliere; 1993-1999	Succeeded by Joel Cacace
