= Gioeli =

Gioeli is a surname of Italian origin. Notable people with the surname include:

- Johnny Gioeli (born 1967), American singer, songwriter and composer
- Thomas Gioeli (born 1952), American mobster
