= Andrew Russo (crime boss) =

American crime family boss (1934–2022)

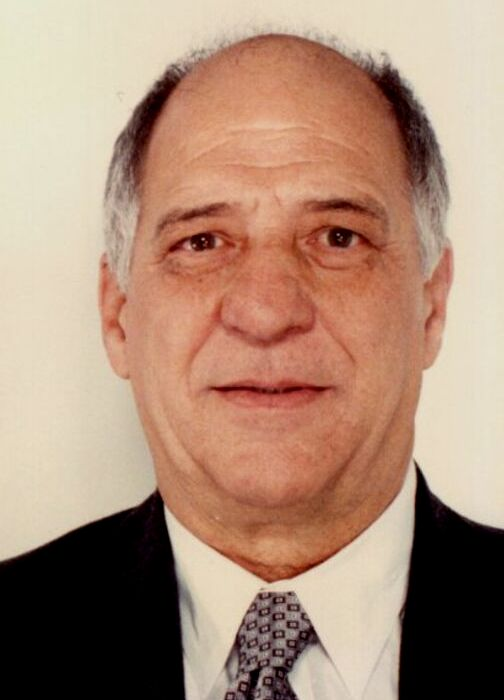
- Russo in his 1996 mugshot
- Born: August 9, 1934; New York City, New York, U.S.
- Died: April 18, 2022 (aged 87); New York City, New York, U.S.
- Other name: Andy Mush
- Occupation: Crime boss
- Years active: 1950s–2022
- Organization: Colombo crime family
- Predecessor: Carmine Persico
- Successor: Theodore N. "Skinny Teddy" Persico Jr.
- Criminal charges: Racketeering, Jury tampering

Andrew Russo (August 9, 1934 — April 18, 2022), sometimes known as Andy Mush, was an American mobster who served as the official Colombo crime family boss from 2019 to 2022, succeeding Carmine “The Snake” Persico as boss after his death in prison.

== Criminal history ==
Russo was acting boss of the Colombo crime family from 1994 to 1996, when he was imprisoned.

Russo was convicted of jury tampering in 1999. The matter involved his attempt to contact a juror involved in the criminal trial of his son, Joseph. He was previously romantically involved with an attorney who subsequently left him and testified to the attempted contact. In 2012, Russo pled guilty to federal racketeering charges related to his involvement in illegal gambling.

Russo succeeded Alphonse Persico as boss of the Colombo crime family in 2019. According to a former FBI special agent interviewed by the Wall Street Journal, Russo mismanaged the organization by micromanaging subordinates and trying to hold onto leadership past his prime.

In September 2021, the United States Department of Justice indicted Russo on multiple racketeering charges related to an alleged scheme to infiltrate a labor union. He was released the following month on a $10 million bond and died in 2022, before trial.
