= Ralph Scopo =

American mobster (1928–1993)

Ralph "Little Ralphie" Scopo Sr. (November 21, 1928 – March 9, 1993) was a New York mobster with the Colombo crime family who became a powerful labor racketeer. He was the father of Colombo mobsters Joseph Scopo and Ralph Scopo Jr., and the grandfather of Joseph Scopo Jr. and Ralph Scopo III.

== Concrete Club ==
Scopo was the president of the Cement and Concrete Workers District Council of the Laborers' International Union of North America from 1977 to April 1985. During this time, Scopo used his position to extort money from cement contractors in New York in return for large construction contracts and labor peace. Contracts between $2 million and $15 million were reserved for a club of contractors called the "Concrete Club", which were selected by The Commission. In return, the contractors gave a two percent kickback of the contract value to The Commission. Although Scopo was only a low-ranking soldier, his membership in the Concrete Club allowed him more influence than some capos in the Colombo family.

In a recorded conversation with a non-club contractor, Scopo was heard explaining:

Scopo: ... The concrete's gotta be twelve million?
Contractor: Yeah. Why can't I do the concrete?
Scopo: You can't do it. Over two million you can't do it. It's under two million, hey, me, I tell you go ahead and do it.
Contractor: Who do I gotta go see? Tell me who I gotta go see?
Scopo: You gotta see every Family. And they're gonna tell you, "no." So don't even bother.
Contractor: And if Tommy goes and talks to them?
Scopo: They'll tell you no. No matter who talks. I know they'll tell you no. I went through this not once, a hundred times. I can't get it for myself. How could I get it for somebody else?

The Cosa Nostra's control over the cement companies was backed up by violence. In a recorded conversation with contractor James Costigan, Scopo explained how the Concrete Club "protected" contractors:

Scopo: If I tell you stories about Contractors that you know, that's supposed to get hurt, that I protected ...
Costigan: Why would any, they get hurt?
Scopo: Well, we ... for doin' what they're not supposed to be doin'.

In another recording in April 1984, Scopo tells an associate that the Gambino crime family had murdered capo Roy DeMeo because they feared DeMeo might become a government witness and testify against them.

== Racketeering convictions ==
In 1980, the FBI initiated Operation Genus against all five of the New York Cosa Nostra families, an effort that would result in the infamous Mafia Commission trial. As part of this investigation, agents placed a remote listening device in Scopo's car.

On February 25, 1985, Scopo and other high-ranking Cosa Nostra leaders were indicted on federal racketeering charges. Scopo was specifically charged with extorting $326,000 from a concrete supplier. As a result of the indictment, Scopo was forced to resign from the District Council. Along with the other defendants, Scopo pleaded not guilty on July 1, 1985, in what would become known as the Mafia Commission Trial. On November 14, 1985, the trial was interrupted when Scopo complained of chest pains and was transported to a local hospital. However, he was able to return to the trial the next day.

== Prison ==
On November 19, 1986, Scopo was convicted in the Commission Trial of racketeering for carrying out the orders of the Mafia Commission. On January 13, 1987, Scopo was sentenced to 100 years in prison without an option for parole and fined $240,000. Two months later, on March 21, 1987, the remaining leadership of the Concrete Workers District Council resigned, to be replaced by a court-appointed trustee. After Scopo's conviction, his son Joseph became the new capo for his father's crew and later family underboss.

On July 17, 1987, Scopo was convicted of federal extortion charges in connection with the Colombo Trial (which was separate from the Commission Trial).

On March 9, 1993, Ralph Scopo Sr. died of natural causes while serving his sentence at United States Penitentiary, Lewisburg. On October 20, 1993, his son Joseph Scopo was murdered by loyalists of Colombo boss Carmine Persico.
