= Alphonse Persico =

American mobster

- Born: Alphonse Persico; February 8, 1954 (age 72); New York City, U.S.
- Other names: Little Allie Boy, Allie Boy
- Occupation: Crime boss
- Spouse: Teresa Persico
- Parent: Carmine Persico
- Allegiance: Colombo crime family
- Convictions: Racketeering (1986); Murder, racketeering, witness tampering (2007)
- Penalty: 12 years' imprisonment (1986); Life imprisonment (2009)

Alphonse T. Persico, known as Little Allie Boy or just Allie Boy (born February 8, 1954), is an American mobster who served as the official acting boss of the Colombo crime family from 1996 to 2019; he is the son of crime boss Carmine Persico.

== Background ==
Alphonse T. Persico was born on February 8, 1954, in New York City. As a young child he grew up in South Brooklyn and Bensonhurst.

Persico's father was Carmine Persico, a former boss of the Colombo family. Alphonse Persico has two brothers, Lawrence and Michael Persico. He was nicknamed "Little Allie Boy" to distinguish him from his father's older brother, who was also named Alphonse and was a caporegime (captain) in the Colombo family; he died in 1989. Alphonse Persico was married to Teresa Persico.

Unlike some mafiosi, the young Alphonse Persico was a promising student who graduated from high school and was accepted into college at St. John's University School of Law. Instead, he quit St. John's after his sophomore year, presumably to work for his father. By his early 20s, Persico was a soldier in his father's family, and by his mid-20s, Persico was reportedly a capo. Like many other mafiosi, Persico enjoyed the power and excitement of the mob life. In 1983, Persico was arrested for heroin possession, but the case was dismissed.

== Orena rebellion ==
In 1987, Carmine Persico was sentenced to a combined 139 years in prison after being convicted in two separate trials—the Mafia Commission Trial and a separate racketeering trial involving the Colombo family's operations. Persico had named his brother, Alphonse, as acting boss previous to his arrest. Little Allie Boy was also convicted in the "Colombo Trial", and sentenced to 12 years in federal prison, on November 17, 1986. The sentencing judge, John F. Keenan, urged Little Allie Boy to renounce his life of crime, pointing out that he would still be fairly young once he got out of prison. "You are a chump if you stay in the Colombo family," Keenan said.

Knowing that he would likely die in prison, Persico still wanted to ensure that his share of the Colombo rackets flowed to his relatives. He intended for Little Allie Boy to become acting boss as soon as his nephew was out of prison. To that end, Carmine Persico selected Victor Orena, the capo of his son's former crew, to be the temporary acting boss. In selecting Orena, Persico made it clear to the family that he was merely a placeholder until Alphonse was released.

In the spring of 1991, Orena decided to depose the Persicos and become boss in his own right. He told consigliere Carmine Sessa to call a referendum of the family capos to approve his takeover. Instead, Sessa alerted the imprisoned Carmine Persico, who promptly ordered Orena's murder. On June 20, 1991, Persico gunmen made an unsuccessful attempt to kill Orena at his home. In November 1991, after several months of negotiations, the Persico and Orena factions broke into open warfare. Still in prison, Alphonse Persico directed the campaign against Orena. On May 13, 1993, Alphonse and other family leaders were indicted on racketeering charges that included the 1992 murders of Orena loyalists John Minerva and Michael Imbergamo. By October 1993, Orena and many of his followers had been sent to prison. Carmine Persico retained control of the Colombo family. Also in 1993, Teresa Persico divorced Alphonse.

On August 8, 1994, Alphonse Persico was acquitted of the 1993 federal racketeering and murder charges due to the revelations about Colombo capo Gregory Scarpa and his relationship with the FBI. Persico was now a free man, but he did not become acting boss right away. Instead, Persico spent much of the next few years at his family home in Ft. Lauderdale, Florida. In 1994, Carmine Persico appointed Andrew Russo as acting boss. When Russo went to prison in 1996, Alphonse Persico took over as acting boss.

== Cutolo murder ==
Alphonse Persico's second stint as acting boss would last only a year before he was sent back to prison. In early 1999, the US Coast Guard stopped Persico in his speedboat as he was motoring in the Florida Keys. After searching the vessel, Coast Guardsmen arrested Persico for possessing a shotgun and a semiautomatic handgun as a felon.

In May 1999, Carmine or Alphonse Persico allegedly ordered the murder of his newly appointed underboss, William Cutolo. Persico's motive might have been revenge for Cutolo's support of Orena in 1991. However, another theory is that since Alphonse Persico was facing prison again for the Florida weapons charge, Persico feared that Cutolo would seize control of the family during his absence. On May 26, 1999, Cutolo's wife, Marguerite Cutolo, reported her husband missing. Earlier that day, Alphonse Persico had summoned Cutolo to a park in the Bay Ridge section of Brooklyn. However, when Cutolo arrived at the park, Colombo hitmen Thomas Gioeli, Dino Calabro, and Dino Saracino allegedly took Cutolo to Saracino's apartment, where they murdered him. Gioeli later buried Cutolo's body in a field in Farmingdale, New York, where it remained undiscovered until October 2008.

In October 1999, Persico was arrested again in New York on federal racketeering, loan sharking and bank fraud charges. The arresting agents searched Persico's Brooklyn apartment and uncovered $25,000 in cash along with records of extensive loan sharking and credit card fraud activities. He was released on bail. Assistant U.S Attorney Jim Walden, deputy chief of the Brooklyn Organized Crime section, prosecuted Persico. In 2000, Persico was convicted on the Florida gun charges and sent to federal prison in Florida for 18 months.

== Prison ==
On January 24, 2001, Persico finished his weapons sentence and was due for release from prison in Florida. However, that same day, Persico was transported back to New York, where prosecutors indicted him on loansharking charges.

The government also suspected Persico in the Cutolo murder and was starting to build a case against him. Persico was held without bail. On December 20, 2001, Persico pleaded guilty to federal racketeering, loan-sharking and money-laundering charges from 1999 and 2001. As part of the plea, Persico was forced to publicly acknowledge his role as acting boss of the Colombo family. The judge sentenced Persico to 13 years in federal prison.

On October 14, 2004, Persico was finally indicted in New York for the Cutolo murder. However, on November 3, 2006, the judge declared a mistrial due to allegations that Cutolo's wife Marguerite had lied under oath. In the second trial, on December 28, 2007, Persico and underling John "Jackie" DeRoss were convicted of murder in aid of racketeering and witness tampering. On February 27, 2009, Persico was sentenced to life in prison without parole for the Cutolo murder.

== Aftermath ==
In February 2010, Colombo hitman Frank Sparaco reportedly told prosecutors that Persico had ordered the 1992 murder of Michael Devine, a Staten Island nightclub owner. Devine, who was found shot to death in a car, had allegedly enraged Persico by dating Persico's wife Teresa during their separation. No charges have been filed.

In September 2015, Persico was serving his life sentence at the United States Penitentiary, Coleman near Coleman, Florida, and in July 2017, he was transferred to the Federal Correctional Institution, McKean.
