= John DeRoss =

American Mafia underboss (born 1937)

John J. DeRoss
- Born: July 17, 1937 (age 89); Brooklyn, New York, U.S.
- Other name: Jackie Zambooka
- Occupation: Mobster
- Allegiance: Colombo crime family
- Convictions: Racketeering (1984: 12 years; 2002; 2004: 4 years); Murder (2007: life)

Details
- Imprisoned at: USP McCreary

John J. DeRoss (born July 17, 1937), also known as Jackie or Jackie Zambooka, is a former underboss in the Colombo crime family.

== Capo and control over local 100 ==
John DeRoss is the father of Colombo family mobsters Jack J. DeRoss and Jamie T. DeRoss. He is an uncle to Carmine "Skippy" DeRoss and to Alphonse Persico, which would make him a brother-in-law to Carmine Persico.

After the 1971 assassination attempt on boss Joseph "Joe" Colombo, capo Carmine Persico became boss and promoted DeRoss to caporegime. Throughout the 1970s, DeRoss developed racketeering, loansharking, money laundering, extortion, and narcotics operations. In 1983, Local 100 of the Hotel and Restaurant Employees International Union was established in New York. Soon after this, the Colombo family used its influence to elect DeRoss as Local president. DeRoss used his position for the next 15 years to extort money from businesses that dealt with the local.

Toward the mid 1980s, US authorities recognized DeRoss as acting underboss for Carmine Persico, as many Colombo family members went on trial and were imprisoned. In October 1984, DeRoss and Carmine Persico were indicted on racketeering charges involving several restaurants and construction companies. DeRoss was convicted and sentenced to 12 years.

=== Release and underboss ===
Toward his release in the mid 1990s, the Colombo family entered a huge battle for the power of leadership in the family. The acting boss Victor Orena demanded complete power over the family from Carmine Persico, and the two factions went to war during the early 1990s. The Persico faction claimed victory in 1993, and with half the family on trial, DeRoss was released in the late 1990s, just as he was arrested and prosecuted again for racketeering and loansharking charges but acquitted due to lack of evidence. However, his former union cooperator, Chickie Amodeo, had been banned from all contact with union officials and imprisoned again in 1994. Upon DeRoss' release, many Colombo members were imprisoned and demoted by Persico, as they chose to support Orena in his failed attempt to overthrow Persico. In 1990, DeRoss was promoted to the rank of underboss in the Colombo crime family and chosen as the top aide by Persico's son and then current family acting boss, Alphonse Persico, in 1999.

=== Alphonse Persico's revenge ===
After Alphonse Persico became acting boss in 1999, he took revenge on many Orena supporters who had opposed his father Carmine. One of these supporters was William "Wild Bill" Cutolo. Persico and DeRoss summoned Cutolo to a meeting, after which he was never seen again. DeRoss told Cutolo's wife that her husband might have left for Italy.

Later in 1999, DeRoss and Persico ordered the murder of Joseph "Joe Campy" Campanella, a Cutolo crew member. Several Persico loyalists ambushed and shot Campanella, but he survived and later became a government informant.

=== Indictments and exclusion ===
In 2000, both Alphonse Persico and DeRoss were indicted on loansharking and conspiracy charges, but only Persico was convicted. DeRoss' was again acquitted, as he continued to run organized crime activities within the Colombo family, even after Persico was convicted.

On December 19, 2001, the government charged DeRoss and four co-defendants with racketeering, racketeering-conspiracy, loansharking, money laundering-conspiracy, conspiracy to distribute marijuana, extortion, embezzlement and mail fraud. On February 7, 2002, DeRoss was convicted. On May 22, 2003, the State of New Jersey officially excluded DeRoss from New Jersey casinos as he was now the official Colombo underboss. At the time, DeRoss was operating in Newark, New Jersey, Brooklyn, New York and Queens, New York.

On October 13, 2004, DeRoss pleaded guilty to one count of labor racketeering for arranging a "no show" job for the son of Joel Cacace. The judge sentence DeRoss to four years in prison.

=== Trial with Persico ===
In 2004, while both were in prison, DeRoss and Alphonse Persico went on trial for the 1999 Cutolo murder, and the 1991 Campanella attempted murder. DeRoss' former rival John "Sonny" Franzese took over as underboss after DeRoss went on trial. In November 2006, the trial ended in a hung jury.

The government retried DeRoss and Persico, this time with both Campanella and Cutolo's widow testifying against them. On December 28, 2007, DeRoss and Persico were convicted of the Cutolo murder. Both were given life imprisonment. In October 2008, FBI agents uncovered Cutolo's body from a field in Farmingdale, New York, on Long Island.

As of May 2015, DeRoss is serving his life sentence at USP McCreary, a maximum security penitentiary in Pine Knot, Kentucky.
