= Carmine Sessa =

American mobster

- Born: 1951 (age 74–75); Brooklyn, New York, United States
- Status: released from prison in 1997
- Occupation: consigliere of the Colombo crime family
- Conviction: murder-conspiracy charges under the RICO Act (1993)

Carmine Sessa, alias Carmine Marletta (born 1951), is an Italian-American mobster and former consigliere of the Brooklyn-based Colombo crime family, and played a key role in the family from 1991 to 1993. He later became a government witness.

== Biography ==
=== Murders ===
After becoming a government witness, Sessa admitted to personally murdering four people. In September 1984, Sessa murdered 31-year-old Mary Bari, a former girlfriend of then Colombo consigliere Alphonse Persico. When Persico went into hiding to avoid an indictment, the family decided to kill Bari out of concern that she knew Persico's location. Bari was lured into Sessa's social club Occasions on the pretext of a job interview. When Bari arrived, Sessa shot her three times in the head. Sessa's account is disputed, as Colombo crime family hitman Greg Scarpa also confessed to Bari's murder. In May 1988, Sessa murdered Anthony Bolino. Suspecting Bolino of robbing his dealers, Sessa shot him one time in the head on a street corner in Bayside. In November 1988, Sessa murdered Vincent Angellino, a top capo in the Colombo family. Angellino was lured to a home in Kenilworth, New Jersey, where Sessa shot him. In 1989, Sessa ordered the murder of Anthony Collucio, a member of Sessa's crew, suspecting Collucio of becoming an informant.

==== Attempted murder ====
In 1988, Sessa attempted to kill Dominick Costa as a service to the Lucchese crime family. Costa was a master safecracker for the Bypass Gang, a highly skilled group of bank robbers run by Lucchese mobster Anthony Casso in Bensonhurst, Brooklyn. When Casso discovered that Costa was a police informant, he decided to kill him. Casso hired Sessa because of his reputation as a hitman and because Costa did not know him. Sessa shot Costa five times in Costa's apartment, but Costa survived to later testify against the Lucchese family.

=== Colombo War ===
In 1991, a rivalry within the Colombo family erupted into war. Imprisoned family boss Carmine Persico planned to have his son Alphonse "Little Allie Boy" Persico become acting boss on his release from prison. In 1990, three years after becoming a made man in the Colombo family, Carmine Persico had appointed Sessa as consigliere. He was now part of the family leadership. In 1988, Persico appointed the former capo of Little Allie Boy's crew Victor Orena, as acting boss until Little Allie Boy's release. By 1991, Orena felt that he should be boss in his own right. He instructed Sessa to poll all the capos on whether they supported him or Carmine Persico as boss. Sessa ignored Orena's request and forwarded the information to Carmine Persico. At this point, Persico ordered Sessa to murder Orena.

On June 20, 1991, Sessa, Robert Zambardi, John Pate, and Hank Smurra went to Orena's Long Island, New York home to ambush and kill him. However, when Orena arrived at the house, he saw the trap, and escaped unharmed. As a result of the attempt, a two-year war erupted between the Persico and Orena factions. On November 29, 1991, Sessa's nephew, Larry Sessa was nearly killed during an ambush; Larry was chased down the street by masked gunmen and jumped into a friend's car. When the Colombo war ended with Orena's defeat, 12 people were dead out of 24 murder targets.

On April 8, 1993, Sessa and other Colombo mobsters were arrested while attending a secret meeting outside St. Patrick's Cathedral in Manhattan. He had been a fugitive for the previous nine months. Sessa was indicted on Racketeer Influenced and Corrupt Organizations Act murder conspiracy charges.

=== Government witness ===
Shortly after his 1993 indictment, Sessa, at the urging of his wife, pleaded guilty to four murders and became a government witness. Sessa went on to testify in eight mob trials. In the summer of 1997, Sessa was released on bail. However, that December, Sessa was arrested for gun possession by a convicted felon, domestic violence against his wife and stealing guns from his son. In 2000, Sessa was sentenced to time already served for the four murders. He told sentencing judge Jack Weinstein, "I hate everything about the life I led, and I hope that it ends soon because it keeps destroying families and kids who are infatuated with it and can't wait to be 'goodfellas.' I wish I could tell them what it really is."

In October 2007, Sessa testified at the corruption trial of former Federal Bureau of Investigation (FBI) agent Lindley DeVecchio. DeVecchio, the agent in charge of informant Gregory Scarpa, had the charges against him dismissed after revelations that the prosecution's star witness, Scarpa's girlfriend Linda Schiro, had given an interview denying that Scarpa was involved in the murders.
