= Aloi, Democratic Republic of the Congo =

Aloi
- Village
- Location within Democratic Republic of the Congo
- Coordinates: 0°30′N 29°9′E
- Country: Democratic Republic of the Congo
- Province: North Kivu
- Territory: Beni Territory
- Time zone: UTC+2 (CAT)

Aloi is a village in North Kivu in eastern Democratic Republic of the Congo.
