= Gregory Scarpa Jr. =

American mobster

- Born: Gregory J. Scarpa Jr. August 4, 1951 (age 75); Brooklyn, New York, U.S.
- Occupation: Mobster
- Parent: Gregory Scarpa (father)
- Status: Released (2020)
- Allegiance: Colombo crime family
- Conviction: Racketeering (1988)
- Penalty: 20 years imprisonment (1988), later amended to 40 years imprisonment (1999)

Gregory J. Scarpa Jr. (born August 4, 1951) is a former American mobster and caporegime in the Colombo crime family and government informant. He is the son of hitman and fellow caporegime in the family Gregory Scarpa. It is believed Scarpa Jr. murdered at least 11 people from between 1980 and 1987. Scarpa Jr. was primarily active in bank robbery, illegal gambling, and trafficking cocaine, marijuana, and heroin.

In February 1989, Scarpa Jr. was sentenced to 20 years in prison. In May 1999, Scarpa Jr. was sentenced to 40 years in prison. In November 2020, Scarpa Jr. was released after serving 31 years in prison.

== Early life ==
Gregory J. Scarpa Jr. was born on August 4, 1951, in Brooklyn, New York, to Connie Farace and Gregory Scarpa, a caporegime and hitman for the Colombo crime family. He pursued a criminal career in the Colombo organization, as had his father.

Federal authorities believed Scarpa murdered his associates Eliezer Shkolnik in 1980, Dominick Somma in 1980, Robert DiLeonardi in 1981, Alfred Longobardi in 1982, Albie Variale in 1983, Albert Nacha in 1985, Anthony Frezza in 1985, Michael Yodice in 1986, Jose Lopez in 1986, Joseph DeDomenico in 1987, and Ray Shapiro in 1987. Scarpa Jr. also plotted the murder and burial of suspected informant Sal Cardaci beneath a Bensonhurst store.

Scarpa succeeded his father as a capo in the Colombo family after his father contracted HIV/AIDS following a contaminated blood transfusion in 1986.

== Prison and informant ==
In August 1988, Scarpa Jr. was arrested by the DEA at a hotel in Lakewood, New Jersey, after he was indicted in January 1988 for racketeering and narcotics trafficking. In February 1989, Scarpa Jr. was sentenced by former U.S. District Judge I. Leo Glasser for racketeering, extortion, conspiracy to distribute narcotics, and narcotics trafficking.

In June 1995, Scarpa Jr. was indicted again for illegal gambling, narcotics, loansharking, and tax fraud. He was found guilty of conspiracy to murder, extortion, and conspiracy to defraud the United States in the collection of income taxes. In May 1999, Scarpa Jr. was sentenced by former U.S. District Judge Reena Raggi to 40 years in prison. In November 2020, Scarpa Jr. was released from prison due to severe health issues, including cancer, after serving stints at the Colorado Federal Penitentiary and at the New York Metropolitan Correctional Center.

=== Ramzi Yousef ===
Scarpa was jailed in Metropolitan Correctional Center, New York with terrorist Ramzi Yousef while the latter was being tried for masterminding the 1993 World Trade Center bombing. Scarpa provided the government with information against Yousef.

Scarpa claimed Yousef had spoken to him about plans to bomb an airplane or kidnap an American attorney to declare Yousef's 1996 trial a mistrial. He stated Yousef had implied assistance from a foreign government, presumably Qatar, since Yousef's maternal uncle Khalid Sheikh Mohammed was living there as the guest of a cabinet official at the time. On March 31, 1996, Scarpa claimed Yousef had sent a bomb through the DHL postal service and also named Abdul Hakim Murad as a co-conspirator in a plan to bomb an airplane several months later. Scarpa also stated Yousef had people from England scouting the Atlanta Olympic Games.

In 1999, prosecutors said that Scarpa's tips about Yousef were "a scam" which led nowhere. Judge Reena Raggi agreed, ruling that Scarpa had not provided substantial assistance but had actually colluded with Yousef to mislead the government and chose to amend his initial sentence by doubling the length of his imprisonment.

=== Terry Nichols ===
In 2005, Scarpa tipped off authorities about previously undiscovered explosives and ammunition buried in the crawl space of the home of Terry Nichols, a fellow prisoner at ADX Florence who had previously been convicted for his role in the Oklahoma City bombing. The Federal Bureau of Investigation had previously searched the home multiple times and the new discovery "embarrassed the F.B.I." according to Judge Edward Korman of the United States District Court for the Eastern District of New York.

In December 2015, Judge Korman issued an order reducing Scarpa's sentence to 30 years in prison due to his tip in the Oklahoma City bombing case. The reduction was reversed upon appeal to the United States Court of Appeals for the Second Circuit which reasoned that, although he had provided substantial assistance to the government, the government had the right not to reduce his sentence based on legitimate concerns related to his false statements in the Yousef case.

== Release ==
In November 2020, Judge Korman granted Scarpa a compassionate release from prison. Scarpa had been suffering from cancer and treatment had left him with no salivary glands and a hole in his throat.
