= Benedetto Aloi =

American mobster (1935–2011)

- Benedetto Aloi
- Born: October 6, 1935; Brooklyn, New York, U.S.
- Died: April 7, 2011 (aged 75); New York, U.S.
- Other name: Benny
- Occupation: Mobster
- Relatives: Vincenzo Aloi (brother)
- Allegiance: Colombo crime family
- Convictions: Extortion and conspiracy
- Penalty: 16 years and eight months' imprisonment and fined $100,000

Benedetto "Benny" Aloi (October 6, 1935 – April 7, 2011) was an American mobster in New York City, who became underboss of the Colombo crime family. Aloi was a main figure in the "Windows Case", Aloi was also a major figure in the Third Colombo War.

== Early years ==
Benedetto Aloi was born in Brooklyn and later lived in Ozone Park, Queens before relocating to Floral Park in the 1960s. Benedetto along with his brother Vincenzo joined their father Sebastian "Buster" Aloi in the Profaci crime family.

On November 19, 1974, Benedetto Aloi was indicted in Brooklyn along with 156 other mobsters on perjury charges. He was accused of lying to a grand jury that was investigating police collusion with an illegal gambling ring.

On June 28, 1984, Aloi was indicted on loansharking charges. Prosecutors alleged that he was involved with Resource Capital Group a company in Lake Success, New York, that lent over $1 million in a year and a half at interest rates of 2 percent or more per week.

== Windows case ==
From 1978 to 1990, four of the five crime families of New York rigged bids for 75 percent of $191 million, or about $142 million, of the window contracts awarded by the New York City Housing Authority. Installation companies were required to make union payoffs between $1 and $2 for each windows installed.

On May 30, 1990, Aloi was indicted in the "Windows case" along with other members of four of the New York crime families. On October 19, 1991, Aloi was convicted of one count of extortion and a related conspiracy count in the Windows case. On March 26, 1993, Aloi was sentenced to 16 years and eight months in prison and fined $100,000.

On March 17, 2009, Aloi was released from a halfway house in the Greater New York area. He died of natural causes on April 7, 2011.
