= Mafia Commission Trial =

1985–1986 criminal trial against the heads of New York City's "Five Families"

United States v. Salerno
- Court: United States District Court for the Southern District of New York
- Full case name: United States v. Anthony Salerno, et al
- Decided: November 19, 1986; 39 years ago (verdict); January 13, 1987; 39 years ago (sentencing)
- Verdict: Guilty as to 8 defendants (see text)

Court membership
- Judge sitting: Richard Owen

The Mafia Commission Trial (in full, United States v. Anthony Salerno, et al) was a criminal trial before the United States District Court for the Southern District of New York in New York City, New York, that began on February 25, 1985, and lasted until its conclusion on November 19, 1986. Using evidence obtained by the Federal Bureau of Investigation, 11 organized crime figures, including the heads of New York City's "Five Families", were indicted by United States Attorney Rudolph Giuliani under the Racketeer Influenced and Corrupt Organizations (RICO) Act on charges including extortion, labor racketeering, and murder. Eight of them were convicted under RICO, and most were sentenced to 100 years in prison on January 13, 1987, the maximum possible sentence under that law. Two others died during the trial.

The case struck a blow against "The Commission", a ruling committee consisting of the New York Five Families bosses that meet to resolve disputes or discuss criminal activities. Time called the trial the "Case of Cases" and possibly "the most significant assault on the infrastructure of organized crime since the high command of the Chicago Mafia was swept away in 1943", and quoted Giuliani's stated intention: "Our approach ... is to wipe out the five families."

== Background ==
In 1983, the Federal Bureau of Investigation recorded several wire tapped conversations of Ralph Scopo extorting money from contractors. Scopo was the president of the Cement and Concrete Workers District Council of the Laborers' International Union of North America from 1977 to April 1985. During this time, Scopo used his position to extort money from cement contractors in New York in return for large construction contracts and labor peace. Contracts between $2 million and $15 million were reserved for a club of contractors called the "Concrete Club", which were selected by The Commission. In return, the contractors gave a two-percent kickback of the contract value to The Commission.

Gennaro Langella supervised various labor rackets for the Colombo crime family, including their stake in the Concrete Club, and exerted control over various labor unions, including Cement and Concrete Workers District Council, Local 6A. Anthony Salerno also had hidden controlling interests in S & A Concrete Co. and Transit-Mix Concrete Corp.

In the early 1980s, Anthony Corallo unwittingly provided the government with evidence that would all but end his career. Over the years, Corallo and Salvatore Avellino established a stranglehold on the waste hauling business on Long Island. To gather evidence against Avellino, members of the New York State Organized Crime Task Force (OCTF) used undercover informant Robert Kubecka, the owner of a Suffolk County, New York, garbage hauling business. Since the 1970s, Kubecka had refused to participate with the mob control of the waste hauling business and had suffered extensive harassment as a result. In 1982, Kubecka agreed to wear a surveillance device during meetings with the mobsters. Although Kubecka was unable to get close to Avellino himself, the information Kubecka gathered eventually persuaded a judge to allow a wire tap on Avellino's home phone in Nissequogue, New York. The home phone tap was also disappointing to the agents; however, it did reveal that Avellino was driving Corallo around all day in Avellino's car.

In 1983, members of the New York State Organized Crime Task Force (OCTF) installed an electronic surveillance device inside the dashboard on Avellino's Jaguar while he and his wife were at a dinner dance. Agents then listened to many conversations between Corallo, Avellino, and other mobsters as they drove around the city. From these recorded conversations, OCTF learned the Commission's internal structure, history, and relations with other crime families. These conversations were shared with federal prosecutors and provided them with invaluable evidence against Corallo and other family bosses in the Mafia Commission Trial.

== Trial ==
=== Defendants ===
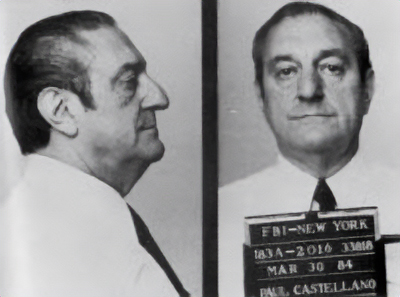
Paul Castellano

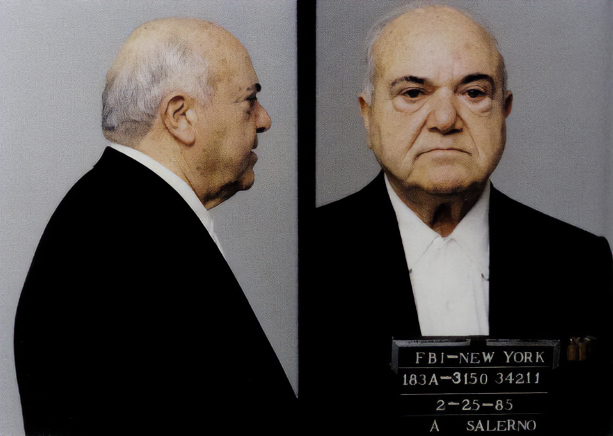
Anthony Salerno

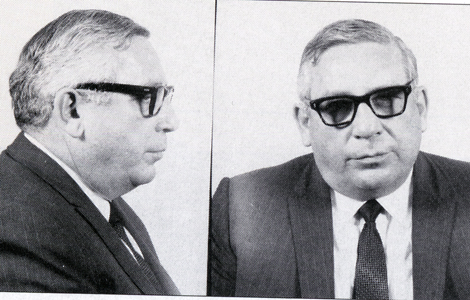
Anthony Corallo

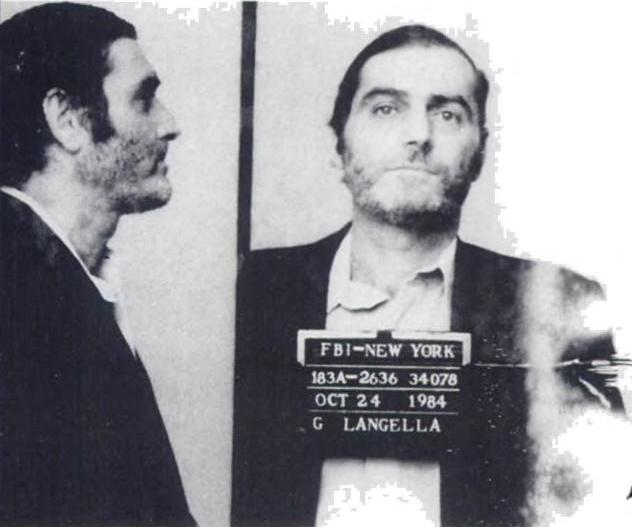
Gennaro Langella

The indictments and arrests on February 25, 1985, included nine defendants:

- Paul "Big Paul" Castellano, boss of the Gambino crime family
- Anthony "Fat Tony" Salerno, boss of the Genovese crime family
- Anthony "Tony Ducks" Corallo, boss of the Lucchese crime family
- Philip "Rusty" Rastelli, boss of the Bonanno crime family

as well as their subordinates,

- Aniello "Neil" Dellacroce, Gambino family underboss
- Gennaro "Gerry Lang" Langella, Colombo family acting boss/underboss
- Salvatore "Tom Mix" Santoro, Lucchese family underboss
- Christopher "Christy Tick" Furnari, Lucchese family consigliere
- Ralph "Little Ralphie" Scopo, Colombo family soldier

Added shortly after:

- Carmine "Junior" Persico, boss of the Colombo crime family
- Stefano Canone, Bonanno family consigliere
- Anthony "Bruno" Indelicato, Bonanno family capo

=== Developments ===
On February 25, 1985, nine New York Mafia leaders were indicted for narcotics trafficking, loansharking, gambling, labor racketeering and extortion against construction companies. On July 1, 1985, the original nine men, with the addition of two more New York Mafia leaders, pleaded not guilty to a second set of racketeering charges as part of the trial. Prosecutors aimed to strike at all the crime families at once using their involvement in the Commission. On December 2, 1985, Dellacroce died of cancer. Castellano was later murdered on December 16, 1985.

According to Colombo hitman and FBI informant Gregory Scarpa, Persico and Gambino boss John Gotti backed a plan to kill the lead prosecutor, and future New York mayor, Rudy Giuliani in late 1986, but it was rejected by the rest of the Commission.

In the early 1980s, the Bonanno family were kicked off the Commission due to the Donnie Brasco infiltration, and although Rastelli was one of the men initially indicted, this removal from the Commission actually allowed Rastelli to be removed from the Commission Trial as he was later indicted on separate labor racketeering charges. Having previously lost their seat on the Commission, the Bonannos suffered less exposure than the other families in this case.

When the lawyers for the accused mafiosi reviewed the evidence, they realized their clients' chances at trial were slim. However, when they sounded out possible plea bargain terms, Giuliani demanded that the defendants plead guilty to the stiffest charges in the indictment, which carried sentences that would have all but assured they would die in prison. The seven defense lawyers, as well as Persico's legal adviser (Persico was acting as his own lawyer) then decided to admit that the Mafia and the Commission existed, but argue that membership in the Mafia or being a boss were not in and of themselves evidence of criminal activity. The mafiosi initially balked, believing that it would amount to a violation of the code of omertà. However, the lawyers impressed upon their clients that they could not credibly deny the existence of the Mafia in the face of their own recorded references to it. Ultimately, the mafiosi agreed to this strategy as long as they did not have to personally admit the Mafia existed.

Hence, during his opening statement, Santoro's lawyer, Samuel Dawson, told the jury that there was no question that "the Mafia exists and has members," but asked, "Can you accept that just because a person is a member of the Mafia that doesn't mean he committed the crimes charged in this case?" It was the first admission in open court that the Mafia existed.

=== Verdicts ===
After six days of deliberations, the jury convicted eight defendants of racketeering on November 19, 1986, with the exception of Indelicato who was convicted of murder (of Carmine Galante), and were sentenced by judge Richard Owen on January 13, 1987, as follows:

Defendant	Position	Penalty	Status	Date of death
Anthony "Fat Tony" Salerno	Boss, Genovese family	100 years' imprisonment and fined $240,000	Deceased	July 27, 1992, MCFP Springfield
Antonio "Tony Ducks" Corallo	Boss, Lucchese family	100 years' imprisonment and fined $240,000	Deceased	August 23, 2000, MCFP Springfield
Salvatore "Tom Mix" Santoro	Underboss, Lucchese family	100 years' imprisonment and fined $250,000	Deceased	January 2000, in federal custody
Christopher "Christie Tick" Furnari	Consigliere, Lucchese family	100 years' imprisonment and fined $240,000	Deceased; had been released on September 19, 2014	May 28, 2018
Carmine "Junior" Persico	Boss, Colombo family	100 years' imprisonment and fined $240,000	Deceased	March 7, 2019, Duke University Medical Center
Gennaro "Gerry Lang" Langella	Acting boss/underboss, Colombo family	100 years' imprisonment and fined $240,000	Deceased	December 15, 2013, MCFP Springfield
Ralph "Ralphie" Scopo	Soldier, Colombo family	100 years' imprisonment and fined $240,000	Deceased	March 9, 1993, in federal custody
Anthony "Bruno" Indelicato	Capo, Bonanno family	40 years' imprisonment and fined $50,000	Released in 1998	N/A

Shortly after the trial, Salerno's longtime right-hand man, Vincent "The Fish" Cafaro, who had turned informant, told the FBI that Salerno had been a front for the real boss, Vincent "Chin" Gigante. Cafaro also revealed that the Genovese family had been keeping up this ruse since 1969. However, according to New York Times organized crime reporter Selwyn Raab, this would not have jeopardized Salerno's conviction at the Commission Trial or his 100-year sentence. In his book, Five Families, Raab noted that Salerno had been tried and convicted for specific criminal acts, not merely for being a boss.
