= Gregory Scarpa =

American mobster (1928–1994)

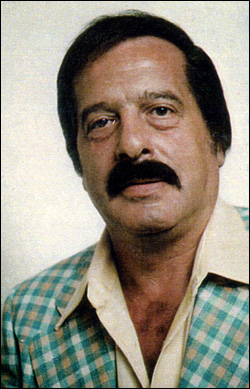
- Born: May 8, 1928; New York City, New York, U.S.
- Died: June 4, 1994 (aged 66); Rochester, Minnesota, U.S.
- Other names: The Grim Reaper; The Mad Hatter
- Occupations: Mobster, hitman
- Spouse: Connie Forrest (m. 1950; div. 1973)
- Children: 6, including Gregory Jr.
- Allegiance: Colombo crime family
- Conviction: Murder (1993)
- Penalty: Life imprisonment
- Accomplices: Linda Schiro (1964–1994; his death)

Gregory Scarpa Sr. (May 8, 1928 – June 4, 1994), nicknamed the Grim Reaper and the Mad Hatter, was an American caporegime (captain) and hitman for the Colombo crime family of New York City, as well as an informant for the FBI. During the 1970s and 1980s, Scarpa was the chief enforcer and veteran hitman for Colombo boss Carmine Persico. He was sentenced to life imprisonment for three murders in 1993 and died the following year.

== Biography ==
Gregory Scarpa was born in New York City on May 8, 1928. His parents were Salvatore and Mary Scarpa, first-generation immigrants from the village of Lorenzaga of Motta di Livenza near Treviso, Italy. He was raised in the working-class neighborhood of Bensonhurst in Brooklyn. As a child living in the Great Depression, Scarpa helped his father deliver coal throughout the city. His older brother, Salvatore Jr., may have introduced Gregory to the Colombo crime family, which he reportedly joined in the 1950s.

During the 1950s, Scarpa married Connie Farace. She and Scarpa had one daughter and three sons, including Gregory Scarpa Jr., who followed his father into the Colombo family and eventually rose to the rank of caporegime (captain). Scarpa and his wife separated in 1973. He maintained a thirty-year extramarital relationship with girlfriend Linda Schiro, which resulted in two children.

Scarpa was a stylish dresser who routinely carried $5,000 in pocket money for purchases and bribes. He had use of an apartment on Manhattan's Sutton Place and owned homes in Brooklyn and Staten Island, as well as Las Vegas and Singer Island, Florida. His power, guile and brutality earned him the nickname the "Grim Reaper" and helped him escape prosecution for many years. Schiro later recalled that Scarpa would sometimes leave the numbers "666", the biblical number of the beast, on his victims' pagers.

Scarpa eventually became a captain in the Colombo family, as well as the proprietor of the Wimpy Boys Social Club. He was involved in illegal gambling, loansharking, extortion, hijacking, counterfeiting, assault, stock and bond thefts, narcotics and murder. Many of the highest-ranking members of the family in the early 21st century were originally members of Scarpa's crew.

In March 1962, Scarpa was arrested for armed robbery. To avoid prosecution, he agreed to work as an undercover informant for the FBI, beginning a twenty-six-year relationship with the agency, with a five-year break between 1975 and 1980.

=== Recovery of the bodies of Chaney, Goodman, and Schwerner ===
In 1964, according to Schiro and other sources, FBI field agents in Mississippi recruited Scarpa to help them find missing civil rights workers Andrew Goodman, James Chaney and Michael Schwerner. The FBI was convinced the three men had been murdered, but could not find their bodies. In this narrative, agents thought that Scarpa, using illegal interrogation techniques the agents were not allowed to utilize, might succeed at gaining this information from suspects.

Once Scarpa arrived in Mississippi, local agents allegedly provided him with a gun and money to pay for information. Scarpa and an agent allegedly pistol-whipped and kidnapped Lawrence Byrd, a TV salesman and secret Klansman, from his store in Laurel and took him to Camp Shelby, a local United States Army base. At Shelby, Scarpa severely beat Byrd and stuck a gun down his throat. Byrd eventually revealed the location of the three men's bodies.

The FBI has never officially confirmed the Scarpa story. Though not necessarily contradicting the claim of his involvement in the matter, investigative journalist Jerry Mitchell and Illinois high school teacher Barry Bradford claimed that Mississippi highway patrolman Maynard King provided the grave locations to FBI agent Joseph Sullivan after obtaining the information from an anonymous third party.

In January 1966, Scarpa allegedly helped the FBI a second time in Mississippi on the murder case of Vernon Dahmer, who had been killed in a fire set by the Ku Klux Klan. After this second trip, Scarpa and the FBI had a sharp disagreement about his reward for these services. The agency dropped Scarpa as a confidential informant in 1975.

=== FBI informant ===
In 1980, FBI agent Lindley DeVecchio became Scarpa's contact and handler and restarted his relationship with the Bureau. Scarpa had refused contact with the FBI for the previous five years, but DeVecchio persuaded him to cooperate again. Gregory Jr., Schiro and federal prosecutors later claimed that Scarpa had numerous illegal dealings with DeVecchio. He allegedly provided DeVecchio with cash, jewelry and other gifts along with information of questionable value on the Colombo family. In return, DeVecchio allegedly protected Scarpa from arrest and provided him with information about his factional rivals during the Third Colombo War.

Over the years, the FBI reportedly paid Scarpa $158,000 for his services. According to mob associates, he would joke about his "girlfriend", a female friend in law enforcement who gave him information. For ten years, DeVecchio met alone with Scarpa, often at an apartment or hotel room provided by the Bureau. DeVecchio was a frequent dinner guest at Scarpa's house and on one occasion received a hard-to-find Cabbage Patch doll from Scarpa as a gift. Some of DeVecchio's fellow agents were disturbed by his closeness to Scarpa and were soon reporting their suspicions to superiors.

In 1985, federal prosecutors indicted Scarpa for running a major credit card scam. After he pleaded guilty, prosecutors asked the court to give him a sizable fine and prison sentence. However, DeVecchio submitted a memo to the judge that listed all of Scarpa's purported contributions to the FBI's efforts against organized crime. The judge finally sentenced Scarpa to five years probation with no prison time and a $10,000 fine. Colombo family members were so surprised by Scarpa's light sentence that some started wondering if he was working for the government.

=== HIV infection ===
After having emergency ulcer surgery at Victory Memorial Hospital in Brooklyn in 1986, Scarpa received several blood donations from family members and associates. He had refused blood from the hospital blood bank. Scarpa eventually received blood from mobster Paul Mele, a bodybuilder, who was using injectable anabolic steroids. Mele had contracted HIV from a dirty needle and transmitted it to Scarpa in the blood transfusion.

Surgeons at Mount Sinai Hospital eventually removed Scarpa's stomach. On August 30, 1992, he received a $300,000 settlement in civil court from his first surgeon and Victory Memorial Hospital for negligence. As Scarpa's illness progressed to AIDS, he and his relatives told everyone that he was suffering from cancer.

=== Assassination attempt and retaliation ===
In 1991, supporters of Colombo acting boss Victor Orena attempted to kill Scarpa. Earlier that year, a power struggle between Orena and imprisoned Colombo boss Carmine Persico had erupted into violence. Persico's loyalists unsuccessfully attempted to kill Orena at his Brooklyn home. In retaliation, Orena decided to murder Scarpa, one of Persico's strongest supporters.

On November 18, Scarpa was driving his own car in Brooklyn, followed behind by his twenty-two-year-old daughter Linda and eight-month-old grandson, when he was stopped by two cars. Hitmen ran from their vehicles with guns drawn and converged on Scarpa's car, but Scarpa managed to drive away from the ambush, crashing into anything that got in his way. Several bystanders were injured, but Scarpa and his relatives escaped unharmed.

During the seven-month conflict between Persico and Orena, Scarpa served as Persico's enforcer. Although weakened by illness, he constantly cruised along Avenue U in Brooklyn, looking for Orena supporters in social clubs and bars. Incensed by his family being endangered, Scarpa was especially watchful for Orena loyalist William Cutolo, who had organized the attempted hit. Over the next few weeks, Scarpa and his associates killed Genovese mobster Thomas Amato and Orena loyalists Rosario Nastasa, Vincent Fusaro and James Malpiso. Scarpa allegedly shot Fusaro as he was hanging Christmas lights on his house.

=== Prison and death ===
In 1992, Scarpa's lawsuit against Victory Memorial Hospital was settled with $300,000 in cash payments to his family. While appearing at a New York courtroom for his civil suit, he was arrested for violating state firearms laws. Soon after, he was indicted on federal racketeering charges involving three murders. In December 1992, two Lucchese mobsters, Michael DeRosa and Ronald Moran, threatened Scarpa's grandson Joey over a drug deal. On December 29, the elder Scarpa, who was under house arrest, drove with Joey to DeRosa's home and shot him. Moran fired back and hit Scarpa in the eye. Back at his house, Scarpa allegedly poured some Scotch whisky into his wound, assured the authorities everything was fine and later went to the hospital. Prosecutors revoked Scarpa's house arrest and sent him to jail.

By 1993, Scarpa was blind in one eye, emaciated and in poor health. On May 6 he pleaded guilty to three murders and conspiracy to murder several others. On December 15, Scarpa was sentenced to life in federal prison. This sentence was later reduced to ten years due to Scarpa's poor health. Scarpa died in the Federal Medical Center in Rochester, Minnesota, from AIDS-related complications on June 4, 1994.

=== Aftermath ===
Scarpa's status as an FBI informant was only revealed in 1995, during a racketeering and murder trial of seven members of the Orena faction. At that time, former Colombo family consigliere Carmine Sessa, now a government witness, told prosecutors about DeVecchio's corrupt dealings with Scarpa. Eventually, prosecutors were forced to reveal that DeVecchio might have revealed confidential information, including information about former Colombo members who had turned informant, to Scarpa. Ultimately, nineteen Orena supporters had murder charges thrown out or murder convictions reversed after their attorneys contended DeVecchio's collaboration with Scarpa tainted the evidence against them. Attorneys argued that DeVecchio gave Scarpa information he used to kill members of the Orena faction, thus making any killings committed by their clients acts of self-defense.

In March 2006, DeVecchio, who was forced to retire from the FBI in 1996, was indicted on charges of complicity with Scarpa and other Colombo mobsters in four murders during the 1980s and 1990s. The government case rested on the testimony of Schiro, who was soon discredited as a witness after Tom Robbins of The Village Voice revealed that she had granted an interview to Robbins and Jerry Capeci a decade earlier and denied DeVecchio had ever been involved. Robbins said that while he and Capeci had promised to protect Schiro's identity and not attribute any of her revelations to her by name, the prospect of DeVecchio facing life in prison trumped any promises they had made to Schiro. In November 2007, the judge dismissed all charges against DeVecchio at the request of prosecutors.

Scarpa's other son, Gregory Scarpa Jr., was sentenced to forty years in prison for racketeering, conspiracy to commit murder and other charges. Scarpa Jr. has been linked to twenty-four murders. He was active in the Colombo family from the 1970s to 1990s, ran a large and profitable marijuana ring in Brooklyn and Staten Island and extorted money from rival drug dealers in Bensonhurst. Judge Edward Korman commuted Scarpa Jr.'s sentence by ten years in January 2016 after he provided information to the FBI in regard to the whereabouts of explosives, which were found hidden at the home of Oklahoma City bombing conspirator Terry Nichols. His original sentence was reinstated in mid-2017.

== In media ==
=== Books ===
The 2009 book Mafia Son: The Scarpa Mob Family, the FBI, and a Story of Betrayal by Sandra Harmon, covers the author's access to the mob, law enforcement and jailed Gregory Scarpa Jr. revealing the crimes and acts of betrayal.

The 2013 book Deal with the Devil: The FBI's Secret Thirty-Year Relationship with a Mafia Killer by Peter Lance, reports on 30 years of FBI files revealing Scarpa's secret betrayal to the Colombo crime family while being an FBI informant.

The 2015 book The Mafia Hit Man's Daughter by Linda Scarpa; Linda Rosencrance, reflects Scarpa's history from his daughter Linda Scarpa's perspective.

=== Television and film ===
In May 2011, the CBS series 60 Minutes aired the episode "Armstrong/The FBI and the Grim Reaper" (season 43, episode 34), with a majority of the episode, "Armstrong", reporting on cyclist Lance Armstrong and the use of performance-enhancing drugs. A brief portion of the episode, "The FBI and the Grim Reaper", examines FBI agent Lin DeVecchio's ties to informant Gregory Scarpa.

In July 2011, the Investigation Discovery channel series I Married a Mobster, released the episode "The Grim Reaper" (season 1, episode 3), reporting on Linda Schiro, a Brooklyn teenager, and her love triangle involving Scarpa and another man (both men were married). Scarpa wins Linda's devotion and shows her struggles with losing a child, impacts from his Mafia ties and being left alone upon his downfall.

The Biography Channel series Mobsters, 2012 episode "The Grim Reaper: Greg Scarpa" (season 5, episode 5) depicts Scarpa's Mafia ties, father and husband lifestyles, and his FBI informant profile.

Investigation Discovery released a second documentary of Scarpa's crimes in the episode "The Grim Reaper" (season 4, episode 7) from the series Evil Lives Here in 2018.

In the 1988 film Mississippi Burning, the character of Agent Monk (portrayed by Badja Djola) and his abduction of a Klansman were based on Scarpa and his alleged abduction and intimidation of a Klansman. The abductor of the Klan-connected Mayor Tilman was originally written as a Mafia hitman who forces a confession by putting a pistol in Tillman's mouth. Screenwriter Chris Gerolmo was inspired to create this character after reading about Scarpa's alleged recruitment by the FBI during their search for Goodman, Chaney and Schwerner.

Scarpa is portrayed by Mark Wahlberg in the 2026 historical crime film By Any Means, which is loosely based on his time as an informant for the FBI.

== See also ==
- Mississippi Burning
