= Carmine Persico =

American mob boss (1933–2019)

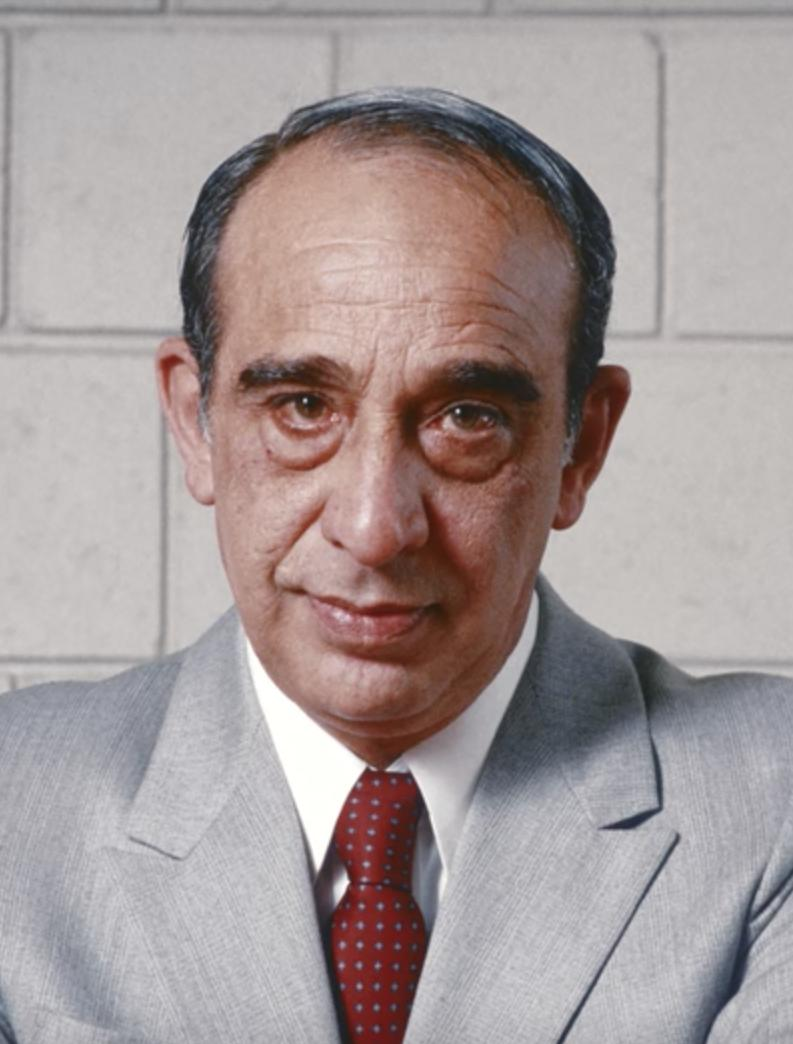
- Persico in 1989
- Born: Carmine John Persico Jr. August 8, 1933; New York City, New York, U.S.
- Died: March 7, 2019 (aged 85); Durham, North Carolina, U.S.
- Other names: "Junior", "The Snake", "Immortal"
- Occupation: Crime boss
- Predecessor: Joseph Colombo
- Successor: Andrew Russo
- Children: 3, including Alphonse Persico
- Allegiance: Colombo crime family
- Convictions: Hijacking and loan-sharking (1973); Conspiracy and racketeering (1981); Racketeering (1986); Racketeering (1986)
- Penalty: Eight years' imprisonment (1973); Five years' imprisonment (1981); 39 years' imprisonment (1986); 100 years' imprisonment and fined $240,000 (1987)

Carmine John Persico Jr. (Italian: [ˈkarmine ˈpɛrsiko]; August 8, 1933 – March 7, 2019), also known as "Junior", "The Snake" and "Immortal", was an American mobster and the longtime boss of the Colombo crime family in New York City from 1973 until his death in 2019. He served 32 years in federal prison from 1987 until his death on March 7, 2019.

== Youth and crimes ==
=== Background ===
Carmine Persico was born in Brooklyn, New York, to Carmine John Persico Sr. and Assunta "Susan" Plantamura. His father was a legal stenographer for several law firms in Manhattan. His brothers Theodore Persico and Alphonse "Allie Boy" Persico (died 1989) also became caporegimes in the Colombo crime family. His son Alphonse, named after the boy's uncle and commonly known as "Little Allie Boy", eventually became a capo as well. He was the uncle of Theodore Persico Jr. The family lived in the Carroll Gardens and Red Hook sections of Brooklyn.

Persico dropped out of high school at age 16. By then he was a leader of the Garfield Boys, a Brooklyn street gang. However, one contemporary source says that in 1950 he had actually belonged to the South Brooklyn Boys, a successor gang to the Garfield Boys. In March 1951, 17-year-old Carmine Persico was arrested in Brooklyn and held without bail on a homicide charge in the fatal shooting of Steve Bove, 26. Police said they were also seeking Persico's brother in connection with the killing. In the early 1950s, Persico was recruited into the Profaci crime family, the forerunner of the Colombo family, by longtime capo Frank Abbatemarco. At first Persico did bookmaking and loan-sharking, then moved into burglaries and hijackings. During this decade he was arrested over 12 times but spent only a few days in jail. He also started working with Joe Gallo and his brothers, Albert Gallo and Larry Gallo.

=== Anastasia murder ===
In 1957, Persico allegedly participated in the murder of Albert Anastasia, the former leader of Murder, Inc. and the boss of what was then the Anastasia family. Anastasia's underboss Carlo Gambino wanted control of the family and conspired with his allies, Genovese family boss Vito Genovese and Profaci boss Joe Profaci, to kill Anastasia. Profaci allegedly gave the job to Persico and the Gallo brothers.

On October 25, 1957, Anastasia entered the barbershop of the Park Sheraton Hotel in Midtown Manhattan. As he relaxed in the barber chair, two men—with scarves covering their faces—rushed in, shoved the barber out of the way and fired at Anastasia. After the first volley of bullets, Anastasia allegedly tried to lunge at his killers. However, the stunned Anastasia had actually attacked the gunmen's reflections in the wall mirror of the barber shop. The gunmen continued firing, finally killing Anastasia. No one was ever charged in the Anastasia killing.

== Profaci and Magliocco regimes ==
=== The Gallo faction ===
By the late 1950s, Persico and the Gallos were becoming increasingly dissatisfied with Profaci's leadership. Profaci demanded high tribute payments from family members and was viewed as a wealthy autocrat. The First Colombo War started on November 4, 1959, when Profaci's gunmen murdered Abbatemarco on a Brooklyn street. Abbatemarco had stopped paying tribute to Profaci earlier that year with the support of the Gallo faction. It is speculated that Carlo Gambino and Lucchese family boss Tommy Lucchese were encouraging the Gallos to challenge Profaci, their enemy. When Profaci took Abbatemarco's lucrative rackets away from the Gallos, the warfare began.

On February 27, 1961, the Gallos, led by Joe Gallo, kidnapped four of Profaci's top men: underboss Joseph Magliocco, Frank Profaci (Joe Profaci's brother), capo Salvatore Musacchia and soldier John Scimone. Profaci himself eluded capture and flew to sanctuary in Florida. While holding the hostages, Larry and Albert Gallo sent Joe Gallo to California. Profaci's Capo & later underboss John ‘Sonny’ Franzese negotiated with the Gallos and all the hostages were released peacefully.

=== Changing sides ===
On August 20, 1961, Joe Profaci ordered the murder of Gallo members Joseph "Joe Jelly" Gioielli and Larry Gallo. Gunmen allegedly murdered Gioielli after inviting him to go deep-sea fishing. Gallo survived a strangulation attempt in the Sahara club of East Flatbush by Persico and Salvatore "Sally" D'Ambrosio after a police officer intervened. The Gallos then began calling Persico "The Snake"; he had betrayed them, the war continued on, resulting in nine murders and three disappearances. Persico was indicted later that year for the attempted murder of Gallo, but the charges were dropped when Gallo refused to testify.

On June 6, 1962, Profaci died of cancer and Magliocco became the new family boss. However, the war with the Gallo faction continued. In early 1963, Persico survived a car bombing and his enforcer Hugh McIntosh was shot in the groin as he attempted to kill Larry Gallo. On May 19, 1963, Gallo gunmen ambushed Persico in the Gowanus section of Brooklyn. A panel truck pulled alongside Persico's car and two men shot him in the face, hand and shoulder. Persico reportedly spat out the bullet that had entered his face. Soon after this attempt on his life, Persico was imprisoned on extortion charges. By the fall of 1963, with Joey Gallo also imprisoned, the shooting war had ended with Magliocco the winner.

In late 1963, after an unsuccessful attempt to take over the Commission, Magliocco was forced into retirement. He was replaced by Colombo, who had alerted the Commission to Magliocco's plot. The Profaci crime family was now the Colombo crime family. In turn, Colombo rewarded the imprisoned Persico by naming him a capo.

== Colombo regime ==
=== Profitable crew ===
After he was promoted to capo, Persico was constantly on the streets. He was involved in labor racketeering, extortion, loan-sharking, hijacking, illegal gambling, and especially murder for hire. By the late 1960s, Persico's crew was one of the most profitable in the Colombo family. In 1968, Persico was convicted on federal hijacking charges after five separate trials dating back to 1960. On January 27, 1972, he was finally sent to prison on these charges, where he would spend eight years. The trial was noted for the only appearance of former mobster Joseph Valachi as a prosecution witness.

=== Colombo and Gallo shootings ===
In February 1971, Joey Gallo was released from prison. On June 28, Colombo was shot and severely wounded at the second annual Italian-American Civil Rights League rally in Manhattan. The shooter, a black ex-convict named Jerome Johnson, was immediately shot dead by Colombo's bodyguards. Colombo survived in a paralyzed state until his death on May 22, 1978. Police concluded that Johnson was the sole shooter. Both law enforcement and the Mafia assumed Gallo had organized the hit; he had built ties with black gangsters while in prison and, upon his release, threatened to start another gang war unless he received $100,000 compensation.

On November 11, 1971, Persico went on trial in state court on 37 counts of extortion, usury, coercion, and conspiracy, all stemming from a loan-sharking operation out of a Manhattan fur shop. On December 8 a jury acquitted him of all charges; all 12 prosecution witnesses said they could not identify Persico.

After the Colombo shooting, underboss Joseph Yacovelli assumed the role of acting boss. On April 7, 1972, Joey Gallo was shot and killed by Persico gunmen as he was celebrating his birthday at Umberto's Clam House in Manhattan's Little Italy. Looking for revenge, Albert Gallo sent a gunman from Las Vegas to the Neapolitan Noodle restaurant in Manhattan, where Yacovelli, Alphonse Persico, and Gennaro Langella were dining one day. However, the gunman did not recognize the mobsters and shot four innocent diners instead, killing two of them. After this assassination attempt, Yacovelli fled New York, leaving Persico as the new boss, with Persico himself coordinating the suppression of the Gallos.

== Persico regime ==
=== Prison ===
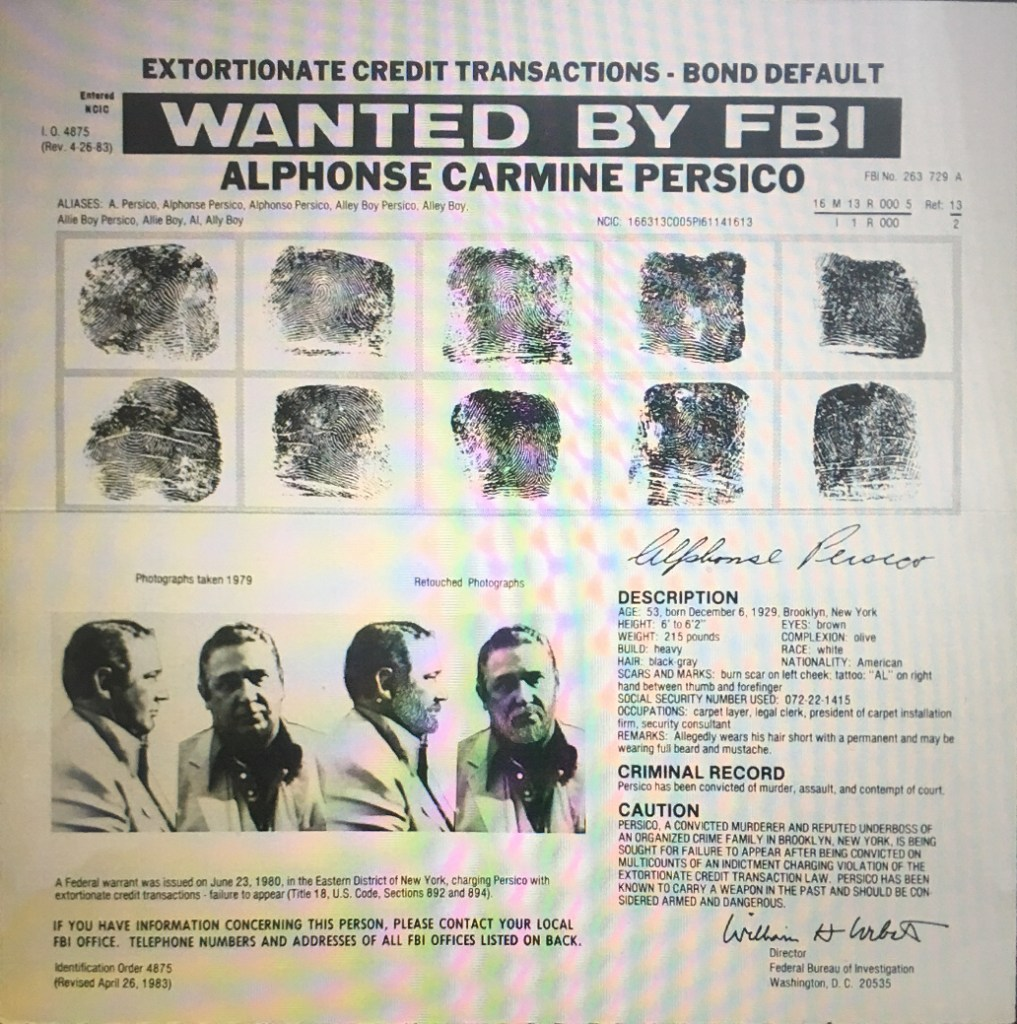
FBI Wanted Poster of Carmine's brother Alphonse Persico which was issued on April 26, 1983

In 1973, Persico was imprisoned on hijacking and loan-sharking charges, and sentenced to eight years in prison. His incarceration coincided with the release of his brother Alphonse from 17 years in prison. Persico designated Alphonse as acting boss with support as underboss from Gennaro Langella and Carmine's other brother, Theodore. Langella supervised various labor rackets for the family, including their stake in the "Concrete Club", and exerted control over various labor unions, including Cement and Concrete Workers District Council, Local 6A. In 1979, Persico was released from federal prison.

On August 11, 1981, Persico pleaded guilty to a conspiracy charge of attempting to bribe an IRS agent from 1977 to 1978 while in federal custody. The evidence included a recording of Persico offering the agent $250,000 in exchange for getting him an early release from prison. On November 9, 1981, Persico was sentenced to five years in federal prison.

=== Federal fugitive ===
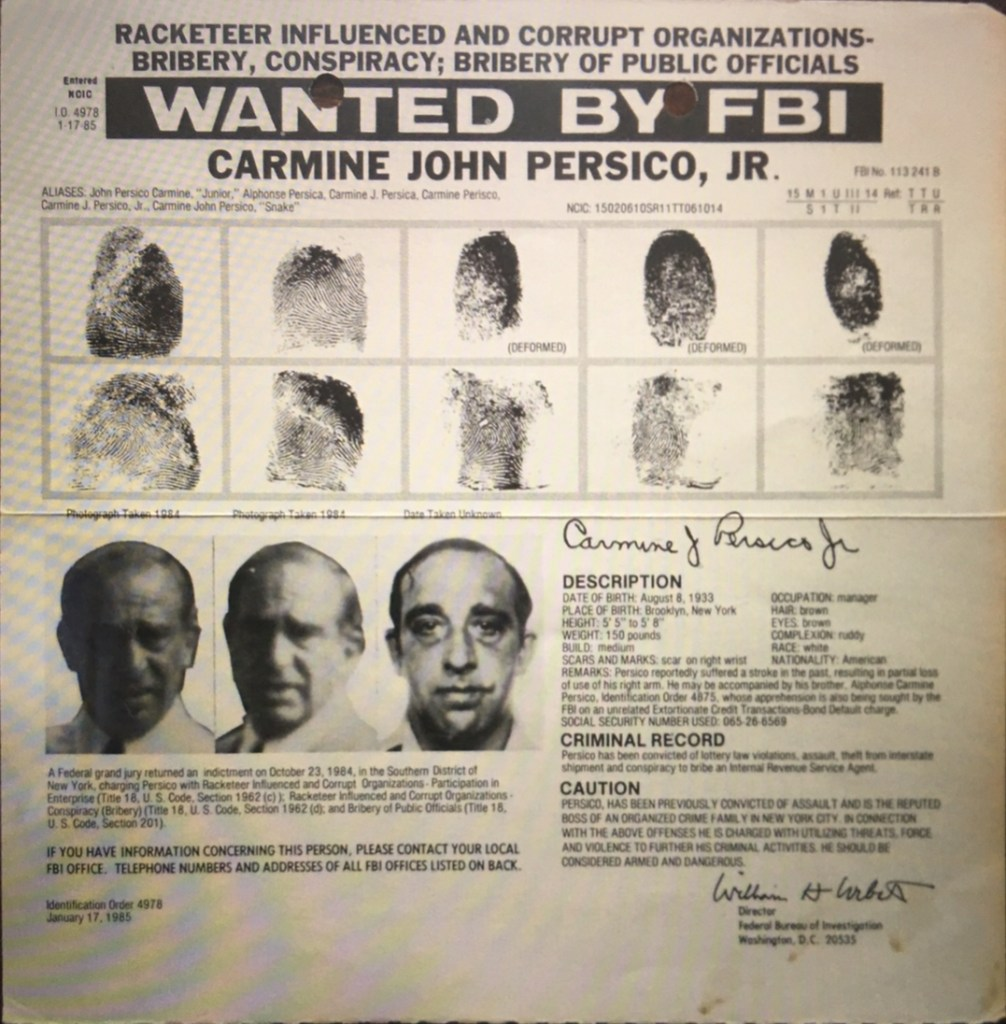
FBI Wanted Poster of Carmine John Persico Jr., issued on January 17, 1985

On October 14, 1984, Persico and the rest of the Colombo family leadership were indicted on multiple racketeering charges as part of the "Colombo Trial". After the indictment was published, Persico went into hiding. On October 26, the FBI began a national manhunt for Persico, and soon named him as the 390th fugitive to be added to their Ten Most Wanted list.

Persico hid in the home of his brother-in-law and minor mob associate Fred DeChristopher, in Hempstead, New York. Unbeknownst to Persico, DeChristopher had been relaying information to the FBI for the previous two years after being caught up in a sting operation, and had already told the Bureau of Persico's whereabouts. The FBI concocted the fake "manhunt" to shield DeChristopher, who would later provide damning testimony against Persico as a key witness for the prosecution. Persico was arrested on February 15, 1985, at the home of DeChristopher. An FBI agent actually called the residence and spoke with Persico, telling him the house was surrounded. Persico and another mob associate that had been visiting him surrendered peacefully. Persico, the only head of a mafia family to ever make the Ten Most Wanted list, later autographed one of the posters for an FBI agent.

On July 1, Persico pleaded not guilty along with 11 other New York Mafia leaders, after a previous indictment on a second set of racketeering charges as part of the Mafia Commission Trial. Prosecutors aimed to strike at all the crime families at once using their involvement in the commission. According to Colombo hitman and FBI informant Gregory Scarpa, Persico and Gambino boss John Gotti backed a plan to kill the lead prosecutor, and future New York mayor, Rudy Giuliani in late 1986, but it was rejected by the rest of the commission.

=== Life imprisonment ===
==== Colombo and Commission trials ====
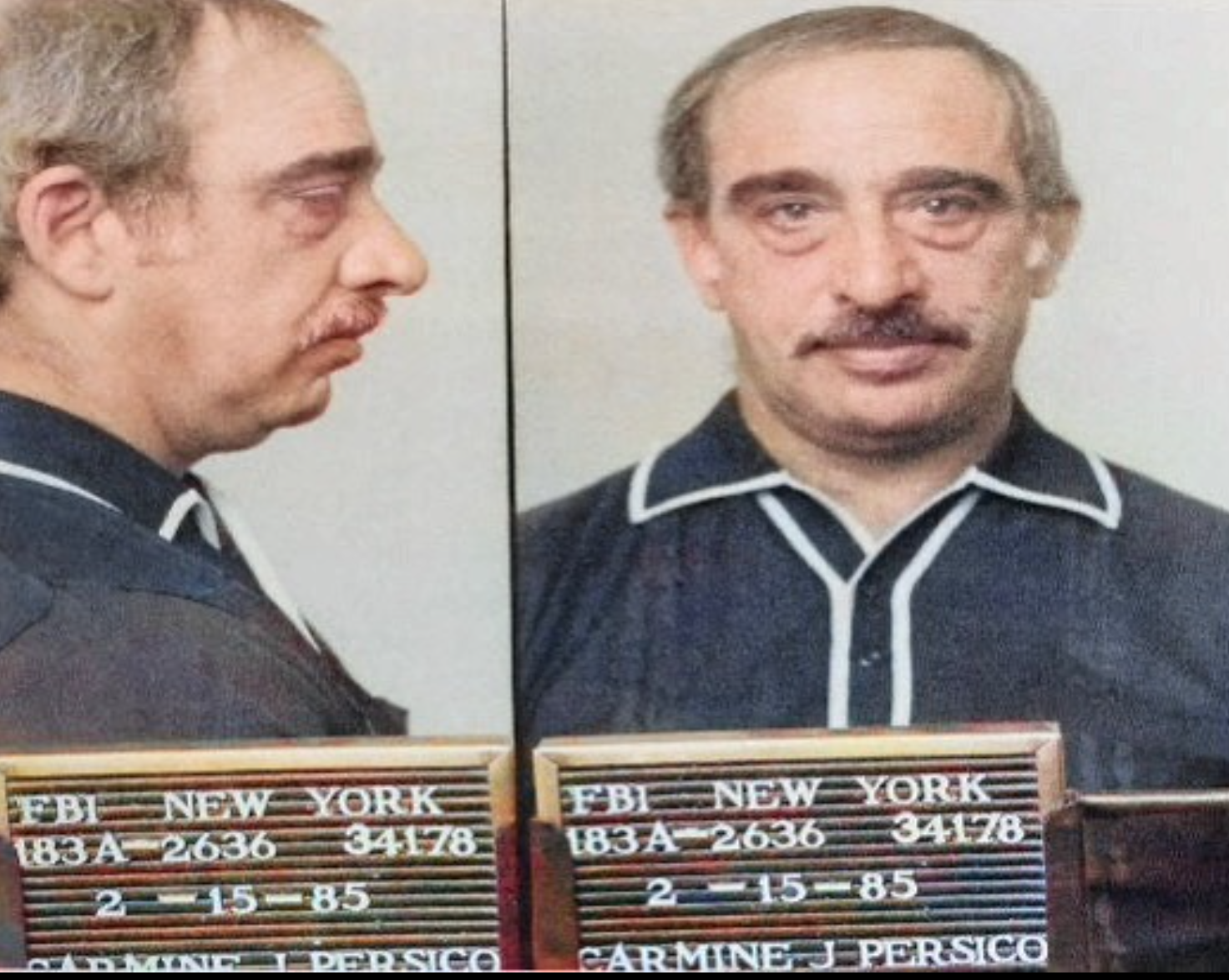
FBI 1985 Mugshot of Carmine Persico

At the start of the commission trial Persico decided to serve as his own lawyer. He believed that his history of convictions gave him sufficient experience to defend himself. His co-defendants vehemently disagreed with this decision, and the judge warned Persico that he would be waiving "incompetent counsel" as the grounds for an appeal. Persico received counsel from lawyers to help guide him when the prosecutors questioned him. He tried to project a friendly image to the jury and urged them to put aside any preconceptions about "the Mafia" or "Cosa Nostra". Many believe that Persico inadvertently sabotaged his own defense by acknowledging criminal activities during his cross-examinations of prosecution witnesses.

On June 14, 1986, Persico was convicted of racketeering in the Colombo Trial. On November 17, he was sentenced to 39 years in prison. The sentencing judge, John F. Keenan, nonetheless praised Persico's performance as his own lawyer in the commission trial and said, "Mr. Persico, you're a tragedy. You are one of the most intelligent people I have ever seen in my life." On November 19, Persico and the other commission trial defendants were convicted on all charges. On January 13, 1987, Keenan sentenced Persico to 100 years in prison, to run consecutively with his 39-year sentence in the Colombo trial, a $240,000 fine, and given no option for parole.

Selwyn Raab, longtime organized crime reporter for The New York Times, thought the Colombos were the most damaged by the trial, even though most of the top leaders of New York's Mafia families were sent to prison, with the Luccheses losing their entire hierarchy. In his book Five Families, Raab noted that Persico was only 53 years old at the time of the Commission Trial, making him by far the youngest boss in New York. However, Raab noted, Persico had already led the family for 14 years and was "at the peak of his abilities." He believed Persico would have potentially had a long reign ahead of him had he not been imprisoned. By comparison, the other bosses were in their 70s, and would have likely passed the reins to men of Persico's generation even without the trial intervening. Persico was sent to United States Penitentiary near Marion, Illinois, to serve his combined 139-year sentence.

By 2017, Persico was in the medium-security Federal Correctional Complex in Butner, North Carolina. The facility has medical facilities for elderly inmates. Press reports indicated he had become friends with convicted fraudster Bernie Madoff.

==== Revenge ====
In June 1987, Persico ordered acting boss Joel Cacace to kill lawyer William Aronwald, a retired prosecutor who had allegedly been disrespectful to the Mafia. Cacace delegated the job to two hitmen who mistakenly killed Aronwald's father George. In response to outrage from the other New York families, Cacace recruited two more gunmen to kill the first hit team. After those murders were accomplished, Cacace killed the second set of gunmen. In 2004, Cacace would plead guilty to the Aronwald murder. No charges were filed against Persico.

==== Brooklyn rivalry ====
Persico realized that he would likely die in prison, and would thus never be able to resume active control of the family. He was, however, determined to ensure that his cut of the Colombo rackets continued to flow to his relatives. To that end, soon after he was sentenced, he named his brother, Allie Boy, as acting boss. Allie Boy did not reign long, however; he was arrested for loansharking and averted bail. Persico then named a three-man ruling panel to run the family. In 1988, he dissolved the panel and named Victor "Little Vic" Orena, a loyal capo from Brooklyn, as temporary acting boss. While giving Orena the power to induct members and order murders on his own authority—unusual for an acting boss—Persico made it clear that Orena was merely a placeholder until Persico's son, Little Allie Boy, was released from prison. Indeed, Persico picked Orena in part because he was the capo of Little Allie Boy's old crew. Knowing that Little Allie Boy would be 40 years old by the time he was paroled, Persico wanted to ensure that his son would be able to inherit the family's riches as soon as he was released.

In 1990, the government transferred Persico to what was then the United States Penitentiary in Lompoc, California. There he established an Italian Cultural Club for the inmates. He socialized with people such as Patriarca family consigliere Joseph Russo and Lucchese family associate Anthony Senter. Persico formed the "Lompoc Four", a band in which Russo played guitar and Persico played drums.

By 1991, Orena had become disgruntled with the current leadership scheme and was tired of the constant stream of orders that he received from Persico in prison. He also grew to resent that he would have to turn over the family to Little Allie Boy. John Gotti encouraged Orena's rebellion, since he and Persico had long been enemies, and went so far as to label Persico a "rat", the worst possible accusation for a Cosa Nostra figure.

In the spring of 1991, Orena made a push to become boss in his own right. He requested that consigliere Carmine Sessa quietly poll all the Colombo capos as to whom they wanted as boss. Orena believed that if he had enough support from the capos, it would strengthen his argument that the Commission should recognize Orena, not Persico, as the rightful leader of the family. However, Sessa instead told Persico about Orena's plot. Persico then allegedly ordered Sessa to lead a team to kill Orena. On June 20, Sessa took a five-man hit team and parked on the street close to Orena's residence on Long Island, waiting for his return home. As Orena drove down the street, he recognized the men in the car and quickly sped away. For the next several months, the Persico and Orena factions engaged in peace negotiations brokered by the Commission. Despite Persico's claim as the legitimate boss, the Commission refused to take sides in the Colombo conflict.

==== Third Colombo war ====
On November 18, 1991, the Third Colombo War started when Orena lieutenant William Cutolo sent a hit team to try to kill Scarpa, a Persico loyalist, in Brooklyn. By the end of 1991, the two Colombo factions had traded several successful murder attempts. Responding to public outrage over the carnage, law enforcement threw resources into prosecuting the Colombo mobsters, resulting in 68 indictments, 58 convictions and ten mobsters turning state's evidence. In December 1992, Orena was convicted of racketeering and murder and was sentenced to life in prison, dissolving his belligerent faction and leaving the Persicos in control again.

==== Changing family structure ====
With the end of the war with Orena, Persico had to set up another ruling structure for the family. Since Little Allie Boy was facing prosecution on new charges, Persico installed a ruling committee comprising his brother, Theodore, mobster Joseph Baudanza and Joseph Tomasello. In 1994, when Andrew Russo was released from prison, Persico disbanded the committee and designated Russo as acting boss. In 1996, Russo went to prison and Persico replaced him with his son, Little Allie Boy, who by now had been released from prison. In early 1999, with Alphonse in legal trouble, Persico made Cacace the acting boss.

However, later in 1999, either Carmine or Alphonse Persico ordered Cutolo's murder. The recently released Alphonse was facing new federal charges that threatened to send him back to prison, and the Persicos were worried about Cutolo seizing control of the family. On May 26, 1999, Alphonse ordered Cutolo to meet him at a Brooklyn park. Cutolo was then taken to a mob associate's apartment and murdered, and his body was buried in Long Island. Police would not recover the remains until November 2008.

=== Life sentence for Alphonse Persico ===
On December 20, 2001, Alphonse Persico pleaded guilty to the loan-sharking charges, accepted a 13-year prison sentence and agreed to forfeit $1 million. On October 14, 2004, he was indicted on federal racketeering charges, including conspiring to murder Cutolo and Joe Campanella. No charges were filed against Carmine Persico. However, the Cutolo murder trial ended in a mistrial due to juror deadlock.

In 2004, with the conversion of Lompoc into a different correctional facility, the government transferred Carmine Persico to the Federal Correctional Complex, Butner, a medium-security correctional facility in North Carolina.

On December 28, 2007, in a second trial, Alphonse Persico and DeRoss were convicted of Cutolo's murder. Like his father, Alphonse Persico was sentenced to life in prison.

==== Later leadership ====
In 2011, Carmine Persico was still the official boss of the Colombo crime family. His street boss at the time was Andrew Russo, his official underboss John Franzese, the acting underboss Benjamin Castellazzo, and the consigliere Richard Fusco.

In March 2010, the Reuters News Agency reported that Carmine Persico had been socializing in prison with convicted swindler Bernard Madoff. The New York Post further reported that Persico loved to play pinochle and bocce with other mobsters and regale them with stories from his past.

Persico's projected release date was March 20, 2050—when he would have been 117 years old. Raab wrote in Five Families that Persico's attempts to protect his own position and ensure that his son succeeded him nearly destroyed the Colombo family. By Raab's estimate, Persico's "deceitful schemes" led directly to 70 of his fellow mobsters and associates being sent to prison, as well as 12 deaths.

== Death ==
On March 7, 2019, Persico died at Duke University Medical Center in Durham, North Carolina.

American Mafia
Preceded by Vincenzo Aloi as acting boss	Colombo crime family Boss; 1973–1990	Succeeded by Victor Orena as de facto boss
Preceded by Victor Orena as de facto boss	Colombo crime family Boss; 1993–2019	Succeeded by TBD
