= Consigliere =

Advisor to a mafia boss

Consigliere (/ˌkɒnsɪliˈɛəri/ KON-sil-ee-AIR-ee, Italian: [konsiʎˈʎɛːre]; pl. consiglieri) is a position within the administrative structure of the Sicilian, Calabrian, and Italian-American Mafia. The word consigliere was popularized in English by the 1969 novel The Godfather and by its 1972 film adaptation. In the novel, a consigliere is an advisor or counselor to the boss, with the additional responsibility of representing the boss in important meetings both within the boss's crime family and with other crime families.

The consigliere is a close, trusted friend and confidant, the mob's version of an elder statesman. A consigliere functions as an advisor to the boss in a Mafia crime family, and sometimes as their "right-hand man". By the very nature of the job, a consigliere is one of the few in the family who can argue with the boss, and is often tasked with challenging the boss when needed, to ensure subsequent plans are foolproof.

The boss, underboss, and consigliere constitute the top three positions and form a three-man ruling panel, or "administration".

== Etymology ==
The structure of a Mafia crime family

In Italian, consigliere means 'advisor' or 'counselor' and is still a common title for members of city councils in Italy and Switzerland. It is derived from the Latin consiliarius (advisor) and consilium (advice).

In the novel The Godfather, the word is spelled consigliori. In the films, it is clearly pronounced consigliere. Joe Bonanno explains in his book A Man of Honor that a consigliere is more the voice or representative of the soldiers of the family, and that he may help to mediate in or resolve disputes on behalf of the lower echelons of the family.

== American Mafia ==
Joe Valachi mentions a mysterious "Sandino" arbitrating disputes as the Genovese family consigliere in the 1940s. Consiglieri in more recent times have tended to take a more active role in family affairs. In 1971, Colombo family consigliere Joseph Yacovelli directed a murder campaign against renegade Colombo family soldier Joseph "Crazy Joe" Gallo. Two decades later, another Colombo consigliere, Carmine Sessa, led a hit team that attempted to assassinate the acting boss, Victor Orena.

Frank Bompensiero was appointed consigliere of the Los Angeles crime family in 1976, only to be murdered in a public phone booth in February 1977. His boss had promoted Bompensiero so as to induce him to let his guard down. Electronic surveillance in 1979 recorded New England Mafia boss Raymond L. S. Patriarca talking about appointing his consigliere, so the position need not be chosen as a result of a consensus-seeking process.

When New Jersey consigliere Stefano "Steve the Truck Driver" Vitabile discovered in 1992 that his family's underboss, John "Johnny Boy" D'Amato, was bisexual, Vitabile ordered him killed. Paul Gulino, a drug dealer and associate of the Bonanno crime family, was murdered in 1993 after he allegedly "put hands" on his family's consigliere Anthony Spero.
