= Franzese =

Franzese is an Italian surname. It is a version of Francese, meaning 'Frenchman'. This surname originates from the region of Campania.

Notable persons with that name include:

- Daniel Franzese (born 1978), American actor
- Francesco Franzese (born 1981), Italian football goalkeeper
- John Franzese (1917–2020), Italian-American gangster
- John Franzese Jr., American gangster, son of John
- Michael Franzese (born 1951), American gangster and motivational speaker, son of John
- Paula Franzese, American legal scholar
