= Cris Carter =

American football player (born 1965)

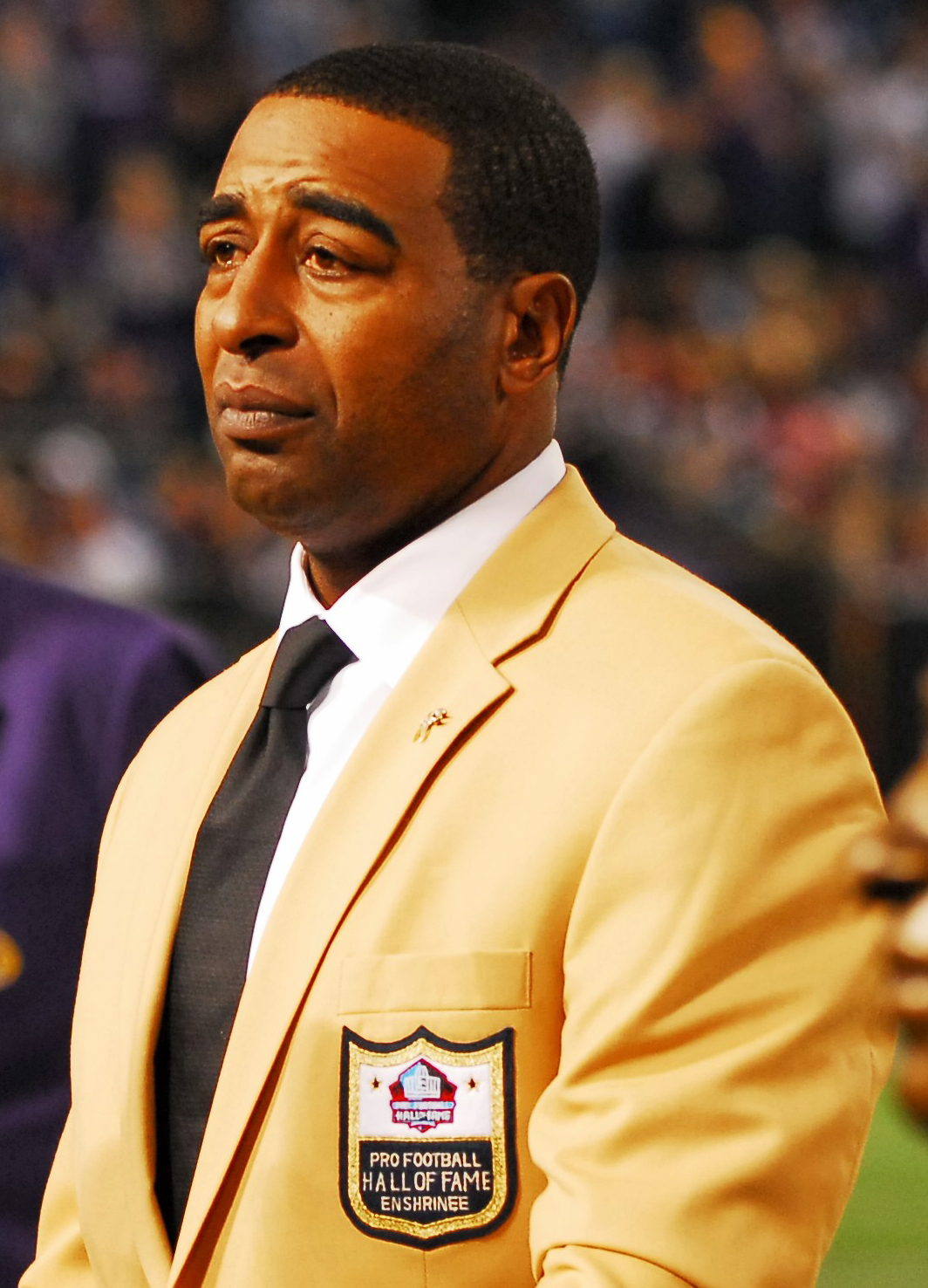
- Carter in 2014

Florida Atlantic Owls
- Title: Executive director of player engagement

Personal information
- Born: November 25, 1965 (age 60); Troy, Ohio, U.S.
- Listed height: 6 ft 3 in (1.91 m)
- Listed weight: 202 lb (92 kg)

Career information
- Position: Wide receiver (No. 80, 88)
- High school: Middletown (Middletown, Ohio)
- College: Ohio State (1984–1986)
- Supplemental draft: 1987: 4th round

Career history

Playing
- Philadelphia Eagles (1987–1989); Minnesota Vikings (1990–2001); Miami Dolphins (2002)

Coaching
- Florida Atlantic (2023) Volunteer coach

Operations
- Florida Atlantic (2024–present) Executive director of player engagement

Awards and highlights
- Walter Payton NFL Man of the Year (1999); 2× First-team All-Pro (1994, 1999); Second-team All-Pro (1995); 8× Pro Bowl (1993–2000); NFL receptions leader (1994); 3× NFL receiving touchdowns leader (1995, 1997, 1999); NFL 1990s All-Decade Team; Minnesota Vikings Ring of Honor; Minnesota Vikings No. 80 retired; Consensus All-American (1986); 2× First-team All-Big Ten (1985, 1986)

Career NFL statistics
- Receptions: 1,101
- Receiving yards: 13,899
- Receiving touchdowns: 130
- Stats at Pro Football Reference
- Pro Football Hall of Fame

Graduel Christopher Darwin Carter (born November 25, 1965) is an American former professional football wide receiver who played in the National Football League (NFL) for the Philadelphia Eagles (1987–1989), the Minnesota Vikings (1990–2001) and the Miami Dolphins (2002). He is widely regarded as one of the greatest wide receivers of all time.

Carter played college football for the Ohio State Buckeyes and was selected by the Eagles in the fourth round of the 1987 NFL supplemental draft. While in Philadelphia, head coach Buddy Ryan helped to coin one of ESPN's Chris Berman's famous quotes about Carter: "All he does is catch touchdowns." He was let go by Ryan in 1989, however, due to off-the-field issues. Carter was signed by the Vikings and turned his life and career around, becoming a two-time first-team and one-time second-team All-Pro and playing in eight consecutive Pro Bowls. When he left the Vikings after 2001, he held most of the team career receiving records. He briefly played for the Dolphins in 2002 before retiring.

Since retiring from the NFL, Carter has worked on HBO's Inside the NFL, ESPN's Sunday NFL Countdown and Monday Night Countdown, and online at Yahoo Sports. He also works as an assistant coach at St. Thomas Aquinas High School, where his son played wide receiver. In 2017, Carter began co-hosting First Things First with Nick Wright on FS1. He was terminated from the show following a suspension and investigation in 2019. Carter resides in Boca Raton, Florida. He is the younger brother of former NBA player and coach Butch Carter.

After six years, and five finalist selections, Carter was voted to the Pro Football Hall of Fame on February 2, 2013.

== Early life ==
Carter was born in Troy, Ohio. For elementary school he went to Heywood Elementary in Troy, Ohio. He spent his early childhood there before moving to Middletown, Ohio, with his mother, three brothers, and two sisters. They lived in a small four-bedroom apartment. He attended Middletown High School and starred in both football and basketball.

Named after his grandfather, Graduel, Carter dropped his birth name and unofficially changed his name to Cris after wide receiver Cris Collinsworth (whom he idolized), stating that he would never be famous with the name Graduel. According to Carter on ESPN Radio's "Mike & Mike" (on September 15, 2014), he dropped the name during 7th grade, and his name is still listed as Christopher on official documents, including his driver's license.

== College career ==
Carter was heavily recruited out of high school for both basketball and football. He accepted the offer to attend Ohio State University from Buckeyes head coach Earle Bruce. Carter became a consensus All-American selection after his junior season, Ohio State's first All American at wide receiver.

Carter had intended to play both football and basketball at Ohio State, but decided to focus on football after making an immediate impact his freshman year. That year, he set a Rose Bowl record with nine receptions for 172 yards. In his junior season, he caught 69 passes for 1,127 yards and 11 touchdowns.

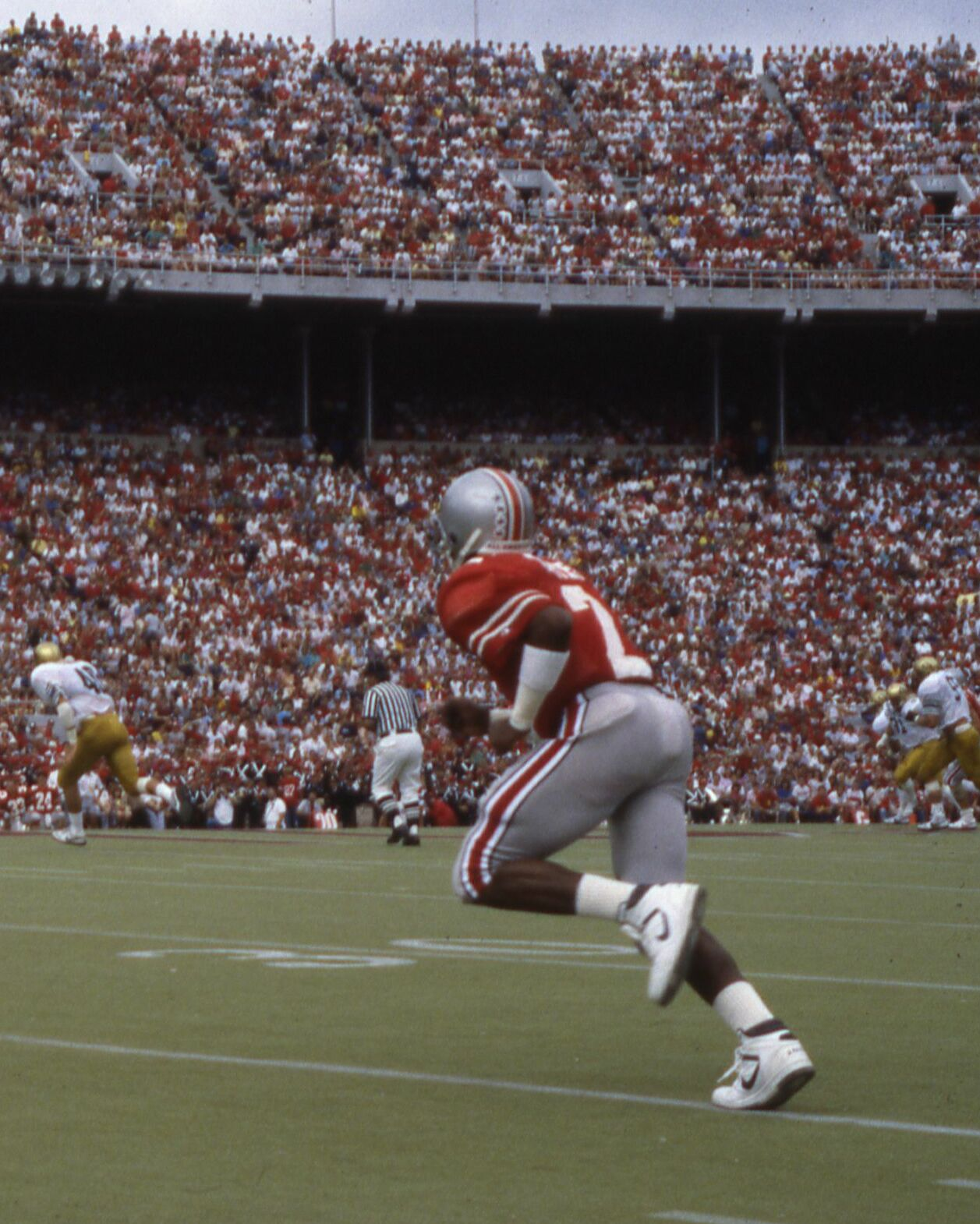
Carter at Ohio State in 1986

Carter was known for great hands, running precise routes, and for acrobatic leaps. He had remarkable body control and footwork when making catches near the sidelines. At the Citrus Bowl at the end of the 1985 season, Carter caught a ball that quarterback Jim Karsatos was intending to throw away. Karsatos has claimed that catch by Carter was the greatest in the history of college football: "When I finally saw it on film, he was tiptoeing the sidelines and he jumped up and caught the ball left-handed by the point of the football at least a yard out of bounds. Then he somehow levitated back in bounds to get both his feet in bounds. I swear to this day he actually levitated to get back in bounds. When I saw it on film, it just blew me away."

Prior to Carter's senior season, he secretly signed with notorious sports agent Norby Walters. When the contract was discovered, Carter was ruled ineligible. The absence of Carter in the 1987 offense contributed to a disappointing 6–4–1 season and the firing of Coach Bruce. Missing this season also cost him a chance at evening his personal record against Michigan; Carter finished 1–2, his lone taste of victory in the series being his freshman year.

Despite losing his senior year, Carter left Ohio State holding the school record for receptions (168), gaining 2,725 yards and 27 touchdowns from them. In 2000, he was selected as a member of the Ohio State Football All-Century Team. In 2003, he was inducted into the Ohio State Varsity O Hall of Fame.

== Professional career ==
=== Philadelphia Eagles ===
A fourth round pick by the Philadelphia Eagles in the 1987 supplemental draft, Carter saw limited action during his rookie season catching just 5 passes for 84 yards and 2 touchdowns. His first professional catch was a 22-yard touchdown vs. the St. Louis Cardinals.

Carter got more involved in the Eagles offense in 1988 catching 39 passes for 761 yards and tying for the team lead with 6 scoring receptions. In 1989, he became the teams' primary red zone receiver, leading the Eagles with 11 touchdown catches (3rd in the NFC) while hauling in 45 passes for 605 yards.

Shortly after, Carter had a falling out with coach Buddy Ryan and was a surprise cut following the pre-season. Carter later admitted that Ryan released him because of alcohol and drug abuse, including large amounts of ecstasy, cocaine and marijuana, and credits his former coach with helping him turn his life around as a result.

=== Minnesota Vikings ===
The Minnesota Vikings claimed the troubled wide receiver off waivers on September 4, 1990, for only $100. Stuck behind Hassan Jones and resident star receiver, Anthony Carter (no relation), Carter didn't see very many passes come his way during his first season in Minnesota. He did gain a measure of revenge against his former team, however, catching six passes for 151 yards, including a 78-yard touchdown, in a Monday Night contest at Philadelphia on October 15. Carter finished the 1990 campaign with 27 receptions for 413 yards and 3 touchdowns.

In 1991, Carter stepped forward as Minnesota's top pass catcher. He led the team with 72 receptions, 962 yards, and 5 touchdown catches. The winds of change were blowing in Minnesota; after a second straight disappointing season head coach Jerry Burns retired. Stanford head coach Dennis Green was named as his replacement on January 10, 1992, and began a house cleaning process. "The New Sheriff in Town" released stalwarts like running back Herschel Walker and quarterback Wade Wilson and traded defensive tackle Keith Millard to the Seattle Seahawks.

The Vikings returned to NFL prominence in 1992, posting an 11–5 record and capturing their first NFC Central Division title since 1989. With Rich Gannon and Sean Salisbury alternating at QB, Carter remained the team's primary aerial weapon—leading the team with 53 receptions, 681 yards, and 6 touchdowns despite missing the final four games of the season with a broken collar bone. The Vikings season ended in disappointment, however, as the defending Super Bowl champions Washington Redskins upended them 24–7 in the Wild Card round.

In 1993, veteran quarterback Jim McMahon acted as the team's primary signal-caller and Carter had a breakout season. He posted career highs in receptions, 86, and yards, 1,071, while catching 9 touchdowns — all team highs, and appeared in his first Pro Bowl. The Vikings finished the season 9–7, good enough for a playoff berth, but fell 17–10 to the New York Giants in the Wild Card round.

Veteran quarterback Warren Moon was acquired before the 1994 season and immediately developed a rapport with Carter. The veteran helped Carter set the NFL single-season record for receptions with 122 (the record was broken in 1995 by Detroit's Herman Moore). Carter also led the team with 1,256 yards and 7 receiving touchdowns, which earned him First-team All Pro honors. Moon and Carter carried the team to a 10–6 record and the NFC Central title, but couldn't stop the Vikings from a third straight first-round playoff exit — a 35–18 home loss to the Chicago Bears.

Carter teamed up with Moon in 1995 to post his finest statistical season. He caught 122 passes for a career-high 1,371 yards and led the NFL with 17 touchdown receptions. Carter received Second-team All Pro honors for his efforts. The Vikings, however, finished 8–8 and missed the playoffs for the first time under Green.

Midway through the 1996 season Brad Johnson took over at quarterback for the Vikings. Carter didn't miss a beat, catching 96 passes for 1,163 yards and 10 touchdowns. The Vikings returned to the playoffs with a 9–7 record, but were routed by the Dallas Cowboys 40–15 in the Wild Card round. Carter appeared in his fourth straight Pro Bowl following the season.

Carter continued to be the focal point of the Vikings' offense in 1997. He was named to his fifth consecutive Pro Bowl, leading the NFL with 13 touchdown receptions while pacing the team with 89 catches and 1069 yards. Even though he had more impressive seasons statistically, 1997 may have been Carter's finest hour, as week after week he dazzled with one spectacular catch after another. With Randall Cunningham at QB (he replaced the injured Johnson late in the season) the Vikings finally broke through in the playoffs, defeating the Giants 23–22 in a last-minute miracle comeback. The playoff success was fleeting, however, as the team fell to the San Francisco 49ers 38–22 the following week.

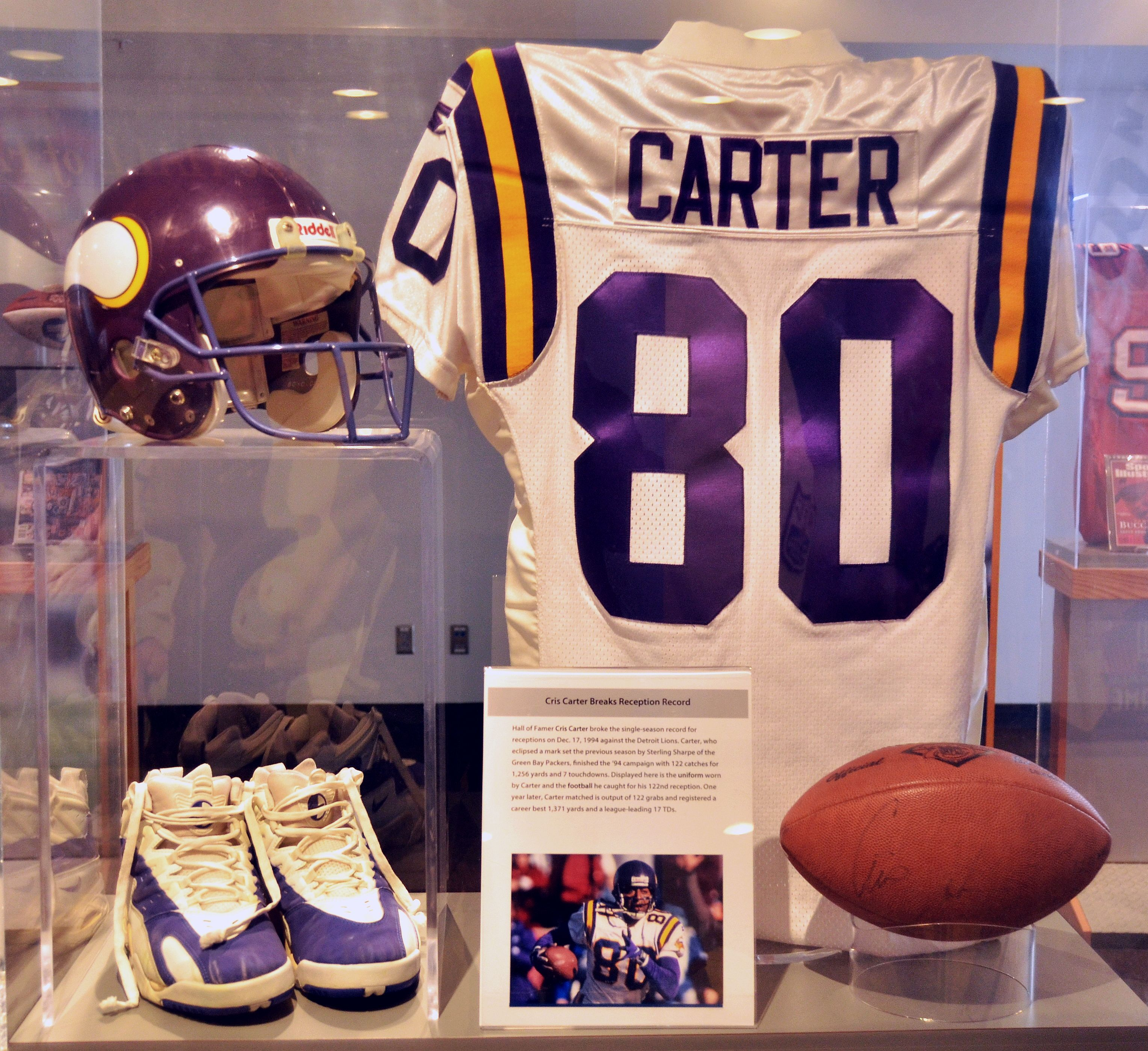
Cris Carter jersey shown at Pro Football Hall of Fame in Canton, Ohio

In 1998 the Vikings drafted Marshall wide receiver Randy Moss with 21st pick in the first round. Suddenly, the Vikings possessed the NFL's most dangerous weapon. They cruised through the regular season, posting a 15–1 record while scoring a then-league record 556 points. Carter, who made the Pro Bowl for the fifth time, caught 78 passes for 1,011 yards and 12 touchdowns. Led by Moss, Carter, and Player of the Year Randall Cunningham, the Vikings entered the playoffs as heavy favorites to reach the Super Bowl. They easily defeated the Arizona Cardinals 41–21 in the Divisional Round, advancing to the NFC Championship Game for the first time since 1987. The Vikings entered that game as 13 and a half point favorites over the Atlanta Falcons, but lost in overtime 30–27 to become the biggest favorite to ever lose a home playoff game. Carter later said losing that game was the lone regret of his time in Minnesota, and that he didn't even know if he wanted to play any more afterwards.

The following year, Carter had his finest individual season since 1995— the First-team All Pro caught 90 passes for 1,241 yards and an NFL-best 13 touchdowns. The Vikings easily defeated the Dallas Cowboys 27–10 in the Wild Card round and headed to St. Louis to face the NFL's new hottest offense. Minnesota led the eventual Super Bowl champions 17–14 at the half, but a second-half flurry led to a 49–37 Rams win.

Carter finished the decade of the '90s with 835 receptions, second only to Jerry Rice's 860, and was named to the NFL's All Decade team.

In 2000, led by Daunte Culpepper, the Vikings won the NFC Central division, and Carter finished the season with 96 receptions, 1,274 yards, 9 touchdowns, and an eighth Pro Bowl. On November 30, Carter became only the second player in NFL history to reach the 1,000 reception plateau when he caught a 4-yard touchdown pass against Detroit.

In 2001, the Vikings floundered with a record of 5–11, their first losing season since 1990. Carter's production dipped to its lowest point since 1992 (mostly because of quarterback Spergon Wynn's ineffectiveness in the last three games) — 73 catches, 871 yards, 6 touchdowns — and his streak of eight straight Pro Bowls came to an end. Following the season, the longest-tenured Viking exercised an out clause in his contract that ended his career in Minnesota.

Cris Carter left the Vikings as their all-time leader in, among other things, receptions (1,004), receiving yards (12,383), and touchdowns (110).

=== Miami Dolphins ===
Carter spent the spring of 2002 looking for a team. Although he talked with the Rams, Browns, and Dolphins, he was unable to complete a deal and joined HBO's Inside the NFL team as an analyst on May 21. He served in that capacity until October 21 when the Miami Dolphins lured the veteran back onto the playing field to bolster their injury-riddled receiving corps.

The Boca Raton resident started in his first game as a Dolphin at Lambeau Field in week 9. Carter showed signs of rust, catching just three passes for 31 yards and fumbling once. During the week that followed, he checked into the hospital with a kidney ailment and was sidelined for the next four weeks.

Carter returned in week 14, but struggled to get back into the Dolphins receiver rotation. In week 15, however, he caught a one-handed touchdown pass as the Dolphins beat the Raiders 23–17. The following week against the Vikings, however, he made a key drop in the end zone that cost Miami a touchdown. The Dolphins wound up losing that game and then lost to the Patriots the following week, missing the playoffs. Even though he put up respectable numbers for the number of games that he played, he retired after the season.

=== Legacy ===
At the time of his retirement, Carter's 1,101 career receptions and 130 touchdowns as a receiver placed him second in NFL history behind Jerry Rice, although his reception total has since been surpassed by Marvin Harrison, and his touchdown receptions by Randy Moss and Terrell Owens. Carter is one of 14 players in NFL history with 1,000 or more receptions. He was named to the NFL 1990s All-Decade Team. Carter was one of 15 finalists for the Pro Football Hall of Fame class of 2008, but was not elected in a surprise to some commentators. Carter was once again excluded in 2009 and again in 2010 as receivers Jerry Rice and Tim Brown became eligible for the first time, though Brown did not make it. Additionally, Andre Reed was another possible candidate that diminished Carter's chance for enshrinement in 2010. In 2011, he also did not make it despite not having a single wide receiver in the class.

NFL Network's NFL's Top 10 placed him atop the list of wide receivers with the best hands.

On February 2, 2013, Carter was announced as an inductee into the Hall of Fame Class of 2013 along with Bill Parcells, Larry Allen, Jonathan Ogden, Warren Sapp, Curley Culp, and Dave Robinson.

== NFL career statistics ==
Legend
	Led the league
**Bold**	Career high

General				Receiving					
Year	Team	GP	GS	Tgt	Rec	Yards	Y/R	Y/G	TD
1987	PHI	9	0	— (Note: Data for the Targets statistic prior to the 1992 season is missing from the Pro Football Reference.)	5	84	16.8	9.3	2
1988	PHI	16	16	—	39	761	**19.5**	47.6	6
1989	PHI	16	15	—	45	605	13.4	37.8	11
1990	MIN	16	5	—	27	413	15.3	25.8	3
1991	MIN	16	16	—	72	962	13.4	60.1	5
1992	MIN	12	12	92	53	681	12.8	56.8	6
1993	MIN	16	16	143	86	1,071	12.5	66.9	9
1994	MIN	16	16	188	**122**	1,256	10.3	78.5	7
1995	MIN	16	16	**197**	**122**	**1,371**	11.2	**85.7**	**17**
1996	MIN	16	16	167	96	1,163	12.1	72.7	10
1997	MIN	16	16	158	89	1,069	12.0	66.8	13
1998	MIN	16	16	125	78	1,011	13.0	63.2	12
1999	MIN	16	16	137	90	1,241	13.8	77.6	13
2000	MIN	16	16	161	96	1,274	13.3	79.6	9
2001	MIN	16	16	130	73	871	11.9	54.4	6
2002	MIA	5	1	17	8	66	8.3	13.2	1
Career		234	209	1,515	1,101	13,899	12.6	59.4	130

== Career highlights ==
=== Awards and honors ===
NFL

- Walter Payton NFL Man of the Year (1999)
- 2× First-team All-Pro (1994, 1999)
- Second-team All-Pro (1995)
- 8× Pro Bowl (1993–2000)
- NFL receptions leader (1994)
- 3× NFL receiving touchdowns leader (1995, 1997, 1999)
- NFL 1990s All-Decade Team
- Minnesota Vikings Ring of Honor
- Minnesota Vikings No. 80 retired
- Bart Starr Award (1995)
- Pro Football Hall of Fame (2013)

College

- Consensus All-American (1986)
- 2× First-team All-Big Ten (1985, 1986)
- Florida Citrus Bowl champion (1985)
- Cotton Bowl champion (1987)

=== Milestones ===
- One of four players to record at least 120 receptions in a season twice, 1994 and 1995 (Wes Welker, Antonio Brown, Michael Thomas)
- Most games with at least 12 receptions in a single season (4) in 1995
- One of three players (Clarke Gaines and Jerry Rice) to record at least 12 receptions in consecutive games
- Most consecutive games with 2 touchdown receptions (4) – tied with Calvin Johnson and Doug Baldwin
- Most consecutive seasons with at least 5 touchdown receptions, 1991–2001 (11) – Terrell Owens, Jerry Rice, Marvin Harrison, Don Hutson, and Tim Brown
- Most consecutive seasons with at least 5 touchdowns, 1991–2001 (11) – Terrell Owens, Jerry Rice, Marvin Harrison, Don Hutson, Tim Brown, and Frank Gore
- First player to record a 150-yard receiving game in three different decades (Jerry Rice is the only other player to do so)

== After football ==
Carter was one of the hosts of HBO's Inside the NFL and also was an NFL Analyst for Yahoo Sports and ESPN. He is also a faculty member and assistant coach at St. Thomas Aquinas High School, where his son played wide receiver in 2008. He is the owner of Cris Carter's FAST Program, a sports training center in South Florida and is an ordained minister. He also appeared in the 2005 sports video game NFL Street 2 as a wide receiver for the NFL Gridiron Legends team along with former teammate, safety Joey Browner, and a few other historical NFL legends.

Carter was a speaker at the 2008 NFL rookie symposium and again at the 2009 NFL Rookie Symposium. He also spoke at the 2014 NFL rookie symposium, where he encouraged players to get a fall guy they can trust to take the blame if they get in trouble. The comments were revealed in 2015 in an ESPN The Magazine story about Chris Borland. The NFL took the video of the speech down from its website and released a statement saying in part: "The comment was not representative of the message of the symposium or any other league program...The comment was not repeated in the 2014 AFC session or this year's symposium." Carter apologized on Twitter, saying he realized it was bad advice, and everyone should take responsibility for their own actions. ESPN also released a statement saying Carter's comments do not reflect the company's views.

Carter was chosen to be a coach for a team in the 2015 Pro Bowl, along with former Dallas Cowboys wide receiver Michael Irvin.

In December 2016, Carter was hired by Fox Sports as a football analyst. In May 2017, his role was expanded as it was announced that Carter would co-host a morning show, First Things First, on Fox Sports 1 with radio personality Nick Wright and moderator Jenna Wolfe. The show premiered on September 5, 2017. His tenure ended in November 2019 following a suspension.

Since 2021 he has been part of Good Morning Football as an analyst. He was the only guest on Good Morning Football to get the ball on the peg during The Long Show on February 2, 2022.

In fall 2023, Carter joined Florida Atlantic under head coach Tom Herman as a volunteer coach. Following the season he was promoted to executive director of player engagement.
