= Francese =

Francese is an Italian surname meaning "French". Notable people with this surname include:

- Angela Francese (1950–2025), Italian politician
- Antonio Francese (1899–1979), Uruguayan Army general and politician of Italian descent
- Mario Francese (1925–1979), Italian crime reporter
- Paula Francese, American politician
- Peter Francese (born 1941), American demographic trends expert and writer of Italian descent

== See also ==
- Francese Litchfield Turnbull (1844–1927), an American female novelist
- Chicken Francese, an Italian-American chicken dish
- Franzese, a similar Italian surname
