= 1988 in organized crime =

In 1988, a number of events took place in organized crime.

== Events ==
- Genovese crime family member Vincent "Vinnie" DiNapoli, then considered by federal authorities to be the tenth most influential U.S. mobster, is convicted on racketeering charges and sentenced to twenty-four years' imprisonment.
- Armond "Buddy" Dellacroce, drug trafficker and son of Gambino crime family underboss Aniello Dellacroce, dies from a drug overdose.
- Daniel Sciacca, brother of New Jersey Teamster's President Michael Sciacca (an associate of Anthony Provenzano), succeeds his brother as head of the Genovese crime family-controlled Teamsters Local 560.
- The Albanian Boys, an Albanian American gang, is established in Pelham Parkway, Bronx, New York City The gang's founder, Sekret Kukaj, is shot dead on October 26, 1988.
- January 4 – DeCavalcante crime family capo, Vincent "Jimmy" Rotondo is shot to death outside his Brooklyn home shortly before his alleged promotion to underboss.
- January 12 – Giuseppe Insalaco, former mayor of Palermo is killed. During the brief stint as mayor in 1984 he had tried to clean up the area of city contracts. Now that the moratorium on violence observed during the Maxi Trial had lapsed, Insalaco was killed.
- February 23 – Gambino crime family underboss Joseph Armone was sentenced to 15 years in prison and fined $820,000 for participating in a racketeering scheme involving extortion and bribery.
- March 19 – Antimafia judge Giovanni Falcone issues 160 arrest warrants on the basis of the testimony of Antonino Calderone, brother of the former Mafia boss of Catania, Giuseppe Calderone.
- April – Sports agent Norby Walters, reportedly an associate of Michael Franzese, is convicted of fraud and racketeering after signing college players to professional teams before their eligibility expired.
- April 17 – Gambino Captain Anthony Gaggi dies of natural causes while being housed at New York's Metropolitan Correctional Center.
- May 5 – Genovese crime family front boss Anthony Salerno was found guilty of racketeering and bid rigging in the construction industry. Also convicted were Genovese crime family captains Vincent "Vinnie" DiNapoli and Matthew "Matty the Horse" Ianniello, and Lucchese crime family captain Aniello Migliore.
- May 12 – Gambino crime family associate George Yudzevich, who testified against Gambino underboss Joseph Armone in his racketeering trial, was found shot to death in California.
- May 16 – Los Angeles LCN boss Peter J. Milano was sentenced to 6 years in prison on federal racketeering charges. Milano's brother Carmen Milano, the underboss of the family, was sentenced to 2 years for his role in the family's extortion activity which involved levying a street tax on Southern California bookmakers, loansharks and drug dealers. Also convicted in the case were caporegimes Vincent Caci and Luigi Gelfuso, Jr. and soldiers Stephen Cino and Rocco Zangari.
- June 29 – Genovese crime family consigliere Louis Manna was indicted for conspiring to kill Gambino Family boss John Gotti and his brother Gene.
- August 26 – The longest criminal case in federal history officially comes to an end. In United States v. Anthony Accetturo et al., twenty members of the Lucchese Family New Jersey faction, headed by Anthony Accetturo and Michael "Mad Dog" Taccetta, were found not guilty on all charges.
- August 29 – New York mobster Wilfred "Willy Boy" Johnson is murdered after almost two decades as a government informant.
- September 25 – Judge Antonino Saetta is killed with one of his sons as they are returning to Palermo after a weekend in the country. Saetta was a president of the Palermo Court of Appeal and was scheduled to hear the appeal of the Maxi Trial and had shown to be incorruptible.
- September 26 – Mauro Rostagno, a former student radical of Lotta Continua and journalist who had started a drug rehabilitation centre in Sicily, is killed. Rostagno courageously denounced Mafia drug traffickers on local television.
- September 28 – Giovanni Bontade, the brother of murdered Mafia boss Stefano Bontade, and his wife are killed at their home. Giovanni Bontade had been spared during the Second Mafia War by allying himself with the Corleonesi against his older brother.
- October 11 – Graeme Jensen is shot dead by Victorian Police officers whilst visiting a lawnmower repair store. Jensen, a friend of Victorian underworld figure Victor Peirce, was under observation by the Victoria Police Armed Robbery Squad for a suspected murder.
- November
  - Nicodemo Scarfo, head of the Philadelphia-South New Jersey crime family (including Atlantic City), is convicted of murder and conspiracy.
  - Over 17 Philadelphia mobsters are convicted in a large scale federal racketeering investigation including Wayne Grande, Francis Iannarella Jr., Lawrence Merlino, Frank Narducci, Jr., Anthony Pungitore, Jr., Nicholas Virgileo, Ralph Staino, Joseph Ciancaglini and Scarfo crime family underboss (as well as nephew of Nicodemo Scarfo) Philip Leonetti are convicted of racketeering and conspiracy charges. One of the defendants, Scarfo crime family soldier Eugene Milano, would later become a government informant and would testify against 8 other former Scarfo associate (including his own brother Nicholas Milano) in the 1985 gangland murder of Bruno-Testa member Frank D'Afonso.
  - Stephen Maltese, reportedly a member of the Genovese crime family, is charged and later convicted of racketeering and murder and sentenced to twenty years' imprisonment.
- December 12 – Anthony Provenzano, at the age of 71, dies of a heart attack at a federal penitentiary in Lompoc, California while serving a 20-year prison sentence for labor racketeering.
- December 15 – Lucchese crime family soldiers Peter Vario, Michael LaBarbera, Jr., and James Abbatiello were indicted for controlling the concrete industry on Long Island through their positions and influence in Local 66 of the Laborers' International Union of North America.
- December 24 – John Gotti Jr. and Michael 'Mikey Scars' DiLeonardo are made, or officially inducted, into the Gambino Family.

== Arts and literature ==
- As Tears Go By (film) starring Andy Lau, Maggie Cheung and Jacky Cheung
- Barlow and Chambers: A Long Way From Home (television miniseries) starring Julie Christie, Hugo Weaving, John Polson and Sarah Jessica Parker
- Married to the Mob (film) starring Alec Baldwin, Michelle Pfeiffer and Joan Cusack

== Deaths ==
- Armond Dellacroce "Buddy", drug trafficker and son of Gambino crime family underboss Aniello Dellacroce.
- April 17 – Anthony Gaggi "Nino", former capo in the Gambino Family.
- August 29 – Wilfred Johnson "Willy Boy", New York mobster and government informant.
- December 12 – Anthony Provenzano (Tony Pro) New York mobster and labor racketeer.
