= Paula Francese =

American politician

Member of New Hampshire House of Representatives for Rockingham 18
- In office 2014–2018

Personal details
- Party: Democratic

Paula Francese is an American politician. She was a member of the New Hampshire House of Representatives and represented Rockingham's 18th district.

In 1989, she and her husband moved to New Hampshire from Ithaca, New York.
