= Sonny Franzese =

Italian-American mobster (1917–2020)

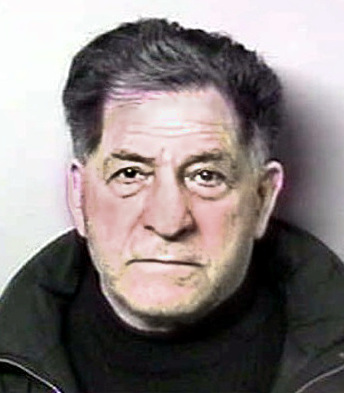
- Undated mugshot of Franzese
- Born: John Franzese; February 6, 1917; Naples, Campania, Italy
- Died: February 24, 2020 (aged 103); New York City, U.S.
- Resting place: St. John Cemetery, New York City, U.S.
- Occupation: Mobster
- Spouse: Cristina Capobianco-Franzese (second wife)
- Children: 8, including Michael Franzese and John Franzese Jr.
- Allegiance: Colombo crime family
- Convictions: Bank robbery (1967); Racketeering, Extortion (2011)
- Penalty: 50 years' imprisonment (1970); Eight years' imprisonment (2011)

John "Sonny" Franzese Sr. (Italian: [ˈfrantseːze; -eːse]; February 6, 1917 – February 24, 2020) was an American mobster who was a longtime member and former underboss of the Colombo crime family.

Franzese's career in organized crime began in the 1930s and spanned over eight decades. He served as underboss of the Colombo family from 1963 until 1967, when he was sentenced to 50 years in prison for orchestrating a number of bank robberies across the country. He was paroled in 1978. He was re-jailed at least six times on parole violations in the decades that followed. He became Colombo family underboss again in 2004.

He was convicted of extortion in 2011, and sentenced to eight years in prison. His son John Franzese Jr. testified against him, becoming the first son of a New York mobster to turn state's evidence and testify against his father. At the time of his release on June 23, 2017, at the age of 100, he was the oldest federal inmate in the United States and the only centenarian in federal custody. He died in a New York City hospital on February 24, 2020, at the age of 103.

== Early life ==
John “Sonny” Franzese Sr. was born on February 6, 1917 (although one source says 1919), in Naples, Italy, to Carmine “Tutti the Lion” Franzese and Maria Franzese (née Corvola). His parents had already immigrated to the United States at the time of his birth, but were back in Italy on a boat trip. Shortly afterwards, Franzese’s parents returned with him to their home in Greenpoint, Brooklyn, where his father ran a bakery. His mother gave him the nickname "Sonny" at a young age, and it was used for his entire life. Franzese was the youngest son in a family of nineteen children—four sons and fifteen daughters.

During his youth, Franzese was an amateur boxer. He attended Eastern District High School in Brooklyn but was expelled at the age of 15 after he knocked out another boy in a brawl over a stolen cigarette lighter. After that, Franzese worked at his father’s bakery for a short period of time, before getting involved in criminal activity such as street fighting, theft, and illegal gambling.

== Rise in the Colombo crime family ==
In the late 1930s, Franzese became an associate of the Profaci crime family, headed by Joseph Profaci. He served in the crew of Sebastian “Buster” Aloi. His first arrest came in 1938, for assault. In 1942, during the midst of World War II, Franzese was drafted into the U.S. Army, but was discharged in 1944, classified as "psychoneurotic with pronounced homicidal tendencies". He later claimed this was a misunderstanding, stating he simply wanted to “kill the enemy” rather than handle kitchen duties. Court papers accused him of committing rape against a waitress in 1947, but he was never arrested in relation to the crime.

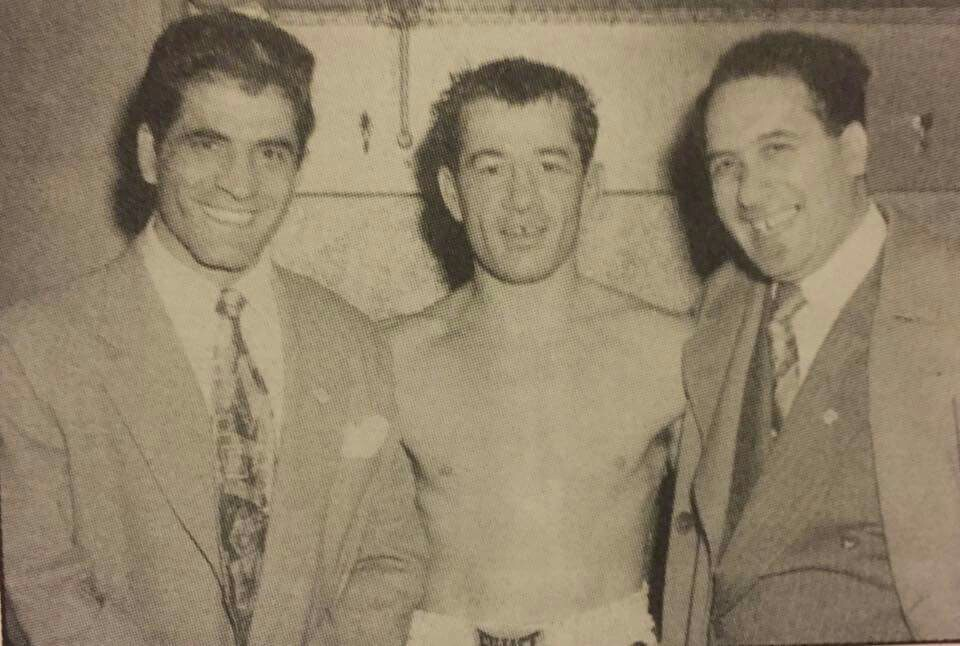
Franzese (left) with boxer Rocky Graziano (center) and Sebastian Aloi (right) in the 1940s

Franzese operated out of New York City and New Jersey and was involved in racketeering, fraud, bookmaking, loansharking, extortion, and murder. It is believed that he became a made man in 1950, a caporegime or captain, in the mid 1950s, and when Joseph Colombo became the new boss of the family in 1963, he was promoted to underboss of the Colombo crime family. In the 1950s and 1960s, Franzese listed his official occupation as an owner of a dry-cleaning store in Brooklyn.

Franzese was a regular at the Copacabana and other popular New York City nightclubs. He met celebrities like Frank Sinatra, Sammy Davis Jr., Dean Martin, and Bobby Darin on a frequent basis. Franzese claimed to have had affairs with various celebrity women including, Marilyn Monroe, Jayne Mansfield, and Diahann Carroll. Franzese had an interest in professional boxing—particularly Rocky Graziano and Jake LaMotta.

In 1967, Franzese gained a financial interest in a new recording company, Buddah Records. He used Buddah to launder illegal mob earnings and to bribe disc jockeys with payola. He also infiltrated and began to make money through the owner of Calla Records, Nate McCalla, until the recording label ceased operations in 1977, and McCalla was murdered execution style in 1980.

== Trial and conviction ==
He was accused of murdering Genovese crime family hitman-turned-informant Ernest Rupolo in 1964 on the orders of Vito Genovese. Rupolo was shot and stabbed several times before his feet were attached to two concrete blocks and his hands tied before being dumped into Jamaica Bay. He was arrested with nine other people on April 13, 1966, and during his trial, the prosecution produced records that claimed that Franzese had killed between 30 and 50 people. Franzese was later acquitted of the murder.

However, on March 3, 1967, Franzese was convicted in Albany, New York of masterminding a series of four bank robberies across the country in 1965, and was finally sentenced to 50 years in prison at United States Penitentiary, Leavenworth, by judge Jacob Mishler in 1970, after several denied appeals. His son, Michael, alleged that when Mishler sentenced his father, Franzese declared, "You watch. I'm gonna do the whole 50".

Franzese's nephew Salvatore reportedly headed his gambling operations while he was in prison. In 1978, Franzese was released on parole but returned to prison in 1982 for a parole violation. In 1984, Franzese was released on parole again. Until 2008, he was never charged with another crime, although he would return to prison on parole violations on at least six occasions.

== Workshop on murder ==
In 2006, Franzese discussed techniques for mob murders with Gaetano "Guy" Fatato, a Colombo associate, not realizing that Fatato was a government informant and taping the conversation. Franzese told Fatato:

I killed a lot of guys – you're not talking about four, five, six, ten.

Franzese also told Fatato that he put nail polish on his fingertips before a murder to avoid leaving fingerprints at the crime scene. Franzese also suggested wearing a hairnet during the murder so as to avoid leaving any hair strands at the crime scene that could be DNA analyzed.

Finally, Franzese stressed the importance of properly dealing with the corpse. His procedure was to dismember the corpse in a kiddie pool, dry the severed body parts in a microwave oven, and then run the parts through a commercial-grade garbage disposal. Franzese observed:

Today, you can't have a body no more ... It's better to take that half-an-hour, an hour, to get rid of the body than it is to leave the body on the street.

== Indictments and final sentence ==
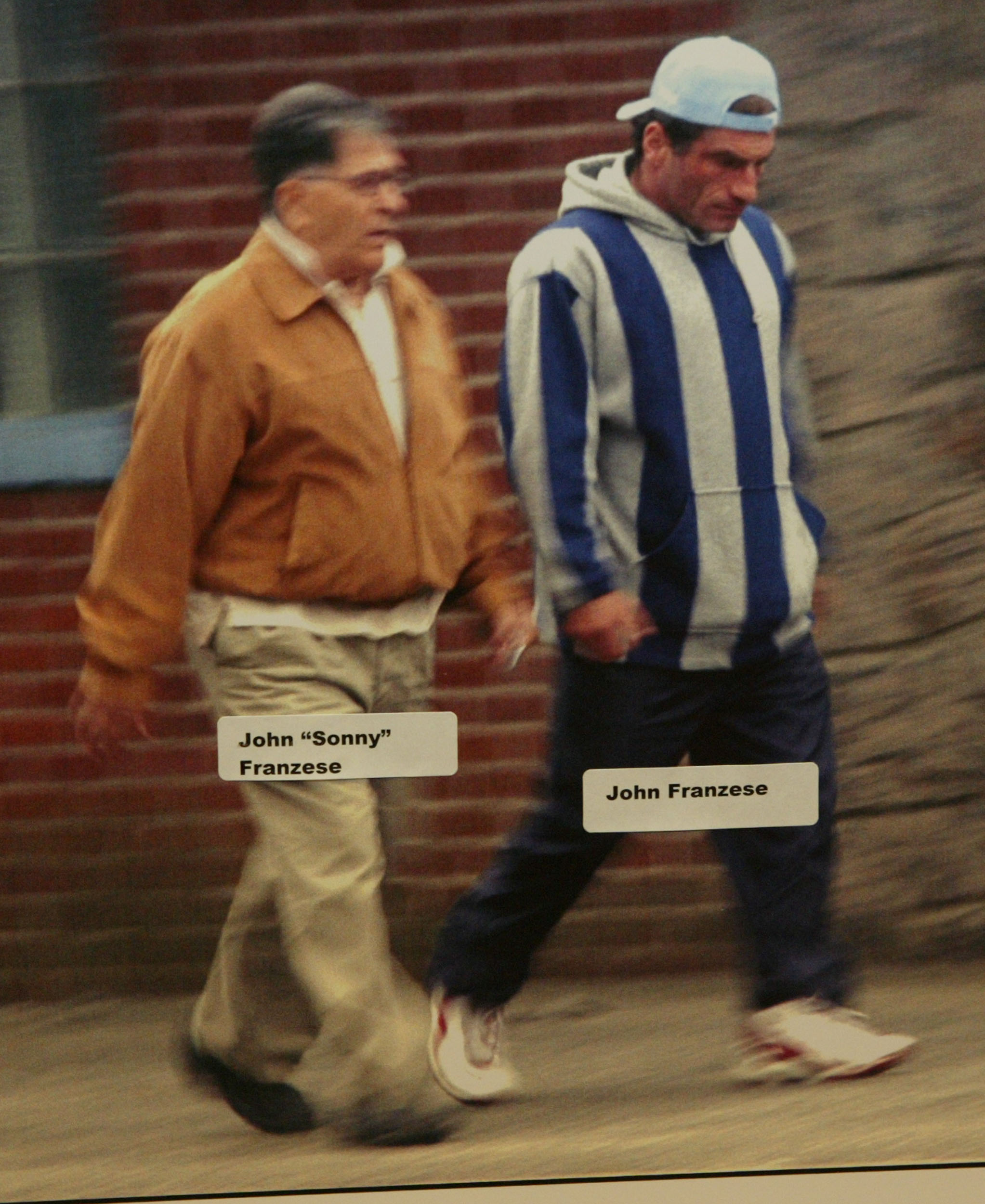
FBI surveillance photo of Franzese and his son John Franzese Jr. in 2005

After the 2004 incarceration of John "Jackie" DeRoss, Franzese was again promoted to Colombo family underboss in 2005, for the first time since his 1967 imprisonment, by Thomas Gioeli. However, in May 2007, Franzese was again returned to prison for a parole violation. In June 2008, Franzese, still incarcerated, was indicted on charges of participating in murders during the Colombo Wars of the early 1990s, stealing fur coats in New York City in the mid-1990s, and participating in home invasions by police impersonators in Los Angeles in 2006.

On June 4, 2008, Franzese was indicted along with other Colombo mobsters on charges of racketeering, conspiracy, robbery, extortion, narcotics trafficking, and loansharking. On December 24, 2008, Franzese was released from the Metropolitan Detention Center in Brooklyn. According to law enforcement, Franzese remained the official underboss of the Colombo family.

Franzese's son, John Franzese Jr., became a government informant. Franzese Jr. was allegedly also responsible for his father's fourth parole violation, but was accepted back into his confidence after denying the allegations in tears, saying, "I would never do that, no matter what kind of trouble I had." In 2005, Franzese Jr. wore a wire around his father. John Franzese Jr. testified twice against his father, the last time his father attempted to have him killed; he later lived under witness protection. In 2010, Franzese Jr. admitted that he received $50,000 from the FBI as a cooperating witness. He is the first son of a New York mobster to turn state's evidence and testify against his father.

With the help of Franzese Jr.'s testimony, the 93-year-old Franzese Sr., on January 14, 2011, was sentenced to eight years in prison for extorting two Manhattan strip clubs, running a loanshark operation and extorting a pizzeria on Long Island. Prosecutors had asked for a sentence of 12 years, while Franzese's lawyer asked for leniency based on a variety of ailments, including partial blindness and deafness, gout, and heart and kidney problems. Franzese was denied compassionate release in July 2016. Franzese was released from the Federal Medical Center in Devens, Massachusetts, on June 23, 2017, at the age of 100; he was the oldest federal inmate in the United States and the only centenarian in federal custody at the time of his release.

== Movie business ==
Franzese is listed as an associate producer of the 2003 film This Thing of Ours, which starred James Caan. He also helped to finance the $22,000 budget of the 1972 pornographic film Deep Throat, which generated $30–50 million, and the 1974 slasher film The Texas Chain Saw Massacre, which earned over $30 million from a $80,000–140,000 investment.

== Family and death ==
In the 1940s, Franzese married a woman named Ann Schiller with whom he had three children: Maryann, Carmine, and Lorraine. In 1950, while still married, Franzese had gotten Cristina Capobianco, a 16-year-old cigarette girl at the Stork Club in Manhattan, pregnant with his son Michael Franzese. Capobianco then married another man named Frank Grillo, to avoid having a scandal surrounding having a child out of wedlock. A few years later, the mob allowed Franzese to divorce his first wife; Grillo disappeared, and he married Capobianco. Due to these events, Michael had initially believed that he had been adopted by Franzese after the disappearance of Grillo, who Michael thought to be his biological father. Franzese had four more children with Capobianco, who died in 2012. Franzese and his family settled in a two-story home in Roslyn, Long Island. Altogether, Franzese had eight children, 18 grandchildren and six great-grandchildren.

Michael Franzese had entered a pre-med program at Hofstra University in 1969, as John Franzese originally did not want him to be involved in organized crime. However, in 1971, shortly after his father had been sentenced to 50 years in prison for bank robbery, he decided to drop out of college to help his family earn money. After he was sentenced to 10 years in prison in 1986, Michael was ultimately released in 1994 and retired to California in 1995.

His younger son, John Franzese Jr., was a Colombo family associate before becoming an FBI informant. On June 23, 2017, the elder Franzese was released and returned home at age 100. In 2019, Franzese Jr. met with his father at the nursing home where he resided and reconciled with him; John Jr. had previously voluntarily left the Witness Protection Program.

Franzese died in a New York City hospital, on February 24, 2020, aged 103. He was buried on February 28, at St. John Cemetery following his funeral at Church of Our Lady of Mount Carmel.
