= Peter Francese =

American trends expert (born 1941)

- Born: February 21, 1941; Pittsfield, Massachusetts, U.S.
- Education: Cornell University
- Occupation: Demographic trends expert

Peter Francese (born February 21, 1941) is an American speaker and writer on the subject of populations and consumer trends. Francese has worked with many non-profit organizations and major American corporations, including Dow Jones & Company.

== Biography ==
Peter Francese was born in Pittsfield, Massachusetts, the son of Peter G. and Almina (née Irali) Francese. His father was an industrial building contractor, and his mother raised five children. He is married to Paula Francese (née Slowick) and they have three adult children, Christopher, Heather (Kazemi) and Justin.

He holds a bachelor's degree in physics from Washington & Lee University (1964) and earned a Bachelor's in civil engineering from Rensselaer Polytechnic Institute (1964). Francese also has a master's degree in regional planning from Cornell University (1968).

Francese served two years in the U.S. Army Corps of Engineers, including one tour of duty in Vietnam as the Executive Officer with the 617th Panel Bridge Company.

== Career ==
Francese founded American Demographics magazine in 1979, which quickly became the nation's most authoritative source on consumer trends for business leaders. American Demographics was nominated three times for a National Magazine Award and Dow Jones bought the magazine in 1985.

Francese's weekly column on demographic trends, "People Patterns", was syndicated in 50 newspapers and subsequently appeared monthly in The Wall Street Journal.

He has authored several books on how to effectively target consumer markets, including: Capturing Customers (1991); Marketing Know-How (1996); Marketing Insights to Help Your Business Grow (1998). His most recent book, Communities & Consequences II (2020), co-authored with Lorraine Stuart Merrill, was accompanied by a 60-minute film documentary by Jay Childs, available through New Hampshire PBS. The book and video analyze the aging state's social, economic and demographic challenges and how to meet the need for thriving intergenerational communities.

== Recognition ==
Francese is a recipient of the Silver Bell Award for Distinguished Public Service from the Advertising Council. He is also a recipient of the Visionary Award from the Workforce Housing Coalition of the Greater Seacoast. He served two terms on the University President's Council of Cornell University.
