= John Franzese Jr. =

American mobster

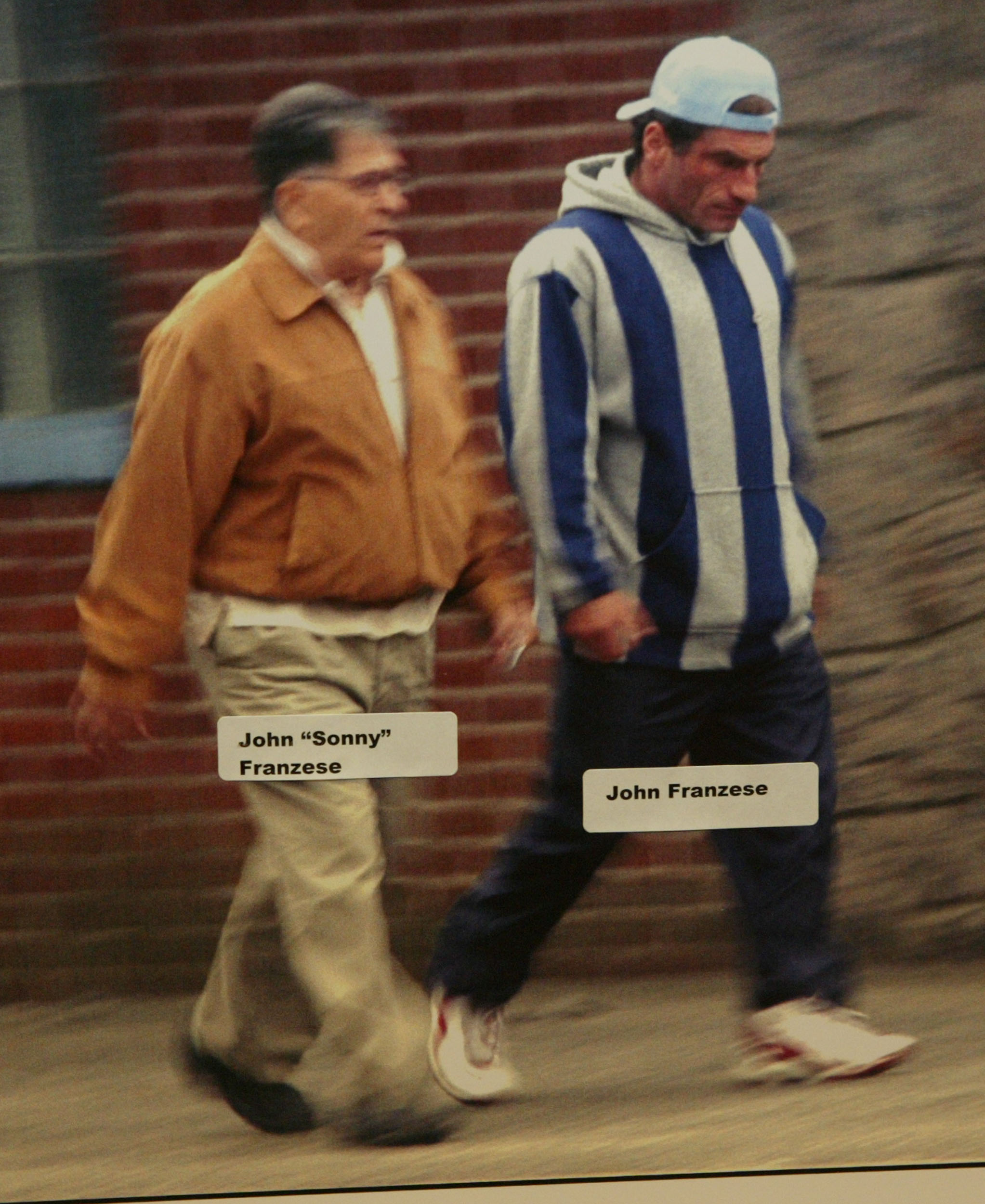
- FBI surveillance photo of Franzese and his father Sonny in 2005
- Born: April 22, 1960 (age 66)
- Other name: Mat Pazzarelli
- Occupation: Mobster
- Spouse: Denyce Franzese
- Father: John "Sonny" Franzese
- Relatives: Michael Franzese (brother)
- Allegiance: Colombo crime family

John Franzese Jr. (born April 22, 1960), now living as Mat Pazzarelli, is an American former mobster and associate of the Colombo crime family, and son of former underboss John "Sonny" Franzese. He is the first son of a New York mobster to turn state's evidence and testify against his father.

== Organized crime ==
Franzese Jr. was born into the family of Colombo underboss John Franzese. His father was charged with a series of bank robberies in the late 1960s for a total term of 50 years. His brother Michael Franzese, who eventually rose to the rank of capo, was the first person that explained the Mafia life to him two years prior to his father's first release on parole in 1978. Franzese Jr. was never a made man but was active as an associate in the 1980s before sinking into addiction, describing moving from alcohol, to cocaine to crack. In the 1990s he described himself as a junkie. It was from his drug use he acquired HIV and eventually AIDS.

== Informant ==
Franzese Jr. was approached by the FBI with a proposition that he become an informant, which he accepted. One part of the agreement he made with the FBI prior to testifying was that he would not profit from his story as a mafia figure. He was allegedly also responsible for his father's fourth parole violation, but was accepted back into his confidence after denying the allegations in tears, saying, "I would never do that, no matter what kind of trouble I had." In 2005, he wore a wire around his father. Franzese Jr. testified twice against his father, the last time his father attempted to have him killed; he later lived under witness protection. In 2010, he admitted that he received $50,000 from the FBI as a cooperating witness.

With the help of Franzese Jr.'s testimony, his father was sentenced on January 14, 2011, to eight years in prison for extorting two Manhattan strip clubs, running a loanshark operation and extorting a pizzeria on Long Island. He is the first son of a New York mobster to turn state's evidence and testify against his father.

In 2017, he was recognized by someone attending a recovery meeting and was exposed via a post on Facebook. The FBI urged him to immediately relocate but he declined and exited the Witness Protection Program in Indianapolis. In 2019, Franzese met with his father at the nursing home where he resided and reconciled with him. His father died of natural causes in New York, on February 24, 2020, at the age of 103.

== Personal life ==
His wife Denyce was featured on I Married a Mobster TV show episode "Rat Trap". He is a recovering addict living in Indianapolis encouraging others with the affliction of addiction, offering an example of what rehabilitation can look like at a special housing unit.
