= Norby Walters =

American music and sports agent (1932–2023)

- Born: Norbert Meyer; April 20, 1932; Brooklyn, New York, U.S.
- Died: December 10, 2023 (aged 91); Los Angeles, California, U.S.
- Occupations: Music and sports agent
- Years active: 1968-1987

Norby Walters (born Norbert Meyer; April 20, 1932 – December 10, 2023) was an American music and sports agent. Per The New York Times, "his father, Yosele Chezchonovitch, a Polish immigrant, served in the Army (where he changed his name to Joseph Meyer) during World War I and later became a diamond courier and the owner of a nightclub in Brooklyn and a sideshow attraction at Coney Island. His mother, Florence (Golub) Meyer, was a homemaker. 'I traveled all over the country with my father's freak shows', Mr. Walters told The Daily News of New York in 1987. 'It was all a scam. There were no freaks, the alligator boy was a poor fellow with a horrible skin condition, the girl with no body was done with mirrors, the turtle girl was a dwarf with a costume.'"

With his business partner, Lloyd Bloom, he established World Sports & Entertainment which from 1984 to 1987 signed dozens of college athletes to secret contracts that gave the agency exclusive rights to handle future negotiations with teams in the NFL.

He was convicted of mail fraud for partnering with the mafia (Michael Franzese of the Colombo crime family) to illegally sign up and pay sports players while they were still in college. Walters was sentenced to five years in prison, and his partner Lloyd Bloom was sentenced to three, although neither spent a day in prison because the convictions were overturned on appeal. Judge Frank Easterbrook wrote in his 1993 ruling that "Walters is by all accounts a nasty and untrustworthy fellow, but the prosecutor did not prove that his efforts to circumvent the N.C.A.A.'s rules amounted to mail fraud". His partner Lloyd Bloom for his part was shot to death at his home in Malibu, California, later that year.

For more than 25 years, he hosted the annual Night of 100 Stars Oscars viewing party. Walters died on December 10, 2023, at the age of 91.
