= Michael Franzese =

American mobster, motivational speaker, and media personality (born 1951)

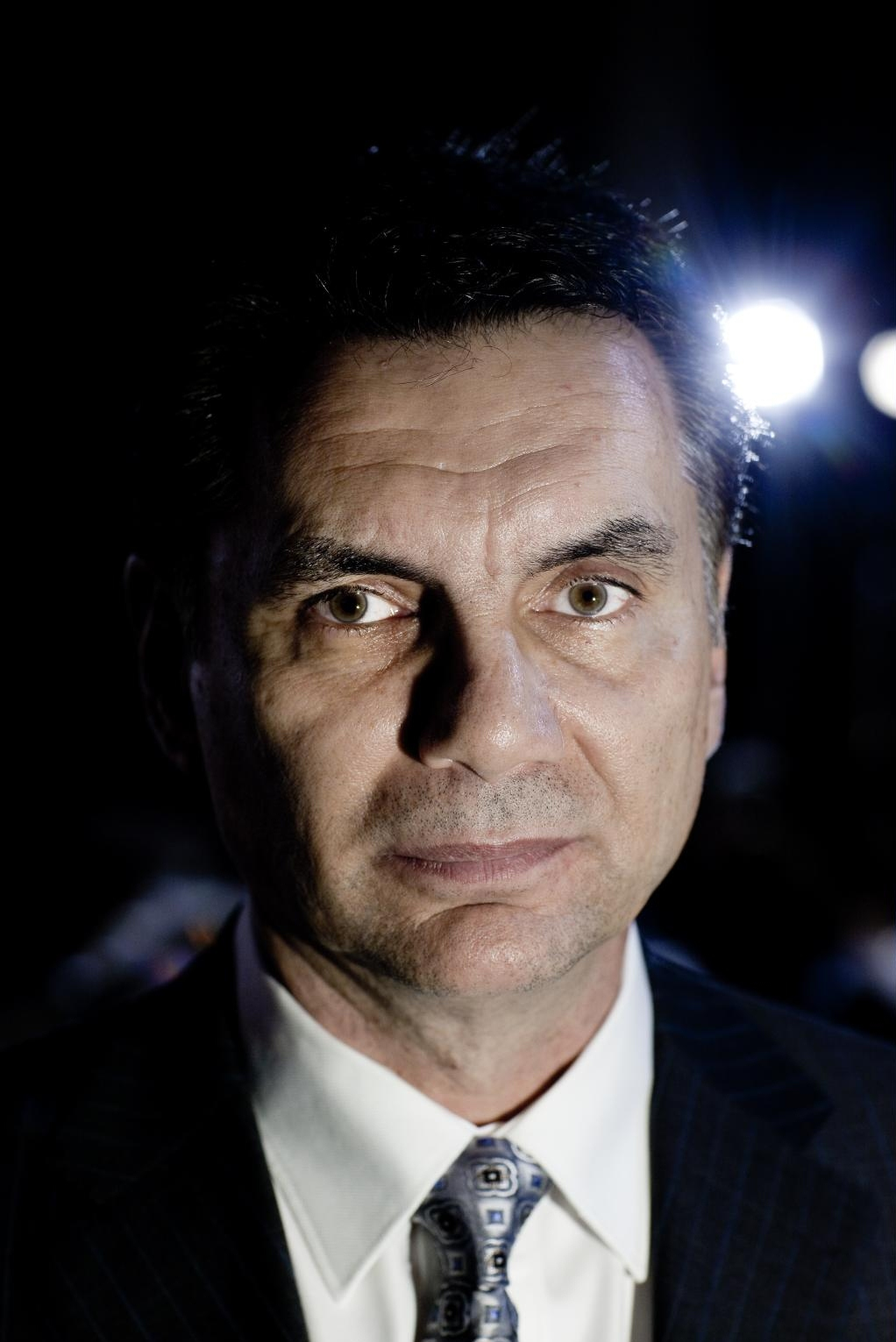
- Franzese in 2009
- Born: Michael Grillo; May 27, 1951 (age 75); Brooklyn, New York, U.S.
- Other names: "Yuppie Don" "Prince of the Mafia"
- Occupations: Mobster (former); motivational speaker; author
- Spouses: Maria Franzese (first wife); Camille Garcia (m. 1985)
- Children: 7
- Parent(s): Sonny Franzese; Cristina Capobianco-Franzese
- Relatives: John Franzese Jr. (brother)
- Allegiance: Colombo crime family (former)
- Convictions: Racketeering conspiracy, tax conspiracy (1986); Racketeering (1986)
- Penalty: 10 years' imprisonment and ordered to pay $14.7 million in restitution Nine years' imprisonment (concurrently) and ordered to pay $3 million in restitution

YouTube information
- Channel: Michael Franzese
- Years active: 2020–present
- Genres: Motivational speaking, storytelling, interviews, movie reviews, political commentary
- Subscribers: 2.0 million
- Views: 347 million
- Last updated: September 30, 2026
- Website: michaelfranzese.com

Michael Franzese Sr. (/frænˈziːs/) (né Grillo; born May 27, 1951) is an American former mobster who was a caporegime in the Colombo crime family in New York City, and son of former underboss Sonny Franzese. Franzese was enrolled in a pre-med program at Hofstra University, but dropped out to make money for his family after his father was sentenced to 50 years in prison for bank robbery in 1967. He eventually helped implement a scheme to defraud the federal government out of gasoline taxes in the early 1980s.

By the age of 35, in 1986, Fortune Magazine listed Franzese as number 18 on its list of the "Fifty Most Wealthy and Powerful Mafia Bosses". Franzese claimed that at the height of his career, he generated up to $8 million per week. In 1986, he was sentenced to 10 years in prison on conspiracy charges, released in 1989, rearrested in 1991 for a parole violation, and ultimately released in 1994. During his time in prison, Franzese became a born-again Christian. Soon after being released, he walked away from the mob and retired to California, and became a motivational speaker, commentator, and writer.

== Early life ==
Franzese was born May 27, 1951, in Brooklyn, New York, to John "Sonny" Franzese Sr, a Colombo crime family underboss, and Cristina Capobianco-Franzese, although Michael had initially questioned who his actual biological father was. Franzese had initially believed that he had been adopted by John after his mother divorced Frank Grillo, whom Franzese thought to be his biological father. Michael says he had gone by the name "Michael Grillo" until he was 18 years old.

However, it was later discovered that John, already married with three children, had gotten the 16-year-old Capobianco, a cigarette girl at the Stork Club in Manhattan, pregnant with Michael, so Capobianco married Grillo to avoid having a scandal surrounding having a child out of wedlock. After the mob allowed John to divorce his first wife, Grillo disappeared, and John married Capobianco.

Franzese later moved to Long Island. His father originally did not want him to be involved in organized crime. However, in 1971, Franzese decided to drop out of college to help his family earn money when his father was sentenced to 50 years in prison for bank robbery in 1967.

== Career in the mob ==
Franzese became acquainted with his father's friends such as Joseph Colombo, and according to Franzese, later became inducted as a made man on Halloween night 1975, under acting boss Tommy DiBella. As part of the ceremony, Franzese took the blood oath and swore omerta. He took the oath alongside friend Jimmy Angelino, Joseph Peraino Jr., Salvatore Miciotta, Vito Guzzo Sr., and John Minerva — all of whom except Miciotta died violently over the next 20 years.

Franzese was briefly mentored by Colombo soldier Joseph "Joe-Joe" Vitacco (1927–1980). During the late 1970s, Franzese met with future Gambino crime family boss John Gotti, who was then a soldier. Angelo Ruggiero was also present. Franzese was contacted by a flea market owner who complained that his partner was using and selling drugs at the market in Bay Ridge, Brooklyn. Franzese agreed to frighten him and become the new partner. Franzese sent Colombo soldier-turned informant Anthony Sarivola and another member who remains unidentified. Gotti however claimed that the scared-off partner was an associate of his. Franzese later expressed admiration for Gotti, citing his strict mobster lifestyle and his overwhelming ego.

In 1980, Franzese had become a caporegime of a crew of 300.

=== Gasoline bootlegging and the murder of Larry Carrozza ===
In 1981, Franzese was contacted by Lawrence Salvatore Iorizzo, who had developed a scheme to defraud the federal government out of gasoline taxes. Iorizzo was being hassled by criminals in California and offered Franzese a percentage if he would defend and solve the issue. The pair set up 18 stock-bearer companies based in Panama. Under law at the time in Panama, gasoline could be sold tax-free from one wholesale company to the next. Franzese partnered with the Russian Mafia in Brooklyn in the gas scheme.

The wholesale gas was sold to one company, but shipped to another company, while a third company, a dummy company, sold the gasoline on paper, and would forge tax documents for the company that received the gasoline. Franzese's crew was then able to collect and pocket the nine cents per gallon of gasoline in federal tax. Once enforcement agents attempt to collect the tax from the dummy company, it declares bankruptcy and the daisy chain would continue.

This gasoline supplied between one third and one half of all gasoline sold in the New York metropolitan area. According to officials, Franzese kept 75 percent of the profits, making $1.26 million per month, while Iorizzo made $45,000 per month. An associate later testified that Franzese personally made $1 million per week from the gas scheme.

Franzese had claimed that at the height of his career, he generated up to $8 million per week. Revenue officials estimated $250 million in gasoline tax was stolen in New York state per year, before moving on to Florida which was estimated to have lost $40 million to $250 million in stolen gasoline tax. Authorities believe the money was laundered through Franzese's film production company, Miami Gold, to offshore bank accounts in Austria and Panama. Franzese bought a home in Delray Beach, Florida.

In May 1983, Franzese's best friend and Colombo family associate, Larry Carrozza, was killed for having an affair with Franzese's sister and supplying her with cocaine. Salvatore Miciotta shot Carrozza in the back of the head while sitting behind him in a car. According to Miciotta, who later became a government informant, Franzese had insisted—during a meeting two weeks before Carrozza's death—that Carrozza had to be killed and he wanted to do it himself, but Colombo higher-ups chose Miciotta to be the shooter instead.

In 1986, Fortune Magazine listed Franzese as number 18 on its list of the "Fifty Most Wealthy and Powerful Mafia Bosses". Vanity Fair cited him as one of the biggest money earners for the mafia since Al Capone. He was referred to as the "Yuppie Don" in the 1980s, and as "Prince of the Mafia".

=== Entertainment, sports management and other businesses ===
During the 1970s, he began to enter the world of legitimate business and by the mid-1980s Franzese had a stronghold on various businesses such as car dealerships, leasing companies, auto repair shops, restaurants, nightclubs, a contractor company, movie production and distribution companies, travel agencies and video stores.

By 1980, Franzese was a partner with booking agent Norby Walters in his firm. Franzese's role was to intimidate existing and prospective clients. Franzese would later testify he provided the initial $50,000 to Walters to start his agency booking company with a 25% share of any profits. Additionally, Franzese would assist with any entertainers Walters had problems with by meeting their agents. In 1981, Franzese successfully extorted a role for Walters in the U.S. tour by singer Michael Jackson and his brothers. In 1982, the manager for singer Dionne Warwick wanted to drop Walters as an agent; Franzese met with the manager and persuaded him to keep Walters.

In 1983, the FBI launched an investigation into boxing promoter Don King's organized crime connections and targeted Franzese to introduce an FBI undercover agent, using the alias Victor Quintana, to King. Franzese, who had never met King, says he was introduced to him by civil rights leader Al Sharpton. Franzese claimed he first met Sharpton through the Genovese crime family mobster Daniel Pagano. Quintana was to give the impression that he was buying his way into the boxing world in order for King to reveal his criminal associations, however the investigation subsequently collapsed after Quintana failed to follow through with several hundred thousand dollars.

In 1985, Walters set up a sports management agency with Franzese as a silent partner. At a meeting he agreed to hand over $50,000 in return for a 25 percent interest from the sports agency.

Franzese was the president of Miami Gold, a film production company that produced the 1986 film Knights of the City.

=== Indictment and prison (1985) ===
In April 1985, Franzese was acquitted of racketeering charges. In another case in December 1985, Franzese was charged in both Florida and New York in regards to counterfeiting and extortion from the gasoline bootlegging racket. In New York, Franzese was one of nine people indicted on 14 counts. In Florida, Franzese was one of 26 people indicted on 177 counts after a 16-month investigation in Florida called "Operation Tiger Tail".

Iorizzo, who was already sentenced to five years and ordered to pay $1.7 million for his role in the theft of $1.1 million in gas taxes and placed in the witness protection program, began testifying against Franzese and others in their operation in March 1985. On March 21, 1986, Franzese pleaded guilty to one count of racketeering conspiracy and one count of tax conspiracy. Franzese was sentenced to 10 years in prison and ordered to pay $14.7 million in restitution on the federal charges, agreeing to sell his assets including a mansion in Old Brookville, New York, the Miami Gold production company, and use proceeds from the Knights of the City film. He then reached a plea agreement and was sentenced to nine years in prison for state racketeering charges in Florida which would run concurrently with his previous conviction. He also was ordered to pay an additional $3 million in restitution to the state of Florida.

Franzese was subpoenaed to testify at Walters' trial in March 1989, as Walters had invoked his name to frighten college athletes into signing management contracts, including Maurice Douglass. In exchange for his testimony, he was given immunity from prosecution in the Walters case. Walters was found guilty, fined $395,000, and given a sentence of 5 years with the judge in the case citing the importance of Franzese's testimony. After Walters' conviction, Franzese was released from prison on parole after serving 43 months. In September 1990, Walters' conviction was overturned by the 7th Circuit Court of Appeals citing a technicality.

On December 27, 1991, Franzese was sentenced in New York to four years in federal prison for violating the probation requirements from his 1989 release. Franzese had been arrested in Los Angeles on a tax fraud accusation and was sent back to New York for the probation hearing. In court, prosecutors complained that Franzese had only started paying the balance of his court-ordered restitution payments earlier that year. "Mr. Franzese has led the Government on a long, merry chase for a number of years," United States Attorney Andrew J. Maloney said after the court session. "We essentially view him as a con man." Prosecutors said that Franzese was no longer considered by the government to be a federal cooperating witness because of his parole violations.

In 1990, Franzese was portrayed by Joseph Bono in the Martin Scorsese film Goodfellas (1990). While imprisoned in 1991, Franzese became a born-again Christian after he was given a Bible by a prison guard. He also spent three years in solitary confinement.

In 1992, Franzese co-authored his first book, an autobiography, Quitting the Mob. In the book, Franzese discusses his criminal activities, life with his father, and meeting his second wife, Camille Garcia.

== After prison (1994–present) ==
Franzese in an interview in 2026

Franzese was released on November 7, 1994, retiring from the mob in 1995 by moving to California with his wife and children; the relocation was also a result of receiving multiple death threats and contracts on his life, including one approved by his father.

Since his release in 1994, Franzese has publicly renounced and denounced the life of organized crime, stating "I never glamorize my mob life. It's an evil life", and "I don't know one family that's part of that life [mob life] that hasn't been totally devastated". He has since become a motivational speaker for youth, at schools, prisons, and other venues. He also speaks at Christian conferences and churches, including Willow Creek Community Church in 2016.

On July 23, 2002, while appearing on the HBO television program Real Sports with Bryant Gumbel, Franzese stated that during the 1970s and 1980s, he persuaded New York Yankees players who owed money to Colombo loansharks to fix baseball games for betting purposes. The Yankees organization immediately denied Franzese's accusations.

In April 2013, a documentary called The Definitive Guide to the Mob was released by Lionsgate, with Franzese as commentator. Later in 2013, he appeared in Inside the American Mob, a National Geographic documentary.

Franzese released an autobiographical biopic, God the Father, in 2014, which was released in theaters across 20 cities in the United States. The film uses a combination of stock footage, animated recreations, as well as interviews to tell his life story. It cites religion as the motivation for Franzese changing his life.

In March 2015, he appeared in a two-part documentary on the American Mafia with television presenter and reporter Trevor McDonald. He spoke about his wealth, but also the impact that being a member of the Colombo crime family had on his family, and that was why he turned away from organized crime.

In 2017, he played a reformed mobster in the Kevin Sorbo film Let There Be Light.

Franzese hosted a stage musical, A Mob Story, at the Plaza Hotel & Casino in Las Vegas. The show opened in October 2018 and was created and directed by Jeff Kutash.

In 2019, Franzese became co-founder of a national franchise of pizza restaurants called "Slices Pizza". Slices serves Sicilian-style square pizzas with ingredients sourced from Naples and Campania, with ovens from Venice. The franchise started in California, and included five branches across the country at its height. In 2022, Franzese founded Franzese Wines, a line of Armenian wines.

In July 2020, he appeared in the Netflix docuseries Fear City: New York vs the Mafia.

In June 2020, Franzese started a YouTube channel. On his channel he tells stories about his past life, makes interviews, and reviews mafia-related films, television shows and video games, and analyzes their accuracy. His subscriber count exceeded 2 million as of September 2026.

Franzese appeared in the documentary series American Godfathers: The Five Families in 2024.

=== Published works ===
Franzese is the author of seven books:

- Quitting the Mob (1992)
- Blood Covenant (2003)
- The Good, the Bad and the Forgiven (2009)
- I'll Make You an Offer You Can't Refuse (2011)
- From the Godfather to God the Father (2014)
- Blood Covenant: The Story of the "Mafia Prince" Who Publicly Quit the Mob and Lived (2018)
- Mafia Democracy (2022)

== Personal life ==
Franzese is a Christian. He has been married twice. He lives in Newport Beach, California with his wife, Camille Garcia, and has seven children. Franzese met his current wife in 1984, while shooting the film Knights of the City in Ft. Lauderdale, Florida. His wife, a Christian, also influenced him in his decision to leave the mob.

In 2010, Franzese's brother John Franzese Jr. testified against their father Sonny Franzese in a racketeering case after wearing a wire during conversations with him. Michael described his brother as a "nobody in the mob life", and that his father "felt sick" that one of his sons had "betrayed him like this". Sonny Franzese was sentenced to eight years in prison, and was released from prison in 2017 at the age of 100, dying three years later.
