= Thomas Gambino =

Italian-American mobster (1929–2023)

- Born: Thomas Francis Gambino; August 23, 1929; New York City, U.S.
- Died: October 3, 2023 (aged 94)
- Other name: Tommy
- Education: Manhattan College
- Occupation: Mobster
- Spouse: Frances Lucchese (m. 1962)
- Parent: Carlo Gambino
- Relatives: Paul Castellano (second cousin); Joseph Lucchese (uncle-in-law); Tommy Lucchese (father-in-law)
- Allegiance: Gambino crime family
- Convictions: Racketeering, conspiracy (1993)
- Penalty: 5 years' imprisonment

Thomas Francis Gambino (Italian: [ɡamˈbiːno]; August 23, 1929 – October 3, 2023) was an Italian-American New York City mobster and a longtime caporegime of the Gambino crime family who successfully controlled lucrative trucking rackets in the New York City Garment District. He was the son of Carlo Gambino, second cousin of Paul Castellano and son-in-law of Tommy Lucchese.

== Early life ==
Gambino was born on August 23, 1929, to Carlo and Catherine (née Castellano) Gambino. He had three siblings, Joseph, Carl, and Phyllis Gambino Sinatra. His father joined the original Mangano crime family during the 1930s, rose to capo and later to underboss. In 1957, Carlo Gambino became boss of what is now called the Gambino crime family. Carlo Gambino became one of the most powerful mobsters in Cosa Nostra history.

Thomas Gambino graduated from Manhattan College in the Bronx and then started working for the Gambino family. In 1962 Gambino married Tommy Lucchese's daughter Frances. Over 1,000 guests attended the wedding, at which Carlo Gambino presented Lucchese with a $30,000 gift. In return, Lucchese gave Gambino a part of his rackets at Idlewild Airport (now called John F. Kennedy Airport). Lucchese exercised control over airport management security and all the airport unions. As a team, Lucchese and Gambino now controlled the airport, the commission, and most organized crime in New York City. When Tommy Lucchese died in 1967, his interests in the garment industry were passed to Thomas Gambino, forming the basis of Gambino's wealth.

By the 1990s, Thomas Gambino owned three homes; one in Florida, another in Lido Beach, New York, and a third on Manhattan's exclusive Upper East Side. Thomas Gambino also headed the Gambino Medical and Science Foundation, which in 1991 financed a $2 million pediatric bone marrow transplant unit at Long Island Jewish Medical Center. Thomas Gambino's personal wealth was estimated to be around $75 million in 1992.

== Castellano regime ==
After Carlo Gambino died in 1976, his designated successor, Paul Castellano, became the new family boss. Many family members were angered by Castellano's ascension, preferring underboss Aniello Dellacroce instead. However, Dellacroce insisted that his supporters support Castellano for the good of the family. This move temporarily quieted dissension in the Gambino ranks.

In contrast, Thomas Gambino, who was Castellano's second cousin, enjoyed a strong relationship with the new boss. Gambino epitomized the low-profile, well buffered, successful businessman image common among second-generation members of the Cosa Nostra. Given his college education, Castellano gave him responsibility for the family finances and running the trucking in the Garment District in Manhattan. Gambino and his allies in the Lucchese family were successful at infiltrating several legitimate businesses, especially the garment industry. This was due to Gambino's strong influence on the garment trucking business in New York and New Jersey. In 1981, the garment industry honored Gambino as its Man of the Year. Castellano quickly rewarded Gambino by making him a full family member, or "made man", and later a capo of his own crew.

In December 1985, the death of underboss Dellacroce brought the simmering dissension in the Gambino family to a head. Instead of selecting an established and respected capo to be the new underboss, Castellano instead chose his driver, Thomas Bilotti. At this point, capo John Gotti and Frank DeCicco saw the opportunity to capitalize on this discontent and kill Castellano and then take over the family leadership. On December 16, 1985, both Castellano and Bilotti were murdered by Gotti gunmen in a restaurant ambush at Sparks Steak House. Gambino, who was not part of the conspiracy, arrived at Sparks moments after the killing, to be turned away by DeCicco. Gotti was then elected the new boss of the Gambino family.

== Gotti regime ==
Although Gambino had been a Castellano loyalist, he quickly paid loyalty to Gotti and was able to preserve his position within the family. Since Gambino was such a strong earner for the family, Gotti did not want to replace him. In a conversation with Gambino mobster George Remini, Gotti had this comment about Gambino:

I mean it sounds crazy, Georgie, but I was telling Frankie and Angelo, I'm gonna suggest to Tommy, we're gonna beef up his regime, Tommy Gambino, but we're not giving him no (expletive deleted) hotheads.

In April 1989, Gambino was indicted for obstruction of justice by lying to a grand jury about Gambino racketeering activities, but was acquitted later that year. On October 18, 1990, Gambino was indicted again on charges of extorting the garment industry. Through their ownership of four trucking companies, the Gambinos were able to charge shipping rates 40% higher than smaller non-mob shipping companies. Some of the strongest evidence in this case came from wiretapped conversations six years earlier between Gambino and Castellano at Castellano's Staten Island home. The conversations proved that the Gambinos and two other crime families exercised strong control over the Garment District. The government also set up a small garment factory in the Chinatown section of Manhattan, with New York State Police troopers posing as supervisors, to gain evidence against Gambino's trucking monopoly.

The government offered Gambino a plea bargain that included a guilty admission, a $12 million restitution payment, and a promise to leave the garment trucking business. In February 1992, Gambino accepted the plea bargain and avoided prison. Prosecutors would remark that a "terrifying fear of prison" helped motivate Gambino to accept the government deal.

== Indictment and prison ==
In 1991, Gambino, Gotti, Salvatore "Sammy the Bull" Gravano, and Frank LoCascio were indicted on charges of racketeering, loansharking, extortion, illegal gambling, and 11 counts of murder. Soon after the indictment, Gravano decided to become a government witness and testified against his former colleagues, including Gambino. In April 1992, Gotti and LoCascio were convicted and sentenced to life.

On May 11, 1993, Gambino was convicted of two counts of racketeering and racketeering conspiracy. Prosecutors claimed that Gambino had been supervising illegal gambling and loansharking activities in Connecticut since 1985. In January 1996, Gambino started serving a five-year prison sentence.

In May 1999, the U.S. Securities and Exchange Commission (SEC) filed fraud charges against Gambino's stockbroker, Mohammed Ali Khan. While still in prison, Gambino had sued Khan for defrauding him out of approximately $2 million.

On May 10, 2000, Gambino was released from prison. He died on October 3, 2023, at the age of 94.

== Popular culture ==
Thomas Gambino is portrayed by Tony Sirico in the 1998 made-for-television movie Witness to the Mob about Gravano and John Gotti.
