= James Failla =

American mobster (1919–1999)

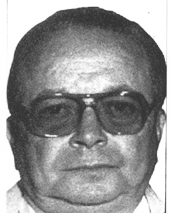
- An undated FBI mugshot of Failla
- Born: January 22, 1919; New York City, U.S.
- Died: August 5, 1999 (aged 80); Texas, U.S.
- Resting place: Moravian Cemetery
- Other name: "Jimmy Brown"
- Occupation: Mobster
- Allegiance: Gambino crime family
- Conviction: Conspiracy to commit murder (1994)
- Penalty: 7 years' imprisonment (1994)

James "Jimmy Brown" Failla (January 22, 1919 – August 5, 1999) was an American mobster who was a high ranking caporegime with the Gambino crime family and a major power in the garbage-hauling industry in New York City. Failla's crew was based in Brooklyn, with operations stretching into Staten Island, Manhattan, and New Jersey.

== Criminal career ==
=== Early days ===
Failla was raised in the Bensonhurst section of Brooklyn, a neighborhood dominated by New York's La Cosa Nostra families. Failla eventually relocated to a modest home on Staten Island. In 1951, Failla was convicted of bookmaking and illegal gambling charges and paid a $25 fine. During the 1950s, Failla became close to Carlo Gambino, underboss to Albert Anastasia, boss of what would become the Gambino crime family. Failla later served as Gambino's chauffeur/bodyguard. After the 1957 murder of Anastasia, the new boss Carlo Gambino appointed Failla as his point man in the waste-hauling industry.

In 1966, Failla was again fined for bookmaking and illegal gambling. In 1970, Failla was charged with contempt of court for refusing to testify before a grand jury, but the charge was later dropped. By 1971, Failla had become a caporegime in the Gambino family.

=== Man of power and caution ===
Failla was one of the most respected and feared racketeers in New York, and one of the all-time top earners. A resident of Ocean Breeze, Staten Island, Failla's nickname "Jimmy Brown" derived from his fondness for brown clothes. Despite his power and wealth, Failla lived modestly.

Law enforcement agents characterized Failla as being extremely cautious and constantly wary of electronic surveillance. Failla had a reputation as being one of the most discreet mobsters. During 1983, when the FBI was bugging the home of Gambino boss Paul Castellano, Failla was present for hundreds of hours of meetings. During that six-month period, Failla barely spoke ten words on all the tapes combined. To avoid electronic surveillance, Failla did not have a landline telephone in his social club in Bensonhurst. He did hang a poster on the wall showing a cockroach wearing a headset with the caption "Our bugs have ears". Failla's cautious habits allowed him to avoid criminal prosecution for many years.

Failla directed a large crew that was involved in loansharking, illegal gambling, and extortion. This crew included made members Frank DeCicco, Tommy Bilotti, Joseph "Joey Cigars" Francolino, Joseph "the Cat" LaForte, Anthony Vitta, Thomas "Tommy Sparrow" Spinelli, Louis Astuto, Nunzio Squillante, Philip Mazzara, and Angelo Paccione. Failla's closest confidant, an associate he met in grammar school as a child, Bill "Willy The Fox" Martoccia, could often be found at Failla's side. Failla and others in power both recognized and respected Martoccia for his negotiating prowess in facilitating the large majority of the family's legitimate waste hauling contracts. It was no secret that New York City's garbage hauling and long-haul trucking was an industry largely under the power and control of Failla, and as such, Martoccia managed both the insurance underwriting and claims adjusting of the family's garbage hauling and long-haul trucking accounts. When in New York, Failla and Martoccia could be found together at the Veterans and Friends Social Club on 86th Street and 14th Avenue in Bensonhurst. During the winter months, Failla and Martoccia, along with their wives and children, stayed at the beachfront Diplomat Resort near Fort Lauderdale in South Florida.

Failla and his associates are notoriously known to be heavily discreet, often avoided being seen with certain individuals in public, and frequently utilized Failla's infamous "walk-and-talk" method to avoid surveillance while discussing legitimate and lawful business dealings. While Failla was feared by many, as his reputation was of a fierce and vicious operator and handler of his trade, he did in fact conduct the majority of his business in a lawful manner, which for many years saved him from tangling with the criminal judicial system. Failla avoided incarceration for many years due to his unique manner of conducting himself and his business. Failla is acknowledged and distinguished as one of the all-time top earners for the Gambino family. Nevertheless, after many years of unsuccessful efforts by the Federal Bureau of Investigation (FBI) to indict Failla, he was eventually incarcerated and then soon after passed while serving a sentence in prison for conspiracy to commit murder, a conviction the District Attorney's Office obtained with much help from mobster-turned-informant Sammy "The Bull" Gravano.

=== Garbage rackets ===
For 30 years, Failla controlled the Trade Waste Association of Greater New York, an association of trash haulers in the New York area. Failla skimmed off 50% of the association dues for the Gambino family. Failla allocated hauling routes and set pricing. Companies were prohibited from switching trash-hauling companies or using non-union drivers. To prevent competitors from entering the New York City market, Failla used threats and intimidation.

In 1993, the Houston-based Browning-Ferris Industries (BFI), a national trash-hauling corporation, started doing business in New York. In February of that year, a company executive found a dog's severed head on his doorstep in Rockland County, New York. The following note had been placed in the dog's mouth: "Welcome to New York." Due to this mob control, New York businesses paid twice as much in trash fees as comparable businesses in Chicago, Los Angeles, and Boston. Coupled with Failla's control of Teamsters Union Local 813, the union local for trash-haul drivers, Failla was able to extort hundreds of millions of dollars from New York businesses. John Gotti, after taking control of the Gambino family, was recorded on Federal surveillance saying: "Jimmy Brown, he took the garbage industry and turned it into a candy store."

=== Castellano years ===
In 1976, Gambino died and Failla became the acting boss of the Gambino family. However, Gambino's successor was Paul Castellano. Failla built a strong relationship with Castellano, meeting him weekly at Castellano's Todt Hill mansion on Staten Island. On December 16, 1985, Failla was waiting for Castellano at the Sparks Steak House in Midtown Manhattan to discuss family matters. When Castellano arrived outside the restaurant, gunmen allied with Gambino capo John Gotti assassinated him on the street. Soon after Castellano's death, Gotti became the new boss. Despite Failla's ties with Castellano, Gotti left Failla in charge of the lucrative trash-hauling rackets.

=== Gotti years ===
Over time, Failla built a close partnership with the Genovese crime family. It was rumored that the Genovese leadership wanted to install Failla as Gambino boss after a failed assassination attempt on then Gambino boss John Gotti. In 1986, as a result of the tapings at Castellano's house in 1983, Failla was indicted on racketeering charges. However, in June 1987, Failla was acquitted on federal racketeering charges. The reason cited for the acquittal was his lack of conversation on those tapings.

In 1989, Failla participated in the murder of Gambino mobster Thomas Spinelli. A member of Failla's crew, Spinelli had recently testified before a grand jury and was due to appear again. Gambino underboss Sammy Gravano ordered Spinelli's murder to prevent him from providing further testimony. Spinelli was murdered inside a Brooklyn factory.

In December 1990, when Gotti went to jail awaiting trial, he appointed Failla as acting boss of the family. After Gotti's incarceration, Failla and Peter Gotti both jointly held the acting street-boss position until Peter took over control completely.

=== Prison ===
In 1991, Gravano became a government witness and implicated Failla in the 1989 Spinelli murder. In April 1993, Failla was charged with racketeering and murdering Spinelli. In 1994, in a plea bargain deal, Failla pleaded guilty to one count of conspiracy to commit murder. During the sentencing phase, Failla appeared in court on crutches and his lawyer pleaded for leniency based on his client's heart problems and hypertension. Failla was sentenced to seven years in prison.

== Death ==
On August 5, 1999, James Failla died of natural causes in a federal prison in Texas.
