= Anthony Gaggi =

American mobster (1925-1988)

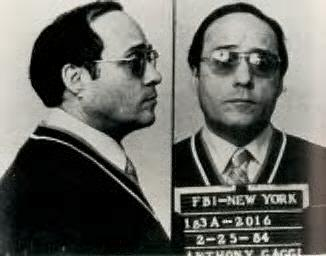
- Gaggi's February 25, 1984 FBI mugshot
- Born: Antonino Frank Gaggi; August 7, 1925; New York City, New York, U.S.
- Died: April 17, 1988 (aged 62); New York City, New York, U.S.
- Other name: "Nino"
- Occupation: Mobster
- Relatives: Dominick Montiglio (nephew)
- Allegiance: Gambino crime family

Anthony Frank Gaggi (born Antonino Frank Gaggi; August 7, 1925 – April 17, 1988), better known as Nino Gaggi, was an Italian American mobster who was a caporegime (captain) in the Gambino crime family of New York City. Based in Canarsie, Brooklyn, Gaggi was a criminal mentor to Roy DeMeo and a longtime partner of the infamous DeMeo crew, as well as the uncle of mob informant Dominick Montiglio.

== Early life ==
Nino Gaggi was born on August 7, 1925, in New York City to Angelo and Mary Gaggi, the youngest of three children. He had a sister, Marie, and a brother named Roy. Gaggi's father had emigrated to the United States from Palermo, Sicily, Italy, and operated a barbershop on the Lower East Side of Manhattan. His mother worked as a seamstress until Gaggi's birth.

Gaggi dropped out of school during the eighth grade and followed his father into the barber business. He also earned extra money by delivering flowers. It was at this age that Gaggi learned the profitability of loan sharking to gamblers.

When Gaggi was a teenager, his family moved to New Jersey after purchasing a small farm. When he turned seventeen in 1942, he attempted to join the United States Army, but was rejected due to myopia. In 1943, Gaggi's family left the farm and moved to the Bath Beach area of Brooklyn. Angelo resumed work as a barber while his mother and sister worked in a dress factory. Later, Marie married Anthony Santamaria, a deliveryman and boxer. Discharged from the army due to injury, Roy sold peanut dispensers to bars.

== Criminal career ==
After returning to New York, Gaggi decided to pursue criminal activities. His father's cousin was mobster Frank Scalise, a founding member of the Gambino crime family, who helped Gaggi obtain a job at a truck dock where he quickly became a supervisor. Scalise eventually allowed Gaggi to become a "ghost employee", someone who did not have to work; Gaggi could devote all his time to loan sharking in Brooklyn bars and pool halls. This "no show" job also allowed him to report legitimate, taxable income to the Internal Revenue Service and avoid prosecution for tax evasion.

In 1947, Gaggi's sister Marie gave birth to Dominick Montiglio. Although her husband Santamaria was Montiglio's father, Gaggi was the dominant personality in the household, eventually leading to Santamaria's estrangement from his family. Gaggi soon became Montiglio's surrogate father. When he became older, Montiglio joined his uncle in criminal activities.

In 1954, after his first arrest, Gaggi was charged with running an international auto theft ring. Operating out of a used car lot in Brooklyn, the ring was backed by Scalise, now consigliere to the Gambino family. For two years, Gaggi and two associates fabricated false vehicle registrations for nonexistent Cadillacs. The gang stole cars that matched the phony vehicle descriptions and replaced their original VIN numbers with new fake numbers. They also gave the vehicles new license plates that matched the falsified registrations. The ring then sold the stolen vehicles in Florida, Georgia, Texas and Mexico.

Gaggi married in 1955 while his auto theft trial was underway. During his trial, witnesses "forgot" their testimony on the witness stand and Gaggi's co-defendants refused to testify against him. In early 1956, Gaggi was acquitted. Later that year, Gaggi became a father; his wife and child now lived on the first floor of the three-story Gaggi home.

In 1957, the Gambino family underwent a dramatic change in leadership. In June, Scalise was shot and killed at a fruit stand in the Bronx. In October, Gambino boss Albert Anastasia was shot to death in a barber's chair at the Park Central Hotel. Immediately after the Anastasia murder, Gaggi ordered his family to stay home for a few days. His close associate, underboss Carlo Gambino, became the new boss. He appointed caporegime (captain) Aniello Dellacroce, an Anastasia loyalist, as underboss and gave him control over the Manhattan faction of the family.

In October 1960, Gaggi committed his first murder for the Gambino family. He served on a hit squad that murdered Gambino mobster Vincent Squillante, who was suspected of killing Scalise. According to Montiglio, Gaggi described the murder: “We surprised [Squillante] in the Bronx. We shot him in the head, stuffed him in the trunk, then dumped him for good.” In this case, “dumped him for good” meant that they hauled the body to the basement of a building, loaded it into a trash incinerator and cremated it. After the murder, Gaggi was inducted into the family.

=== DeMeo crew ===
By the mid-1960s, Gaggi had established a large clientele of loan shark customers and was also a silent partner in several businesses. To increase his earnings, he partnered with mobster Roy DeMeo, who was running a stolen car ring in the Brooklyn neighborhoods of Flatlands and Canarsie. DeMeo had connections with the Lucchese crime family and a reputation as a capable and resourceful earner. Gaggi persuaded DeMeo to work instead for the Gambinos.

Gaggi and DeMeo began making co-loans to loan shark customers. By 1970, DeMeo was officially working for Gaggi and paying him a weekly street tax. In 1972, the two men forced their way into a partnership with a company that illegally processed X-rated films. After law enforcement raided the company in 1973, owner Paul Rothenberg began to cooperate with them. Gaggi ordered DeMeo to murder Rothenberg, whose body was found shortly thereafter.

The Rothenberg killing was the first of many murders committed by DeMeo's crew. While Gaggi was not involved in most of these killings, he did participate in some of them. Gaggi and DeMeo shot and killed Vincent Governara, a young man with no mob ties, over a fight between him and Gaggi that had occurred twelve years before. In 1976, DeMeo killed George Byrum, an electrical contractor who had tipped off thieves who attempted to burglarize Gaggi's vacation home in Florida without knowing Gaggi and his wife were present. Under Gaggi's direction, DeMeo shot and killed Byrum in a Miami hotel room while Gaggi and another mobster, Tony Plate, attempted to dismember the body. However, they were interrupted by a construction crew outside the room that was repairing a faulty air conditioning unit, causing them to flee. Byrum's bloody corpse was later found by the motel maid.

In late 1976, Gambino died of natural causes. Against expectations, he had designated Paul Castellano, his brother-in-law and head of the family's Brooklyn faction, as the new boss. However, the Manhattan faction favored Dellacroce, who was in prison for tax evasion at the time of Gambino's death and was unable to challenge the succession. At a leadership meeting held at Gaggi's house, it was agreed that Castellano would become the family's new boss while Dellacroce was retained as underboss. Gaggi was promoted to caporegime of Castellano's old crew. Gaggi remained close to Castellano, hoping to eventually become promoted to underboss.

Castellano did not immediately "open the books" for new members into the family, opting instead to promote existing members and reshuffle his captains to new crews. He continuously resisted Gaggi's proposal that DeMeo be admitted into the family, initially because he felt DeMeo was too violent and uncontrollable. In the summer of 1977, Castellano relented and allowed for DeMeo to be made. During this period, DeMeo successfully formed an alliance between the Gambino family and the Westies, an Irish-American gang based in Hell's Kitchen. DeMeo continued to expand his many illegal activities and kicked more money up to Gaggi. Meanwhile, Gaggi expanded his loan sharking business, with a large loan he secured from Montiglio, now a Gambino associate, in charge of collecting payments from DeMeo and Gaggi's customers.

On June 7, 1978, Gaggi and nine other mobsters were charged with racketeering, conspiracy and fraud as a result of a year-long federal investigation into the bankruptcy of the Westchester Premier Theater in Tarrytown. The majority of the evidence in this case came from wiretapped conversations; fortunately for Gaggi, he never said anything incriminating. In December 1978, Gaggi was cleared of all charges.

=== Eppolito murders ===
By 1979, DeMeo was involved in loan sharking, murder-for-hire and the operation of an auto theft ring that shipped stolen cars to Puerto Rico and the Middle East.

Gaggi received a large percentage of profits from these rackets, along with money from DeMeo's drug trafficking. The DeMeo crew sold cocaine, marijuana and a variety of pills in large amounts. DeMeo continued his drug trade despite a public prohibition that Castellano had made against this type of racket. Gambino caporegime James Eppolito told Castellano that Gaggi and DeMeo were trafficking drugs, claiming that DeMeo had cheated Eppolito's son, a Gambino soldier, in a drug deal. In addition, Eppolito accused Gaggi of being a police informant. Eppolito asked for permission to murder Gaggi and DeMeo, but Castellano instead sided with them and gave Gaggi and DeMeo permission to murder the Eppolitos.

On October 1, 1979, Gaggi and DeMeo shot and killed both Eppolito and his son. However, a witness drove by as the shooting unfolded and alerted an off-duty policeman, who soon found Gaggi walking away from the crime scene. Since DeMeo had split up with Gaggi as they left the scene, he was not arrested or identified by the witness. After a brief shootout, the policeman wounded Gaggi in the neck and arrested him. Although charged with the murders, and the attempted murder of the police officer, Gaggi was only convicted of assault. He was sentenced to between five and fifteen years in federal prison.

While Gaggi was in prison, DeMeo took over Gaggi's crew as acting captain. In 1981, Gaggi's sentence was overturned on appeal and he was released from prison. Gaggi had bribed a juror to make false claims of government misconduct during the trial.

=== Downfall ===
By the time of Gaggi's release, Montiglio had fallen into drug addiction and fled New York for fear of punishment from the Gambino family. The Federal Bureau of Investigation (FBI) dismantled DeMeo's auto theft ring and sent two crew members to prison. In 1980, a third crew member, Vito Arena, became a government witness. In 1982, Arena began testifying about crimes committed by Gaggi and the DeMeo crew. Testimony from Los Angeles mobster-turned-informant Jimmy Fratianno, with whom Gaggi partook in an extortion scheme at the Westchester Premier Theater, was also used against Gaggi. As the investigation intensified, both Gaggi and Castellano became concerned about DeMeo cooperating with authorities if he were arrested. On January 20, 1983, DeMeo's body was found nearly frozen in the trunk of his car with a chandelier placed on top of it. DeMeo's killer was never identified, although Gambino underboss Frank DeCicco allegedly gave the task to DeMeo's own men.

Shortly after the murder, Montiglio returned to New York to collect an old loan shark debt and was arrested. To avoid prosecution, he started cooperating with the government, providing information on Gaggi and the DeMeo crew. Montiglio's information led to the indictments of both Gaggi and Castellano. By early 1984, some of the DeMeo crew members were arrested. One of them, Richard DiNome, was later murdered on February 4, 1984. As with DeMeo, DiNome's killers were never identified, but law enforcement assumed they were the remaining members of the DeMeo crew. DiNome's brother, Frederick DiNome, also suspected the crew of killing Richard and agreed to become a government witness.

On February 25, 1984, Gaggi was arrested and indicted on multiple charges of racketeering and murder. Castellano was indicted the following month. The court decided to split the numerous charges against both men into two trials. The first trial, which concerned the auto theft ring and five related murders, began in October 1985 and saw testimony from Arena, DiNome and Montiglio. In December 1985, midway through the trial, Castellano was assassinated outside the Sparks Steak House in Manhattan on orders from Dellacroce loyalist John Gotti. With Castellano's death, Gaggi became the lead defendant in the first trial while Gotti quickly assumed control of the family.

In March 1986, Gaggi was convicted of conspiracy to sell stolen cars and was sentenced to five years in Lewisburg Federal Penitentiary. In 1988, he was transferred from Lewisburg to the Metropolitan Correction Center for his second trial. The second trial would focus on Gaggi's racketeering acts and on the twenty-five murders allegedly committed by the DeMeo crew.

== Death ==
On April 17, 1988, while awaiting his second trial, Gaggi died of a heart attack.

== Media ==
Montiglio provided writers Jerry Capeci and Gene Mustaine information on Gaggi and the DeMeo crew for their book Murder Machine. In both the book and the television documentaries, Montiglio blamed his criminal actions on Gaggi's bad influence.

Gaggi is played by Philip Williams in the 2001 made-for-television film Boss of Bosses.

In the movie The Iceman, a fictionalized version of Gaggi, named Leo Marks (played by Robert Davi), is a high-ranking member in the Gambino crime family and is killed by Richard Kuklinski.

In the movie Inside Man Anthony Gaggi is also played by Robert Davi.
