= Augustus Sclafani =

American mobster

Augustus Sclafani, d. 1986, also known as "Big Gus", was a New York mobster who was a mob associate with the Gambino crime family. Sclafani is not to be confused with the younger Augustus "Gus Boy" Sclafani, another Gambino family member.

During the 1970s, Sclafani and Mildred Russo, his mother-in-law, used her position as a court clerk in the Daniel Patrick Moynihan United States Courthouse for the United States District Court for the Southern District of New York to leak confidential information on the Gambino family to Paul Castellano. In 1987, both Russo and Sclafani were indicted for racketeering and conspiracy to obstruct justice. Sclafini had already been declared as a fugitive from justice, although law enforcement believed that Sclafani was dead.

According to mob witness Sammy Gravano, while Paul Castellano was boss of the Gambino family, Sclafani accused Gambino mobster Frank DeCicco of being a mob informant. DeCicco successfully defended himself from this charge and told Gravano that he would murder Sclafani after Castellano was out of power. In 1986, Gambino hitman Joseph Watts shot and stabbed Sclafani to death in a club in Little Italy, Manhattan on orders from new Gambino boss John Gotti.

After Castellano's murder, DeCicco told Gravano that "Gus is gone."
