= George DeCicco =

American mobster

George "Big Georgie" DeCicco (March 20, 1929 - October 3, 2014) was an American mobster and longtime caporegime in the Gambino crime family. DeCicco is one of the last captains of the old John Gotti administration in the 1980s who was able to avoid indictments. DeCicco is the uncle of former Gambino underboss Frank DeCicco, who was killed in a car-bomb meant for his boss John Gotti, ordered by then boss of the Genovese crime family who is now deceased, Vincent "Chin" Gigante, and Lucchese crime family leaders Vittorio "Vic" Amuso and Anthony "Gaspipe" Casso as revenge for the murder of former Gambino crime family boss, Paul Castellano, a strong ally of both the Genovese and Lucchese crime families.

== Gotti's crew ==
During the 1980s, DeCicco worked as a sidewalk soldier in the old crew of John Gotti, then run by Angelo "Quack Quack" Ruggiero, but because Ruggiero suffered from cancer in 1989, Gotti's brother Gene took over the crew, only to discover that he would be convicted of drug trafficking and narcotics charges and sentenced to 50 years in prison. Working with Gambino mobsters John Carneglia, Salvatore "Fat Sally" Scala, Arnold "Zeke" Squitieri and Anthony "Red" Scarpaci for many years, DeCicco was at that time promoted to the rank of caporegime in the family.

== Gambino capo ==
Toward the 1990s, John Gotti was eventually caught up to by US law enforcement, as his underboss Salvatore "Sammy the Bull" Gravano decided to turn state's evidence due to internal rivalry with Gotti at the time, and was put on the stand to testify against Gotti, consigliere Frank "Frankie Loc" LoCascio and dozens of other Gambino mobsters during the early 1990s. In 1992, Gotti and LoCascio were sentenced to life imprisonment for murder, conspiracy, extortion, loansharking, money laundering, tax evasion and illegal gambling charges. But as many went down due to the testimony provided by Gravano, others went under the radar, especially former rivals of Gotti like Nicholas "Little Nick" Corozzo and Leonard "Lenny" DiMaria, who were at some point promoted to run the Gambino crime family unofficially with Pete Gotti. DeCicco, a true Gotti loyalist, also went under the radar of the US law enforcement, as he continued to operate out of the Staten Island and Brooklyn factions of the family, with labor racketeering, extortion, money laundering, loansharking, illegal gambling and fraud activities.

== Indictments and trial ==
On January 30, 2007, more than ten mobsters from two of the Five Families were arrested and indicted on federal Racketeer Influenced and Corrupt Organizations Act charges, including DeCicco, one of the last untouched capos from the old John Gotti regime in the 1980s. DeCicco was charged with operating a multimillion-dollar-a-year loansharking operation in New York City, as well as extortion, illegal gambling, racketeering and money laundering operations. As it turns out, an associate of DeCicco had turned state's evidence, as a soldier in the DeCicco crew named Joseph Orlando had threatened to kill him over a loansharking debt. Because he thought he would be killed, the associate turned to the federal authorities for help, and provided the loansharking operation to the federal prosecutors. At the same time, much of their illegal business was recorded by hidden wires on the newly made turncoat. Toward December 2007, George DeCicco's lawyer said he would seek house arrest for his client because DeCicco reputedly has heart problems and wears a nitroglycerin patch. On December 19, 2007 DeCicco pleaded guilty to racketeering charges and faced 27 to 33 months in prison. He served his time at the Devens Federal Medical Center in Massachusetts. He was released on December 1, 2009.

== Attempted murder of his son ==
On June 6, 2007, DeCicco's son Robert DeCicco, whom federal authorities identified as a 56-year-old mob associate, was shot four times as he exited a pharmacy in Bath Beach. According to the Post, the bungled assassination happened the day after another Gambino crime family mobster busted with DeCicco and his father and in January he was moved into protective custody because of threats against his life. The younger DeCicco, who was indicted in January along with his father, had just got into his Cadillac Seville after shopping moments before the assassination-attempt. DeCicco managed to drag himself out of the car and stagger into a pharmacy to call for help.
