= Carneglia =

Carneglia is a surname. Notable people with the surname include:

- Charles Carneglia (born 1946), American mobster, brother of John
- John Carneglia (born 1945), American mobster
