= Boss of Bosses =

2001 television film directed by Dwight H. Little

- Based on: Boss of Bosses by Joseph F. O'Brien, Andris Kurins, and Laurence Shames
- Screenplay by: Jere Cunningham
- Directed by: Dwight H. Little
- Starring: Chazz Palminteri; Angela Alvarado; Jay O. Sanders; Clancy Brown; Steven Bauer
- Music by: John Altman
- Country of origin: United States
- Original language: English

Production
- Producers: Lois Bonfiglio; Iain Paterson
- Cinematography: Brian J. Reynolds
- Editor: Michael D. Ornstein
- Running time: 93 minutes
- Production company: Bleecker Street Films

Original release
- Network: TNT
- Release: June 3, 2001

Boss of Bosses is a 2001 American made-for-TV movie about the life of former Gambino crime family boss Paul Castellano directed by Dwight H. Little. It stars Chazz Palminteri as Paul Castellano, Patricia Mauceri as his wife Nina, Mark Margolis as Joseph Armone, and Angela Alvarado as his mistress Gloria Olarte.

== Overview ==
The film focuses on Paul growing up, becoming disenchanted with his working class lifestyle, spending time and being influenced by his cousin Carlo Gambino, his friendship with Joseph Armone and Tommy Bilotti, and also on his growing relationship with his maid Gloria. The film serves as a companion piece to Gotti. As "Boss of Bosses" climaxes with Paul Castellano's murder, while Gotti focuses on the events before, during and after the murder.

The film documents his rocky relationship with his soldiers, along with friend Neil Dellacroce, and climaxes when he attends the famous "meeting" at Sparks Steak House, where he and his bodyguard/underboss Tommy Bilotti are murdered as they exit their vehicle in an ambush arranged by John Gotti.

== Cast ==
- Chazz Palminteri as Paul Castellano
- Angela Alvarado as Gloria Olarte
- Jay O. Sanders as Joseph O'Brien
- Clancy Brown as Andris Kurins
- Richard Foronjy as Tommy Bilotti
- Mark Margolis as Joseph "Piney" Armone
- Dayton Callie as Neil Dellacroce
- Patricia Mauceri as Nina Castellano
- Al Ruscio as Carlo Gambino
- Sonny Marinelli as John Gotti
- Philip Williams as Nino Gaggi
- Steven Bauer as Vito Genovese
- Yani Gellman as Young Paul Castellano
- William DeMeo as Young Carlo Gambino
- Carlos Díaz as Philip Castellano
- Gerry Mendicino as Father Vicente
- Ron Gabriel as Thomas Agro
- Michael A. Miranda as Roy DeMeo
- Vito Rezza as Angelo Ruggiero
- Tony Nappo as Gene Gotti
- Gino Marrocco as Carmine Persico
- Tony Perri as Anthony Salerno
- Daniel Benzali as Bruce Mouw
