= Joseph Watt (disambiguation) =

Joseph Watt (1887–1955) was a Scottish recipient of the Victoria Cross.

Joseph or Joe Watt may also refer to:

- Joseph M. Watt (born 1947), Oklahoma Supreme Court Justice
- Joe Watt (1919–1983), NFL running back

== See also ==
- Joe Watts, mobster
