= Tony Rampino =

American criminal (1939–2010)

- Rampino's May 2, 1971 NYPD mugshot
- Born: Anthony J. Rampino c. 1939; New York City, New York, U.S.
- Died: December 20, 2010 (aged 71); New Hartford, New York, U.S.
- Other name: Tony Roach
- Occupation: Mobster
- Allegiance: Gambino crime family

Anthony J. Rampino (c. 1939 – 20 December 2010), also known as "Tony Roach", was an American mobster who was affiliated with the Gambino crime family of New York City, and involved in truck hijacking and drug trafficking.

== Biography ==
Rampino earned the nickname "Tony Roach" or simply "Roach" because of his supposed physical resemblance to the cockroach; the name assumed a double meaning afterward when Rampino started smoking copious amounts of marijuana. He was involved in drug trafficking. He became a close friend of John Gotti, Angelo Ruggiero, Nicholas Corozzo, and Leonard DiMaria. He was a cadaverous looking man with huge hands and long arms that seemed to reach down past his knees, and an odd rubbery-looking face. He liked to contort his face into all kinds of horrible grimaces in front of a mirror. Years of practice allowed him, at a second's notice, to shape his face into something like The Phantom of the Opera. He firmly believed that such faces would frighten any enemy. Rampino's passions were stickball and being a successful thief.

Rampino had been troubled with a severe heroin addiction in the 1960s which was well known among his criminal associates, but had successfully kicked the drug habit by 1979. Former friend Sammy Gravano later said, "It was all around amongst us that people with John were heavy, heavy in drugs; personally I don't believe John ever did it himself. But he had to know what was going on. I mean, there's Genie (Gene Gotti), his own brother, Angelo Ruggiero, who he grew up with, the other guys with him — John Carneglia, Edward Lino, Tony Roach (Anthony Rampino) — who not only had a reputation for drugs but was an ex-junkie." Rampino and Wilfred Johnson served as John Gotti's chief loan collectors for the crew.

Rampino was an associate of the Gambino crime family affiliated with John Gotti's crew, which was headquartered out of the Bergin Hunt and Fish Club in Ozone Park, Queens, but never became a fully initiated, or "made" member, of the organization. John Marzulli of the New York Daily News described Rampino as a "colorful mob character" who was "notable for his skull-like appearance". Another, unnamed, source called him "the scariest man you'd ever meet — tall, lean and he looked like a vampire".

Rampino was a backup shooter in the assassination of Gambino crime family boss Paul Castellano and his underboss Tommy Bilotti, who were each shot dead by a team of hitmen outside Sparks Steak House in Midtown Manhattan on December 16, 1985. According to a source "[Rampino's] job was to kill anyone, civilians or cops, who followed the hit team". The murder of Castellano allowed for Gotti's rise to boss of the Gambino crime family.

== Drug bust and arrest ==
On June 28, 1987, Rampino was arrested for selling $30,000 worth of heroin to an undercover police officer in Ozone Park, Queens. He was sentenced to twenty-five years in a federal prison for the criminal sale of a controlled substance in the first degree, which carries a sentence of fifteen years to life in prison. His bail was set at $150,000.

== Death ==
Suffering from heart and respiratory problems, Rampino was admitted to St. Luke's Hospital in New Hartford, New York on December 4, 2010, where he died 16 days later.
