= Ravenite Social Club =

Italian American heritage club and mob hangout

- Interactive map of Ravenite Social Club
- Former names: Raven Knights Social Club (1919–1955)
- Address: 247 Mulberry Street
- Location: Little Italy, New York City, New York, USA
- Coordinates: 40.723069°N 73.996172°W
- Owner: Carlo Gambino (1957–1960s); Aniello Dellacroce (1960s–1980s)
- Type: Social club

Construction
- Opened: 1926
- Closed: 1993

The Ravenite Social Club was an Italian American heritage club at 247 Mulberry Street, in Little Italy, New York City. It was used as a mob hangout and the storefront later became a shoe store, and as of 2022 is a men's clothing store.

The Ravenite is sometimes identified as the successor to the Alto Knights Social Club, however, the latter was two blocks away from the Ravenite at 86 Kenmare Street. The two clubs existed concurrently.

== History ==
The club was founded in 1919, first as the Raven Knights Social Club, and later became a hangout for John Gotti and others. In the 1950s, Carlo Gambino took over and renamed the club "The Ravenite." Although some sources say he named it in honor of his favorite poem by Edgar Allan Poe, "The Raven," the club started as the Raven Knights before Gambino came to America in 1921. Gambino stopped frequenting the club when he discovered police had a growing interest in surveillance of the club. It then became under the management of Aniello Dellacroce.

It was frequented and used as the headquarters of the Gambino crime family in the late 1970s and 1980s. Around 1990, the Federal Bureau of Investigation was able to infiltrate the Mafia using covert electronic surveillance, because John Gotti used an apartment above the Ravenite; the FBI subsequently sent agents to install voice recorders and other wiretaps inside the apartment. The FBI then used recordings from secret Mafia meetings in that apartment against Gotti. Exterior surveillance also recorded numerous union officials outside the Ravenite, helping the FBI in connecting the boss of the Gambino crime family to the city's labor unions.
