= Joseph Biondo =

Italian-American mobster

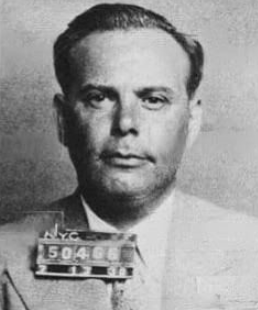
- Born: Giuseppe Biondo; April 16, 1897; Barcellona Pozzo di Gotto, Sicily
- Died: June 10, 1966 (aged 69); New York City, U.S.
- Resting place: Maple Grove Cemetery, Queens, New York, U.S.
- Other names: JB; Joe Bandy; Joe the Blonde; Little Rabbit
- Occupation: Mobster
- Known for: Underboss of the Gambino crime family
- Spouse: Louise Volpe
- Allegiance: Gambino crime family
- Criminal charges: Extortion; Murder; Illegal possession Narcotics related charges
- Penalty: Probation (for possessing a firearm)

Joseph Biondo (born Giuseppe Biondo, Italian: [dʒuˈzɛppe ˈbjondo]; April 16, 1897, Barcellona Pozzo di Gotto, Italy – June 10, 1966, New York City; pronounced "bee-ON-doh") also known as "JB", "Joe Bandy", "Joe the Blonde", and "Little Rabbit", was a New York City mobster with the Gambino crime family who was heavily involved in gambling activities. Biondo was also the family underboss for approximately eight years.

== Career ==
Born in Barcellona Pozzo di Gotto in Sicily, Biondo emigrated to the US. He lived on New York's Lower East Side, where he became involved with future top Cosa Nostra members. Biondo lived in the Jackson Heights section of Queens and owned a stately summer cottage in Long Beach, New York. He was married to Louise Volpe.

Biondo's early criminal record included arrests for extortion, homicide, and illegal firearms possession. He was known to be a soldier in the Salvatore D'Aquila mafia family and was a bootlegging confederate of Umberto Valenti. In 1919, Biondo was convicted on a narcotics charge. In August 1922, Biondo was indicted on murder charges from a gang fight in which another gangster died, but the charge was later dismissed. In 1930, he was convicted of possessing a revolver and received a sentence of probation.

During the Prohibition era, Biondo was involved in bootlegging. Biondo became close associates with bootlegger Dutch Schultz and mobster Charles "Lucky" Luciano, and frequently served as an intermediary between them. In 1931, Biondo assisted Luciano in the assassination of Cosa Nostra boss Salvatore Maranzano.

With the repeal of Prohibition, Biondo moved into labor racketeering in the taxi cab industry. During the 1930s, Biondo was close to the top, but stayed away from top position. Biondo owned a shipping business in Queens, a real estate office in Long Beach, and an automobile dealership in Flatbush, Brooklyn.

In early 1938, Biondo was indicted on charges of extorting payments from taxicab companies. On July 13, 1938, a New York Police Department (NYPD) detective arrested Biondo in Queens after observing him driving with a female companion. Biondo cooperated in the arrest and was sent to jail. On June 24, 1942, a judge dismissed Biondo's 1938 indictment because none of the indicted men had been brought to trial.

In 1957, Biondo and underboss Carlo Gambino conspired to assassinate family boss Albert Anastasia in a Manhattan barber shop. When Gambino took over after Anastasia's death, he appointed Biondo as underboss.

In 1965, Gambino became dissatisfied with Biondo's independence and replaced him as underboss with capo Aniello Dellacroce. Working with mobster Sam DeCavalcante of the DeCavalcante crime family, Biondo had gained a share of revenues from a sanitation landfill in New Jersey. However, Biondo hid this revenue from Gambino to avoid sharing it with the family. DeCavalcante later revealed the deception to Gambino, who then removed Biondo from power.

== Death ==
Joseph Biondo died in New York of natural causes on June 10, 1966. He is buried at the Maple Grove Cemetery in Queens.

== Family ==
Joseph Biondo married Louise Vope in 1934. They had no children.

American Mafia
Preceded by Philip Mangano	Gambino crime family Consigliere; 1951-1957	Succeeded by Joseph "Staten Island Joe" Riccobono
Preceded by Carlo Gambino	Gambino crime family Underboss; 1957-1965	Succeeded by Aniello Dellacroce
