= Thomas Bilotti =

American mobster (1940–1985)

- Bilotti's 1969 NYPD mugshot
- Born: March 23, 1940; Staten Island, New York, U.S.
- Died: December 16, 1985 (aged 45); Manhattan, New York, U.S.
- Cause of death: Gunshot wounds
- Resting place: Moravian Cemetery, New Dorp, Staten Island
- Occupation: Mobster
- Known for: Underboss of the Gambino crime family
- Predecessor: Aniello Dellacroce
- Successor: Frank DeCicco
- Allegiance: Gambino crime family

Thomas Bilotti (March 23, 1940 – December 16, 1985) was an American mobster who was briefly the underboss of the Gambino crime family in New York City. His promotion helped trigger the 1985 assassination of Gambino boss Paul Castellano; Bilotti was killed as part of the assassination.

== Criminal career ==
The son of Italian immigrants Lillian (née Rosso) and Anthony Bilotti, he was born on the Staten Island borough of New York City. As a young man, Bilotti became an associate in the crew of John "Johnny D" D'Alessio, a caporegime in the Gambino crime family who controlled illegal gambling and other rackets on Staten Island.

He later became a criminal associate of John's brothers Alexander "Pope" D'Alessio and Michael "Mikey D" D'Alessio. Bilotti also spent time as the chauffeur and bodyguard of Alexander "The Ox" DeBrizzi, an uncle of the D'Alessio brothers who controlled the Staten Island waterfront for the Gambino crime family. He further became an integral member of the D'Alessio crew and was involved in labor racketeering, extortion and loansharking.

In 1969, Bilotti was arrested on Staten Island on a felony charge of possessing stolen property. He gained a reputation for violence, such as in one incident, he assaulted Colombo crime family associate Robert Pate. The Federal Bureau of Investigation (FBI) agents Joseph O’Brien and Andris Kurins described Bilotti in the book Boss of Bosses: The Fall of the Godfather: The FBI and Paul Castellano as: "He was basically a pit bull with shoes on. If he had a business ability beyond choreographing a shakedown or calculating the interest owed on shylock loans, it didn't show. In a milieu not known for its conversational finesse, Bilotti distinguished himself by spluttering inarticulateness... He was short – five feet seven. He was stubby – a rock-solid two-twenty. He wore a bad toupée. He had no tact, no charm, no sense of humor. He had a big mouth, and his piggish eyes were too close together. To the concept of self-control he was a stranger". Bilotti was also a reputed hitman for the D'Alessio crew, and was allegedly involved in at least eleven murders.

Bilotti was a resident of 33 Kensington Avenue on Staten Island in April 1970, when he and an accomplice, Thomas Papanier, were observed discarding firearms and arrested following a shooting in Jamesburg, New Jersey. Bilotti and Papanier were apprehended as they ran from the scene of the shooting, in which African-American teenager Emory Parks suffered superficial injuries when he was struck in the back of the head by birdshot pellets. The quick arrest of the pair occurred as the Jamesburg area was in the midst of significant racial tension after riots at the local high school, and police from Spotswood and Monroe Township were on alert. Although police suspected that the duo were responsible for Parks' injuries, Bilotti and Papanier were initially charged with carrying a concealed weapon, carrying a pistol without a permit and failing to secure a permit to purchase a pistol. A Middlesex County grand jury ultimately indicted the men only for illegal possession of concealed weapons.

In 1971, John D'Alessio allegedly recruited Thomas Bilotti and his brother Joseph to murder Thomas "Tommy Edwards" Ernst, the common-law husband of D'Alessio's daughter Theresa. Ernst, who was in debt to two Staten Island mobsters, survived an initial attempt on his life at a Grasmere diner on August 31, 1971. He then agreed to meet with D'Alessio at the Wild Acres bar in Dingmans Ferry, near D'Alessio's summer home in the Pocono Mountains of Pennsylvania, on September 2, 1971. After leaving the D'Alessio country mansion on his way to the meeting, Ernst's Cadillac was overtaken by three men in a car who opened fire at him. However, this murder attempt also failed when Theresa D'Alessio, who was not supposed to be present, returned fire with a semi-automatic rifle. Ernst reportedly identified the two shooters to the Pennsylvania State Police before withdrawing the identification. Ernst was ultimately killed on April 6, 1972 when he was ambushed and shot twice by an unidentified gunman on the porch of John D'Alessio's home at 151 Jumel Street in Great Kills, where he had been making a visit to Theresa D'Alessio.

Bilotti's first wife Catherine died of cancer in her mid-30s, and he subsequently remarried to Donna, a Brooklyn beauty parlor owner. He had a severely autistic son who had been institutionalized since childhood, and although Bilotti visited the boy regularly, he rarely spoke of him. Bilotti was best man at the wedding of actor Gianni Russo, a fellow native of Staten Island. Another Bilotti brother, Jimmy, worked for the singer Frank Sinatra in Las Vegas for several years during the 1970s and 1980s.

=== Castellano protégé ===
Over the years, Bilotti became a close aide-de-camp and confidant of another Gambino capo, Paul Castellano, who reportedly saw much potential in the ambitious Bilotti and took him on as a protégé. He served as Castellano's primary chauffeur, bodyguard and enforcer. Although Castellano had worked hard to cultivate a sophisticated image, he chose the thuggish Bilotti as his protégé because he was "vigilant, hardworking, fearless, and, above all, loyal", according to O'Brien and Kurins. The agents described his traits: "As long as he was waiting on Paul Castellano, Tommy Bilotti was deferential, subdued, watchful yet calm, like a dog on a rug. His self-esteem derived from adoration of the master, and he could afford to be well-behaved. Problems occurred, however, when Bilotti was sent on errands of his own. Out of sight of the Boss, he got rambunctious. He tried to play the big shot; he overdid things. He got creative in a sadistic sort of way, and embroidered gratuitous cruelty through what should have been straightforward business transactions".

In one incident, Bilotti entered a Staten Island bar armed with a baseball bat to collect an interest payment from the owner, who was still recovering and trying to pay medical bills from a beating sustained weeks earlier. He berated the bar patrons and owner before unzipping his pants and ordering the bar owner to put his mouth on him, saying to the patrons looking on: "You see? He likes it". O'Brien was warned by Bruce Mouw, the supervisor of the FBI's Squad C-16, which was assigned to investigate the Gambino crime family: "Don't ever talk to Tommy Bilotti alone. He doesn’t play by the rules, [and he has a] very short fuse".

In an incident when O'Brien followed Bilotti to a beauty parlor owned by his second wife Donna, Bilotti left the parlor by a back door, entered another car and pulled up next to the vehicle from which O'Brien was carrying out surveillance and confronted the agent. Describing Bilotti's demeanor during the encounter, O'Brien said: "Now, most people, when they are building up to a fit of rage, need some give-and-take, some goading, to get them really psyched. Not Tommy Bilotti. When he got mad, it was like a nuclear reactor going into a meltdown. Once a certain threshold was reached, the process just fed on itself, the voltage increasing exponentially until the fuel was all used up and everything within a certain radius had been leveled. His voice got louder and louder, he made less and less sense. Soon he was just spitting out curses wrapped in random phrases, his face purple, his nostrils distended, ropy veins standing out on his pit-bull neck".

Following the death of Carlo Gambino, Castellano was elevated to boss of the Gambino crime family in 1976. Gambino's decision to appoint Castellano as his successor essentially split the family into two factions: Castellano's "white-collar" branch, and a "blue-collar" wing led by underboss Aniello Dellacroce. Bilotti was subsequently inducted as a "made" member of the family in October 1977, and his older brother Joseph followed suit in 1980. When Castellano moved into a custom built palatial mansion at 177 Benedict Road atop Staten Island's Todt Hill in 1980, Bilotti moved into a less ostentatious home nearby. He was a regular visitor and dinner guest at Castellano's mansion and was considered a close family friend. However, when Castellano started an affair with his live-in maid Gloria Olarte, Bilotti kept it secret from Castellano's wife Nina. Bilotti, along with Salvatore Barbato, also provided security for Castellano and his estate. Bilotti and Castellano regularly vacationed together at Pompano Beach, Florida. Castellano promoted Bilotti to capo in the fall of 1981, and he oversaw a crew of soldati ("soldiers") that included his brother Joseph Bilotti and John Gambino.

In addition to maintaining a large loansharking book, Bilotti was granted lucrative new business ventures by Castellano. The pair were partners in Scara-Mix, a concrete-supply company headquartered at 2537 Richmond Terrace in West New Brighton which continuously won profitable contracts. The company obtained more than $2 million in subcontracts on city and Transit Authority construction projects between 1984 and 1986 alone. Paul's son Philip Castellano was installed as president of Scara-Mix, and Bilotti served as the company's vice president, overseeing day-to-day activities on various construction projects in New York City and New Jersey in which the Gambino crime family had an interest. He was also heavily involved in the Steam Fitters Local 638 of the Plumbers Union that was represented by George Daly, an associate who belonged to Bilotti's crew. Daly served as Local 638's business agent until his 1987 conviction for soliciting bribes to ensure labor peace.

=== Conspiracy ===
Aniello Dellacroce's death from cancer on December 2, 1985 started a chain of events that led to Castellano's murder two weeks later. A group of Gambino mobsters, including members of Dellacroce's faction as well as onetime Castellano loyalists, conspired to assassinate Castellano and supplant him with John Gotti as head of the family. The main conspirators who composed the dissident faction were Gotti, Joseph "Joe Piney" Armone, Frank "Frankie D" DeCicco, Robert "DB" DiBernardo and Salvatore "Sammy the Bull" Gravano – collectively known as "the fist". Several factors contributed to the conspiracy to kill Castellano; his failure to attend Dellacroce's wake was an insult to the Dellacroce family and his followers. Secondly, Castellano named his bodyguard Bilotti as the new underboss, a decision which caused insult to other members of the family who felt they were more deserving of the position. Castellano also hinted that he planned on breaking up Gotti's crew over rumors of drug dealing.

Gravano suggested killing both Castellano and Bilotti while they were eating breakfast at a diner. However, when DeCicco tipped Gotti off that he would be having a meeting with Castellano and several other Gambino mobsters at Sparks Steak House on December 16, Gotti and the other conspirators decided to kill him then.

== Death ==
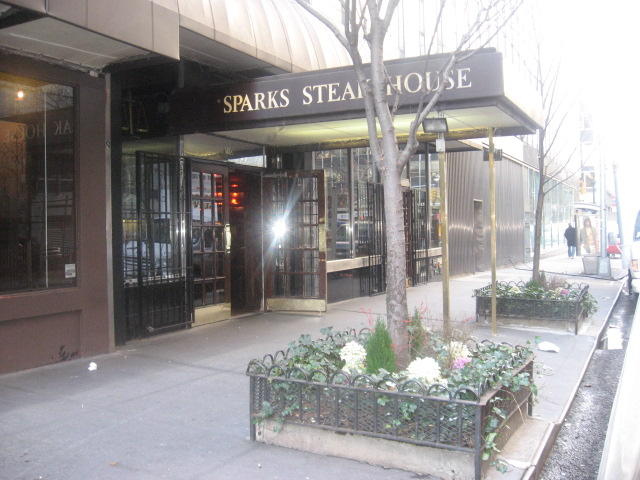
Sparks Steak House entrance at 210 East 46th Street

On Monday, December 16, 1985, Bilotti drove Castellano to the prearranged early evening meeting at Sparks Steak House in Midtown Manhattan, on East 46th Street near Third Avenue. A hit team (Salvatore Scala, Edward Lino, and John Carneglia) waited near the restaurant entrance; positioned down the street were backup shooters Dominick Pizzonia, Angelo Ruggiero, and Tony Rampino. Gotti, along with Gravano, observed the scene from a car across the street.

As Castellano was exiting the car at the front of the restaurant at around 5:26 pm EST, the gunmen ran up and shot him several times. Allegedly, Carneglia was the gunman who shot Castellano in the head. Bilotti was shot as he exited from the driver's door; before leaving the murder scene, Gotti drove past to view the bodies.

=== Aftermath ===
Bilotti is buried fifty yards away from Castellano in the Moravian Cemetery of New Dorp, Staten Island. He left behind ten children, including a six-week-old baby daughter; his wife Donna suffered a nervous breakdown and a miscarriage. Bilotti's lucrative loansharking business was taken over by Joe Watts, who was given Bilotti's shylock book as a reward for acting as a backup shooter in the Castellano assassination. His former home on Staten Island was later purchased by Steven Seagal.

Five years after Castellano's murder, Gotti was arrested by the FBI in late 1990 on racketeering charges, and denied bail 10 days later. On April 2, 1992, with the help of Gravano becoming a government witness, Gotti was convicted of numerous racketeering charges, including the 1985 Castellano and Bilotti murders. On June 23, Gotti was sentenced to life in federal prison, where he died of throat cancer a decade later in 2002.

Bilotti is portrayed by Richard Foronjy in the TV movie Boss of Bosses, Ron Gabriel in the 1996 made-for-TV movie Gotti, and Jerry Grayson in the NBC network TV movie Witness to the Mob.

American Mafia
Preceded by Aniello Dellacroce	Gambino crime family Underboss; December 2–16, 1985	Succeeded by Frank DeCicco
