= George Remini =

American mobster (1945–2007)

George V. "Big Georgie" Remini (August 5, 1945 – March 28, 2007) was a New York mobster known as "Fat Georgie" or "Big George" within the Gambino crime family. In 1969, Remini was arrested and pleaded guilty to possession of stolen property from interstate shipment and was sentenced to three years in prison. He married an Austrian wife. He stood at 6'2 and weighed 300 pounds with brown hair and brown eyes. He lived in Annadale, Staten Island. FBI Special Agent Joseph O'Brien describes Remini as having a "ruddy, unshaven face, blanched like a cauliflower... a hulking man, not fat but jowly, almost happy in a sloppy kind of way... with lank black hair... He was a small time loan shark and numbers man, proprietor of the Top Tomato fruit and vegetable stand at 4045 Amboy Road in Great Kills, Staten Island. He told O'Brien that despite rumours of having his produce delivery trucks loaded before his competition, he said, "You get your ass out of bed at three A.M. to be at the market by four. You push harder than the Koreans and you scream louder than the Puerto Ricans. And that's how you get fresh goods." A made member of Thomas Gambino's "crew", Remini formerly maintained an interest in the Top Tomato food chain, based in Staten Island, New York.

On March 28, 2007, George Remini died of old age beside his pet dog.
