= Frank DeCicco =

American mobster (1935–1986)

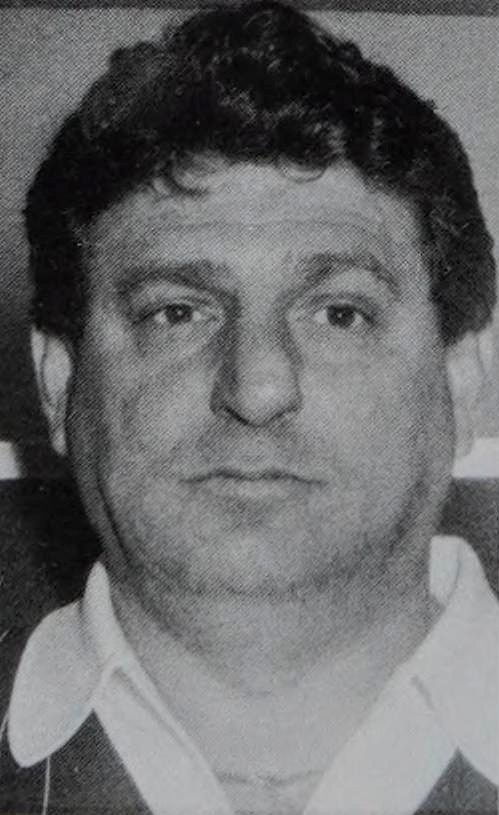
- DeCicco in 1984
- Born: November 5, 1935; New York City, New York, U.S.
- Died: April 13, 1986 (aged 50); New York City, New York, U.S.
- Cause of death: Murder by car bomb
- Resting place: Moravian Cemetery
- Other names: "Frankie Cheech"; "Frankie D"
- Occupation: Mobster
- Spouse: Rosemarie Suriani DeCicco
- Children: 2
- Relatives: George DeCicco (brother)
- Allegiance: Gambino crime family

Frank DeCicco (November 5, 1935 – April 13, 1986), also known as "Frankie D" and "Frankie Cheech", was an American mobster and eventual underboss for the Gambino crime family in New York City.

== Criminal career ==
The son of Vincent "Boozy" DeCicco from Benevento, Campania, an alcoholic soldier with the Gambino crime family, DeCicco grew up in Bath Beach, Brooklyn, but lived as an adult on Staten Island.

Frank DeCicco's brother was Gambino soldier George DeCicco and his sister was Betty DeCicco. Frank's uncle was Gambino capo George DeCicco. Frank had two children, Vincent and Grace. Vincent died of lung cancer in 2008. Frank's nephew was Gambino mobster Robert DeCicco.

DeCicco was a tall, muscular man with a thick neck that showed exposed thick arteries when he was angry. He dyed his silver hair black, leaving silver streaks styled in a pompadour coif. He also had a slightly mashed nose. A low-profile mobster, DeCicco drove a non-descript 1985 Buick Electra. Frank was a disorganized man who stuffed dozens of business cards in his suit jacket and kept a messy car. Former underboss and government witness Salvatore "Sammy the Bull" Gravano described DeCicco as being calculating and observant. Gambino boss Paul Castellano once commented on DeCicco to Gravano; "Frankie? Frank's a gambler. He's a street dog, Sammy." A successful gambler who played craps games or roulette, DeCicco frequented many illegal gambling establishments in Brooklyn and Manhattan and owned his own social club in Bensonhurst, Brooklyn.

=== Castellano protégé ===
DeCicco's mugshot

In the late 1960s to early 1970s, DeCicco joined the Gambino family and soon became a "soldier". In 1973, DeCicco and future Lucchese crime family underboss Anthony "Gaspipe" Casso were robbing diamond dealers and hijacking trucks throughout New York State. DeCicco eventually became a protégé of boss Paul Castellano, also a Bath Beach native. He was also close to Gambino caporegime James "Jimmy Brown" Failla, whom he described as his "rabbi". DeCicco's crew was one of the most powerful in the Gambino family and included associates Joseph "Joe the German" Watts, John Gotti's chauffeur and bodyguard, and Joseph "Old Man" Paruta.

DeCicco became heavily involved in labor racketeering with the International Brotherhood of Teamsters (IBT) Union Local 282. Through Castellano, he held a no-show IBT union official position with the Local 282. The members of Local 282 delivered concrete and building materials to construction sites in New York City and Long Island. Although paid overtime, DeCicco was rarely present at any construction sites. He installed many Gambino members into the Local and was responsible for delivering payoffs from union bosses to the Gambino administration. DeCicco often attended meetings at Castellano's opulent Todt Hill, Staten Island mansion.

=== Scibetta and DeMeo murders ===
In 1978, Castellano allegedly ordered the murder of Gambino associate Nicholas "Little Nicky" Scibetta. A cocaine and alcohol user, Scibetta participated in several public fights and insulted the daughter of George DeCicco. Since Scibetta was Sammy Gravano's brother-in-law, Castellano asked Frank to first notify Gravano of the impending hit. When advised of Scibetta's fate, a furious Gravano said he would kill Castellano first. However, Gravano was eventually calmed by DeCicco and accepted Scibetta's death as the punishment earned by his behavior.

In 1983, Castellano ordered DeCicco to arrange the murder of Gambino soldier Roy DeMeo. DeMeo headed a crew that had committed as many as 200 killings. By 1983, DeMeo was under heavy law enforcement investigation. Worried that DeMeo might become a government witness, Castellano ordered his killing. Given DeMeo's fearsome reputation, DeCicco found it difficult to find any family members who would take the job. Finally, DeCicco recruited Gambino associates Anthony Senter and Joseph Testa, both members of DeMeo's crew, to murder their boss. The two mobsters murdered DeMeo on January 10, 1983.

=== Castellano and Bilotti murders ===
In late 1985, DeCicco and John Gotti conspired to murder Castellano and his new underboss, Thomas "Tommy" Bilotti. Castellano had enraged many traditional family members with his fixation on white-collar crime and his perceived stinginess. When Castellano appointed his chauffeur Bilotti as underboss to replace the recently deceased Aniello "Neil" Dellacroce, Gotti decided to move against Castellano. Although DeCicco had enjoyed close ties with Castellano, he joined Gotti, Gravano, Joseph "Joe Piney" Armone, and Frank "Frankie Loc" LoCascio in the murder conspiracy. DeCicco tipped Gotti off that he would be having a meeting with Castellano and several other Gambino mobsters at Sparks Steak House on December 16. DeCicco and mobster James Failla appealed to Castellano to meet with the son of Dellacroce. Since Castellano had skipped Dellacroce's wake, this was a good way to make amends to the family. The dinner meeting was set for Sparks Steak House in Midtown Manhattan.

Just before 5:30 p.m. on Monday, December 16, Castellano and Bilotti were shot to death while exiting their Lincoln Town Car outside of Sparks Steak House.

Soon after Castellano's death, Gotti declared himself the new family boss and designated DeCicco as his underboss. DeCicco took control of all of the "white-collar" rackets that once belonged to the Castellano faction. Prior to the two murders, Gravano told DeCicco that he, not Gotti, should become the new boss with Gotti as underboss. DeCicco replied to Gravano,

John's fucking ego is too big. I could be his underboss, but he couldn't be mine. Look, he's got balls, he's got brains, he's got charisma. If we can control him to stop the gambling and all of his flamboyant bullshit, he could be a good boss. Sammy, I'll tell you what. We'll give him a shot. Let him be the boss. If it don't work within a year, me and you, we'll kill him. I'll become the boss, and you'll be my underboss, and we'll run the family right.

Gravano would later say in his autobiography, "Louie (Milito) had got pinched for something and was away for a short time when we made our move (the murders of Paul Castellano and Thomas Bilotti.) Frankie was steaming. Louie could have betrayed us if he wasn't in jail. He was playing both sides. As soon as Louie got out of jail, Frankie said he had to be killed. A guy like that was too devious. I argued for Louie's life. I asked Frankie, who was now our underboss, to let Louie come under me (Gravano's supervision). After all, we had spared people before. I would tell Louie what we discovered. I would put him on the shelf. I tried to convince Frankie that we didn't have to kill him. But Frankie was adamant. Louie had to die."

== Death ==
On April 13, 1986, DeCicco was killed in Dyker Heights, Brooklyn, when his 1985 Buick Park Avenue was bombed following a visit to Castellano loyalist James Failla. The bombing was carried out by Victor "Vic" Amuso and Anthony Casso of the Lucchese family, under orders of Vincent "Chin" Gigante and Lucchese boss Anthony "Tony Ducks" Corallo, to avenge Castellano and Bilotti by killing their successors; Gotti also planned to visit Failla that day, but canceled, and the bomb was detonated after a soldier who rode with DeCicco was mistaken for the boss.

In November 1997, author Jerry Capeci reported that Casso, now a government witness, revealed that the plotters selected Genovese associate Herbert Pate to kill Gotti with an improvised explosive device (IED). Casso told investigators that the plotters decided to kill Gotti and DeCicco with a bomb in order to make the Gambinos think that "Zips", or Sicilian mafiosi, were involved. Although Sicilian gangsters are notorious for using bombs, they have long been forbidden in the American Mafia since they put innocent people at risk. Casso also told authorities that Pate was selected because he had no links to the Gambino family and thus would not be recognized while staking out DeCicco.

=== Aftermath ===
Supervising agent for the Drug Enforcement Administration (DEA), Edward Magnuson testified that a confidential informant had told him that Gotti was, "very angry relative to the murder of Frank DeCicco, and when he was out on bail, or when the trial was over, there was going to be a war, and John would take his revenge." Gotti instructed all the Gambino made men and associates to attend DeCicco's wake, held over two days at a funeral home near the bombing site. To replace DeCicco, Gotti ultimately appointed capo Joseph Armone as underboss.

The Diocese of Brooklyn denied DeCicco a Mass before the burial, saying it should be delayed for the sake of the DeCicco family and to honor "the solemnity of the occasion".

He has been portrayed several times in films. In the 1996 TV film Gotti, Frank DeCicco is portrayed by Robert Miranda. In the 1998 TV film Witness to the Mob, Frank is portrayed by Frank Vincent. In the 2018 film Gotti, Frank DeCicco is portrayed by Chris Mulkey.

American Mafia
Preceded by Thomas Bilotti	Gambino crime family Underboss; 1985-1986	Succeeded by Joseph Armone
