= Moravian Cemetery =

Cemetery in Staten Island, New York

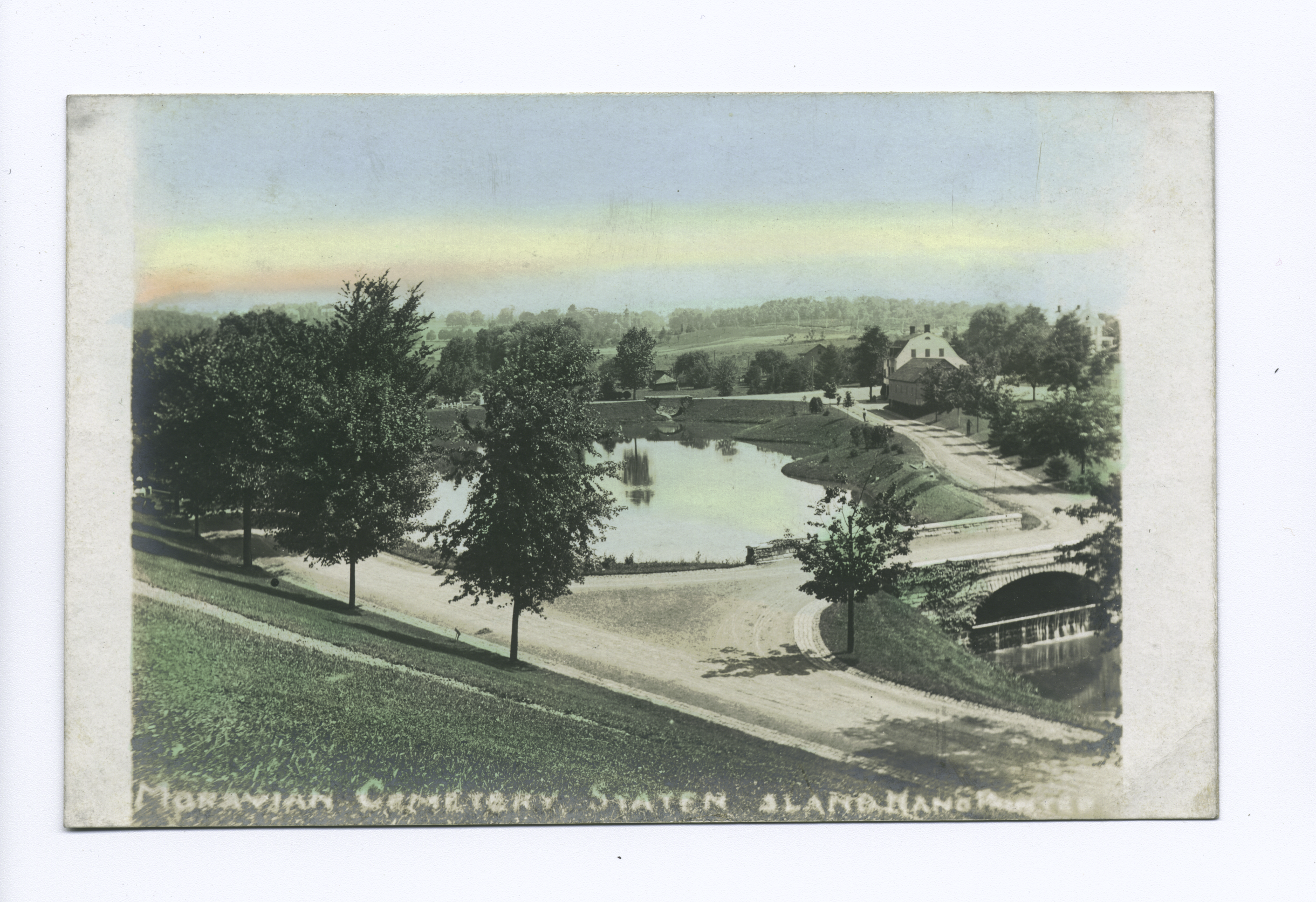
- Interactive map of Moravian Cemetery

Details
- Established: 1740
- Location: New Dorp, Staten Island, New York
- Country: United States
- Coordinates: 40.584°N 74.119°W
- Size: 113 acres (46 ha)
- Find a Grave: Moravian Cemetery

The Moravian Cemetery is a cemetery in the New Dorp neighborhood of Staten Island, New York, United States.

== Location ==
Located at 2205 Richmond Road, the Moravian Cemetery is the largest and oldest active cemetery on Staten Island, having opened in 1740. The cemetery encompasses 113 acres (46 hectares) and is the property of the local Moravian Church congregation of Staten Island. To the cemetery's southwest is High Rock Park, one of the constituent parks of the Staten Island Greenbelt.

== History ==
In what was a purely farming community, the 113-acre (46 ha) cemetery was originally made available as a free cemetery for the public in order to discourage families from using farm burial plots. After the closure in the 1880s of the South Reformed Dutch Church in Richmondtown, the graves of that church's graveyard were reinterred at Moravian.

A monument to Robert Gould Shaw, a Union soldier who led the first all-black regiment in the American Civil War and died in the Second Battle of Fort Wagner, was erected here by his family.

The Moravian Cemetery is the burial place for a number of famous Staten Islanders, including members of the Vanderbilt family. The director Martin Scorsese also has a burial plot here.

== Notable burials ==
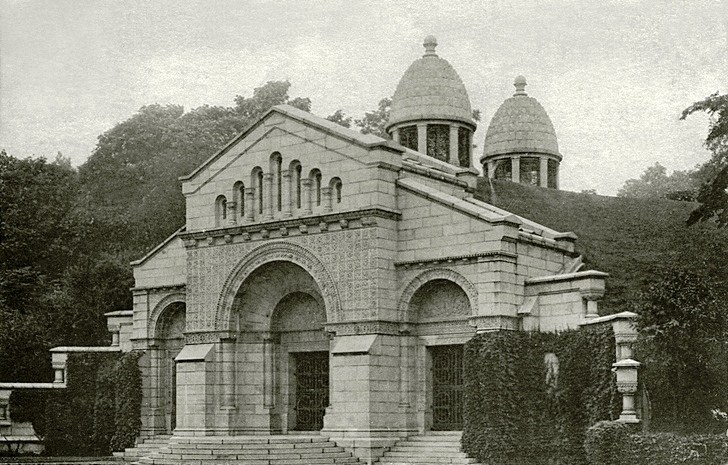
Vanderbilt Mausoleum

=== Vanderbilt Family Cemetery ===
In the 19th century, Cornelius Vanderbilt gave the Moravian Church 45 acres (18 ha) of land. Later, his son William Henry Vanderbilt gave a further 4 acres (1.6 ha) and constructed the residence for the cemetery's superintendent.

The Vanderbilt Mausoleum was designed by Richard Morris Hunt and constructed in 1885–1886. It is part of the family's privately owned cemetery, which is not open to the public. The Vanderbilt Mausoleum is a replica of a Romanesque church in Arles, France.

The Vanderbilt family cemetery's landscaping was designed by Frederick Law Olmsted. The Vanderbilt Mausoleum and portions of the cemetery were designated a New York City designated landmark in 2016.

=== Italian-American Catholics ===
The cemetery is the burial place of many Italian-American Catholics, even though it is a Protestant cemetery. This is due to the efforts of Father Ettore Barletta, who was in charge of the Italian Mission congregation at the nearby Moravian Church in the early 1900s. Catholic mafia families who had been refused a Catholic burial were offered burials in this cemetery.

=== Notable burials ===
- Mark W. Allen (1877–1958), businessman and New York state senator.
- Alice Austen (1886–1952), notable 20th-century photographer.
- Thomas Bilotti (1940–1985), mobster and underboss in the Gambino crime family
- Alfred Thompson Bricher (1837–1908), painter associated with White Mountain art and the Hudson River School
- Frank Cali (1965–2019), former reputed boss of the Gambino crime family.
- John Merven Carrère (1858–1911), partner in notable Beaux-Arts architecture firm.
- Paul Castellano (1915–1985), former boss of the Gambino crime family.
- John Celardo (1918–2012), comic strip and comic book artist
- Charles P. Clinch, playwright and government official who served as Collector of the Port of New York
- Frank DeCicco (1935–1986), former underboss of the Gambino crime family.
- John Eberhard Faber (1822–1879), German-born American manufacturer of pencils.
- Frank J. LeFevre (1874–1941), Congressman.
- Eddie "Cousin Eddie" Garafola (1938– 2020), Gambino crime family captain
- John A. Lynch (1882–1954), New York state senator and Staten Island borough president.
- Jim Mutrie (1851–1938), baseball pioneer.
- John L. O'Sullivan (1813–1895), journalist who first utilized in print the phrase Manifest Destiny to embody American expansionist ambitions.
- William Page (1811–1885), painter and portrait artist
- Anning Smith Prall (1870–1937), Congressman and Chairman of the Federal Communications Commission.
- Bradhurst Schieffelin (1821–1909), 19th Century social activist.
- Charles Scorsese (1913–1993) and Catherine Scorsese (1912–1997), father and mother of director Martin Scorsese
- Stephen H. Weed (1831–1863), Union general who died in the Battle of Gettysburg.
- Paul Zindel (1936–2003), notable playwright and young adult novelist.

== In popular culture ==
In the novel It's Superman: A Novel, the mother of the character Lex Luthor is buried in the Moravian Cemetery.

== See also ==
- List of United States cemeteries
