= Charles Carneglia =

American mobster

- Born: August 10, 1946 (age 80); Queens, New York, U.S.
- Occupation: Mobster
- Relatives: John Carneglia (brother)
- Allegiance: Gambino crime family
- Convictions: Racketeering, murder, conspiracy to commit murder, felony murder, robbery, kidnapping, drug trafficking, securities fraud, extortion (2009)
- Penalty: Life Imprisonment and fined $500,000 (2009)

Charles Carneglia (born August 10, 1946) is an American mobster in the Gambino crime family.

Carneglia was born in Queens on August 10, 1946. Charles Carneglia and his brother John owned a junkyard in the East New York section of Brooklyn that was reportedly used for narcotics trafficking, disassembling of stolen cars, and burying mob murder victims. John would allegedly remove jewelry from corpses prior to dissolving them in acid and then hang the baubles as trophies from the basement rafters.

During the 1970s, John unofficially adopted Kevin McMahon, a 12-year-old boy he discovered sleeping in his pool house. John served as a surrogate father to McMahon until John's imprisonment in 1989. After that, Charles supervised McMahon's activities as a Gambino associate. In 2009, McMahon became a government witness and testified against Charles. Carneglia was allegedly involved in the 1976 murder of Albert Gelb, a court officer, four days before he was scheduled to testify in a gun case against Carneglia.

During the 1970s, Carneglia became a trusted confidante of John Gotti, who was a rising star in the Gambino crime family. Brooklyn federal court papers filed by federal prosecutors contain allegations that Carneglia killed John Favara in 1980 and disposed of his body in acid after he accidentally hit and killed Gotti's son, Frank, with his car. On October 4, 1990, Carneglia and other Gambino crime family associates murdered Louis DiBono in his vehicle at the underground parking garage of the World Trade Center. In return for the murder, he received an initiation into John Gotti's inner circle. Five years later, Carneglia and John Alite were involved in a major conspiracy to murder John A. Gotti.

Alite agreed to testify in the trial of Carneglia in 2008. In 2009, Carneglia received a life sentence for four murders and Class-A drug dealing, amongst other crimes. As of May 2021, Carneglia is being held at high security prison USP Canaan in Pennsylvania, and has no release date. He is inmate number 08773-016.
