= Salvatore Scala =

American mobster (1944–2008)

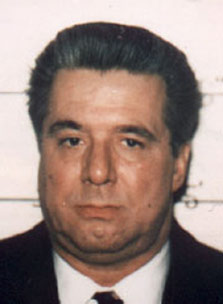
Federal Bureau of Investigation mugshot of Salvatore Scala

Salvatore Scala (1944 – December 30, 2008), also known as "Fat Sal" and "Uncle Sal", was a New York mobster who became a caporegime in the Gambino crime family.

Scala was born in Fort Lee, New Jersey, to first-generation immigrants from Scala, Italy. Scala was married to Grace Ann Lino, the sister of Gambino mobster Edward Lino and the paternal cousin of Bonanno crime family mobster Frank Lino. Scala was a nephew of Genovese crime family mob associates Carmine and Francis Consalvo, and a maternal cousin of DeCavalcante crime family mobster Louis D'Munda.

In 1983, Scala was arrested for heroin trafficking, but the case was dropped. A close associate of John Gotti, Scala was a suspect in the 1985 murders of Gambino boss Paul Castellano and underboss Thomas Bilotti that brought Gotti to power. However, Scala was never charged in conjunction with either murder. In 1999, Scala was promoted to the rank of capo and oversaw a crew of ten made men and associates.

On May 18, 2001, Scala was convicted of extorting money from the owner of Cherry's Video, an adult entertainment store on Long Island. Part of the evidence included an undercover video of a Gambino soldier visiting the store. The judge sentenced Scala to 63 months in federal prison. In March 2007, Scala was convicted of tax evasion and of extorting $2.5 million from Manhattan's V.I.P. Club, an adult entertainment venue. Scala was sentenced to 72 months in prison.

On December 30, 2008, Scala died in federal prison in Butner, North Carolina, from liver cancer. He had requested early release on compassionate grounds, but was denied.
