= Aniello Dellacroce =

American mobster (1914–1985)

- Born: Aniello John Dellacroce; March 15, 1914; New York City, U.S.
- Died: December 2, 1985 (aged 71); New York City, U.S.
- Resting place: St. John Cemetery, Queens, New York, U.S.
- Other names: Mr. Neil; Father O'Neil; The Tall Guy; The Polack
- Occupation: Mobster
- Spouse: Lucille Riccardi
- Children: 4
- Allegiance: Gambino crime family
- Convictions: Contempt of court (1971); Tax evasion (1973)
- Penalty: One year imprisonment Five years' imprisonment and $15,000 fine

Aniello John "Neil" Dellacroce (March 15, 1914 – December 2, 1985) was an American mobster and underboss of the Gambino crime family of New York City. He rose to the position of underboss when Carlo Gambino moved Joseph Biondo aside. Dellacroce was a mentor to future Gambino boss John Gotti.

== Early life ==
Dellacroce was born on March 15, 1914, in New York City to Francesco and Antoinette Dellacroce, first generation immigrants from Italy. He grew up in the Little Italy section of Manhattan. His nickname "Neil" was an Americanization of "Aniello". Dellacroce had one brother, Carmine. Aniello was married to Lucille Riccardi. They had four children.

As a teenager, Dellacroce became a butcher's assistant, but work was scarce and he took to crime. He was jailed once for petty theft. Dellacroce sometimes walked around Manhattan dressed as a priest and called himself "Father O'Neil" to confuse both the police and rival mobsters. Dellacroce allegedly committed a murder dressed as a priest. He also allegedly used a body double for some public events.

Aniello Dellacroce, which in Italian means "little lamb of the cross", was alleged to have taken pleasure in killing people. "He likes to peer into a victim's face, like some kind of dark angel, at the moment of death", according to a federal agent familiar with Dellacroce.

== Career ==
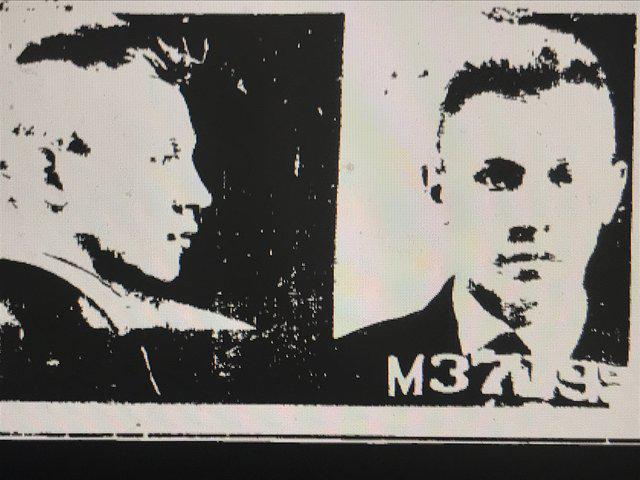
1930 mugshot of Dellacroce, sentenced to two and half years for store burglary conviction

In the late 1930s, Dellacroce joined the Mangano crime family, forerunner of the Gambino family, and soon became involved with underboss Albert Anastasia. After the disappearance of longtime boss Vincent Mangano, Anastasia became family boss and promoted Dellacroce to capo. Some Gambino members nicknamed him "the Polack", a nickname never used within his earshot.

Dellacroce later became mentor to John Gotti. Dellacroce bought the Ravenite Social Club in Little Italy, which soon became a popular Gambino social club and Dellacroce's headquarters. On October 25, 1957, gunmen murdered Anastasia in a Manhattan hotel barbershop. Carlo Gambino took over the family.

In 1965, Gambino removed the aging Joseph Biondo from his underboss position and appointed Dellacroce to replace him. In September 1966 he was arrested along with twelve others after attending the La Stella Restaurant meeting. All thirteen men were arrested and charged with "consorting with known criminals", each had bail set at $100,000. The sum total of their bail, $1,300,000, was paid the next day by a bail bondsman with no collateral. They were subsequently released.

According to records from the Knapp Commission, which investigated police corruption in a number of industries beginning in 1970, Dellacroce and other mobsters were involved in after-hours bars that catered to homosexuals in the West Village, Manhattan.

In 1971, Dellacroce was sentenced to one year in state prison on contempt charges for refusing to answer grand jury questions about organized crime. On May 2, 1972, Dellacroce was indicted on federal tax evasion charges. In return for labor peace, the Yankee Plastics Company of New York gave Dellacroce 22,500 stock shares worth $112,500. He was indicted on a failure to pay federal income tax on these stocks. In March 1973, Dellacroce was convicted of tax evasion and sentenced to five years in prison and fined $15,000.

On October 15, 1976, Carlo Gambino died at home of natural causes. Against expectations, he had appointed Paul Castellano to succeed him over his underboss Dellacroce. Gambino appeared to believe that his crime family would benefit from Castellano's focus on white collar businesses. Dellacroce, at the time, was imprisoned for tax evasion and was unable to contest Castellano's succession.

Castellano's succession was confirmed at a meeting on November 24, with Dellacroce present. Castellano arranged for Dellacroce to remain as underboss while directly running traditional Cosa Nostra activities such as extortion, robbery, and loansharking. While Dellacroce accepted Castellano's succession, the deal effectively split the Gambino family into two rival factions.

In 1979, he along with Anthony Plate, were arrested for the 1974 murder of a New York City bookmaker named Charles Calise. The FBI believed Dellacroce had ordered Plate to murder Calise because he was an informant. While on trial, Plate disappeared. The case ended in a mistrial.

On February 25, 1985, Dellacroce was indicted along with the leaders of the other New York Five Families as part of the Mafia Commission Trial. On March 28, 1985, Dellacroce, along with his son Armand and eight others, was indicted on federal racketeering charges regarding the activities of two crews in New York and Long Island. In June 1985, a Doonesbury comic featuring Frank Sinatra and Dellacroce together, and saying that Dellacroce was charged with the murder of Calise resulted in many papers not running the comic strip. On July 1, 1985, Dellacroce and the other New York Mafia leaders, pleaded not guilty to a second set of racketeering charges as part of the trial.

== Death ==
On December 2, 1985, Dellacroce died of cancer, aged 71, at Mary Immaculate Hospital in Queens.

== Posthumous ==
After Dellacroce's death in 1985, Castellano revised his succession plan, appointing Thomas Bilotti as underboss and making plans to break up Gotti's crew. Infuriated by both this and Castellano's failure to attend Dellacroce's wake, Gotti resolved to kill his boss.

A planned meeting of Castellano with other Gambino mobsters at Sparks Steak House on December 16, 1985 was chosen by Gotti as the opportunity to have him killed. When the boss and underboss arrived that evening, they were ambushed and shot dead by assassins under Gotti's command. Gotti watched the hit from his car with Sammy Gravano.

In April 1988, Dellacroce's son, Armond, died while hiding in the Pocono Mountains of Pennsylvania. He had been convicted of racketeering and had failed to appear for sentencing in March. The cause of death was listed as cirrhosis and a cocaine overdose.

== Media portrayal ==
In the TV movie Getting Gotti (1994), Dellacroce is portrayed by Peter Boretski. In the TV movie Gotti (1996), Dellacroce is portrayed by Anthony Quinn. In the TV movie Boss of Bosses (2001), he is portrayed by Dayton Callie. Stacy Keach portrays Dellacroce in the John Gotti biopic Gotti (2018), directed by Kevin Connolly and starring John Travolta as Gotti. In perhaps the film's most memorable scene, Keach as Dellacroce teaches Travolta's Gotti the names of the five boroughs of New York City. In the 2018 television series Kingpin (2018), Dellacroce is portrayed by Ralph Bracco.

American Mafia
| Preceded by Joe Biondo | Gambino crime family Underboss; 1965–1985 (shared with Paul Castellano 1974–1976) | Succeeded by Thomas Bilotti |
