= John Carneglia =

American mobster

- Born: May 21, 1945 (age 81); New York City, New York, U.S.
- Other name: Johnny Carnegs
- Occupation: Mobster
- Relatives: Charles Carneglia (brother)
- Allegiance: Gambino crime family
- Convictions: Racketeering and drug trafficking (1989)
- Penalty: 50 years' imprisonment and fined $75,000

John "Johnny Carnegs" Carneglia (born May 21, 1945) is an American mobster in the Gambino crime family. He was sentenced to 50 years in prison in 1989 for racketeering and drug trafficking charges.

== Early life ==
Carneglia was born on May 21, 1945 in Ozone Park, Queens. For years, John Carneglia was heavily involved in large scale drug distribution networks with Gambino mobster Gene Gotti, the brother of John Gotti, and Gambino capo Angelo Ruggiero.

John and Charles Carneglia owned a junkyard in the East New York section of Brooklyn that was reportedly used for narcotics trafficking, disassembling of stolen cars, and burying mob murder victims. John would allegedly remove jewelry from corpses prior to dissolving them in acid and then hang the baubles as trophies from the basement rafters.

During the 1970s, John unofficially adopted Kevin McMahon, a 12-year-old boy he discovered sleeping in his pool house. John served as a surrogate father to McMahon until John's imprisonment in 1989. After that, Charles supervised McMahon's activities as a Gambino associate. In 2009, McMahon became a government witness and testified against Charles.

== Murders ==
Law enforcement believes that Carneglia either directly or indirectly participated in the murders of Bonanno crime family capos Philip Giaccone, Dominick Trinchera and Alphonse Indelicato; Gambino boss Paul Castellano and underboss Thomas Bilotti; and Gotti neighbor John Favara.

In 1980, John Carneglia allegedly participated in the Favara murder. While driving in the Howard Beach neighborhood, Favara accidentally hit and killed Gotti's 12-year-old son Frank Gotti as he was riding a minibike. Carneglia and other Gambino mobsters allegedly abducted Favara from outside of his place of work in New Hyde Park, New York, murdered him, and placed his body in a barrel full of acid at the junkyard. Favara's remains have never been discovered.

In 1981, Carneglia allegedly disposed of the bodies of Giaccone, Trinchera, and Indelicato. The three capos had been plotting against imprisoned Bonanno boss Philip Rastelli. As a favor to Rastelli, Castellano allowed Rastelli associates to ambush the men in a Gambino social club, and then give the three bodies to Carneglia for disposal. Carneglia allegedly buried the corpses in a vacant lot close to his house in Queens. In 2004, children playing in the lot discovered one of the bodies.

In 1985, John Carneglia allegedly participated with other gunmen in the Castellano and Bilotti murders. The two Gambino leaders were ambushed as they exited a car outside Sparks, a Manhattan steak house. Allegedly, Carneglia was the gunman who fired the fatal shots into Castellano. A witness stated that he saw Carneglia shooting Bilotti as he lay on the ground. Carneglia's boss, John Gotti, had ordered Castellano's assassination so that Gotti could take over the Gambino leadership. No related charges were filed against Carneglia.

== Conviction and prison ==
In early 1987, Carneglia and Gotti went to trial on federal charges of loansharking, illegal gambling, murder, and armed hijackings. On March 13, 1987, all the defendants, including Carneglia, were acquitted on all charges.

Later in 1987, Carneglia and John Gotti's brother Gene, went to trial on the 1983 federal charges of narcotics trafficking, obstruction of justice, racketeering, and operating a continuing criminal narcotics enterprise. In January 1988, the judge declared a mistrial on this second case due to government charges of jury tampering. On July 27, 1988, in a retrial, the judge again declared a mistrial because jurors failed to reach a verdict. On May 23, 1989, in his third trial on the 1983 charges, Carneglia was convicted of running a heroin distribution ring. On July 7, 1989, Carneglia was sentenced to 50 years in prison and fined $75,000, the same penalty given to Gene Gotti.

He was released on June 11, 2018.
