= Paul Castellano =

American crime boss (1915–1985)

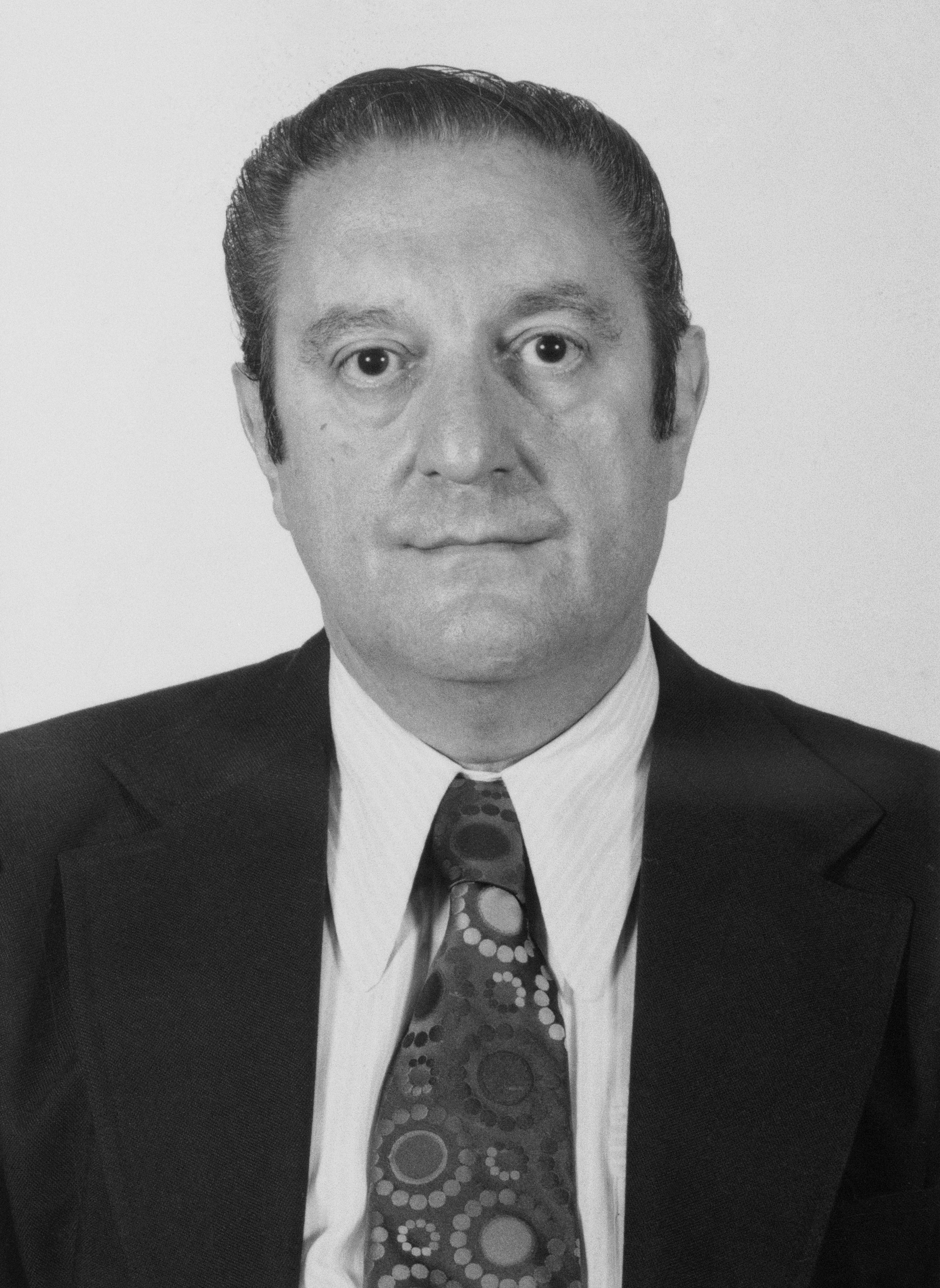
- Castellano, c. 1975
- Born: Constantino Paul Castellano; June 26, 1915; New York City, New York, U.S.
- Died: December 16, 1985 (aged 70); New York City, New York, U.S.
- Cause of death: Multiple gunshot wounds
- Resting place: Moravian Cemetery; New Dorp, Staten Island
- Other names: "Big Paulie", "PC", "The Pope", "The Chicken Man", "The Beak".
- Occupation: Crime boss
- Predecessor: Carlo Gambino
- Successor: John Gotti
- Spouse: Nina Manno Castellano (m. 1937)
- Children: 4
- Relatives: Carlo Gambino (cousin and brother-in-law)
- Allegiance: Gambino crime family

Constantino Paul Castellano (Italian: [kastelˈlaːno]; June 26, 1915 – December 16, 1985) was an American crime boss who succeeded Carlo Gambino as head of the Gambino crime family of New York City. Castellano ran the organization from 1976 until his murder on December 16, 1985.

== Early life ==
Constantino Paul Castellano was born on June 26, 1915, in the Bensonhurst neighborhood of Brooklyn in New York City. His parents, Giuseppe and Concetta Castellano (née Cassata), were both Italian immigrants; his father was a butcher and an early member of the Mangano crime family, the forerunner of the Gambino crime family.

Having dropped out of school in the eighth grade, Castellano learned butchering and collecting numbers game receipts, both from his father. In July 1934, at age 19, Castellano was arrested for the first time in Hartford, Connecticut, for robbing a haberdasher. He refused to identify his two accomplices to police and served a three-month prison sentence. By refusing to break the oath of omertà and cooperate with authorities, Castellano enhanced his reputation for mob loyalty.

Castellano's sister Catherine had married one of their cousins, future boss Carlo Gambino, in 1932. In 1937 he married his childhood sweetheart, Nina Manno; the couple had three sons and a daughter. Manno died in 1999. He was of no relation to actor Richard S. Castellano from The Godfather, despite claims made by Richard's widow after his death.

Hating his first name, Castellano often signed his name as "C. Paul Castellano". His first name at birth has been cited as both Constantino and Costantino.

== Mob life ==
Castellano joined the Mangano family in the 1940s. After Gambino was elevated to boss following the 1957 murder of his predecessor, Albert Anastasia, Castellano eventually rose to the rank of caporegime (captain). Soon afterward, Castellano attended the Apalachin meeting in Apalachin, New York, which ended with his arrest alongside 60 other high-ranking mobsters by the New York State Police. Refusing to answer grand jury questions about the meeting, Castellano spent a year in prison on contempt charges. On January 13, 1960, he was sentenced to five years in prison for conspiracy to withhold information. However, in November 1960, Castellano's conviction was reversed on appeal.

Castellano identified more as a businessman than a criminal, taking over non-legitimate entities and converting them to legitimate enterprises. However, his businesses, and those of his sons, still benefitted from ties to organized crime. In his early years, Castellano used his butcher's training to launch Dial Poultry, a poultry distribution business that once supplied 300 butchers in New York City. Castellano used intimidation tactics to force his customers, which included supermarket chains Key Food and Waldbaum's, to buy Dial's products.

As Castellano became more powerful in the Gambino family, he started to make large amounts of money from supplying concrete to New York's construction industry. His son Philip was the president of the Scara-Mix Concrete Corporation, which exercised a near monopoly on the concrete supply on Staten Island. Castellano handled Gambino interests in the "Concrete Club," a club of contractors selected by the Commission, the Mafia's ruling body, to handle contracts between $2 million and $15 million. In return, the contractors gave a two-percent kickback of the contract value to the Commission. Castellano also supervised Gambino control of Teamsters Union Local Chapter 282, which provided workers to pour concrete at all major building projects in New York and Long Island.

In 1975, Castellano allegedly ordered a hit on Vito Borelli, his daughter's boyfriend, over a rumor that Borelli had compared his appearance to Frank Perdue, the owner and commercial spokesman for Perdue Farms. In 2004, court documents revealed that Joseph Massino, a government witness and former boss of the Bonanno crime family, admitted to murdering Borelli as a favor to Castellano.

=== Succession ===
On October 15, 1976, Gambino died at his home of natural causes. Against expectations, Gambino appointed Castellano to succeed him over Aniello "Neil" Dellacroce, his underboss. Gambino appeared to believe that the family would benefit from Castellano's focus on white-collar crime. Dellacroce, imprisoned for tax evasion at the time of Gambino's death, was unable to contest Castellano's succession.

The succession was confirmed at a meeting on November 24, with a recently-released Dellacroce present. Castellano arranged for Dellacroce to remain as underboss while directly running traditional mob activities such as extortion, robbery and loansharking. While Dellacroce accepted Castellano's succession, the deal effectively split the Gambino family into two rival factions–Dellacroce's faction in Manhattan, and Castellano's faction in Brooklyn.

In 1978, Castellano allegedly ordered the murder of Gambino associate Nicholas Scibetta. A cocaine and alcohol user, Scibetta participated in several public fights and insulted the daughter of George DeCicco, a Gambino captain. Since Scibetta was Salvatore "Sammy the Bull" Gravano's brother-in-law, Castellano asked DeCicco's brother Frank to first notify Gravano of the impending hit. When advised of Scibetta's fate, a furious Gravano initially threatened to kill Castellano first. However, he eventually relented and accepted Scibetta's death as a punishment earned by his behavior.

That same year, Castellano allegedly ordered the murders of Gambino captain James Eppolito and his son, James Eppolito Jr. The elder Eppolito had complained to Castellano that Anthony "Nino" Gaggi, another Gambino captain, was infringing on his territory and asked permission to kill him. Castellano gave Eppolito a noncommittal answer but later warned Gaggi about Eppolito's intentions. In response, Gaggi and soldier Roy DeMeo murdered Eppolito and his son.

In February 1978, Castellano entered into an agreement between the Gambino family and the Westies, an Irish-American gang from Hell's Kitchen, in which the Westies were enlisted as hitmen for the Gambinos in exchange for protection from New York's other four mob families. The Gambino–Westie alliance was set in a meeting between Castellano and Westies leader James Coonan. According to Westies gangster Mickey Featherstone, Castellano gave them the following directive:

You guys got to stop acting like cowboys – acting wild. You're going to be with us now. If anyone is going to get killed, you have to clear it with us.

Castellano also forged an alliance with the Cherry Hill Gambinos, a group of Sicilian heroin importers and distributors in New Jersey, also for use as gunmen. With the Westies and the Cherry Hill Gambinos, Castellano commanded a small army of capable killers.

In September 1980, Castellano allegedly ordered the murder of his former son-in-law, Frank Amato, for physically abusing his wife, Castellano's daughter Connie, when they were married. According to FBI documents, DeMeo murdered Amato, dismembered his body and disposed of the remains at sea. The following year, Frank Perdue, the alleged cause of the 1975 Borelli murder, approached Castellano for help in thwarting a unionization drive at a Perdue Farms facility in Virginia. However, according to Perdue, the two men never made a final agreement.

At the height of his power, Castellano built a lavish seventeen-room mansion on a ridgeline in Todt Hill on Staten Island. Designed to resemble the White House in Washington, D.C., the mansion featured Carrara marble, an Olympic-size swimming pool and an English garden. Castellano engaged in an affair with his live-in Colombian maid, Gloria Olarte. He became a recluse and rarely ventured outside the mansion, requiring his captains to visit the residence to give information and receive orders. When not entertaining guests, Castellano wore satin and silk dressing gowns and velvet slippers around the house.

John Gotti, a protégé of Dellacroce, became deeply dissatisfied with Castellano's leadership, regarding the boss as being too isolated and greedy. Like other members of the Gambino family, he also disliked Castellano on a personal level, feeling he lacked street credibility. Gotti also had an economic interest: he had a long-running dispute with Castellano on the split Gotti took from hijackings at John F. Kennedy International Airport. Furthermore, Gotti was rumored to be expanding into drug dealing, a lucrative trade Castellano had banned under threat of death.

=== Legal problems ===
In January 1983, Castellano allegedly ordered the murder of DeMeo, who was found shot to death in the trunk of his Cadillac. Two months later, the FBI obtained a warrant to install secret listening devices in Castellano's mansion. Waiting until he went on vacation to Florida, agents drugged his watchdogs, disabled his security system and planted devices in the dining and living rooms. These devices provided law enforcement with a wealth of incriminating information on Castellano.

In August 1983, Gambino members Angelo Ruggiero and Gene Gotti (brother to John Gotti) were arrested for dealing heroin, based primarily on recordings from a device in Ruggiero's house. Castellano demanded transcripts of the tapes, and when Ruggiero refused he threatened to demote John Gotti.

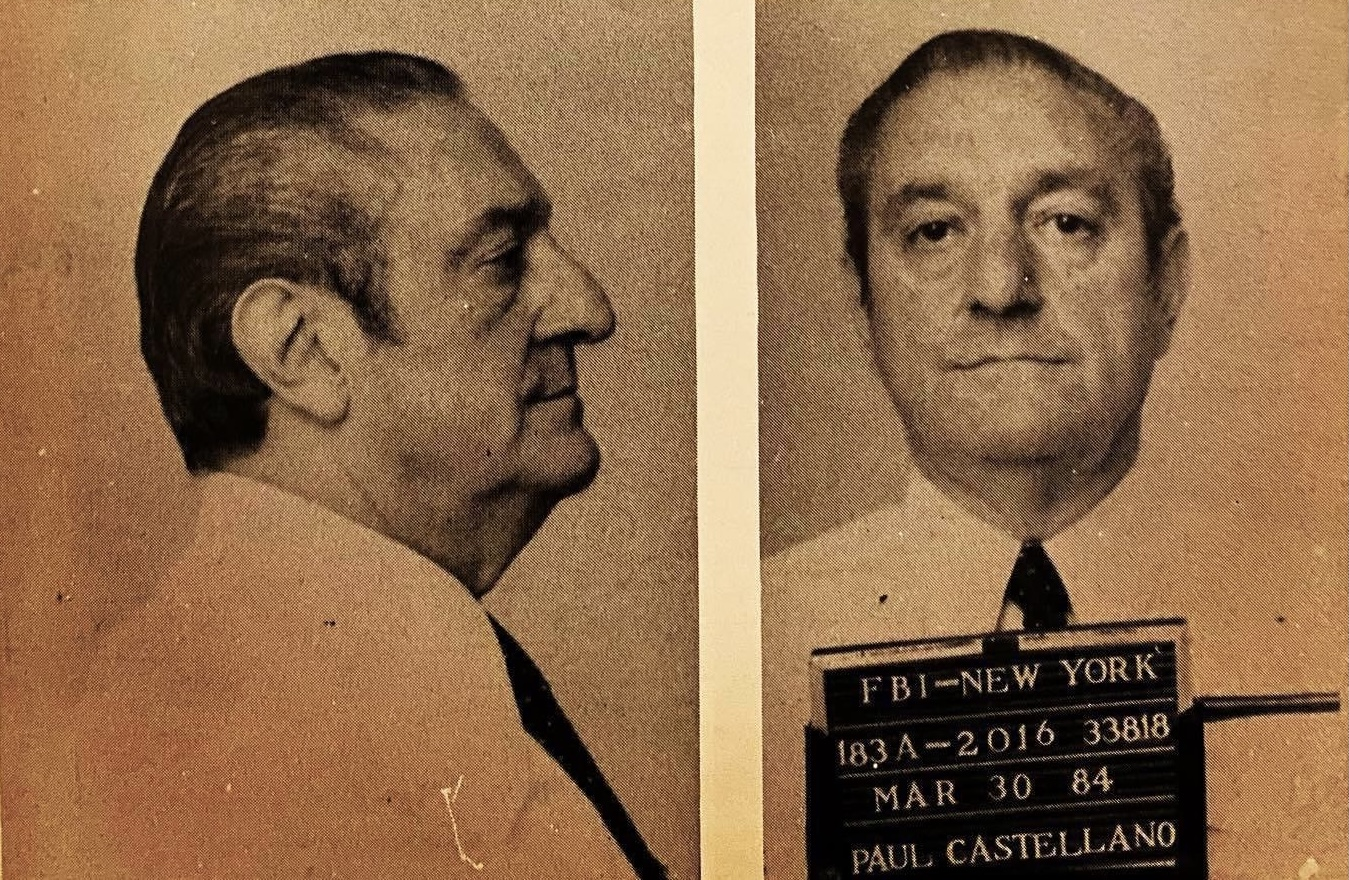
Castellano in a 1984 mugshot

On March 30, 1984, Castellano was indicted on federal racketeering charges, as well as extortion, drug trafficking, theft, prostitution and the murders of Eppolito and DeMeo. He was released on $2 million bail. Castellano's legal challenges mounted the following year, when he was one of many mob bosses arrested in what was to result in the Mafia Commission Trial; he was released on $3 million bail. On July 1 he was indicted on loansharking charges and with tax evasion for not reporting the profits from an illegal racket, and pleaded not guilty. On November 4, in testimony from Vito Arena, Castellano was named the head of the auto theft ring that employed Arena, as well as having been connected to five murders.

=== Conspiracy ===
Dellacroce died of cancer on December 2, 1985, starting a chain of events that led to Castellano's murder two weeks later. Castellano's failure to attend Dellacroce's wake was taken as an insult by members of the Manhattan faction, including Gotti. Then, Castellano named Thomas Bilotti, a loyalist with little diplomatic skill, as the new underboss. Castellano also hinted that he planned to break up Gotti's crew.

Gravano suggested killing both Castellano and Bilotti while they were eating breakfast at a diner. However, when DeCicco tipped Gotti off that he would be having a meeting with Castellano and several other mobsters at Manhattan's Sparks Steak House on December 16, Gotti and the other conspirators decided to kill him then.

== Murder ==
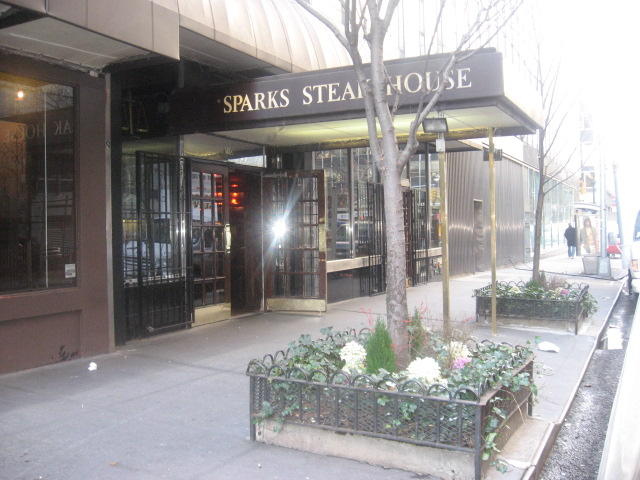
Sparks Steak House entrance at 210 East 46th Street, the scene of Castellano's murder

On Monday, December 16, 1985, Bilotti drove Castellano to the prearranged early evening meeting at Sparks Steak House. A hit team (consisting of Salvatore Scala, John Carneglia, Vincent Artuso and Edward Lino) waited near the restaurant entrance; positioned down the street were backup shooters Ruggiero, Joe Watts, Iggy Alogna, Dominick Pizzonia and Tony Rampino. Gotti and Gravano observed the scene from a car across the street.

As Castellano was exiting the car at the front of the restaurant at around 5:26 pm, the gunmen ran up and shot him several times with handguns and revolvers. Allegedly, Carneglia delivered the fatal shot to Castellano's head. Bilotti was shot as he exited from the driver's door. Before leaving the murder scene, Gotti drove over to view the bodies.

=== Aftermath ===
Castellano was buried in the Moravian Cemetery in the New Dorp section of Staten Island. The Archdiocese of New York refused to grant him a Catholic funeral, citing his notorious life and death.

Two weeks after the murder, Gotti was elected as the new boss of the Gambino family. Vincent Gigante, the boss of the Genovese family, was outraged that Gotti had killed Castellano without following Mafia protocol and solicited the help of Lucchese family boss Anthony Corallo in carrying out a hit. On April 13, 1986, a car bomb meant for Gotti exploded outside a Bensonhurst social club, but the only casualty was Gambino underboss Frank DeCicco.

Gotti was arrested by the FBI in late 1980s on racketeering charges and denied bail ten days later. On April 2, 1992, after Gravano decided to become a government witness, Gotti was convicted of numerous racketeering charges as well as Castellano's murder. On June 23, 1992, Gotti was sentenced to life in federal prison, where he died of throat cancer in 2002. No one else was ever charged in the Castellano murder.

== Media portrayals ==
- Jazz pianist Gene DiNovi portrays Castellano in the 1994 TV film Getting Gotti
- Richard C. Sarafian portrays Castellano in the 1996 HBO network original film Gotti
- Abe Vigoda portrays Castellano in the NBC network TV movie Witness to the Mob (1998)
- Sam Coppola portrays Castellano in the 2001 Canadian-American TV movie The Big Heist
- Chazz Palminteri portrays Castellano in Boss of Bosses, a 2001 film on the TNT network.
- Donald John Volpenhein portrays Castellano in the biopic 2018 Gotti, based on John Gotti Jr.'s 2015 book Gotti: In the Shadow of My Father
- Subject of the Fear City: New York vs The Mafia (2020), Netflix documentary

== Notes ==
American Mafia
Preceded by Neil Dellacroce	Gambino crime family Co-Underboss with Neil Dellacroce; 1974–1976	Succeeded by Neil Dellacroce
Preceded by Carlo Gambino	Gambino crime family Boss; 1976–1985	Succeeded by John Gotti
Preceded by Carlo Gambino	Capo di tutti capi Boss of bosses 1976–1985	Succeeded by John Gotti
