= Joe Watts =

Associate of the Gambino crime family

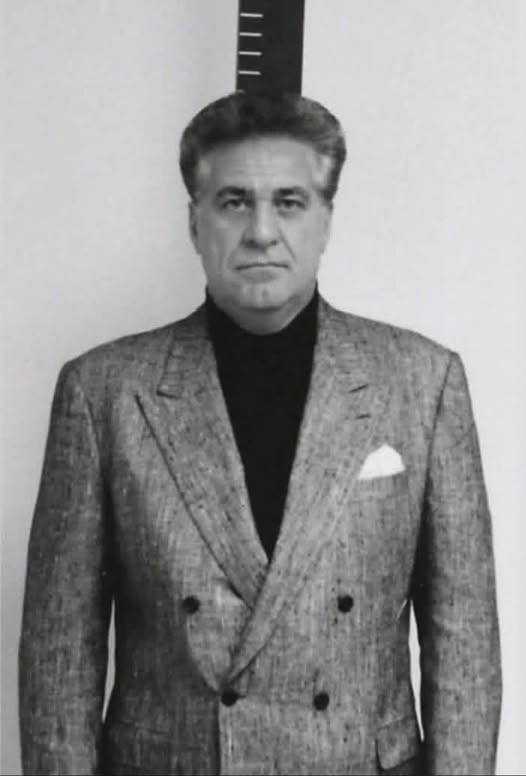
- Watts' mugshot
- Born: Joseph Watts; 1942 (age 83–84); New York City, New York, U.S.
- Other name: "Joe the German"
- Occupation: Mobster
- Allegiance: Gambino crime family

Joseph Watts (born 1942), also known as "Joe the German", is an American mobster and an associate of the Gambino crime family of New York City. He was a close confidant of former boss John Gotti and a participant in the infamous 1985 assassination of Paul "Big Paul" Castellano.

== Criminal career ==
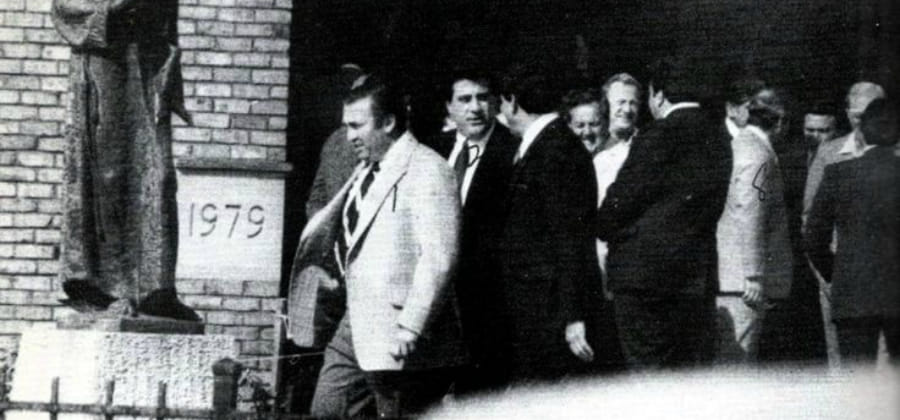
Watts (second from the left) with Gambino family soldier Roy DeMeo and Gambino family underboss Frank DeCicco in a 1979 FBI surveillance photograph

During the late 1950s and early 1960s, Watts was an associate of the Bonanno and Genovese crime families from New York, primarily active in Manhattan and Staten Island, and he became an associate of the Gambino family during the late 1960s, with connections in Hell's Kitchen and Lower Manhattan. It is believed Watts began his criminal career with the Gambino family during the 1960s under the reign of Carlo Gambino, and he may have met Gambino a number of times prior to Gambino's death in 1976. In 1973, Watts was identified as an associate of the Carmine Fatico crew in Ozone Park, Queens. Watts was ineligible to become a "made" member of the Mafia due to being Italian only by maternal heritage, with German and Welsh origins on his paternal side, although he was nonetheless afforded the respect of a capo, similar to Jimmy Burke in the Lucchese family.

Watts became a close associate of John Gotti and allegedly served as an enforcer and "hit" man for Gotti. According to The New York Times, Watts killed and occasionally tortured a number of victims between 1970 and 1995. On one occasion, Watts reportedly visited Frank Sinatra and Jilly Rizzo after Sinatra had refused a request to perform for Gotti and threatened to personally kill the crooner if he ever turned down the Mafia boss again.

According to the testimony of former Gambino family underboss, Sammy "Sammy the Bull" Gravano, Watts stabbed and shot former Gambino family associate, Augustus "Big Gus" Sclafani, to death in 1986 at a club in Little Italy, Manhattan as Sclafani was murdered for slander, accusing Frank DeCicco, whom was the underboss of the Gambino family in 1986, of being an FBI informant.

In 1993, Watts was indicted for the 1989 murder of Thomas "Tommy Sparrow" Spinelli, who was killed several days before he was scheduled to testify.

In November 1996, Watts was indicted for the kidnapping and murder of William Ciccone in April 1987. Ciccone had allegedly fired a gunshot at John Gotti outside of the Bergin Hunt and Fish Club in Queens. According to the testimony of former Gambino family soldier Dominic "Fat Dom" Borghese, Watts had tortured Ciccone with wooden boards and burned with cigarettes before he was shot 6 times in the head. Watts was acquitted in the murder in May 1997 by a Staten Island jury.

In June 2002, Watts agreed in a plea agreement to serve a 6-year prison sentence and $1 million in fines for money laundering after he had funnelled $2 million from his loansharking empire.

In April 2011, at the age of 69, Watts was convicted for his part in a 1989 murder conspiracy ordered by John Gotti, with the target being 49-year old Fred Weiss from New Springville, Staten Island, and sentenced to 13 years in prison, Watts was also sentenced to 3 years of supervised release and fined $250,000. Weiss was involved in a multimillion-dollar medical and toxic waste dumping scheme with the Gambino family. It is believed former Gambino family boss John Gotti suspected Weiss of cooperating with the government and he had ordered Watts and John "Jackie" D'Amico to orchestrate the murder of Weiss, including given tasks to Gambino family affiliates to dig his grave in preparation. Watts stood in the garage of a home in Staten Island, and held a gun, waiting for Weiss to arrive, however Weiss was not to be seen and he was subsequently murdered the next day. He served his sentence at FCI Cumberland, and was released from prison on January 14, 2022.

According to law enforcement and federal prosecutors, Watts has been linked to participating in 11 murders.
