= Carlo Gambino =

American mobster (1902–1976)

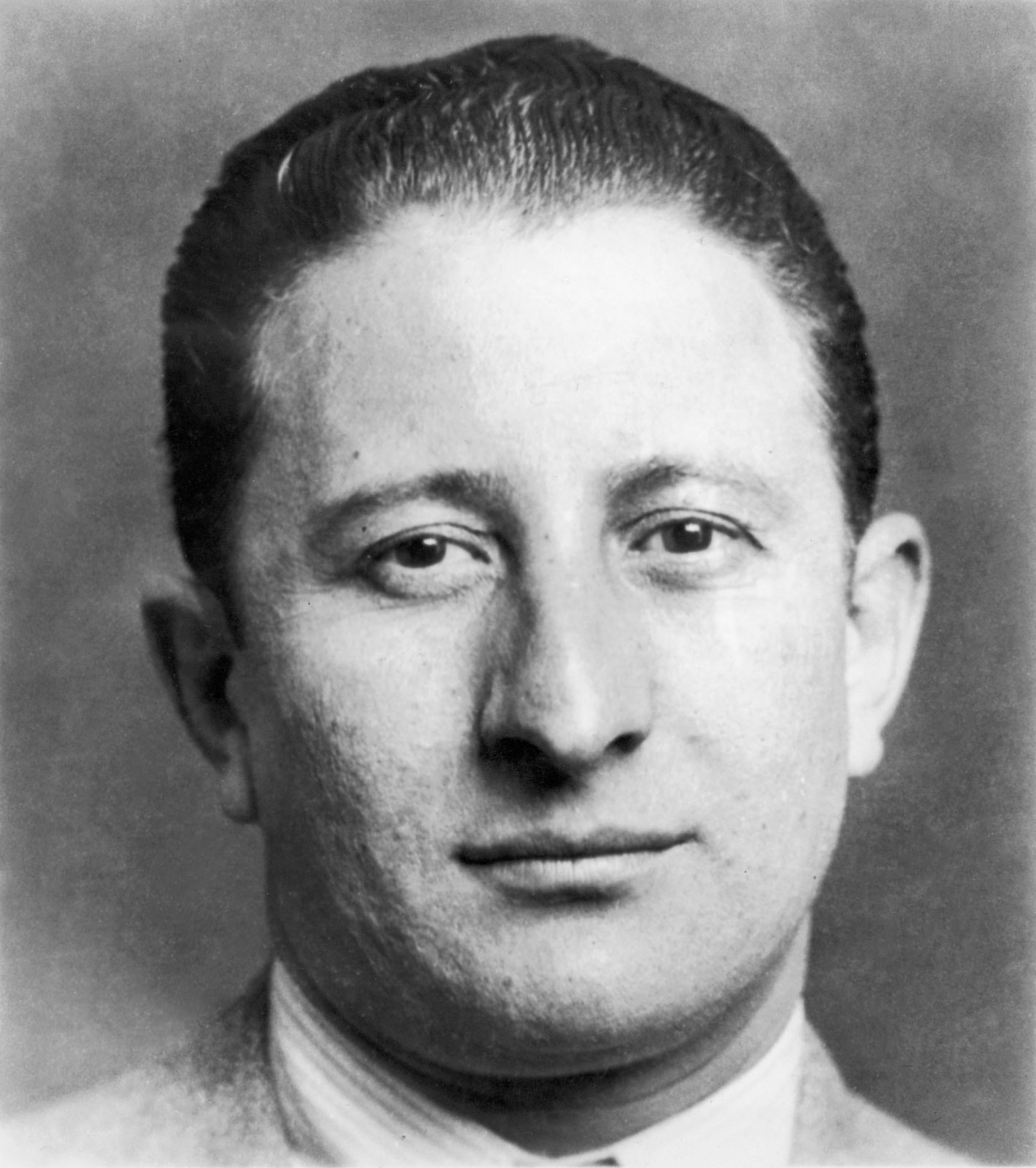
- Mugshot of Gambino in the 1930s
- Born: August 24, 1902 (Note: August 24, 1902, is a birth date most commonly used, however, September 1, 1902, is a birth date that has also been cited.); Palermo, Sicily, Italy
- Died: October 15, 1976 (aged 74); Massapequa, New York, U.S.
- Resting place: Saint John Cemetery
- Other names: "Don Carlo"; "The Godfather"; "The Boss of All Bosses"
- Occupation: Crime boss
- Predecessor: Albert Anastasia
- Successor: Paul Castellano
- Spouse: Caterina "Catherine" Castellano (m. 1932; died 1971)
- Children: 4, including Thomas Gambino
- Relatives: Paul Castellano (cousin and brother-in-law)
- Status: Deceased
- Allegiance: Gambino crime family
- Conviction: Tax evasion (1937)
- Penalty: 22 months' imprisonment

Carlo Gambino (Italian: [ˈkarlo ɡamˈbiːno]; August 24, 1902 – October 15, 1976) was a Sicilian crime boss who was the leader and namesake of the Gambino crime family of New York City. Following the Apalachin Meeting in 1957, and the imprisonment of Vito Genovese in 1959, Gambino took over the Commission of the American Mafia and played a powerful role in organized crime until his death from a heart attack in 1976. During a criminal career that spanned over fifty years, Gambino served only twenty-two months in prison, for a tax evasion charge in 1937.

== Early life and family ==
Carlo Gambino was born in Palermo, Sicily, Italy, on August 24, 1902, to a family that belonged to the Sicilian Mafia from the Passo di Rigano neighborhood. He had two brothers: Gaspare, who was not involved with the Mafia; and Paolo, who was a part of what would become the Gambino crime family. His parents were Italian immigrants Tommaso Gambino and Felice Castellano.

Gambino entered the United States on December 23, 1921, at Norfolk, Virginia, as a stowaway on the SS Vincenzo Florio. He made his way to New York City to join his cousins, the Castellanos, and worked for a small trucking firm owned by their family. Gambino later moved to a modest house located at 2230 Ocean Parkway in Brooklyn; his Long Island residence, located at 34 Club Drive in Massapequa, served as his summer home. The two-story brick house, surrounded by a low fence with marble statues on the front lawn, was at the end of a cul-de-sac in Harbor Green Estates, overlooking the South Oyster Bay.

Gambino married one of his cousins, Catherine Castellano, sister of future Gambino family boss Paul Castellano. They raised four children – sons Thomas, Joseph (March 28, 1936 – February 20, 2020) and Carlo Jr. (1934–2019) and a daughter, Phyllis Gambino Sinatra (September 22, 1927 – February 19, 2007).

== Criminal career ==
=== Castellammarese War and The Commission ===
In New York, Gambino joined a criminal organization headed by Joe Masseria, another Sicilian-born gangster. In 1930 he was arrested in Lawrence, Massachusetts, as a suspicious person. That charge was dismissed, but he was seized a month later in Brockton, Massachusetts, on a larceny charge. A warrant was issued for his arrest when he failed to show up in court. Four years later, Gambino was arrested in Manhattan as a fugitive and was returned to Brockton, where the larceny charge was dropped when he made restitution of $1,000.

By the early 1930s, Masseria found himself in a fierce rivalry with Salvatore Maranzano, the head of the Castellammarese clan, which eventually escalated into the bloody Castellammarese War. Masseria and Maranzano were so-called "Mustache Petes": older, traditional Mafia bosses who had started their criminal careers in their home country and believed in upholding the supposed "Old World Mafia" principles of "honor", "tradition", "respect" and "dignity". The Mustache Petes refused to work with non-Italians and were skeptical of working with non-Sicilians. Some of the most conservative bosses worked only with men having roots in their own Sicilian village.

When the war began turning poorly for Masseria, his second-in-command, Charles "Lucky" Luciano, saw an opportunity to switch allegiances. In a secret deal with Maranzano, he agreed to engineer Masseria's death in return for taking over Masseria's rackets and becoming Maranzano's lieutenant. On April 15, 1931, Masseria was killed at Nuova Villa Tammaro, a restaurant on Coney Island, ending the Castellammarese War.

With Masseria gone, Maranzano reorganized the Italian gangs of New York into Five Families headed by Luciano, Joe Profaci, Tommy Gagliano, Vincent Mangano and himself. He called a meeting of crime bosses in Wappingers Falls, New York, where he declared himself capo di tutti capi ("boss of all bosses"). Maranzano also whittled down the rival families' rackets in favor of his own. Luciano appeared to accept these changes but was merely biding his time before removing Maranzano. Although Maranzano was slightly more forward-thinking than Masseria, Luciano had come to believe that he was even more greedy and power-hungry than Masseria had been.

By September 1931, Maranzano, realizing the threat Luciano posed, hired Irish hitman Vincent "Mad Dog" Coll to eliminate him. However, Tommy Lucchese alerted Luciano that he was marked for death. On September 10, Maranzano summoned Luciano, Vito Genovese and Frank Costello to his office at 230 Park Avenue in Manhattan. Rather than show up to be killed, they sent a team of hitmen posing as government agents who murdered Maranzano instead.

Later in 1931, Luciano called a meeting in Chicago with various bosses, where he proposed the creation of a governing body for organized crime that would later evolve into the Commission. Designed to settle all disputes and decide which families controlled which territories, the Commission has been called Luciano's greatest innovation. His goals with the Commission were to quietly maintain his own power over all the families, and to prevent future gang wars; the bosses approved the idea of the Commission.

=== Mangano family ===
After Masseria's death, Gambino and his cousins became soldiers in the family headed by Mangano. Gambino was arrested in 1937 for tax evasion related to operating a million-gallon distillery in Philadelphia. He served twenty-two months in prison at the United States Penitentiary in Lewisburg, Pennsylvania, the only period in his long criminal career during which he was incarcerated.

Despite being a mob power in his own right, Albert Anastasia was nominally the underboss of the Mangano family. During his twenty-year rule, Mangano had resented Anastasia's close ties to Luciano and Costello, particularly the fact that they had obtained Anastasia's services without first seeking Mangano's permission. This and other business disputes led to heated, almost physical fights between the two mobsters.

In 1951, Mangano and his brother Philip were murdered, reportedly on the orders of Anastasia. Philip's body was found near Sheepshead Bay, Brooklyn, on April 19, 1951. Vincent's body was never found and he was declared dead by the Surrogate's Court in Brooklyn on October 30, 1961, ten years after he had disappeared. Anastasia succeeded Mangano as head of his crime family with the support of Costello, who had risen to leadership of the Luciano family after Genovese fled to Italy to avoid criminal charges and held on to that position after Genovese's return.

=== Anastasia murder ===
In 1957, Genovese decided to move against Costello and Anastasia, enlisting Gambino–Anastasia's underboss–in the murder conspiracy. Genovese ordered Vincent Gigante to carry out the hit on Costello, which was attempted outside Costello's apartment building on May 2, 1957. While the wound was merely superficial, this brush with death persuaded Costello to relinquish power to Genovese and retire. Although a doorman identified Gigante as the gunman, Costello claimed to not recognize him at Gigante's 1958 trial; Gigante was acquitted on charges of attempted murder.

With Costello gone, Genovese and Gambino allegedly ordered Anastasia's murder. Gambino gave the contract to Profaci, who then allegedly assigned the hit to Joseph "Crazy Joe" Gallo. Anastasia was murdered on October 25, 1957, in the barbershop of the Park Sheraton Hotel in Midtown Manhattan. Gambino subsequently took over the Mangano crime family, which took his name going forward. He appointed Joseph Biondo as underboss; he replaced Biondo with Aniello Dellacroce in 1965.

=== Apalachin and Genovese's fall ===
Shortly after Anastasia's murder, Genovese took control of Luciano's crime family from Costello. Seeking to legitimize his new power, he called a meeting in which leaders of both the American and Sicilian crime syndicates would be in attendance. Among the items on the meeting's agenda were the Mafia's interests in gambling and narcotics smuggling in pre-revolutionary Cuba, as well as their interests in New York City's garment industry. The meeting took place on November 14 at the home of mobster Joseph Barbara in Apalachin, New York.

Edgar D. Croswell, a trooper with the New York State Police, had become aware that Barbara's son was reserving rooms in local hotels and that a large quantity of meat from the local butcher was being delivered to the Barbara home. Suspicious, Croswell decided to monitor Barbara's house. When the State Police found numerous luxury cars parked at the estate, they took down the license plate numbers and discovered the vehicles were registered to known criminals. Police reinforcements came to the scene and a roadblock was set up.

When the mobsters discovered the police presence, they started fleeing the gathering by car or by foot. Many mafiosi escaped through the woods surrounding the Barbara estate; Gambino is thought to have attended the meeting, but was not one of the mobsters apprehended. The police stopped a car driven by Pennsylvania boss Russell Bufalino, whose passengers included Genovese and three other men. Bufalino said that Genovese had come to visit a sick Barbara, while Genovese himself said he had come to attend a barbecue. The police let him go.

Gambino and Luciano allegedly helped pay part of $100,000 to a Puerto Rican drug dealer to falsely implicate Genovese in a drug deal. On April 17, 1959, Genovese was sentenced to fifteen years in prison for drug offenses; he died in custody on February 14, 1969.

On January 26, 1962, Luciano died of a heart attack at Naples International Airport. Three days later, 300 people attended a funeral service for Luciano in Naples, during which his body was conveyed along the streets in a horse-drawn black hearse. With the permission of the U.S. government, Luciano's relatives took his body back to New York for burial at St. John's Cemetery in Middle Village, Queens. More than 2,000 mourners attended his funeral. Gambino, Luciano's longtime friend, gave his eulogy.

=== Boss ===
After Genovese's imprisonment, Gambino took control of The Commission. Under his leadership, the Gambino crime family had 500 soldiers and over 1,000 associates.

In 1962, Gambino's oldest son, Thomas, married Lucchese's daughter Frances. Over 1,000 guests attended the wedding, at which Gambino presented Lucchese with a $30,000 gift. In return, Lucchese gave Gambino a part of his rackets at Idlewild Airport (now called John F. Kennedy Airport). Lucchese exercised control over airport security and airport unions. As a team, Lucchese and Gambino now controlled the airport, the Commission, and most organized crime in New York.

In September 1966 he was arrested along with twelve others after attending the La Stella Restaurant meeting. All thirteen men were arrested and charged with "consorting with known criminals", each had bail set at $100,000. The sum total of their bail, $1,300,000, was paid the next day by a bail bondsman with no collateral. They were subsequently released.

=== Conspiracy against the Commission ===
In 1963, Joseph Bonanno, the head of the Bonanno crime family, made plans to assassinate several rivals on The Commission–bosses Gambino, Lucchese, and Stefano Magaddino, as well as Frank DeSimone. Bonanno sought Joseph Magliocco's support, and Magliocco, bitter over being previously denied a seat on The Commission after Profaci's death, readily agreed. Bonanno promised to make Magliocco his right-hand man in exchange for his assistance.

Magliocco was assigned with killing Lucchese and Gambino, and he gave the contract to Joseph Colombo, one of his top hit men. However, the opportunistic Colombo revealed the plot to his intended targets. The other bosses quickly surmised that Magliocco and Bonnano were colluding, and summoned both men to explain themselves. Fearing for his life, Bonanno went into hiding in Montreal, leaving Magliocco to deal with the Commission. Badly shaken and in failing health, Magliocco confessed his role in the plot. The Commission spared his life but forced him to retire as boss of the Profaci family and pay a $50,000 fine. As a reward for turning on his boss, Colombo took over Magliocco's family, which was subsequently renamed the Colombo family.

=== Health and deportation order ===
Deportation proceedings against Gambino were started by the Immigration and Naturalization Service as early as 1953, but made no headway for several years because of his heart condition and constant hospitalizations. In 1970 he was indicted on charges of conspiring to hijack an armored car carrying $3 million and was arrested on March 23, 1970. He was released on $75,000 bail and was never brought to trial because of his health. The same year, the U.S. Supreme Court upheld a 1967 order, that he previously appealed, that he be deported because he had entered the country illegally. When the government tried to carry out the order, Gambino was rushed to a hospital after he suffered a massive heart attack.

=== Colombo assassination ===
On June 28, 1971, Colombo was shot three times, once in the head, by Jerome A. Johnson at the second Italian Unity Day rally in Columbus Circle sponsored by the Italian-American Civil Rights League; Johnson was immediately killed by Colombo's bodyguards. Colombo was permanently paralyzed from the shooting and died in 1978.

Although many in the Colombo family blamed Gallo for the shooting, the police eventually concluded that Johnson was a lone gunman after they questioned Gallo. Since Johnson had spent time a few days earlier at a club run by the Gambino family, one theory was that Gambino organized the shooting. Colombo had refused to listen to Gambino's complaints about the League, and allegedly spat in Gambino's face during one argument. However, the Colombo family leadership was convinced that Gallo ordered the murder after his falling out with the family. Gallo was murdered on April 7, 1972.

=== Tommy Eboli murder ===
After Genovese's death, Gerardo Catena became the new boss of the Genovese family. However, he was indicted and jailed in 1970. Thomas Eboli then became the "front boss" of the family for the next two years.

Eboli wanted to actually run the family and borrowed $4 million from Gambino to finance a new drug trafficking operation. However, law enforcement soon shut down Eboli's drug racket and arrested most of his crew. Gambino allegedly ordered Eboli's murder. While it was initially thought that this was due to Eboli's failure to pay back the loan, it is now believed that Gambino actually wanted to replace Eboli with Frank "Funzi" Tieri and used Eboli's loan default as a pretext.

On July 16, 1972, Eboli left his girlfriend's apartment in Crown Heights, Brooklyn and walked to his chauffeured Cadillac. As he sat in the parked car, a gunman in a passing truck shot him five times. Hit in the head and neck, Eboli died instantly. No one was ever charged in this murder.

== Death ==
Gambino died at his Massapequa home in the early morning hours of Friday, October 15, 1976, aged 74, having watched the television broadcast of the New York Yankees winning the American League pennant the previous evening. The official cause was natural causes and his death was not unexpected, given a history of heart disease.

Cusimano & Russo Funeral Home hosted his wake over the weekend of October 16 and 17. His funeral mass was held on Monday, October 18, at the Church of Our Lady of Grace in Brooklyn. Gambino was then entombed within his family's private room in the Cloister building of St. John Cemetery in Queens. His funeral and wake were attended by several hundred people, with plainclothes police and FBI agents mingling outside. His funeral procession consisted of thirteen limousines, around a dozen private cars, and one flower car.

=== Aftermath ===
Against expectations, Gambino had appointed Castellano to succeed him over his underboss Dellacroce. Gambino appeared to believe that the family would benefit from Castellano's focus on white-collar crime. Dellacroce was imprisoned for tax evasion at the time and was unable to contest Castellano's succession.

Castellano's succession was confirmed at a meeting on November 24, with Dellacroce present. Castellano arranged for Dellacroce to remain as underboss while directly running traditional Mafia activities such as extortion, robbery and loansharking. While Dellacroce accepted Castellano's succession, the deal effectively split the Gambino family into two rival factions.

== In popular culture ==
- In the 1995 TV film Between Love and Honor, Carlo Gambino is portrayed by Robert Loggia.
- In the 1996 TV film Gotti, Carlo Gambino is portrayed by Marc Lawrence as the head of the Gambino family towards his death in 1976.
- In the 2001 TV film Boss of Bosses, Carlo Gambino is portrayed by Al Ruscio. He was shown from his early years in the Cosa Nostra till his death, when Paul Castellano was chosen to succeed him. His younger self is portrayed by William DeMeo.
- In the 2015 AMC mini series The Making of the Mob: New York, Carlo Gambino is portrayed by Noah Forrest.
- In the 2018 biopic Gotti, Carlo Gambino is portrayed by Michael Cipiti.
- He is portrayed by Anthony Skordi on the 2022 TV series The Offer.
- He is portrayed by Arthur J. Nascarella in Season 3 of TV Series Godfather of Harlem
- He is portrayed by James Ciccone in The Alto Knights

== Notes ==
American Mafia
Preceded by Frank Scalice	Gambino crime family Underboss; 1957	Succeeded by Joseph Biondo
Preceded by Albert Anastasia	Gambino crime family Boss; 1957–1976	Succeeded by Paul Castellano
Preceded by Joseph Bonanno as chairman of the commission	Capo di tutti capi Boss of bosses 1962–1976	Succeeded by Paul Castellano
