= Sparks Steak House =

Coordinates: 40°45′10.75″N 73°58′19.43″W

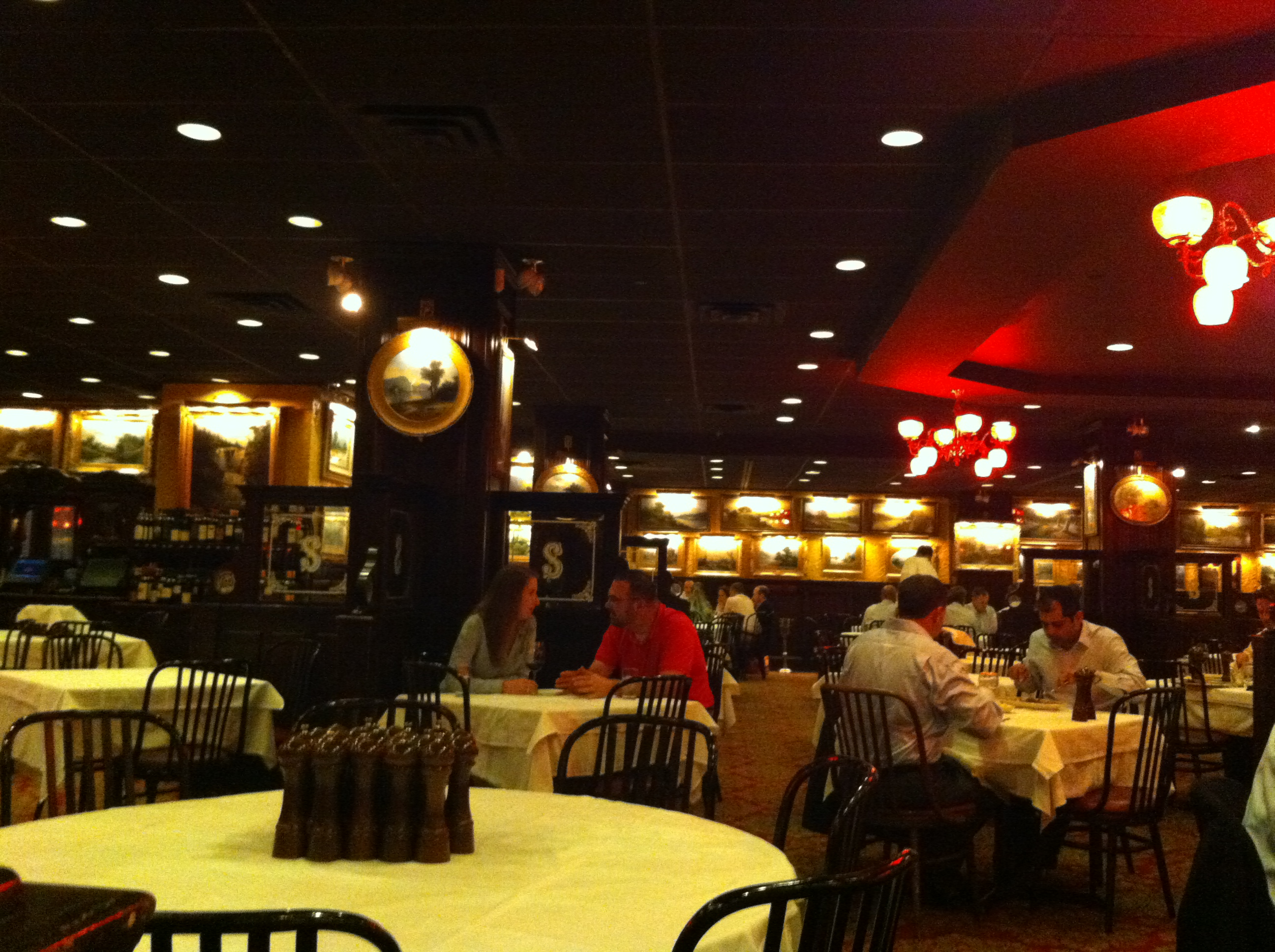
- Main dining area in June 2014
- Interactive map of Sparks Steak House

Restaurant information
- Established: 1966; 60 years ago
- Food type: Steak
- Location: 210 East 46th Street (between Second & Third Avenue) in Midtown Manhattan, New York City, Manhattan, New York, 10017, United States
- Website: www.sparkssteakhouse.com

Sparks Steak House is a steakhouse restaurant in New York City, located at 210 East 46th Street (between Second and Third avenues) in Midtown Manhattan.

== History ==
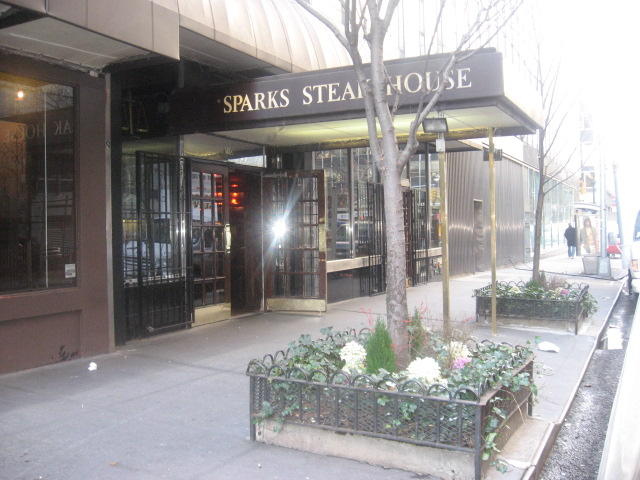
Entrance in 2008, at 210 East 46th Street

The restaurant was founded by brothers Pasquale (Pat) and Mike Cetta in 1966. In the 1930s, Mike and the Cetta family had immigrated to New York from Sant'Angelo dei Lombardi in Campania, Italy, eventually working as butchers and winemakers in New York City.

The two Cetta brothers purchased the Sparks English Pub in 1966 and decided to turn it into a steakhouse. The steakhouse was originally located at 123 East 18th Street but moved to its current location in 1977. Pat had a heart attack and died in his apartment on the evening of January 24, 2000.

In 1985, Gambino crime family boss Paul Castellano and underboss Thomas Bilotti were gunned down outside its entrance on the evening of December 16. The hit was given under the orders of John Gotti.

== Reviews ==
In 2003, Wine Spectator gave a Restaurant Awards to Sparks Steak House.

In 2004, New York Magazine gave it the award of the Best Places to eat in New York City.

In 2005, New York Magazine – Adam Platt's – Where to Eat.

In 2005, GQ Magazine voted Sparks Steak House in the top 10 Restaurants That Still Matter.

In 2007, Sparks Steak House is voted The Greatest Steakhouse in Manhattan by Yahoo.

In 2010, Sparks Steak House is voted one of the top 100 restaurants in America.

In 2013, Zagat gave it a food rating of 26 (out of 30), and ranked it the #2 steakhouse in New York City.

== See also ==
- List of restaurants in New York City
- List of steakhouses
