= Underboss =

Second-in-command in Mafia crime families

Structure of Mafia crime family

Underboss (Italian: sottocapo) is a position within the leadership structure of certain organized crime groups, particularly in Sicilian and Italian-American Mafia crime families. The underboss is second in command to the boss. The underboss is also person-in-charge of all capos and their soldiers. The underboss is sometimes a family member, such as a son, who will take over the family if the boss is sick, killed, or imprisoned. The position was installed within the Genovese crime family since at least the mid-1960s. It has also been used in the Detroit crime family and the Chicago Outfit.

The power of an underboss greatly varies; some are marginal figures, while others are the most powerful individual in the family. Traditionally they run day-to-day affairs of the family. In some crime families, the appointment is for life. If a new boss takes over a family with an existing underboss, that boss may marginalize or even murder the underboss appointed by his predecessor. On the other hand, if a boss is incarcerated, the underboss may become acting boss. As bosses often serve large periods of time in prison, an acting boss will often become the crime family's effective boss. Even with the boss free, sometimes the underboss will gain enough power to become the effective head of the organization, and the boss will become a figurehead. An underboss likely has incriminating information about the boss, and so bosses often appoint people close to them to the underboss position for protection.

In most families, the underboss arbitrates many disputes. Depending on the seriousness of the problem, he might consult with the boss. Some conflicts are immediately referred up to the boss. In those cases, the underboss usually sits in and offers his opinion. In either event, the ultimate authority rests with the boss.

An underboss receives monetary compensation in various ways. For example, he may be a partner in several rackets and thus get a cut. In addition, several capos may pass their envelopes through the underboss, who takes a percentage and passes the remainder to the boss. However he makes his illegal earnings, it is a significant enough amount to make his position one of envy, especially when prestige and the possibility of additional advancement are weighed. Sometimes an underboss will have his own crew.

Just like the boss of a family, an underboss may also have a right-hand man. This right-hand man may speak in place of an underboss or carry out additional tasks for the underboss.

== See also ==
- Boss
- Consigliere
