= Michael DeBatt =

American mobster

Michael "Mickey" DeBatt (pronounced Di-Bat; c. 1949 – November 2, 1987) was a Gambino crime family mob associate who was involved in the gangland slaying of drug trafficker Frank Fiala.

== Biography ==
DeBatt was born to first generation Calabrian emigrant Mackie DeBatt in Bensonhurst, Brooklyn who grew up in the same neighborhood as future friends and criminal associates Sammy Gravano and Frank DeCicco. He had one sister named Rosanna DeBatt-Massa. He was very close to his sister over the years. Michael is perceived to have been a "connected guy" with the Gambino crime family but never officially inducted into the organization. He performed various tasks for Sammy Gravano and others. Michael was the successful owner of Tali's Restaurant and Lounge located at 6205 18th Avenue in Bensonhurst, Brooklyn. It is also suggested that his father Mackie suffered from the psychological disorder of being a pathological gambling addict. DeBatt did not inherit his father's gambling addiction. Although he had a steady source of legitimate income from his restaurant, he became indebted to many loansharks and bookmakers around Brooklyn. It is also shown that Mackie was able to afford to pay for his son's tuition and send him off to college. After his death the mobsters started to threaten and muscle his wife to settle his outstanding debts. Although his father did not want his son to become involved in organized crime, DeBatt became a close childhood friend and acquaintance of budding Gambino crime family mob associate Nicholas Mormando, with whom he became involved in joint ventures after returning from his failed studies at Wake Forest University. Close friend, mob wife Lynda Milito, the widow of murdered Gambino crime family mobster Liborio Milito said in her biography, "Michael DeBatt wasn't being allowed to earn with Sammy. So Louis Milito took Mike under his wing and made him a bouncer at The Plaza Suite. He was a lost soul after the death of his father ... He told everyone he was taking over the bar out of the kindness in his heart for the family, because of the debts and by taking over he was wiping out the debts." He later worked at a short-lived restaurant called The Golden Gate Restaurant on Knapp Street in Sheepshead Bay, Brooklyn as a maître d', a restaurant owned by Sammy Gravano and Louis Milito.

DeBatt was a huge and intimidating man. His life remained financially unstable, along with Sammy Gravano's until he took over ownership of his father's restaurant and settled his late father's loanshark and bookmaker debts. Sammy Gravano later said, "For one week he (himself) would be flush with cash, but two weeks later he would be broke. He never saved any money. He shopped for clothes, picked up tabs at restaurants and night clubs, handed out huge tips and dined on champagne and filet mignon at the Copacabana. Sammy later said of himself, Michael and his young aspiring mob associates, "Fucking kids, all dressed up like jerk-offs, running around, doing a little gambling, doing a little this and that" and then broke again and it's "macaroni and ricotta at home or spaghetti, past e olio, with the oil and garlic."

In the 1970s, DeBatt married an Italian-American woman after returning from Wake Forest. They had a daughter in 1983. He moved into a home and lived with his wife and daughter at 1774 58th Street, not far from his restaurant and lounge, which he still operated. In 2001, when Sammy Gravano was brought to trial for being the ringleader of an ecstasy trafficking ring, his sister showed up in Federal District Court and told reporters, "I wanted to give him a little agita" and "I'm happy to see him in jail clothes. Anything he gets is a plus. It's better than the five years he got."

His father Mackie was a close friend of Sammy Gravano and Gambino crime family mob associate who became indebted to loansharks and bookmakers including and Sammy Gravano. Mackie died in December 1981 of natural causes leaving his wife, his son Michael and daughter Rosanna under financial strain and heavily indebted. His son Michael later stood up for his family and confronted the loansharks and bookmakers to protect his elderly mother and took on the sole responsibility of handling his late father's debts. Michael DeBatt's mother approached Sammy Gravano and pleaded with him, "Sammy, please help us." His father's friend and later personal mentor, became involved in the DeBatt family financial affairs at that point. He got rid of the threatening loansharks and bookmakers. He took over Mackie's bar to help settle the debt that DeBatt still had outstanding with himself. Along with working at Tali's Restaurant and Lounge he worked as a bouncer at Sammy Gravano's classy nightclub, the Plaza Suite throughout the 1970s to 1985 when The Plaza Suite closed. Eventually with the help of Sammy Gravano and working on his own criminal endeavours, DeBatt was able to settle his father's outstanding debts to the loansharks and bookmakers. He closed the bar down and remodelled before opening it up as his own with Michael as the "front man" and manager of the lease.

Michael DeBatt later became a habitué of Sammy Gravano's other after-hours club, the Bus Stop also located in Bensonhurst, Brooklyn. He became a protégé of Gravano's along with Joseph (Stymie) D'Angelo Sr.'s son, Joseph Jr.

=== Varsity football career ===
DeBatt's physical stature, endurance and strength earned him the reputation as an excellent athlete. During high school, he was a varsity football player who showed tremendous skill on the field. Unlike many of his criminal associates he successfully graduated from high school and had been awarded an athletic scholarship to Wake Forest University in North Carolina to play for the Wake Forest Demon Deacons football team. The Wake Forest Demon Deacons is an NCAA Division I Football Bowl Subdivision as a member of the Atlantic Coast Conference. While at the university he was trained and coached by Chuck Mills. It seemed that DeBatt would pursue a career as a professional athlete and not become involved in organized crime like his father.

He successfully played on the team for a while as a linebacker (in Witness to the Mob Vincent Pastore playing DeBatt says he was a tight end) but eventually left before earning his certificate or diploma and returned to New York City where he pursued a life as a career criminal in organized crime like his father had. It is unknown why he left Wake Forest University, whether it was from financial, academic or behavioral issues. He never discussed his failed university education among his criminal associates. It is unknown what field of study Michael had interest in pursuing at the university. As an avid football fan he would attend the minor league football games played by Frank Gotti, the son of Gambino crime family boss John Gotti along with Junior Gotti, Victoria Gotti and Peter Gotti.

=== Married life and fatherhood ===
DeBatt married an Italian-American woman from the neighborhood in the 1970s after returning from his failed tenure at Wake Forest University. His wife bore him a daughter in 1984. He moved into a home and lived with his wife and daughter at 1774 58th Street, not far from his restaurant and lounge which he still operated. In 1985 his marriage and Tali's Restaurant and Lounge began to suffer after DeBatt became addicted to cocaine and later crack cocaine. From the potent narcotic he fell into a paranoid schizoid state and did not want to go to work anymore. It is unknown if his wife knew about his addiction to cocaine and crack. He suffered from delusions that people were after him and he began to fear for his life and suffer from agoraphobia and hardly left his house at 1774 58th Street. At the trial of Sammy Gravano in 2003 his wife was too distraught to attend, along with her daughter.

=== Cocaine and crack addiction ===
Like his friend Nicholas Mormando, DeBatt became addicted to crack cocaine sometime during the Crack epidemic in 1984. He suffered from a paranoid psychosis brought on by the effects of the drugs. Gravano later surmised that his friend Nicholas Mormando got DeBatt addicted to the potent narcotic. He later became involved in murder and committing robberies to support his habit. He became estranged from his wife and children. Gravano later said, "He went crazy. He didn't come down for days. And when he does, he's sweating, he's all jumpy. His wife came to me (Gravano) crying, "I don't know what happened to him. He sits in the house behind a window with the blinds down, and he's got a rifle." She also stated that he told her, "If they come, I'm gonna battle it out." While Sammy Gravano and his crew did not approve of drug use, they did not have problems channeling the tasks of dealing to associates. It is unknown exactly who supplied Michael, or if it was Nicholas Mormando.

=== Career as a restaurateur ===
After his father died in 1981 he focused entirely on working on the restaurant business, taking over ownership management of his father's restaurant and working as the night-shift bartender. The restaurant would provide him with a legal means of income and keep him out of the public eye and being scrutinized by the Internal Revenue Service for his illicit gains as a criminal. Tali's eventually became the main criminal headquarters for rising Gambino crime family capo Sammy Gravano in the mid-1970s until DeBatt's murder. After his murder, his sister sold the family's business. While the restaurant served as a meeting place and headquarters for the crew of then-capo Sammy Gravano and his associates, no murders were performed on the premises. In 1985 Tali's Restaurant and Lounge began to suffer after DeBatt started using drugs. He began to suffer from delusions that people were after him and began to fear for his life, always keeping a gun on him. To support his habit he began pulling home invasions. While this was well known to Sammy Gravano and fellow criminal associates he was never arrested or convicted of burglary.

=== The slaying of Frank Fiala ===
Frank Fiala was a drug trafficker and a powerful and wealthy Gambino crime family associate. He is not to be mistaken as a relative of Gambino crime family capo James Failla. He wanted to rent out The Plaza Suite to throw himself a birthday party. Fiala started to act very strange and unstable. He took DeBatt and other Plaza Suite employees on rides on his private Lear jet. He was in the nightclub all the time, consuming cocaine in large quantities and handing out bags of cocaine to patrons of the club.

At one point in time, DeBatt confronted Fiala who at the time was armed with an Uzi submachine gun and told him calmly and politely that there were no firearms allowed inside the nightclub. Later to keep a close observation of Fiala, Gravano told DeBatt to keep a close eye on him. He told DeBatt to get closer to Fiala and told him that he wanted to continue working as a bouncer after Fiala purchased the Plaza Suite, and told him Gravano always underpaid him. Fiala later told DeBatt in confidence, "Fuck this Sammy. Fuck this punk. When I take over, I'm doing this, that." After Fiala waved an Uzi at Gravano, Sammy was so enraged that he wanted him murdered immediately on June 27, 1982. He instructed Edward Garafola to round up Joseph D'Angelo, Liborio (Louie) Milito, Joseph Paruta, Thomas (Huck) Carbonaro, Nicholas Mormando and himself and rendezvous at D'Angelo's bar, Doc's. Sammy stationed his fellow associates in locations outside The Plaza Suite ready to ambush Fiala. To not arouse suspicion from Fiala or anyone in his group of partiers, DeBatt stayed positioned at the front door of the club maintaining the ruse of being a bouncer. At a prearranged signal from DeBatt, Joseph D'Angelo and Louis Milito leaped out from where they sat in a parked car at the corner around from the club on 86th Street and shot him. As Louis and Joseph D'Angelo heard Sammy Gravano call out his name, they ran out of the alley shooting. After the shooting, pandemonium broke out on the street. Some people were trying to get off the street and back into the disco in fear of being shot. DeBatt stood by the door and acted like he was one of the panicking party goers yelling, "Get down! Get down! Somebody's shooting". He held the door shut so nobody could get in or out of the Plaza Suite.

When interviewed by homicide detectives DeBatt told them that he did not know who owned the Plaza Suite and had never seen or met the owners in person. Gravano congratulated DeBatt, his friend Nicholas Mormando and the others on a "beautiful piece of work." Since this was not a sanctioned murder by their boss Paul Castellano, it could not go down that Mormando could be eligible to become a "made man" in the Gambino crime family for his involvement. He was never indicted or convicted for being accessory to the murder of Frank Fiala. After the murder of Fiala, Castellano was angry. He had DeBatt, Mormando and the others stay up at his New Jersey farm to lie low. After hearing the news that Castellano might order their executions over the unsanctioned murder, when given the chance by Sammy to leave, DeBatt and the others all said, "Sammy, we'll load up. We're ready." This shows that Michael displayed extreme devotion in following Gravano even when his own life was threatened.

The murder of Fiala was never solved until Sammy Gravano became an informant and testified in court on the murder during the trial of John Gotti.

=== The murder of Nicholas Mormando ===
Sammy Gravano would later say about DeBatt's childhood friend and acquaintance, Nicholas Mormando:

He became like a renegade. He went berserk. He didn't want to be in the crew no more. He was going to start his own little gang. I couldn't take a chance on him running around. He knew too much. So I got permission from John (John Gotti) to kill him. We finally got Nicky to come by Tali's, and he went with Huck (Thomas Carbonaro) to pick up Old Man (Joseph Paruta), who was still alive then. Joe got in the backseat and shot Nicky twice in the back of the head". Sammy Gravano and his brother-in-law Eddie Garafola were trailing in a car behind them. While both cars were driving on West 9th Street, near Bay Parkway Mormando's corpse was thrown out of the car into a vacant lot. It was found the next day.

DeBatt continued to serve in the crew of Sammy Gravano after Mormando's murder. He continued to work with his friend's executioners until his own murder in 1987. It is thought that he was so far plagued by the effects of consuming copious amounts of cocaine and crack cocaine that he did not care.

=== Falling out with Gravano crew and murder ===
Regarding the pinnacle of DeBatt's drug addictions, Gravano stated:

I lost control of him. I tried to talk to him, but he's too far gone. He ain't listening. And he's done work (murder) with us and our family. He was a good man, Mike, until this. Not only did I like him, I went back with his father, who was originally with me. Remember, when the father died, I took the kid under my wing. I know the mother, the wife. These people came to my farm in Jersey. They came to my house. They came to my parties. This just tore my fucking insides out. Afterwards, I stayed with them, helped them. But there's nothing I can do about Mike. This was the life. I got John (Gotti)'s permission. Mike worked the bar at Tali's. I decided he would be killed in Tali's and to leave him there to make it seem to the cops that the murder was because of a robbery.

Gravano hoped that as a result, nobody would think the murder was related to the Gambino crime family or organized crime in general. After a Mafia family wedding, Michael had gone back to Tali's with Thomas Carbonaro and Eddie Garafola, expecting the wedding party to join them as usual. "But the only ones who went back there were four murderers", says his sister Rosanna. Thomas (Huck) Carbonaro shot Michael while he was stationed behind the bar counter at Tali's. On November 3, 1987, DeBatt was killed after he was shot several times in the head and neck. He left behind a wife and several children. Michael's lifeless body was found face up on the floor in front of the restaurant's juke box by the night shift manager who was coming in to work. His pockets were emptied, his jewellery removed and the cash register cleaned out. Police investigators stated that while DeBatt had no criminal record, he was reputed to have associated with members of the Gambino crime family. Sammy's brother-in-law Eddie Garafola and Louis Vallario were present when the murder was fulfilled. Gravano waited at The Brown Derby, in Brooklyn with John Gotti when Edward came in and advised them both that the murder of Michael DeBatt had been carried out.

His murder remained unsolved until Sammy Gravano agreed to become an informer and testify against John Gotti to avoid prosecution for numerous crimes. He was the thirteenth victim of nineteen that Gravano confessed to the authorities of having orchestrated their murder or personally carried it out. In 1982 Gravano's close friend and criminal associate Joseph (Stymie) D'Angelo, who helped DeBatt murder Frank Fiala would be murdered in the same restaurant. Before the murder of DeBatt, Gravano arranged to have Nicholas (Nicky Boy) Mormando murdered for the same reasons. He had become heavily addicted to crack cocaine among other things, and was a liability to become an informant like DeBatt. In fifteen years since the murder of Michael, no one has been formally charged with the murder. He is survived by a wife and daughter who was four years old at the time of his death.

== Wrongful death suit ==
In November 1998, a wrongful death suit was filed by the surviving relatives of Michael, Nicholas Mormando, and Joseph Colucci. According to court documents Sammy Gravano admitted to playing a direct or indirect role in their murders in the plea agreement that he made with the government when agreeing to become an informant. Along with Gravano, DeBatt's family and the others filed suits against the author of his autobiography Peter Maas, Maas' literary agency I.C.M., the publisher of the autobiography, HarperCollins, and 20th Century Fox that was allegedly preparing a film adaptation of the book. In the complaint it stated that the plaintiffs were seeking, ""monetary and punitive damages from all defendants for their intentional failure to comply with New York's Son of Sam Law ... and their deliberate scheme to circumvent same." Previously during the spring of 1997, the State Crime Victims Board and State Attorney General Dennis Vacco launched a similar lawsuit against Sammy Gravano and many of the same co-defendants during their criminal trial.

== Reputed haunted murder location ==
Tali's Restaurant and Lounge, later went under new management and became Danza's. The bullet pock marks left from the DeBatt and D'Angelo gangland slaying still remain in the restaurant's brick wall as of 2008. In the March 10, 2002 issue of The New York Post, it was reported that the current restaurant owners and staff have witnessed figures seated at tables or heading down to the restaurant's basement, but then the mysterious figures vanish. These are allegedly the ghosts of DeBatt and Joseph D'Angelo. They also report hearing voices and the sound of a chainsaw. They say they can smell foul odors and they had the feeling that they were being watched by someone. A cousin of the current restaurant owner, Angela Perrone stated, "The place is definitely haunted. There's a creepiness, as if someone's always watching you. It's a sinister energy."

Perrone called in Frances Bennett, a parapsychologist. She conducted interviews with all the staff, and set up infrared video cameras, tape recorders and an electro-magnetic field meter for four hours to observe these mysterious happenings. Bennett said her probe recorded voices of the dead, repeating the name "Mike" and saying, "I'll kill you." A man's face reflected in glass at the bar and another image seen at the entrance, an apparition of a man crouched down near the bar, and orbs of light said to be "a sign of individual spirits" moving around the restaurant along with tablecloths fluffing up and dropping back down on their own. Roseanne Massa has told reporters that she believes her brother may be haunting Danza's because Gravano spent less than five years in jail after confessing to orchestrating his gangland execution and eighteen others as part of a deal with federal prosecutors for testifying against Gambino crime family mob boss John Gotti.

== In popular culture ==
Michael DeBatt and the gangland slaying of DeBatt are mentioned briefly in the made for television HBO movie Gotti, but DeBatt is never actually seen in the film.

In the NBC miniseries Witness to the Mob Mickey DeBatt is portrayed by actor Vincent Pastore. In this movie they do not show his relationship with Nicholas Mormando.
