= Witness to the Mob =

1998 American television film

- Genre: Crime; Drama
- Written by: Stanley Weiser
- Directed by: Thaddeus O'Sullivan
- Starring: Nicholas Turturro; Tom Sizemore; Michael Imperioli; Vincent Pastore
- Theme music composer: Stephen Endelman; Sonny Kompanek
- Country of origin: United States
- Original language: English

Production
- Executive producers: Robert De Niro; Brad Epstein; Jane Rosenthal
- Producer: Caroline Baron
- Cinematography: Frank Prinzi
- Editor: David Ray
- Running time: 240 min
- Production companies: NBC Studios; Tribeca Productions

Original release
- Network: NBC
- Release: May 10 – May 11, 1998

Witness to the Mob is a television film which premiered on Sunday, May 10, and concluded on Monday, May 11, 1998.

== Plot ==
The film follows the rise of Sammy "The Bull" Gravano in the ranks of the Gambino crime family, one of the "Five Families" of the New York Cosa Nostra, culminating in his becoming underboss to John Gotti, his decision to betray Gotti by testifying in the fourth and final trial that saw him sentenced to life imprisonment and his life in the Witness Protection Program.

Starting as a Brooklyn-born enforcer, as Gravano advances through the ranks, mentored by Salvatore “Toddo” Aurello. He becomes a made member and soldier, earning a reputation for ruthlessness through contract killings, including the murders of close associates, his brother-in-law Nicholas Scibetta, and others as ordered. He navigates internal family politics under boss Paul Castellano while building alliances with the ambitious John Gotti and mob figures like Frank DeCicco, Angelo Ruggiero, and Louie Milito.

Dissatisfaction with Castellano’s leadership, disputes over drug dealing, and power struggles culminate in the December 1985 assassination of Castellano and his underboss/driver Thomas Bilotti outside Sparks Steak House in Manhattan. Gravano participates in the planning and serves as a backup shooter alongside Gotti. In the aftermath, Gotti seizes control of the family and Gravano is elevated to underboss. The film depicts their subsequent partnership, Gravano’s continued involvement in murders (including that of former friend Louie Milito), family business dealings, and the contrast between Gravano’s low-profile loyalty and Gotti’s flashy, media-courting style as the “Teflon Don”.

Arrested with Gotti and others in 1990, Gravano is confronted with FBI wiretap evidence from the Ravenite Social Club. On tape Gotti criticizes him, questions his loyalty, and seems ready to shift blame for murders onto him. Facing a lengthy prison sentence and feeling betrayed, Gravano breaks omertà and agrees to cooperate with prosecutors. He provides detailed testimony about the Castellano hit and numerous other crimes, becoming the highest-ranking Mafia member to turn government witness (at the time).

Gravano's evidence helps secure Gotti’s conviction on murder and racketeering charges in 1992, resulting in a life sentence without parole. Gravano receives a reduced sentence for his admitted role in 19 murders and enters the Witness Protection Program.

== Cast ==
- Nicholas Turturro as Sammy Gravano
- Tom Sizemore as John Gotti
- Debi Mazar as Deborah Gravano
- Abe Vigoda as Paul Castellano
- Philip Baker Hall as Salvatore "Toddo" Aurello
- Frank Vincent as Frank DeCicco
- Lenny Venito as Sal DiMaggio
- Johnny Williams as Angelo Ruggiero
- Frankie Valli as Frank LoCascio
- Michael Imperioli as Louie Milito
- Vincent Pastore as Michael DeBatt
- Peter McRobbie as George Pape (based on Gerard Pappa)
- Nicholas Kepros as Vincent "The Chin" (Vincent Gigante)
- Michael Ryan Segal as Nicky Cowboy (Nicholas Mormando)
- Tony Sirico as Tommy Gambino (Thomas Gambino)
- Richard Bright as Joseph Paruta
- Richard E. Council as Louie DiBono (Louis DiBono)
- Peter Appel as Eddie Garofal (Edward Garofalo)
- Gerard Cordero as Wiseguy #1
- Tony Kruk as Di Bernardo (Robert DiBernardo)
- Stephen Payne as Bosko Radonjich
- Leonardo Cimino as Neil Dellacroce
- Arthur Nascarella as Bruce Mouw
- Gaetano LoGiudice as Gotti Bodyguard
- Kirk Acevedo as Nicholas Scibetta
- Joseph Siravo as Gene Gotti
- Kathrine Narducci as Linda Milito
- Drena De Niro as The Girl in the Beauty Shop

== Production ==
With Robert De Niro as an executive producer, the film was based on court records, FBI transcripts and news reports (rather than on the 1997 book Underboss written by Peter Maas).

Vincent Pastore, Tony Sirico, and Frank Vincent had all previously appeared in the 1996 film Gotti, which covered the same events, each playing a different character than they did in this movie.

== Reception ==
Movie Mavericks said, "Witness to the Mob is an exercise in spotting the actors and actresses that would go on to appear in David Chase’s groundbreaking cable show, The Sopranos." They gave particular kudos to the lead actor, saying of him, "Nicholas Turturro is a joy to watch perform; he gives this mini-series his all; and he imbues Gravano with humanity and charm, which are at odds with the horrific crimes he committed." Slouching Towards Hollywood said, 'This is more of a Cliff’s Notes (sic) to the life of Gravano . . than a classic in its own right. It’s the “Sense and Sensibility” of mob movies.'
