= Paruta =

Paruta is a surname of Italian origin. Notable people with the surname include:

- Joseph Paruta, also known as "Old Man" and "Sammy Gravano's Personal Luca Brasi" (1929-1986), mobster in the Gambino crime family
- Paolo Paruta (1540–1598), Venetian historian and statesman
