= Nicholas Mormando =

American mobster

Nicholas Mormando, also known as "Nicky Cowboy" (October 28, 1944 Brooklyn, New York – January 7, 1986 Bensonhurst, Brooklyn), was a Gambino crime family mob associate who was involved in the murder of Frank Fiala and member of Sammy Gravano's Bensonhurst, Brooklyn crew.

== Biography ==
Nicholas Mormando was the son of Italian-American emigrants from Morimondo in Milan, Italy. Upon arriving to New York City their surname was changed to "Mormando". Unlike Sammy Gravano, Gerard Pappa, Ralph Ronga, James Emma and other notorious budding mobsters, Nicholas was born in Schenectady, New York. He was a close childhood friend of fellow Gambino crime family mob associate Michael DeBatt who was only two years older than himself.

He was considered a "key man" in Sammy Gravano's crew with Joseph (Stymie) D'Angelo, Liborio (Louie) Milito, Joseph Paruta, Thomas (Huck) Carbonero. Unlike crew members Joseph D'Angelo Sr., Liborio Milito, Joseph Paruta and Michael DeBatt, Gravano does not mention having a close relationship with him or Mormando's relatives. Sammy Gravano later said, "For one week he (himself) would be flush with cash, but two weeks later he would be broke.

He never saved any money. He shopped for clothes, picked up tabs at restaurants and nightclubs, handed out huge tips and dined on champagne and filet mignon at the Copacabana." Sammy later said of himself, Michael and his young aspiring mob associates, "Fucking kids, all dressed up like jerk-offs, running around, doing a little gambling, doing a little this and that "and then broke again and it's "macaroni and ricotta at home or spaghetti, past e olio, with the oil and garlic."

By 1984 he had become exiled from the Gambino crime family and "put on the shelf" being excluded from all criminal activities with the crime family.

== Shootout with the Gallos ==
He took an oath with the other Rampers, "... be together forever. Fuck the world. Fuck everybody, even the mob" and was said by Gravano to be full of "piss and vinegar." Later on, this would change but that was the attitude they held at that point in their lives. In the early 1960s, during the Profaci-Gallo civil war in the Colombo crime family he had an encounter with Gerard, Sammy Gravano, James Emma, Joe Vitale, Tommy Snake and Lenny the Mole including a bunch of other gang members. They were hanging around in a bar at 79th Street and Utrecht Avenue. In the bar were several Gallo loyalists. They were a lot older than the Rampers and had an outstanding argument with associate James Emma. They were heavily armed so Nicholas and the others loaded up with firearms and headed back to the bar. Sammy later recounted the brutal gun battle in his autobiography,

It was a long bar. They were at one end of the bar and we were at the other end. It seemed like one of them went for a gun. We went for guns. There were a ton of shots thrown back and forth. It was like a cowboy movie. Totally unbelievable. Glass breaking, women screaming, things falling on the floor. One of the Gallo guys got hit, like eleven times. He staggers out of the bar and falls in the street. And lived, believe it or not. Another guy in the bar, an innocent bystander got hit in the foot. He went on his own to a doctor and never said nothing. The Gallo guy at the hospital don't say nothing, either.

He was involved in burglaries of local commercial franchises, fencing stolen goods, armed robbery and car theft.

== Frank Fiala murder ==
Gravano stationed Nicholas in a car parked around the corner from the Plaza Suite. He had a shotgun. If anyone in the group that normally accompanied Fiala drew a gun, he was to start shooting. His friend Michael DeBatt was positioned by his usual post as bouncer by the front door of the night club. After Frank Faila was murdered and pandemonium erupted out front of The Plaza Suite, Sammy had a getaway car stationed up the street. Down at the corner Nicholas had his shotgun ready but Fiala's people were in total shock. They did nothing. After the shooting, Nicholas and the other trigger men assembled at Joseph (Stymie) D'Angelo's bar, Doc's. Gravano congratulated Mormando, his friend DeBatt and the others on a "beautiful piece of work." Since this was not a sanctioned murder by their boss Paul Castellano, it could not go down that Mormando could be eligible to become a "made man" in the Gambino crime family for his involvement.

He was never indicted or convicted for being accessory to the murder of Frank Fiala. After the murder of Faila, Castellano was angry. Gravano had Mormando, DeBatt and the others stay up at his New Jersey farm to lie low. After hearing the news that Castellano might order their executions over the unsanctioned murder, when given the chance by Sammy to leave, Mormando said, "Sammy, we'll load up. We're ready." He earned the nickname "Cowboy" because he was known to perform criminal acts on his own without knowledge of Sammy Gravano or the Gambino crime family which was against the regulations.

== A renegade ==
In retribution for being exiled due to his insubordination, Mormando started a crew of small-time armed robbers, truck hijackers, burglars and drug dealers of his own. It is unknown how successful his leadership skills were and if the gang actually formed. It is thought that Nicholas was planning to battle it out with Sammy Gravano and other members of the Gambino crime family that he felt had slighted him. It is thought that after the death of Mormando, the gang dissipated and fell apart without another leader to replace him. It is unknown if his childhood friend Michael DeBatt, who was also heavily addicted to drugs was being persuaded to join Mormando's team of criminals. This worried Sammy Gravano, Frank DeCicco, Carmine Fatico and Salvatore Aurello, whose criminal territory was starting to be threatened by Mormando.

== Drug addiction and falling out with Gravano ==
Nicholas Mormando had become hooked on crack cocaine and cocaine. Sammy Gravano suspected that Mormando also got his friend Michael DeBatt hooked on the potent narcotic. Sammy later said about Nicholas:

He became like a renegade. He went berserk. He didn't want to be in the crew no more. He was going to start his own little gang. I couldn't take a chance on him running around. He knew too much. So I got permission from John (John Gotti) to kill him. We finally got Nicky to come by Tali's, and he went with Huck (Thomas Carbonaro) to pick up Old Man (Joseph Paruta), who was still alive then. Joe got in the backseat and shot Nicky twice in the back of the head.

Sammy Gravano and his brother-in-law Edward Garofalo were trailing in a car behind them. While both cars were driving on West 9th Street, near Bay Parkway, Mormando's corpse was thrown out of the car into a vacant lot. It was found the next day.

The murder of Nicholas Mormando remained unsolved until Sammy Gravano gave testimony at John Gotti's racketeering trial.

== Personal toll on Michael DeBatt ==
It is unknown how Michael DeBatt dealt with the murder of his friend or if he attended Nicholas' funeral. Michael continued to serve in the crew of Sammy Gravano after Mormando's murder. It is also unknown if Michael associated his friend's killing with Gravano or thought of it as a drug transaction gone bad. Michael DeBatt was murdered in 1987 on the orders of Sammy Gravano. Unlike the time when he would order the murder of DeBatt, Sammy Gravano shows no remorse in ordering the execution of Mormando.

== Wrongful death suit ==
In November 1998, a wrongful death suit was filed by the surviving relatives of Nicholas, Michael DeBatt and Joseph Colucci. According to court documents Sammy Gravano admitted to playing a direct or indirect role in their murders in the plea agreement that he made with the government when agreeing to become a stool pigeon. Along with Gravano, Mormando's family and the others filed suits against the author of Gravano's autobiography, Peter Maas; Maas' literary agency I.C.M.; the publisher of the autobiography, HarperCollins; and 20th Century Fox that was allegedly preparing a film adaptation of the book. These complaints sought relief for the plaintiffs in the form of "monetary and punitive damages from all defendants for their intentional failure to comply with New York's Son of Sam Law ... and their deliberate scheme to circumvent same." Previously during the spring of 1997, the State Crime Victims Board and State Attorney General Dennis Vacco had launched a similar lawsuit against Sammy Gravano and many of the same co-defendants during their criminal trial.

== In popular culture ==
In the NBC miniseries Witness to the Mob, Mormando is portrayed by actor Michael Ryan Segal.
