= Joseph Paruta =

American mobster

Joseph Paruta, also known as "Old Man" (December 3, 1929 – October 1986), was a respected soldier in the Gambino crime family and considered a "key member" of Sammy Gravano's Bensonhurst, Brooklyn crew. He is the only known mobster who asked for a mercy killing after becoming terminally ill with lung cancer. The proposition was not agreed upon by John Gotti and Paruta died of cancer.

== Biography ==
Paruta was born in Bensonhurst on December 3, 1929 to first-generation emigrants from Geraci Sicula, Italy of a Palermo family from Sicily. He was the oldest of three children, who grew up in poverty. Paruta was originally an associate who served in the crew of Gambino crime family capo Salvatore Aurello. He served in the Gambino crime family under the tutelage of Carlo Gambino and later Paul Castellano.

Sammy Gravano later said, "Everybody called Joe the 'Old Man'. He was only about fifteen years older than me (Gravano was born on March 12, 1945) but he already had white hair and looked kind of decrepit. He was tough and loyal. Old Man Paruta would kill for me as quick as he would get me a cup of coffee. Over the years, there was nothing I couldn't ask of him." His capo Sammy Gravano would later say that "he was like my own personal Luca Brasi," in reference to the fictional enforcer and hitman of the Corleone family in The Godfather.

Following puberty he started noticeably suffering from premature aging which made him appear several decades older. He was a short man in stature with thin arms and legs with a thick torso. By middle age he started to lose his telltale white hair as the Werner's syndrome worsened. He had a hoarse voice and his skin started to thicken and suffer from cataracts. He suffered from smoker's cough that was brought on by his years of smoking cigarettes. He was married to an Italian-American woman named Dorothea, who he nicknamed "Dottie" and had several children. He was a family man who would regularly take his family out to dinner at Tali's restaurant every week and have a large dinner.

Frank DeCicco later told Gravano an amusing anecdote about a robbery that Paruta, himself and several other criminal associates had arranged to pull off. He stated,

It seems in his early days, Frank (DeCicco) was going on a robbery with some guys. And for this particular score, they needed a lockpicker. Someone told Frank that Paruta was just the person they were looking for. Frank was surprised. He said to Paruta, "Why haven't I heard this before about you?" Old Man Paruta just smiled in response and said there wasn't a better lock guy around than him. So they're in the place and Frankie nods at Paruta, who steps forward and what he does is, he kicks in the door. "See, what did I tell you?" Paruta said. Frank was stunned. He couldn't stop laughing. And if that ain't enough, Paruta holds out for his end of the loot. His reasoning is that they never would have got inside the place without his talents. So you know a guy like that is all right.

He had a mild mannered nature and never demonstrated anger towards his fellow associates. After the murder of Frank Fiala by Sammy Gravano, Edward Garofalo, Thomas Carbonaro, Michael DeBatt and Nicholas Mormando, they assembled at his saloon, Doc's.

Sammy Gravano said about Paruta,

I loved the old man, Joe Paruta. My feeling for him went way beyond any oath of Cosa Nostra. He was the only one during all the plotting for the Castellano hit-all the what if this, what if that--that I confided in, was able to walk with, talk with, relax with. In one second, he agreed to take down Paul and Tommy in that diner like I asked him to before we changed the plan. He never asked me any questions if I wanted him to do something. He would take any risk. After Stymie (Joseph D'Angelo) got shot, he practically never left my side. I think about him a lot, and I never know whether to laugh or cry.... To me, Joe never seemed to change. He always looked the same, old and decrepit, always chain-smoking.... The old man had his little gambling and shylock operations and he had a piece of Tali's. He was satisfied. He never asked for anything more.

== Premature aging ==
It is suspected that Joseph suffered from Werner syndrome, a rare autosomal recessive disorder that is characterized by the appearance of premature aging. By 1959, at the age of thirty Joseph had the telltale condition of the syndrome by having a "birdlike" facial appearance. This made him stand out among the mob associates in Gravano's crew and made him the target of teasing due to his elderly appearance. Other signs that Paruta displayed was cancer and heart disease. It is unknown if Paruta was ever diagnosed with having the condition.

== Cancer ==
After the DiB (Rober DiBernardo) hit, his smoker's cough got worse and worse. Sammy made arrangements through some doctors he knew and checked him into the Memorial Sloan-Kettering Cancer Center at 1275 York Avenue in Manhattan, New York for testing. The prognosis was that he had terminal lung cancer that had spread through the rest of his body.

The doctors gave him only a year left to live. The chief doctor later confided to Sammy Gravano that he had lied to Paruta's family and that he only had three months to live. Gravano felt that he had to honor his friend. Even after being diagnosed with terminal cancer he did not stop smoking even when staying at the cancer centre.

== Initiation into Gambino crime family ==
His dying wish was that he become initiated into the Gambino crime family and die a made man. Sammy sent word to John Gotti through his brother Gene for permission to fulfill his last wishes and make his dream of becoming a "made man" true. Gravano personally conducted the ceremony in his room at the cancer centre. When it came time for him to prick his finger for the blood to mix with the holy card, Sammy could hardly get a drop. He was now reduced to a living skeleton.

== The death of Joseph D'Angelo ==
By 1982, Paruta was starting to act depressed over the murder of his friend Joseph D'Angelo who had been shot to death over a bar room dispute with an associate of the Colombo crime family. Sammy Gravano became concerned of his friend's mental well being. He lost interest in gambling and stopped visiting the horse races at the Aqueduct racetrack in the afternoon like he always had done. He told Gravano when asked about his depression, "Stymie ain't here no more. I'll be with you at your side until the day I die."

== Loyalty to the Dellacroce faction and Gravano ==
On December 2, 1985 Aniello Dellacroce died. Sammy Gravano stated, "Even before this, we decided we had to split up and go underground. If there was a leak, somebody had to survive and keep playing. Frankie (Frank DeCicco) said him and me would move into Joe Watts' basement. Joe and his wife and kids would stay upstairs.

John (John Gotti) and Angie (Angelo Ruggiero) could do what they wanted. I told Debbie I had to leave for a while, maybe for weeks, maybe for months, years. Don't ask. I don't know how long. Nobody in my crew knows anything, except Old Man Paruta. We stayed in contact with John and Angie using certain phone numbers."

== Plot to murder Castellano and Bilotti ==
After the Roy DeMeo trial started, Thomas Bilotti was known to pick up Paul Castellano and drive him to a restaurant where they sat in a table near the back and discussed business before heading to court in Manhattan. Both Paul and Thomas did not know who Paruta was. Gravano and Watts planned to have Paruta walk into the restaurant and go right past them into the men's washroom. In there, someone would plant a ski mask. He would put the ski mask on and come out with two guns.

They would be sitting there eating and discussing their trial when Paruta would just run out shooting. The rest of them would be outside, inside, surrounding the vicinity of the restaurant supporting him with backup. Later Frank DeCicco reported that Paul Castellano had sent him a message to be at a meeting at Spark's Restaurant in Manhattan. It was here that the actual execution would later be orchestrated and carried out. Paruta would not be chosen as one of the shooters in this planning of the murder of Castellano and Bilotti.

== Standing up for Sammy Gravano ==
After a violent encounter with an outlaw biker in his Bensonhurst, Brooklyn bar, Joseph Paruta offered to help murder a biker who attacked Sammy and almost murdered him. After remaining a fugitive from the mob, the biker returned to Bensonhurst after a few years. Sammy Gravano said:

"He reaches out for Paruta's kids and asks that they sit down with their father. He knows their father is connected, but he doesn't know he's with me. He says he had this trouble with Sammy the Bull and he knows he's a marked man. He wants Paruta to talk for him, and Paruta says, 'Sure, you're good friends with my kids, I'll talk to this Sammy for you. Just take it easy. Go about your business. Stay low key and I'll reach out for Sammy.' Paruta's son obviously knew their father was bullshitting him. The kids know Paruta is with me and everything that means."

The murder contract was later called off and the outlaw biker's life was spared.

== Gangland slaying of Robert DiBernardo ==
On June 5, 1986, Robert DiBernardo was lured to the basement offices of Sammy Gravano's drywall company on Stillwell Avenue in Bensonhurst, Brooklyn. Acting as if it was just a regular business meeting, Gravano told Paruta to get DiBernardo a cup of coffee. Paruta got up, but instead of getting the coffee, Paruta took a .380 caliber semi-automatic pistol with a silencer from a cabinet behind DiBernardo and shot him in the back of the head.

== Gangland slaying of Nicholas Mormando ==
Nicholas Mormando became hooked on crack cocaine. Sammy later said about Nicholas:

He became like a renegade. He went berserk. He didn't want to be in the crew no more. He was going to start his own little gang. I couldn't take a chance on him running around. He knew too much. So I got permission from John (John Gotti) to kill him. We finally got Nicky to come by Tali's, and he went with Huck (Thomas Carbonaro) to pick up Old Man (Joseph Paruta), who was still alive then. Joe got in the backseat and shot Nicky twice in the back of the head. Me and Eddie (Edward Garofalo) were trailing in a car behind. We dumped the body in a vacant lot. It was found the next day.

The murder of Nicholas Mormando remained unsolved until Sammy Gravano agreed to become a cooperating witness and testify against John Gotti at his racketeering trial. By the time Gravano was implicated in the murder, Paruta had succumbed to terminal lung cancer.

== Mercy killing ==
In 1984, during one of Gravano's bedside visits to Paruta, he asked him to kill him. He told Sammy, "Kill me, Sammy. Kill me, please." He tried to get Gravano to understand that a swift bullet was the best gift a true friend could give him. He couldn't stand the pain any more. But like every murder of a made man (which Paruta was), even a mercy killing, he had to get permission.

He sent a message through Gene Gotti to John Gotti. He tried to prepare Gene and explain the situation as best as he could. Although Gravano never found out what Gene told John when they discussed Paruta, Gotti denied the mercy killing. He said that there was no way he would authorize a murder contract on a made man under the circumstances they were facing. Sammy brought Gotti's discussion to Paruta who did not accept the answer.

He begged Sammy and prevailed on him that the friendship between them was above everything and that the only way he could prove his friendship was by carrying out the murder. Sammy ordered his brother-in-law Edward Garofalo to get a gun with a silencer. Sammy gave Paruta one day's notice to have his family away from the house on the day he was to be murdered. Thomas Carbonaro would be stationed outside the house in a car ready for a swift getaway.

Edward and Gravano would go through a back door that would be left open by Paruta. The two of them would go up to the bedroom where Joseph was confined to having fallen very ill at this point. Edward would sit him in a comfortable position and then join Carbonaro in the car outside when Gravano would shoot him. Sammy later said,

It was all set. I was home waiting to be picked up by Huck and Eddie. My wife was there. The night before I had been real irritable. When Debbie mentioned this, I put her off. I said I had things on my mind. Now I stepped outside for a second, and when I came back, she said she had sad news. Eddie had just called. He said that Old Man Paruta suddenly took a turn for the worse. He was rushed to the hospital by ambulance, but died on the way. He was only fifty-nine. My man of loyalty, of heart and soul, a man of honor, were gone.

His friend and family underboss Frank DeCicco would later be murdered a year later. The deaths of D'Angelo, Paruta and Frank DeCicco would all play a heavy toll on Sammy Gravano. With DeCicco's murder, Gravano would no longer have any of his original close friends or crew left having all met their demise either by his hand or at hands of others. The deaths of his criminal associates would later play a factor in deciding to testify against the Gambino crime family and his former boss and friend John Gotti.

After Paruta died, he would help support his wife and children financially over the years. He was the only member of Gravano's crew not to meet their fate by being murdered.

He was the last member of Gravano's original Bensonhurst, Brooklyn crew that he had inherited from Salvatore Aurello after Frank DeCicco was murdered by a car bomb in 1986, two years earlier.

== Replaced by Louis Vallario ==
After Joseph died, Gambino crime family capo Louis Vallario said to Gravano, "I know what you're feeling. I can't fill Stymie's (Joseph D'Angelo)'s shoes, or Paruta's. I wouldn't even try. But I promise I'll be there for you."

== In popular culture ==
In the movie Witness to the Mob, Paruta is portrayed by actor Richard Bright.
