= Robert DiBernardo =

American mobster

- Robert DiBernardo
- Born: May 31, 1937; Hewlett, New York, U.S.
- Died: June 5, 1986 (aged 49); Bensonhurst, Brooklyn, New York City, New York, U.S.
- Other name: "DiB"
- Allegiance: Gambino crime family

Robert "DiB" DiBernardo (May 31, 1937 – June 5, 1986) was an American caporegime in the Gambino crime family, who was reputed to control much of the commercial pornography in the US. During the 1984 US presidential election, publicity about DiBernardo having rented business premises from the husband of Geraldine Ferraro embroiled her in damaging media innuendo about organized crime.

By some accounts, DiBernardo was the most dominant figure behind the US adult film industry in his era. He was a relatively capable businessman who did not have a reputation for involvement in violence, but his Mafia links deterred potential competitors and warded off other criminals. He became immensely influential in the US pornography business, and an associate of Reuben Sturman. Whether DiBernardo's relationship with Sturman and others was based on extortion or mutual advantage was never established. DiBernardo was seen as a phenomenal money maker, secretive, and a lone operator (unlike most Mafia members of his status, he did not retain a crew to back him up). All of these traits made him vulnerable to others within Gotti's organization.

DiBernardo, who had been the target of a federal investigation into child pornography, was murdered by members of Sammy Gravano’s crew, on orders from John Gotti, as punishment for subversive behavior. His body was never found.

== Biography ==
=== Rise ===
One of the relatively few thought to have become made in the Mafia without committing a murder, DiBernardo, at that time allegiant to the DeCavalcante crime family, bought the softcore pornography business Star Distributors in the late 1960s, and used it to sell hardcore pornography of all types and media to adult industry businesses around Times Square, long perceived as an insalubrious (if not outright dangerous) district where police did not enforce obscenity laws. To many, the proliferation of such businesses in the early 1970s made the area a symbol of the city's decline. By the mid-1970s, hardcore child pornography was being openly sold in New York and other US cities, sparking outraged calls for the banning of all pornography and drawing police attention to DiBernardo. These films were imported, usually from Denmark or the Netherlands, and were viewed in peep show booths.

DiBernardo became associated with the Gambino crime family through his acquaintanceship with fellow pornographer and Gambino capo Ettore Zappi. Zappi allegedly sponsored DiBernardo for membership in the Gambino family.

DiBernardo directly commissioned the production of much of the so-called Golden Age of Porn-era hardcore films made in New York; rivals were intimidated out of business or co-opted into his network. Independents (such as the San Francisco-based Mitchell brothers) who were immune to pressure due to their location or other reasons had their films pirated. In his relationship with the largest US porn seller, Reuben Sturman, it is unclear whether DiBernardo was extorting or collaborating. However, FBI bugs caught DiBernardo telling another pornography magnate, Michael Thevis, that "the family" was in charge of his businesses.

DiBernardo and his associate Theodore "Teddy" Rothstein – the co-owner of KED Productions Inc. with DiBernardo – were among 44 people indicted as a result of an undercover FBI investigation of all major publishers and distributors of adult films and magazines throughout the United States which began in 1977. DiBernardo became the prime target of the operation following the death of Michael "Mickey Z" Zaffarano, a Bonanno crime family capo who suffered a fatal heart attack as FBI agents served a warrant for his arrest at his Times Square adult movie theater on February 14, 1980. Bernardo and Rothstein were convicted in Miami of conspiracy, transporting obscene materials for the purpose of sale and distribution, and three counts of using a common carrier to transport obscene materials across state lines on June 12, 1981, and each sentenced to five years in prison. A federal judge then overturned the convictions of DiBernardo and Rothstein and ordered the indictments against them dismissed on grounds that FBI agent Patrick Livingston – who posed as a dealer of adult materials in Miami and purchased allegedly obscene films and videotapes from KED Productions – may have lied to a grand jury. Livingston was arrested for shoplifting in November 1981, and there was evidence he was experiencing psychiatric problems involving an inability to distinguish between his real and undercover identities.

Although ostensibly only ranking as soldier in the Gambino crime family, he reported and paid financial tribute directly to Paul Castellano. DiBernardo complained that he got little respect from Castellano, who despised the porn business, but that Castellano took a hefty percentage of the returns nonetheless. One of the first to support John Gotti's plot to kill Castellano and supplant him as boss, DiBernardo was rewarded with the status of captain, despite not heading a crew of his own.

=== National attention ===
New York police routinely surveilled DiBernardo as an organized crime figure, but he only became widely known after his name emerged in publicity surrounding the 1984 Democratic candidate for United States vice president. The Walter Mondale campaign drew attention shortly after choosing Geraldine Ferraro for the ticket when the personal finances of Ferraro and her husband, real estate developer John Zaccaro, were made an issue and it emerged DiBernardo rented his premises from Zaccaro's company. The issue removed early momentum the Mondale–Ferraro ticket had gained, and diverted the campaign. DiBernardo was not mentioned during the 1984 vice-presidential debate, though questions over Ferraro's separate tax filing, which were widely seen as carrying implications about her husband's business, put her on the defensive. The Mondale-Ferraro ticket, always a heavy underdog, lost the general election. In 1992, the now-deceased DiBernardo was brought-up with more effect to discredit Ferraro, seriously damaging her fortunes in a Senate primary that she had been front-runner for.

=== Murder and aftermath ===
Sammy Gravano said he was told by the only Mafia member allowed to see John Gotti in jail, his friend Angelo Ruggiero, that Gotti wanted DiBernardo killed for being subversive. In his memoir, Gravano said he was reluctant to obey the command, failing to understand how DiBernardo—without the soldiers that would be necessary for any power play—could or would be posing a threat to Gotti's leadership. Believing Ruggiero would not have dared fabricate the instructions, Gravano decided he had to obey the boss's order. On June 5, 1986, DiBernardo was lured to the basement offices of Gravano's drywall company on Stillwell Avenue in Bensonhurst, Brooklyn. Acting as if it were a regular business meeting, Gravano told Joseph Paruta to get DiBernardo a cup of coffee. Paruta, who "Gravano regarded as his Luca Brasi" got up, but instead of getting the coffee, took a .380 with a silencer from a cabinet behind DiBernardo and shot him in the back of the head. Without his closely guarded knowledge, DiBernardo's pornography business interests became less profitable, although Gravano would help himself to the deceased man's control of Teamsters Local 282, which dovetailed with Gravano's construction racket.

In the 1996 HBO made-for-TV movie Gotti, actor Frank Vincent portrays DiBernardo as "DB". In Witness to the Mob, actor Tony Kruck portrays him simply as "Di Bernardo". Jimmy Palumbo plays Robert DiBernardo in a season three episode of the television series The Deuce.

== Other references ==
- Goombatah: The Improbable Rise and Fall of John Gotti and His Gang by John Cummings and Ernest Volkman
- Mafia Dynasty: The Rise and Fall of the Gambino Crime Family by John H. Davis
- Boss of Bosses: The FBI and Paul Castellano by Joseph F. O'Brien and Andris Kurins
- Frontline interview of Bruce Taylor in June 2001
- Perlez, Jane (1984-04-10). "Woman in the News: Democrat, Peacemaker: Geraldine Anne Ferraro", The New York Times.
- Ferraro, Framing a Life, pp. 65–67.
- "Ferraro, Geraldine Anne, (1935 - )". Biographical Directory of the United States Congress. Retrieved on 2008-08-30
