= Nicholas Scibetta =

American mobster (d. 1978)

- Born: Bensonhurst, Brooklyn, New York, U.S.
- Died: 1978
- Cause of death: Homicide
- Other name: "Little Nicky"
- Occupation: Mobster
- Relatives: Sammy Gravano (brother-in-law)

Nicholas Scibetta (died 1978), also known as "Little Nicky", was a Sicilian American mobster who was the nephew of Joseph and John Zicarelli, the brother-in-law of mobster Sammy Gravano and uncle of Gerard Gravano, who was a Gambino crime family mob associate who was later marked as an informant by fellow crime family members.

== Early life ==
Scibetta was born and raised in Bensonhurst, Brooklyn, like his future brother-in-law Gravano. He was the only son born to first-generation immigrants, his father from Cammarata in the province of Agrigento, Sicily, and his Italian-American mother from Bayonne, New Jersey. His mother was a housewife and their father was "a terrific father, but very strict" man who was a certified electrical engineer who worked the night shift for Western Electric (now AT&T Technologies) putting together circuit boards for the telephone company.

Scibetta's sister Debra married Gravano in 1971.

== Falling out with the Gambino crime family and murder ==
In 1978, Castellano allegedly ordered the murder of Gambino associate Scibetta. A cocaine and alcohol user, Scibetta participated in several public fights and insulted the daughter of George DeCicco. Since Scibetta was Salvatore "Sammy the Bull" Gravano's brother-in-law, Castellano asked Frank DeCicco to first notify Gravano of the impending hit. When advised of Scibetta's fate, a furious Gravano said he would kill Castellano first. However, Gravano was eventually calmed by DeCicco and accepted Scibetta's death as the punishment earned by his behavior. Another part of the motive for the murder was that Scibetta was suspected of being gay. Gravano later said, "I chose against Nicky. I took an oath that Cosa Nostra came before everything."

Scibetta was dismembered and his body was never found other than an arm.

== In popular culture ==
In the made-for-television HBO movie Gotti, Scibetta is portrayed as "Nicky Scibetta" by actor Frank Crudele. In the film Witness to the Mob, Nicky is portrayed by actor Kirk Acevedo. He is allegedly a real-life inspiration for HBO prison drama series Oz characters father and son Nino Schibetta and Peter Schibetta.

== See also ==
- Lists of solved missing person cases
