= Gotti (1996 film) =

1996 biographical television film directed by Robert Harmon

- DVD cover
- Genre: Biographical; Crime drama
- Based on: Gotti: Rise and Fall by: Jerry Capeci; Gene Mustain
- Written by: Steve Shagan
- Directed by: Robert Harmon
- Starring: Armand Assante; William Forsythe; Anthony Quinn
- Music by: Mark Isham
- Country of origin: United States
- Original language: English

Production
- Executive producer: Gary Lucchesi
- Producer: David Coatsworth
- Production locations: Toronto, Ontario, Canada
- Cinematography: Alar Kivilo
- Editor: Zach Staenberg
- Running time: 116 minutes
- Production company: HBO Pictures

Original release
- Network: HBO
- Release: August 17, 1996

Gotti is a 1996 American crime drama television film directed by Robert Harmon and written by Steve Shagan. Based primarily on the columns of reporter Jerry Capeci, who also co-wrote the 1996 non-fiction book Gotti: Rise and Fall with Gene Mustain and served as the film's executive producer, the film stars Armand Assante in the title role as infamous Gambino crime family boss John Gotti, along with William Forsythe, and Anthony Quinn. It premiered on HBO on August 17, 1996.

Assante won the Primetime Emmy Award for Outstanding Lead Actor in a Miniseries or a Special for his performance. Assante received nominations for the Golden Globe Award for Best Actor in a Miniseries or Motion Picture Made for Television and the Screen Actors Guild Award for Outstanding Performance by a Male Actor in a Miniseries or Television Movie the same year.

== Plot ==
The film highlights John Gotti's association with three fellow mobsters: a father-son like relationship with Gambino underboss Aniello "Neil" Dellacroce, his deep but rocky friendship with Gotti crew member and longtime friend Angelo Ruggiero, and the respect and ultimate frustration that he felt for the man who became his underboss, Salvatore "Sammy the Bull" Gravano.

The film details Gotti's rise within the Gambino crime family, as an unofficial soldier (soldato) sent to prison following the murder of James McBratney in 1973, then being promoted to captain (or capo), and finally becoming boss of the family by arranging a hit on "Big" Paul Castellano in 1985. Following the murder of Castellano, the film concentrates on the legal trials of Gotti: one for assault and two for racketeering under the Racketeer Influenced and Corrupt Organizations (RICO) statutes.

Gotti's famous personality, trial acquittals, and media attention are all dramatized. The film ends with Gotti's conviction in 1992 and sentencing to life imprisonment at Marion Federal Penitentiary in Marion, Illinois when Gravano turns state's evidence and agrees to testify against Gotti in exchange for witness protection.

== Cast ==
- Armand Assante as John Gotti
- William Forsythe as Sammy Gravano
- Anthony Quinn as Aniello Dellacroce
- Vincent Pastore as Angelo Ruggiero
- Frank Vincent as Robert DiBernardo
- Richard C. Sarafian as Paul Castellano
- Dominic Chianese as Joe Armone
- Raymond Serra as Frank LoCascio
- Tony Sirico as Joe Dimiglia
- Al Waxman as Bruce Cutler
- Scott Cohen as Gene Gotti
- Robert Miranda as Frank DeCicco
- Marc Lawrence as Carlo Gambino
- Alberta Watson as Victoria Gotti
- Tony De Santis as John Favara
- Gil Filar as Frank Gotti
- Gerry Mendicino as Peter Gotti
- Yank Azman as Judge Nickerson
- Frank Crudele as Nicholas Scibetta
- Frank Pellegrino as Carmine Russo

== Production ==
Shooting took place in Toronto, Ontario, Canada. Armand Assante put on 35 pounds to play John Gotti.

== Reception ==
On review aggregator Rotten Tomatoes, the film holds a 60% rating based on five reviews, with an average rating of 5.20/10. Jeremy Girard of Variety called it "a fairly standard-issue gangster flick" that is problematic for its matter-of-fact presentation. Caryn James of The New York Times criticized its "docudrama syndrome", in which biographical dramas adhere closely to the historical record to prevent lawsuits despite the need for more characterization.

Howard Rosenberg of the Los Angeles Times called it "one of the better mob movies of the decade, and surely the best gangster portrait ever made primarily for television". TV Guide rated it 2/5 stars and described it as too detailed for casual viewers and too inaccurate for enthusiasts.

== Awards and nominations ==
Year	Award	Category	Nominee(s)	Result	Ref.
1997	American Cinema Editors Awards	Best Edited Two-Hour Movie for Non-Commercial Television	Zach Staenberg	Won	
1997	American Society of Cinematographers Awards	Outstanding Achievement in Cinematography in Movie of the Week or Pilot	Alar Kivilo	Nominated	
1997	Artios Awards	Outstanding Achievement in Movie of the Week Casting	Avy Kaufman	Nominated	
1997	Cairo International Film Festival	Golden Pyramid Award	Robert Harmon	Nominated	
1997	Directors Guild of America Awards	Outstanding Directorial Achievement in Dramatic Specials	Robert Harmon	Nominated	
1997	Golden Globe Awards	Best Miniseries or Motion Picture Made for Television		Nominated	
1997	Golden Globe Awards	Best Actor in a Miniseries or Motion Picture Made for Television	Armand Assante	Nominated	
1997	Golden Globe Awards	Best Supporting Actor in a Series, Miniseries or Motion Picture Made for Television	Anthony Quinn	Nominated	
1997	Golden Reel Awards	Best Sound Editing – Music – Television Movies of the Week, Pilots or Miniseries	Bill Abbott	Nominated	
1997	Online Film & Television Association Awards	Best Motion Picture Made for Television		Nominated	
1997	Online Film & Television Association Awards	Best Music in a Motion Picture or Miniseries	Mark Isham	Nominated	
1997	Online Film & Television Association Awards	Best New Theme Song in a Motion Picture or Miniseries	Mark Isham	Nominated	
1997	Online Film & Television Association Awards	Best New Titles Sequence in a Motion Picture or Miniseries		Nominated	
1997	Primetime Emmy Awards	Outstanding Made for Television Movie	Gary Lucchesi, David Coatsworth and Robert McMinn	Nominated	
1997	Primetime Emmy Awards	Outstanding Lead Actor in a Miniseries or a Special	Armand Assante	Won	
1997	Primetime Emmy Awards	Outstanding Directing for a Miniseries or a Special	Robert Harmon	Nominated	
1997	Primetime Emmy Awards	Outstanding Writing for a Miniseries or a Special	Steve Shagan	Nominated	
1997	Primetime Emmy Awards	Outstanding Cinematography for a Miniseries or a Special	Alar Kivilo	Nominated	
1997	Primetime Emmy Awards	Outstanding Editing for a Miniseries or a Special – Single Camera Production	Zach Staenberg	Nominated	
1997	Primetime Emmy Awards	Outstanding Sound Mixing for a Drama Miniseries or a Special	Robert W. Glass Jr., Ezra Dweck, Dan Wallin and David Lee	Nominated	
1997	Satellite Awards	Best Supporting Actor in a Series, Miniseries or Motion Picture Made for Television	Anthony Quinn	Nominated	
1997	Screen Actors Guild Awards	Outstanding Performance by a Male Actor in a Television Movie or Miniseries	Armand Assante	Nominated	

== See also ==
- Witness to the Mob
