= Smokin' Stogies =

2001 film by Vincent Di Rosa

- Directed by: Vincent Di Rosa
- Written by: Vincent Di Rosa
- Produced by: Eileen Garcia di Rosa
- Starring: Frank Vincent; Tony Sirico; Joseph Marino
- Cinematography: Norton Rodriguez; Ramon F. Suarez
- Edited by: Alex Mendoza
- Release date: 2001
- Country: United States
- Language: English

Smokin' Stogies is a 2001 American crime film directed by Vincent Di Rosa, and starring Frank Vincent, Tony Sirico, Joseph Marino.

== Premise ==
A gangster is sent to Miami to recover one million dollars in smuggled, and now stolen, Cuban cigars.

== Cast ==
- Joseph Marino as Vinnie Marscone
- Frank Vincent as Johnny Big
- Tony Sirico as Tony Batts
