= Frank Vincent =

American actor (1937–2017)

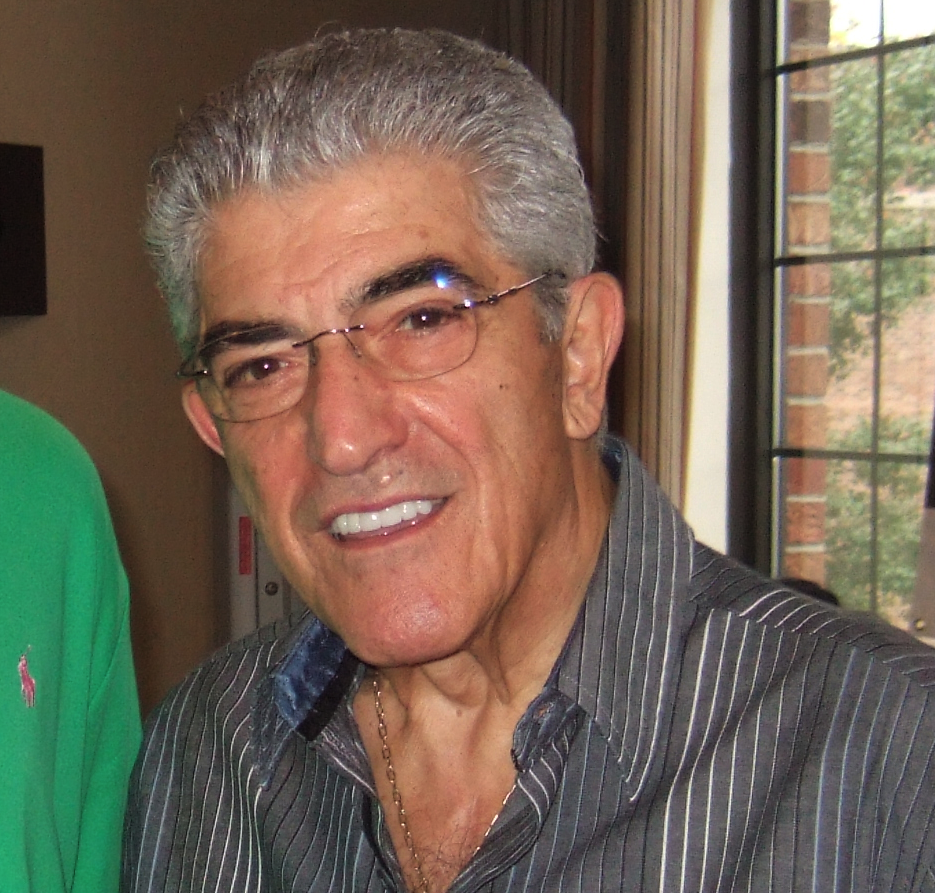
- Vincent in 2012
- Born: Frank Vincent Gattuso Jr. April 15, 1937; North Adams, Massachusetts, U.S.
- Died: September 13, 2017 (aged 80); Nutley, New Jersey, U.S.
- Occupation: Actor
- Years active: 1970–2017
- Spouse: Kathleen Vincent (m. 1970)
- Children: 3

Frank Vincent Gattuso Jr. (April 15, 1937 – September 13, 2017) was an American actor. Known for often portraying violent mobsters and criminals, he was a frequent collaborator of filmmaker Martin Scorsese, appearing as Salvy in Raging Bull (1980), Billy Batts in Goodfellas (1990), and Frank Marino in Casino (1995). On television, he played Phil Leotardo on the fifth and sixth seasons of the HBO crime drama The Sopranos (2004–2007). Vincent voiced Salvatore Leone in the Grand Theft Auto video game series from 2001 to 2005. Vincent also worked as an acting coach, providing assistance and guidance to co-stars who did not have formal acting training.

== Early life ==
Vincent, who was of Italian descent with roots in Sicily and Naples, was born in North Adams, Massachusetts, and raised in Jersey City, New Jersey. His father, Frank Vincent Gattuso Sr., was an iron worker and businessman. He had two brothers, Nick and Jimmy, and a half-sister, Fran.

== Career ==
Skilled at the drums, piano and trumpet, Vincent originally aspired to a career in music. By day he was a studio musician who worked with many recording artists such as Paul Anka and Del Shannon. Vincent had his own jazz band, billed "Frank Vincent and the Aristocats", that played in the evenings. In 1969, Vincent's band needed a piano player to secure bookings and Vincent ended up hiring Joe Pesci to play guitar. As the popularity of lounge music waned, Vincent and Pesci turned to stand-up comedy, performing as "Vincent and Pesci" from 1970 to 1976. Their act coupled Abbott and Costello-inspired double-act antics with Don Rickles-style insult comedy, which proved popular. During this time, the men developed a strong professional and personal friendship.

Vincent and Pesci later landed parts in the low-budget gangster film The Death Collector (1976), where they were spotted by Robert De Niro. De Niro told Martin Scorsese about both Vincent and Pesci. Scorsese was impressed by their performances and hired Vincent to appear in a supporting role in Raging Bull (1980), in which he once again appeared with Pesci and co-starred with De Niro. Vincent appeared in small roles in two Spike Lee films: Do the Right Thing (1989) and Jungle Fever (1991). In the latter, he played the abusive patriarch of an Italian-American family.

One of his notable appearances in foreign films was as a supporting character in Juan José Jusid's Made in Argentina (1987), in which he played Vito, a wealthy Manhattan businessman who befriends the film's protagonist, a substance-abuse counselor who treated Vito's son, played by Luis Brandoni.

Vincent was often cast as a gangster. For example, in Scorsese's film Goodfellas (1990), he played Billy Batts, a made man in the Gambino crime family, who is killed by Joe Pesci's character; he also played a role in Scorsese's film Casino (1995) as Frank Marino (based on real-life gangster Frank Cullotta), the sidekick of Pesci's character who ends up killing him.

In 1996, Vincent appeared in the music video for rap artist Nas' song "Street Dreams." In the television movie Gotti (1996), Vincent played Robert "D.B." DiBernardo, an associate of Mafia boss John Gotti's, whose life the film chronicled. Vincent appeared in a small role in the 1998 film Belly, starring Nas and DMX and directed by Hype Williams. Vincent also served as an acting coach on the film. In the HBO TV series The Sopranos, he had his most prominent role as Phil Leotardo, a ruthless New York City gangster who, as boss of the show's fictional Lupertazzi crime family, becomes the show's chief antagonist in the final season.

In 1999, Vincent won the Italian American Entertainer of the Year Award.

In 2003, Vincent appeared in the film Remedy. That same year, Vincent portrayed Danny Santini in the film This Thing of Ours, whose associate producer was Sonny Franzese, longtime mobster and underboss of the Colombo crime family, and whose director was Genovese crime family capo Danny Provenzano (grandnephew of Anthony Provenzano). Later that year, Vincent testified in court on the behalf of Provenzano at repeal sentences; Provenzano was serving a 10-year sentence for racketeering and other charges.

One of Vincent's lighter-hearted roles was in a British television commercial for Peugeot cars. In early 2005, he appeared on Irish television in a series of commercials for Irish bank Permanent TSB.

In video games, Vincent voiced the character of Mafia boss Salvatore Leone in the video game Grand Theft Auto III (2001). He later reprised the role in Grand Theft Auto: San Andreas (2004) and Grand Theft Auto: Liberty City Stories (2005).

In 2006 he released a book, A Guy's Guide to Being a Man's Man, to positive reviews. His idol was Dean Martin. He has also released a line of hand-rolled cigars which have his picture prominently displayed on the band.

He played Lieutenant Marino in the independent film The Tested (2008), directed by Russell Costanzo. The following year, he made a cameo appearance alongside fellow Sopranos actor Steve Schirripa in the Stargate Atlantis episode "Vegas" (2009). The following year, he starred in Chicago Overcoat (2009) as the main protagonist.

In 2013, he starred in the hit IDW Publishing comic series Killogy created by Life of Agony's Alan Robert as the character Sally Sno Cones alongside Marky Ramone of The Ramones. The series was nominated at the Ghastly Awards for Best Mini-Series and won multiple Horror Comic Awards from the Horror News Network. In 2014, the comics were adapted into 3D-animation for the Killogy animated series, in which the cast of the original comic series contributed their voices.

A resident of Nutley, New Jersey, Vincent used his drumming skills in an impromptu performance at a township holiday concert.

== Death ==
In early September 2017, Vincent suffered a heart attack. He underwent open-heart surgery in New Jersey on September 13; however, he died shortly thereafter, at the age of 80. Director John Gallagher, who worked with Vincent on Street Hunter and The Deli, noted that the actor lied about his age to avoid age discrimination, and therefore many sources listed his birth year as 1939.

Vincent's remains were cremated at a funeral home in Montclair, New Jersey, and a funeral service was held on September 16.

== Filmography ==
=== Film ===
Year	Title	Role	Notes
1976	The Death Collector	Bernie Feldshuh	
1980	Raging Bull	Salvy	
1982	Dear Mr. Wonderful	Louie	
1983	Baby It's You	Vinnie	
1983	Easy Money	Mobster Dressed In A Trenchcoat	Uncredited
1984	The Pope of Greenwich Village	1st Crew Chief	
1985	Stiffs	Mafia Thug	
1986	Wise Guys	Louie Fontucci	
1987	Made in Argentina	Vito	
1988	Lou, Pat, and Joe D	Pop Corelli	
1989	Do the Right Thing	Charlie	
1989	Last Exit to Brooklyn	Priest	
1989	The Afterlife of Grandpa	Vinny Valenti	Short film
1990	Goodfellas	Billy Batts	
1990	Street Hunter	Don Mario Romano	
1991	Mortal Thoughts	Dominic, Joyce's Father	
1991	Jungle Fever	Mike Tucci	
1991	Dead and Alive: The Race for Gus Farace	Joseph F. Zanni Jr.	Television film
1994	Men Lie	Uncle Frank	
1994	Federal Hill	Sal	
1994	Hand Gun	Earl	
1995	Ten Benny	Ray DiGlovanni Sr.	
1995	Casino	Frank Marino	
1995	Animal Room	Arcade Owner	
1996	On Seventh Avenue	Angelo Occipente	Television film
1996	She's the One	Ron	
1996	Gotti	Robert "D.B." DiBernardo	Television film
1996	Night Falls on Manhattan	Police Captain	
1996	West New York	Tom Colletti	
1997	Grind	Nick	
1997	Cop Land	PDA President Vince Lassaro	
1997	The North End	Dominic "Dom" Di Bella	
1997	The Deli	Tommy "Tomatoes"	
1997	The Good Life	Unknown	
1997	Made Men	Tommy "The Bull" Vitaglia	
1998	Witness to the Mob	Frankie DeCicco	Television film
1998	Undercurrent	Eddie Torelli	
1998	Belly	Roger	
1998	Vig	Pete	Television film
1999	NetForce	Johnny Stompato	Television film
1999	Entropy	Sal	
1999	Penance	Suicide Man	Short film
2000	Isn't She Great	Aristotle Onassis	
2000	Gun Shy	Carmine Minetti	
2000	If You Only Knew	Gino	
2000	Ropewalk	Unknown	
2000	The Crew	Marty	
2000	Under Hellgate Bridge	Sal "Big Sal"	
2001	Smokin' Stogies	Johnny "Big"	
2001	Snipes	Johnnie Marandino	
2002	Hamlet in the Hamptons	Michael	
2003	Rubout	Frank Santello	Television film
2003	A Tale of Two Pizzas	Frank Bianco	
2003	This Thing of Ours	Danny Santini	
2003	Remembering Mario	Joey "Big Ears"	
2004	Shark Tale	Great White #3	Voice
2004	Coalition	Alvaro	
2005	Remedy	Uncle Charles	
2005	Van Vorst Park	Carlo	
2006	Last Request	Father Brice	
2007	City Teacher	Unknown	
2009	Chicago Overcoat	Lou Marazano	
2010	Stiffs	Jimmy "The Limo King"	
2010	The Tested	Lieutenant Marino	
2011	Spy	Gaetano	
2018	The Killer's Kiss	Michael Gazzo	Posthumous release

=== Television ===
Year	Title	Role	Notes
1987	Leg Work	Detective	Episode: "Peaches"
1989	The Paradise Club	Walter MacHeath	Episode: "Unfrocked in Babylon"
1991–1999	Law & Order	John Franchetta / J.Z.	2 episodes
1992	Civil Wars	Matty DiNofrio	Episode: "Mob Psychology"
1993	The Young Indiana Jones Chronicles	Johnny Torrio	Episode: "Young Indiana Jones and the Mystery of the Blues"
1994	Walker, Texas Ranger	Paul Mancini	Episode: "The Prodigal Son"
1996	Swift Justice	Tony Accardo	Episode: "Stones"
1996–1997	New York Undercover	Bates / Ray Tarrafino	2 episodes
1997	Cosby	Dorothy's Husband	Episode: "Florida"
2000	NYPD Blue	Dino "The Rat" Ferrera	2 episodes
2004–2007	The Sopranos	Phil Leotardo	31 episodes
2008	Stargate Atlantis	Poker Player #1	Episode: "Vegas"
2014–2016	Mr. Pickles	Jon Gabagooli	2 episodes Voice
2016	Law & Order: Special Victims Unit	Bishop Cattalano	Episode: "Unholiest Alliance"
2017	Neo Yokio	Uncle Albert	Episode: "Hamptons Water Magic"; Voice

=== Video games ===
Year	Title	Role	Notes
2001	Grand Theft Auto III	Salvatore Leone	
2004	Grand Theft Auto: San Andreas	Salvatore Leone	
2005	Grand Theft Auto: Liberty City Stories	Salvatore Leone	
2021	Grand Theft Auto: The Trilogy – The Definitive Edition	Salvatore Leone	Archival recordings Remasters of Grand Theft Auto III and Grand Theft Auto: San Andreas only

== Bibliography ==
- Vincent, Frank; Priggé, Steven (2006). A Guy's Guide to Being a Man's Man. Berkley Books. ISBN 978-0425208762.
