= Boško Radonjić =

Serbian mobster (1943–2011)

- Бошко Радоњић
- Radonjić's 15 September 1978 NYPD mugshot
- Born: 17 May 1943; Užice, Serbia
- Died: 31 March 2011 (aged 67); Belgrade, Serbia

Boško Radonjić (Serbian Cyrillic: Бошко Радоњић, Serbian: Boško Radonjić; 17 May 1943 – 31 March 2011) was a Serbian mobster and former leader of the Westies, a predominantly Irish-American gang based in New York's Hell's Kitchen.

== Early life ==
Radonjić was born in 1943 in Užice. Boško's father, Dragomir, a teacher, was captured and executed during World War II by the Partisans for belonging to the Chetniks led by general Draža Mihailović.

In his late twenties, Radonjić fled the country and immigrated to the United States in 1970. He used his friendship with Red Star Belgrade footballer Milovan Đorić to sneak onto the team bus headed for Graz, which allowed him to get across the border.

== American years ==
Once in America, Radonjić settled in Hell's Kitchen area of Manhattan in New York City. He also joined the Serbian Homeland Liberation Movement (SOPO), an anti-communist and terrorist organization headed by Nikola Kavaja. Sharing royalist and anti-communist views, the two men became lifelong friends.

Already known to Yugoslav state security UDBA, Radonjić's activities began to be monitored even more closely by its agents. In 1975, Radonjić took part in a bombing at the Yugoslav mission to the United Nations in which no one was hurt. In 1978, he pleaded guilty to conspiracy charges in the 1975 bombing of a Yugoslavian consul's home and for plotting to bomb a Yugoslav social club, both in Chicago.

Upon his release in 1982, Radonjić moved back to New York's West Side and began working as a minor associate of Jimmy Coonan. He seized control of the gang following the imprisonment of many of the Westies leadership during the late 1980s. Under his leadership, he was able to reestablish the Westies' former working relationship with the Gambino crime family under John Gotti, and was involved in the jury tampering during Gotti's original 1986 trial for racketeering. One of the jurors, George Pape, did not disclose that he was a friend of Radonjić during jury selection. After he was empanelled, he let it be known that he was willing to sell his vote to help acquit Gotti. Gambino capo and future underboss Salvatore "Sammy the Bull" Gravano paid Pape $60,000 to guarantee at least a hung jury. Pape was convicted (United States v. Randonjich) in November 1992 of jury-tampering charges and sentenced to three years in prison. All charges against Radonjić were dismissed in May 2000.

== Back in Serbia ==
Since 1990, Radonjić had already spent a sizeable amount of time in Serbia, mostly dividing his time between Belgrade where he owned a night club named Lotos in Zmaj Jovina Street and Mount Zlatibor where he owned a casino named Palisade and where he also later built a casino named Club Boss.

=== 1999 arrest in Miami ===
Though based in the Balkans, Radonjić frequently travelled abroad, especially to Caribbean and South American destinations. During one such trip in late December 1999 after almost a decade spent in the former Yugoslavia, Radonjić was arrested by U.S. custom officials in Miami, Florida. He had been flagged by a customs agent who ran variations of his name and found a warrant from federal court in the New York borough of Brooklyn.

He had been indicted in 1992 for giving a $60,000 bribe to a juror in the 1987 racketeering murder trial of John Gotti, and thus was held without bail as a wanted fugitive. The charges against Radonjić were dropped after the key witness in his case, Gravano, was arrested for drug related offenses. Gravano had been the Gambinos' intermediary between Radonjić and the corrupt juror, Pape. However, the case against Radonjić was based almost entirely on Gravano's testimony, and Gravano's arrest made prosecutors believe his testimony would not be credible.

Radonjić was freed in March 2001. He immediately left the United States and went back to the former Yugoslavia. In subsequent interviews Radonjić claimed the FBI had ulterior motives for persecuting and harassing him:

In the late 1980s I found out through my sources that FBI along with the Justice Department is preparing to arrest and put on trial the boss of bosses John Gotti. Unfortunately for me, only three people in America at that moment were allowed to have this piece of information - the federal prosecutor, the FBI director, and the US Attorney General. In order to protect this classified information, FBI decided to arrest me, so I had to leave America and seek refuge in Yugoslavia. Because of this they issued an arrest warrant for me based on which they organized my kidnapping on 31 December 1999 in Miami.

During spring 2003, following the assassination of Serbian Prime Minister Zoran Đinđić, Radonjić was arrested and questioned as part of Operation Sablja, a wide-sweeping police action initiated by the Serbian authorities under the state of emergency. After spending three days in prison, Radonjić was released. He died following a brief illness in Belgrade, Serbia on 31 March 2011.

== In popular culture ==
- In the 1998 made-for-TV movie Witness to the Mob, a depiction of the life of Sammy the Bull, Radonjić is played by Stephen Payne.
- Niko Bellic, the main character of Grand Theft Auto IV, was possibly inspired by Radonjić due to both being Yugoslav criminals, with ties to Italian and Irish organized crime.
