= Dominick Cataldo =

American gangster

Dominic Cataldo
- Born: March 19, 1936; New York City, US
- Died: April 27, 1997 (aged 61)
- Allegiance: Colombo crime family
- Penalty: 35 years for federal racketeering (1985)

Dominic Cataldo (March 19, 1936 – April 27, 1997), known as "Little Dom", was a Sicilian-American soldier in the New York Colombo crime family.

== Biography ==
Dominic Cataldo was born in Lower East Side of Manhattan in a small apartment on Essex Street, his father, Samuel Cataldo, was a Sicilian immigrant from San Cataldo and member of the Profaci crime family. Dominic and his brother, Joseph, both joined the Colombo family. In 1972, Cataldo started an illegal bookmaking operation and casino out of an after-nights club located on 87th Street just across Atlantic Avenue, which was one block over and one block down from Salvatore Polisi's apartment on 95th Avenue and 88th Street. He lived a quiet life in Valley Stream, New York, which was home to many Mafioso in the 1960s, 1970s and 1980s. Dominic also had a restaurant on Rockaway Boulevard and 87th Street. His younger cousin Mario Bifulco was the cook. Dominic loved Mario because Mario was a maniac. Fighting all the time.

== The Gerard Pappa murder ==
On June 16, 1980, Genovese crime family soldier Gerard Pappa was shot to death in a Brooklyn luncheonette by a Colombo hit squad. This was an act of revenge for carrying out the murder of a suspected Colombo police informant Ralph Spero, the uncle of mobster Angelo Sepe. He was murdered by Cataldo and his nephews Nicholas and Joseph. Knowing how hard Pappa would be to kill, that he was always armed, and that he was very fast, they were hiding in the luncheonette's rear kitchen when he arrived. They approached him from behind and shot him in the head with a sawed-off shotgun. He was killed instantly. Sammy Gravano later spoke of feeling great sadness and remorse for the loss of his childhood friend. Genovese crime family mob boss Vincent Gigante was suspected of handing down the murder contract, but was acquitted of his alleged involvement in the murder in 1997.

=== Indictment and incarceration ===
The "books" for membership into La Cosa Nostra had been officially closed since the late 1950s. Following the death of Carlo Gambino in 1976, the last remaining mob boss to have decried such a rule, the books for proposed members were reopened. Cataldo received his membership into the Colombo family in the late 1970s.

In 1981, Cataldo was convicted of providing unlicensed 9-millimeter semiautomatic pistol and a silencer to an undercover federal agent.

On October 26, 1984, Cataldo was indicted on federal racketeering charges that included extortion, theft, loansharking, illegal gambling, bribery and drug trafficking.

Because of the testimony and evidence gathered by Ianuzzi and also by his supposed protege, Sal 'The Rat' Polisi, during Operation Homerun, Cataldo was convicted for a host of racketeering crimes or Racketeer Influenced and Corrupt Organizations Act predicate acts. In 1985, Cataldo was sentenced to 35 years in prison. On April 27, 1997, Cataldo died in prison of cancer, aged 61

== Sources ==
- Taylor, Nicholas, Sins of The Father The True Story of A Family Running From the Mob Backinprint (August 2002) ISBN 0-595-24067-4
- Schumacher, Michael, Dharma Lion : A critical biography of Allen GinsbergSt Martins Press (December 1994) ISBN 0-312-11263-7
- Ianuzzi, Joseph, Joe Dogs: The Life and Crimes of a Mobster Simon & Schuster (June 1993) ISBN 0-671-79752-2
- Dietche, M. Scott "The Beating of Joe Castellano" (1999)
- Albanese, S. Jay Contemporary Issues in Organized Crime
