= Louis Vallario =

American mobster (born 1942)

- Born: June 16, 1942 (age 84); Brooklyn, New York, U.S.
- Other names: Big Lou; Big Louie
- Occupation: Mobster
- Allegiance: Gambino crime family
- Convictions: Corruption (2001); Racketeering, murder, conspiracy, extortion, loan sharking, bribery, illegal gambling, and witness tampering (2004)
- Penalty: Three years' probation (2001); 13 years' imprisonment (2004)

Louis Vallario, also known as "Big Louie" and "Big Lou" (born June 16, 1942), is a member of the Gambino crime family who was a top aide to boss John Gotti and Salvatore "Sammy the Bull" Gravano in the late 1980s.

== Criminal history ==
Vallario was born in New York to first-generation immigrants from Piedmont, Italy. As a child, Vallario was friends with future Gambino mobster John Gotti. During the 1970s, Vallario joined the Aurello crew of the Gambino family in the Bensonhurst and Red Hook sections of Brooklyn. Vallario's illegal activities included loansharking, illegal gambling, bookmaking, and labor racketeering. Vallario was a close criminal associate of Frank Fappiano, Edward Garafola, Thomas Carbonaro, and Joseph D'Angelo. When Gravano later became a government witness, he refused to testify against Vallario.

In 1985, Gotti murdered boss Paul Castellano and took over the Gambino family. Gravano then became consigliere and Vallario took over Gravano's crew. Vallario reportedly became one of Gotti's top aides. In the late 1980s and early 1990s, Vallario became a prominent figure in the construction industry and enjoyed major influence over the New York City labor unions.

== Gotti's fall ==
In 1991, dozens of members of the family were indicted and sent to prison on Racketeer Influenced and Corrupt Organizations Act (RICO) charges, such as racketeering, extortion, loansharking, illegal gambling, conspiracy and murder for hire. Gravano eventually turned state's evidence, as Gotti and Consigliere Frank "Frankie Loc" LoCascio were sentenced to life imprisonment in 1992, the same time as Vallario was charged with racketeering.

In 1996, Vallario was promoted to the Gambino "Ruling Panel" with mobsters Steven "Stevie Coogan" Grammauta and Michael "Mikey Scars" DiLeonardo, John "Jackie Nose" D'Amico and Peter Gotti. John Gotti created the panel to assist his son John "Junior" Gotti, as acting boss. Vallario sat on the panel until 2002.

== Convictions and prison ==
In April 2001, Vallario was indicted in a corruption case against officials of Service Employees International Union (SEIU) Local 32B-32J. Prosecutors charged that corrupt members of this local enriched themselves through no-show jobs. Vallario pleaded guilty and was sentenced to three years probation.

In 2002, Vallario was indicted for murder, extortion, loansharking, bribery and illegal gambling. On April 23, 2004, Vallario pleaded guilty to the 1989 Weiss murder. A recycling executive and former city editor of the Staten Island Advance, Weiss was involved with the Gambino family in an illegal landfill scheme. Boss John Gotti ordered Vallario to kill Weiss because Gotti feared Weiss might become a government witness. Vallario shot Weiss to death outside Weiss's home on Staten Island. Vallario was sentenced to 13 years in federal prison.

As of December 2011, Vallario is incarcerated in the Fort Dix Federal Correctional Institution (FCI) in Fort Dix, New Jersey. On October 15, 2013, he was released from prison.
