= Underboss (book) =

1997 biography of Sammy Gravano

- Author: Peter Maas
- Language: English
- Subject: Sammy Gravano; American Mafia
- Genre: Crime; Biography
- Publisher: HarperCollins
- Publication date: 1997
- Publication place: United States
- Media type: Print (hardcover & paperback)
- Pages: 308 pp
- ISBN: 0-06-018256-3

Underboss is a 1997 biographical book based on the life of Sammy "The Bull" Gravano. The book goes through Gravano's early life up to 1997, which does not cover his re-arrest. The book's author is Peter Maas, who also wrote the book The Valachi Papers. Although Peter Maas is the credited author, Gravano was interviewed multiple times to describe what happened in his life. The book is published by HarperCollins Publishing Company.
