= Eddie Garafola =

American mobster (1938–2020)

Edward "Cousin Eddie" Garafola (March 25, 1938 – September 28, 2020) was a Gambino crime family captain who dominated the construction industry in New York City until the early 2000s. Garafola is believed to have been an American Mafia member since the mid-1970s.

== Biography ==
=== Personal life ===
Garafola was the brother-in-law of former underboss in the Gambino crime family Sammy "The Bull" Gravano, married to Gravano's sister Fran. He lived in Graniteville, Staten Island.

=== Criminal charges and activities ===
In May 1985, Garafola was charged with tax evasion for failing to report income from a New York discothèque that he owned with Gravano and a third Staten Island resident. Garafola and Gravano were also suspects in the 1982 murder of Frank Fiala outside of the same discothèque, although they were not convicted.

In September 1996, Peter Gotti visited his brother, Gambino boss John Gotti, in prison. John reportedly told Peter, then acting boss, to have Thomas "Huck" Carbonara and Garafola kill Gravano. Carbonara and Garafola reportedly made several trips to Arizona, where the media had revealed Gravano was hiding, to set up a hit. Gravano's arrest on drug charges in 2000 ended this venture. On May 22, 2003, Garafola was indicted in New York for plotting to murder Gravano.

In the late 1990s, Larry Ray was an informant for the FBI, and his job was to inform the Bureau about a scheme involving Garafola, but his efforts failed as he focused instead on using his role as an informant to conceal his own involvement in the scheme. In March 2000, both Garafola and Ray himself were indicted with others in Brooklyn, New York, for their roles in a federal racketeering and stock fraud scheme. The scheme involved the pumping and dumping of stocks by mobsters and stockbrokers, cheating investors out of $40 million between 1993 and 1996. As part of the fraud scheme Ray was charged with attempting to pay a $100,000 bribe to a bond brokerage firm executive on Garafola's behalf to ensure that a company would be granted a bond so that it could act as a general contractor on large construction projects. Slapped with a 43-count indictment and several RICO charges, Garafola was prepared to do life in prison. Garafola's son Mario, a reputed Gambino soldier and key player, was also charged and convicted in the plot. Edward copped a plea agreement to do life in prison in order reduce his son's sentence. As of April 2012, Mario Garafola had been released from FCC Allenwood. Said Gravano:

It's my brother-in-law Eddie. He's caused me nothing but trouble with his devious ways, always looking for the angle. He was a schemer, he always knew how to make money. A couple of guys in my crew wanted to whack him. You can’t trust him, they said. But he's got a big edge with me. His wife is my sister and I ain't ever going to hurt her.

=== Life sentence ===
Suspected of being involved in nearly two dozen murders dating back to the 1970s, Garafola pleaded guilty to the 2004 murder of his cousin, Edward "The Chink" Garofalo, although he claimed in court documents that he was not present the night of the shooting, and of plotting to kill his brother-in-law Salvatore (Sammy the Bull) Gravano. On September 6, 2007, Garafola was sentenced to 30 years in prison; he was 69 years old at the time.

In 2015, Garafola was denied compassionate release; at the time he was a partially paralyzed amputee who used a wheelchair and was unable to speak due to a stroke. A law enforcement source said Edward Garafola had not been "put on the shelf", or retired by the Gambinos, and he could theoretically give orders to mob associates if he came home.

He is not related to his namesake Eddie Garafola who was killed in 1990 in a hit orchestrated by Sammy Gravano.

Garafola died on September 28, 2020, and his remains were interred at Moravian Cemetery.
