= Gerard Pappa =

American mobster

Gerard Pappa, also known as "Gerry" and "Pappa Bear" (c. June 19, 1944, in Bensonhurst, Brooklyn – July 10, 1980, in Bensonhurst, Brooklyn), was a soldier in the Genovese crime family. Known as a hitman and a major narcotics dealer, Pappa was widely feared for his violent tendencies, which directly contributed to his own murder in 1980.

== Biography ==
Pappa was 36 when he was murdered by rival members of the Colombo crime family. He was known to the police and criminal associates as an ice-cold killer, although he was known as "Pappa Bear" to his wife and mistresses because of the "teddy bear" nature he displayed when in their presence, or simply "Pap" to his criminal associates. He was the son of first generation emigrants from Rocca di Papa, Italy in Bensonhurst where Sammy Gravano, Anthony Casso and Frank DeCicco were all born and raised. Pappa had straight jet-black hair, steady blue-grey eyes, and a severe high cheekboned, triangle-shaped face. His last name "Pappa" in Italian stands for "Pope" because documents dating from the twelfth century state his parents' village as Rocca di Papa which stands for Castrum Rocce de Papa ("Rock Castle of the Pope"), because Pope Eugene III lived in their village.

He was well known in the neighborhoods of Brooklyn and Staten Island. He had been a member of the notorious street gang called the Rampers, which included Thomas Spero, Joe Vitale, Ralph Spero, James Emma and future Gambino crime family underboss Sammy Gravano. Among the ranks of the street gang he was considered a "Ramper senior". As a rising hoodlum in organized crime circles he committed armed robbery, burglary, car theft and extortion. He was a fierce street fighter and described as one of the "baddest badasses" Brooklyn had ever produced along with his close childhood friend James Emma and Ralph Ronga. It is suspected that Pappa suffered from antisocial personality disorder and multiple personality disorder with violent mood swings. He served under the crime family associate Carmine Persico and Thomas DiBella before becoming a made man in the Genovese crime family.

His son John Pappa would also follow him into the life of crime, in the Colombo crime family.

== Shootout with the Gallos ==
In the early 1960s, during the Profaci-Gallo civil war in the Colombo crime family had an encounter with Pappa, Sammy Gravano, James 'Jimmy' Emma, Joe Vitale, Tommy Snake and Lenny the Mole including a bunch of other gang members. They were hanging around in a bar at 79th Street and New Utrecht Avenue in Bensonhurst, Brooklyn, along with several Gallo loyalists. They were a lot older than the Rampers and had an outstanding argument with member James Emma. They were heavily armed so Pappa and the others loaded up with firearms and headed back to the bar. Gravano later recounted the gun battle in his autobiography,

It was a long bar. They were at one end of the bar and we were at the other end. It seemed like one of them went for a gun. We went for guns. There were a ton of shots thrown back and forth. It was like a cowboy movie. Totally unbelievable. Glass breaking, women screaming, things falling on the floor. One of the Gallo guys got hit, like eleven times. He staggers out of the bar and falls in the street. And lived, believe it or not. Another guy in the bar, an innocent bystander got hit in the foot. He went on his own to a doctor and never said nothing. The Gallo guy at the hospital don't say nothing, either.

He was involved in burglaries of local commercial franchises, fencing stolen goods, armed robbery and car theft.

== Rescuing Gravano and "Joe Vitale" ==
While a member of the Rampers with Gravano and others, he rescued Gravano and fellow Ramper "Joe V. (otherwise known as Joe Vitale)'s life, who was nearly fatally shot in the abdomen during a bungled car theft in Bensonhurst. He bandaged up Joe V. who was bleeding profusely from a gunshot wound to the side and thought to be in critical condition. Sammy thought that he had been shot in the head. The two gang members had been shot by a distraught citizen who was attempting to pursue Pappa and the others for stealing his car. He drove Joe Vitale to Coney Island Hospital where he dropped himself out front of the emergency ward. Afterward, he drove Gravano to a doctor who practiced in Upstate New York who could be relied upon for discretion. According to Pappa's doctor associate, he discovered that the bullet instead of entering his brain, had grazed Gravano's temple, taking off a small shard of skull behind and slightly above his ear. In the hospital, due to Pappa's rescue efforts, Joe Vitale survived his nearly fatal gunshot wound.

== The breaking point for Pappa ==
Pappa was washing his car on a street in Bensonhurst when his close friend and fellow Ramper James Emma was gunned down by contract killers from the Colombo crime family sent on orders by Colombo crime family capo Dominick Scialo. The gunmen then turned their guns on Gerard. At that exact moment, a car was passing and Pappa dove in through an open window. The driver of the car was so overcome with fear that he did not notice Gerard in the backseat and sped off. The murder of James Emma was considered the breaking point for Gerard. He was taken down to the precinct as a witness to the shooting of Emma. Gravano was later shown papers revealing that his friend had filed paperwork for a protection order with the New York City Police Department. Sammy was outraged at his friend's act of perceived betrayal. Gravano stated, "Our relationship and friendship and everything died from that point on." He became the subject of many sitdowns between the Gambino crime family and Colombo crime family for his wanton acts of senseless violence that he displayed but was always given a "pass" and allowed to live because of his efficiency as a contract killer.

== Gangland slaying ==
In July 1980 Pappa was shotgunned to death in the Villa Sixty-Six Restaurant on Fourteenth Avenue and 66th Street in Brooklyn by a Genovese hit squad, revenge for Pappa murdering Colombo crime family caporegime Thomas "Shorty" Spero, the uncle of Angelo Sepe. He was murdered by Dominick Cataldo and his nephews Nicholas and Joseph Cataldo Jr., the sons of Colombo crime family mafioso Joseph Cataldo. They were hiding in the luncheonette's rear kitchen when he arrived. They approached him from behind and shot him in the head with a sawed-off shotgun. He was killed instantly. Genovese crime family boss Vincent Gigante was suspected of ordering Pappa's murder, but was acquitted of his alleged involvement in the murder in 1997.
