= Gotti (surname) =

- Pronunciation: Italian: [ˈɡɔtti]

Origin
- Origin: Italy

Gotti is an Italian surname.

== Geographical distribution ==
As of 2014, 57.2% of all known bearers of the surname Gotti were residents of Italy (frequency 1:9,415), 11.4% of France (1:51,278), 9.8% of India (1:692,297), 5.5% of the United States (1:574,326), 4.9% of Brazil (1:364,549), 2.6% of Argentina (1:160,690), 1.5% of Switzerland (1:48,306) and 1.3% of Tanzania (1:342,499).

In Italy, the frequency of the surname was higher than national average (1:9,415) in the following regions:

1. Lombardy (1:1,980)
2. Emilia-Romagna (1:5,881)
3. Friuli-Venezia Giulia (1:9,093)

== People with the surname ==
- Francesco Gotti (1923–1996), Italian rower
- Gene Gotti (born 1946), American mobster
- Giovanni Gotti (1912–1988), Italian racing cyclist
- Girolamo Maria Gotti (1834–1916), Italian cardinal of the Roman Catholic Church
- Giulio Cesare Gotti Porcinari (1888–1946), Italian general during World War II
- Irv Gotti (1970–2025), American record producer and record executive
- Ivan Gotti (born 1969), Italian professional cyclist
- John Gotti (1940–2002), American mobster and former boss of the Gambino crime family
- John A. Gotti (born 1964), American mobster and former boss of the Gambino crime family
- Kebo Gotti (born 1985), American rapper
- Laura Gotti (born 1991), Italian long-distance runner
- Luca Gotti (born 1967), Italian footballer
- Massimo Gotti (born 1986), Italian footballer
- Peter Gotti (1939–2021), American mobster and former boss of the Gambino crime family
- Renato Gotti (born 1964), former Italian long-distance runner
- Richard G. Gotti (born 1967), American mobster
- Richard V. Gotti (born 1942), American mobster
- Tito Gotti (1927–2024), Italian orchestra conductor, musicologist, and essayist
- Victoria Gotti (born 1962), American writer and reality television personality
- Vincenzo Ludovico Gotti (1664–1742), Italian cardinal and theologian of the Roman Catholic Church
- Vincenzo Gotti (c. 1580–1636), Italian painter of the Baroque period

== See also ==
- Gotti (disambiguation)
