= Richard Gotti =

Richard Gotti may refer to:

- Richard G. Gotti (born 1967), Mafioso, son of Richard V. Gotti
- Richard V. Gotti (born 1942), Mafioso, brother of John Gotti

== See also ==
- Gotti (surname)
