= Michael DiLeonardo =

American mobster (born 1955)

- Born: June 18, 1955 (age 71); New York City, New York, U.S.
- Other name: "Mikey Scars"
- Occupation: Mobster
- Relatives: Robert "Bucky" DiLeonardo (brother)
- Allegiance: Gambino crime family

Michael "Mikey Scars" DiLeonardo (born June 18, 1955) is an American former mobster who rose to the position of caporegime in the Gambino crime family. DiLeonardo turned government witness in 2002 and decided to cooperate with the FBI, who managed to convict over 80 mobsters using his testimony. DiLeonardo testified a record 15 times, more than any other made Mafia member to date.

== Background ==
Born in New York City, DiLeonardo grew up in Bensonhurst, Brooklyn. He lived there until 1998, when he moved to Eltingville, Staten Island. At age 10, DiLeonardo was scarred on the face by a dog attack, resulting in him being nicknamed "Mikey Scars". His parents were second-generation immigrants; his father's parents were immigrants from Bisacquino, Sicily. His mother was a seamstress and his father was a professional bowler. DiLeonardo had two brothers; Colombo crime family mobster Robert DiLeonardo (who was murdered on July 16, 1981) and James “Giovanni” DiLeonardo. DiLeonardo's grandfather, Vincenzo DiLeonardo, was a captain in the Brooklyn faction run by Salvatore D'Aquila, who was the boss of bosses at that time. As a young boy, DiLeonardo met Gambino boss Carlo Gambino several times at his grandfather's house. DiLeonardo started running with violent street gangs as a teenager.

In 1973, DiLeonardo graduated from New Utrecht High School in Brooklyn. He attended college for eighteen months, but did not graduate. In 1985, at age 29, DiLeonardo married Antoinette "Toni" Marie Fappiano, a cousin of Gambino underboss Frank DeCicco. DiLeonardo had one son with Fappiano, Michael DiLeonardo Jr. After twelve years of marriage, DiLeonardo started an affair with Madeline Fischetti. He kept Madeline in a rented apartment in Bay Ridge, Brooklyn while maintaining a home with his wife and son on Staten Island. DiLeonardo eventually divorced Antoinette and married Madelaine; they have a son, Anthony.

A wealthy man, DiLeonardo owned a mansion on Staten Island overlooking Raritan Bay.

== Mob life ==
By age 21, DiLeonardo had started working for the Gambino family. Since the 1960s, he had been running errands for tips from several Gambino associates. They would give him money for his pocket, he would do things like vandalize and assaults for them. DiLeonardo frequently visited the Veterans and Friends social club in Brooklyn run by boss Paul Castellano. However, DiLeonardo considered soldiers Paul Zaccaria and Jerry D'Aquila to be his mentors in the family.

In 1980, DiLeonardo opened a social club a block away from the Veterans' Club. In early 1981, he moved the club to a different location in Brooklyn. A successful venture, the club's customers included Gambino soldiers Salvatore "Sammy the Bull" Gravano and Frank DeCicco. DiLeonardo also used his club as a headquarters for his bookmaking, loansharking, and gambling operations. He then became partners in a produce market with Peter Castellano, cousin to Paul Castellano. During the mid 1980s, DiLeonardo became a close friend of John A. Gotti, commonly known as "Junior", who was the son of future boss John J. Gotti. Junior Gotti eventually named DiLeonardo as godfather for his second son.

On July 16, 1981, DiLeonardo's brother Robert was killed in a mob-related shooting. DiLeonardo wanted to kill the shooter, but Gambino boss Paul Castellano ordered him to stay out because it was related to internal Colombo business. In the 1980s, DiLeonardo maintained so-called legitimate jobs as a shop foreman for Teamsters Local 282. DiLeonardo soon opened his own construction company, Metropolitan Stone, with Eddie Garafola, Gravano's brother-in-law.

== The Gotti era ==
On December 16, 1985, Castellano was killed on orders from John J. Gotti, who became the family boss. With Frank DeCicco now becoming underboss, DiLeonardo had Lilo Garafola as his capo. Soon after, DiLeonardo was reporting to Gotti's Ravenite Social Club in Little Italy, Manhattan three to four times per week. After John A Gotti rose to power, DiLeonardo was with capo Jackie D'Amico after Lilo Garafalo died. In April 1986, DiLeonardo was at the Veterans and Friend Club then run by Frank DeCicco on the day Frank was killed by a car bomb. Gravano, Garafalo, and Joe DeCicco went over to try and pull Frank out of the car and help Frank Bellino who survived the blast.

On December 24, 1988, DiLeonardo and Junior Gotti were inducted into the Gambino family in a Manhattan ceremony conducted by Gravano, now consigliere. In 1989, DiLeonardo helped arrange the murder of publisher and sanitation business owner Fred Weiss. Boss John J. Gotti had ordered Weiss' death because he believed Weiss was planning to testify against Gambino soldier Angelo Paccione and Jimmy Brown Failla. Gunmen from the DeCavalcante crime family in New Jersey shot and killed Weiss outside his apartment building in Staten Island, New York.

During the mid-1990s, DiLeonardo supervised loan sharking and other illegal activities from the Royal Crown Bakery in Grasmere, Staten Island. DiLeonardo owned several tattoo parlors in Brooklyn, Queens and Staten Island. In addition, DiLeonardo claimed Staten Island mobster turned Miami club owner Chris Paciello as a Gambino mob associate. However, Colombo crime family capo "Wild Bill" Cutolo claimed Paciello as a Colombo associate. In 1996, DiLeonardo met with Colombo acting boss Alphonse "Allie Boy" Persico to settle the dispute. As a result, Paciello was allowed to choose which family to be associated with, and he chose the Colombos.

== DiLeonardo's rise and fall ==
In late 1992, boss John J. Gotti was convicted of murder and racketeering based on Gravano's testimony. In the shakeup that followed, DiLeonardo was promoted to captain. DiLeonardo's crew was given control of the family's construction and trucking rackets, and also control of the 18th ave crew. This included receiving monthly payments from Scara-Mix Concrete Company on Staten Island, which was owned by Philip; the son of Paul Castellano. DiLeonardo also moved his crew into Wall Street, using pump-and-dump stock scams to earn the Gambinos money. DiLeonardo became a close associate of Junior Gotti and assisted him when he was promoted to acting boss. On one occasion, a member of DiLeonardo's crew, Tommy Cherubino, hid some submachine guns for Gotti Jr.

In 1997, DiLeonardo and Garafola sold Metropolitan Stone because the City of New York had revoked Metropolitan's operating permit due to organized crime affiliations. By that time, he was also in control of captain Danny Marino's crew when Marino went to prison.

== Defection and government informant ==
In September 2000, DiLeonardo was indicted in Atlanta, Georgia, on racketeering, extortion and money laundering charges. He was specifically charged with extorting cash payments from Scores, a high-end strip club in Manhattan, and The Gold Club in Atlanta. On August 30, 2001, after a four-month trial, DiLeonardo was acquitted on all charges.

In late 2001, Peter Gotti was made boss of the Gambinos. In June 2002, DiLeonardo was indicted for labor racketeering, extortion, loan sharking, witness tampering, and the murder of Fred Weiss. While awaiting trial, the Gambino family administration stopped all money going to him. When DiLeonardo asked why this was happening, they said he was robbing the family. DiLeonardo claimed that he was not robbing anyone in the family, and that the accusation was untrue. DiLeonardo sent a message back saying "I don't remember dying or getting life in prison. I may come home one day." The Gambino family then shelved him. That was the turning point for DiLeonardo, and he testified how it was a betrayal on their part and how it crushed him. Finally, DiLeonardo decided to cooperate with the federal government. DiLeonardo later said that in 2002, the thought of having to testify against his friend Junior Gotti and others that were close to him led him to a suicide attempt. Other source say that his son's anger at him for becoming a government witness prompted the attempt.

He provided damaging testimony against Peter Gotti, Louis "Big Lou" Vallario, Frank Fappiano, Richard V. Gotti, Richard G. Gotti, and Michael Yanotti. DiLeonardo also testified at the four mistrials in which Junior Gotti was charged with ordering the 1992 abduction and assault of radio commentator Curtis Sliwa. Finally, in October 2006, DiLeonardo testified against former Colombo crime family acting boss Alphonse Persico, and underboss John "Jackie" DeRoss in their trial for the 1999 murder of former underboss William Cutolo. That case ended in a mistrial. In their second trial, they both would be convicted. DiLeonardo testified a record 15 times, more than any other "made" Mafia member to date.

On September 9, 2011, a judge sentenced DiLeonardo to time already served in prison – 36 months, and released him from confinement. He and his second family are now in the federal Witness Protection Program.
