= Jonathan Fernandez =

American writer and producer

Jonathan Fernandez is an American writer and producer. He wrote the film Rob The Mob starring Michael Pitt, Nina Arianda, Andy Garcia, Ray Romano, and directed by Raymond DeFellitta based on the true-life story of Thomas Uva and Rose Marie De Toma His first film, Crisis In The Kremlin, was written for producer Roger Corman. He has written for Star Trek: Enterprise. He was the executive producer of the Kurt Russell film Breakdown which opened at number one at the box office. Fernandez worked as Vice President of Production for Dino De Laurentiis and a production executive for Roger Corman. His book WINNING ESSAYS was published by Berkley/G.P. Putnam's Sons.

Fernandez is a member of the Writers Guild of America and was on the WGA Negotiating Committee in 2011, 2014, and 2018. He has a featured interview in the documentary Pencils Down: The 100 days of the Writers Guild Strike. In 2019, Fernandez joined other WGA members in firing his agents as part of the Guild's stand against the ATA and the practice of packaging, after the two sides were unable to come to an agreement on a new "Code of Conduct".
