= Dominick Pizzonia =

American mobster

Dominick "Skinny Dom" Pizzonia (born November 19, 1941) is a New York mobster and captain with the Gambino crime family who was a hitman and loanshark. Pizzonia allegedly participated in several high-profile murders.

== Early life and rise ==
Born in the Ozone Park section of Queens, Pizzonia began working for the Gambino family as a crew member for then caporegime John Gotti. He was called "Skinny Dom" to distinguish himself from Gambino mobster Dominick "Fat Dom" Borghese.

On December 16, 1985, Pizzonia participated in the assassinations of Gambino boss Paul Castellano and underboss Thomas Bilotti outside a Manhattan steakhouse. After Castellano's murder, Gotti took over as family boss.

In June 1988, Pizzonia allegedly murdered mobster Frank Boccia at the family's request. The Gambinos ordered Boccia's murder because he had punched his mother-in-law, the wife of imprisoned mobster Anthony Ruggiano. Pizzonia and Gambino associate Alfred Congiglio lured Boccia to a social club, killed him, took his body on a boat, and dumped the body into the ocean off New York City. Boccia's body was never recovered.

On December 24, 1988, as a reward for the Castellano and Boccia murders, the Gambinos allowed Pizzonia to become a made man, or full member, in the family.

In 1992, Pizzonia participated in the murder of Thomas Uva and his wife Rosemarie. Previously that year, the Uvas had robbed several social clubs belonging to the Gambino, Bonanno, and Colombo crime families. Pizzonia was especially enraged by the Uvas because they twice robbed Gotti's Bergin Hunt and Fish Club in Ozone Park, which Pizzonia managed. On December 24, 1992, Pizzonia and mobster Ronnie Trucchio located the Uvas. The couple was sitting in their car at a traffic light in Ozone Park when Pizzonia and Trucchio shot and killed both of them.

In 1995, Pizzonia became the head of a Gambino bookmaking operation and later replaced Peter Gotti as capo.

== Conviction ==
On September 22, 2005, Pizzonia and Trucchio were indicted in the 1988 Boccia murder and the 1992 Uva murders. In May 2007, a federal jury convicted Pizzonia on a racketeering charge of conspiracy to commit the Uva murders. He was acquitted on all three murder counts. Because Pizzonia had already pleaded guilty to an illegal gambling charge before the trial, the one single act of conspiracy was enough to convict him on the entire count. On September 5, 2007, Pizzonia was sentenced to 15 years in federal prison.

In November 2016, Pizzonia was serving his sentence at the Butner Federal Correctional Institution (FCI) in Butner, North Carolina. He was assigned federal inmate number 60254-053. Pizzonia was 78 years old when he was released on 15 November 2019. His scheduled release date had been 28 February 2020.

Dominick Pizzonia (Skinny Dom) was portrayed by Joseph R. Gannascoli in the 2014 crime drama Rob the Mob.
