= Carmine Agnello =

American mobster

- Born: 1960 (age 65–66); New York City, U.S.
- Other name: "The Bull"
- Spouses: Victoria Gotti (m. 1984; div. 2003) Danielle Vangar (m. 2009)
- Children: 4
- Relatives: John Gotti (father-in-law); John A. Gotti (brother-in-law)
- Status: Released on January 16, 2008
- Allegiance: Gambino crime family
- Convictions: Racketeering, tax evasion (2001); Environmental violations, theft, being a felon in possession of a firearm (2017)
- Penalty: Nine years' imprisonment, $950,000 in restitution (2001) $180,000 fine (2017)

Carmine "The Bull" Agnello (born 1960) is a New York mobster of the Gambino crime family who ran a scrap metal recycling operation.

== Criminal career ==
On February 5, 1994, Agnello was charged with criminal mischief for damaging a police scooter. The officer was ticketing cars parked outside of Agnello's scrapyard. Agnello came out to argue with the officer, then started his Ford Bronco and rammed the police vehicle, pushing it 15 feet (4.6 m) down the street. In June 1994, Agnello and several Gambino members brawled with police outside the same location, again over parking tickets, and Agnello was again arrested. On June 6, 1997, Agnello was arrested on assault charges for beating a former employee with a telephone. The victim later dropped the complaint.

On January 20, 2000, Agnello was charged with racketeering and arson. Undercover New York Police Department (NYPD) officers had set up a phony scrap metal business in Willets Point, Queens. Agnello then used firebombings and other illegal tactics to coerce them to sell their scrap to him at a below-market price. According to testimony, Agnello promised a cooperating witness $2000 to "buy glass bottles (and) fill them up (with gasoline) and throw them all around the truck" of a competitor. Defense documents claimed that Agnello was on medication for bipolar disorder, which led him to bad judgment. On August 16, 2001, Agnello accepted a plea bargain in return for a reduced sentence. On October 26, 2001, Agnello was sentenced to nine years in federal prison and ordered to forfeit $10 million in assets to the court. He was released from federal custody on January 16, 2008.

In July 2015, Agnello was arrested in Cleveland, Ohio on charges of theft, money laundering, and conspiracy, as well as drugging his own race horses with performance-enhancing drugs. He operated a $3 million stolen car and scrap metal scam at his scrapyard in Cleveland. In 2017, he accepted a plea deal that involved a large fine, but no prison time.

== Personal life ==
On February 18, 1980, Agnello was ambushed by several men, beaten with baseball bats, and shot. Contemporary newspaper reports described the attack after his tow truck was forced off the road in Queens. According to John Alite's 2007 testimony, the attack was retaliation ordered by John Gotti after Agnello allegedly assaulted Victoria Gotti. In 1984, Agnello married Victoria despite her parents' disapproval. The couple had three sons, Carmine, John, and Frank. The family lived in a mansion in Old Westbury, New York, that was the location in 2004 for the reality television series, Growing Up Gotti.

In 2003, while Agnello was in jail, Victoria Gotti divorced him on grounds of constructive abandonment.

On February 19, 2008, Agnello quietly married Danielle Vangar, the daughter of activist Mourad Topalian. Vangar met Agnello in prison when she was visiting her father. Agnello and Vangar have a son, who was born in 2009. Agnello and his second family lived in Cleveland, Ohio. He owned a business in Ohio that towed junk cars.
