= Rob the Mob =

- Theatrical release poster
- Directed by: Raymond De Felitta
- Written by: Jonathan Fernandez
- Produced by: William Teitler
- Starring: Michael Pitt; Nina Arianda; Ray Romano; Griffin Dunne; Michael Rispoli; Frank Whaley; Burt Young; Cathy Moriarty; Andy García
- Cinematography: Chris Norr
- Edited by: David Leonard
- Music by: Stephen Endelman
- Production company: The Exchange
- Distributed by: Millennium Entertainment
- Release dates: March 15, 2014 (Miami); March 21, 2014 (United States)
- Running time: 104 minutes
- Country: United States
- Language: English
- Box office: $209,613

Rob the Mob is a 2014 American romantic crime film directed by Raymond De Felitta, written by Jonathan Fernandez, and is based on a true story. The film stars Michael Pitt, Nina Arianda, Andy García, Ray Romano, Aida Turturro, Frank Whaley, Michael Rispoli, and Joseph R. Gannascoli. It was released on March 21, 2014.

== Plot ==
In 1991, small-time crooks Tommy Uva and Rosie DeToma rob a florist on Valentine's Day. He is thereby imprisoned for 18 months.

Meanwhile, Rosie works at a debt collection agency run by ex-con Dave Lovell. Reformed, he hires mainly other ex-cons. Lovell gives Tommy a job, but he is restless.

Tommy grows enraged when seeing mafiosos in Queens, as he blames them for his father's untimely death. His flower shop was started with a mafia loan, so he was frequently beaten for late payments. Tommy's mother and brother still run it, but she blames Tommy's criminal activity for his death.

Skipping work, Tommy attends John Gotti's trial. Watching Sammy the Bull's testimony, he learns guns are prohibited in mafia social clubs. Casing one, Tommy proposes robbing it to Rosie. He sees little risk as no one is armed, and they would never call the cops. He gets an Uzi, which Rosie teaches him to load.

During the first robbery, Tommy shoots the Uzi wildly, eventually getting the mafiosos' jewelry and cash. He humiliates them by disheveling their hair and making them hump each other. As he leaves, he shoots up the walls, declaring, "This is for Frankie Uva!"

Rosie and Tommy are thrilled with their score, but have dangerously angered mafiosos. Sal consults with big boss Big Al Fiorello about how to respond. He insists they scare, rather than kill them, as Gotti's trial is already drawing heat.

Low on money, Tommy and Rosie rob another club. Now he humiliates them by making them strip to their underwear. FBI surveillance is stunned to hear gunfire, then watch Tommy fleeing the mostly unclothed mobsters. Agent Frank Hurd photographs several of the bewildered men. Telling New York Post columnist Jerry Cardozo, he reluctantly releases one of them to publish. Suddenly a front-page story, it deeply humiliates the mob.

Tommy and Rosie convince Lovell to join them at the trial. He is as enthralled by Sammy's testimony as they are. Sammy mentions The Waikiki social club. On the way back to work, Lovell notices their Uzi hidden in the back seat.

When Tommy robs the Waikiki, he is dismayed there are only three very old men playing cards. Joey D begs for his wallet back, claiming it was from his dead wife. Tommy and Rosie discover a list of the entire mafia organization inside, with names, ranks, phone numbers, and addresses. They warn the mafia they have the list, as insurance against retribution. Rosie even calls Big Al at home to tell him about it.

Big Al is furious at Sal, who explains Joey D had the list believing no one would think such an old man had such an important piece of evidence. The list is a phone tree, meant to function as a pass by mobsters who get arrested. The FBI has always wanted such a document as it proves they are a real organization.

Big Al summons everyone to a meeting, putting out a contract on Tommy and Rosie, aka "Bonnie and Clyde". Meanwhile, Rosie calls Cardozo to complain that he has underreported how many clubs they robbed. She and Tommy get interviewed by Cardozo. His profile of them humiliates the mafia further, drawing far too much attention to Tommy and Rosie. Reading the article, Lovell warns them about the danger they are in.

One day, as Sal is driving through the neighborhood, he comes across Tommy and Rosie, recognizing their car. He follows them home, and is stunned they live three blocks from the first club robbed. Saul orders his underlings to kill them.

The FBI infiltrates Tommy and Rosie's apartment, making a copy of the list, which they use to arrest Big Al. Cardozo is outraged that the couple will not get any FBI protection for the role that they played in the investigation, so he buys them tickets to Mexico, as they are in way over their heads. They insist they have a plan. Driving into Manhattan to view the Rockefeller Center Christmas tree and the decorations on Fifth Avenue, they are finally gunned down by mafia captain Dominick Pizzonia.

A photo of Tommy and Rosemarie Uva is shown in the credits, and it is explained that the list led to several mob convictions.

== Cast ==
- Michael Pitt as Tommy Uva
- Nina Arianda as Rosie Uva
- Andy García as Big Al
- Ray Romano as Jerry Cardozo
- Aida Turturro as Anna
- Frank Whaley as Agent Frank Hurd
- Michael Rispoli as Sal
- Joseph R. Gannascoli as Dom
- Burt Young as Joseph Delmonico (also known as Joey D)
- Griffin Dunne as Dave Lovell
- Cathy Moriarty as Constance Uva
- Yul Vazquez as Vinny Gorgeous
- Aimee Mullins as Carrie
- Jeremy Allen White as Bobby
- Silvestre Rasuk as Homeless Man
- Brian Tarantina as Ronnie
- Luke Fava as Robbie
- Adam Trese as Assistant Director Ryan
- Garry Pastore as Sammy Gravano
- Samira Wiley as Agent Annie Bell
- Matthew Blumm as Marco
- Danielle Montezinos as Jumela
- Teddy Coluca as Joe Butch
- Bruce Altman as a Gotti Prosecutor

== Production ==
The filming began in May 2013 in Manhattan, New York City.

== Reception ==
On review aggregator website Rotten Tomatoes, the film has an approval rating of 83% based on 41 reviews, and an average rating of 6.99/10. The website's critical consensus reads, "Bolstered by a pair of likable leads and suffused in a warmly nostalgic glow, Rob the Mob is an uneven crime caper that mostly works." On Metacritic, the film has a weighted average score of 63 out of 100, based on 17 critics, indicating "generally favorable reviews".
