= Pizzonia =

Pizzonia is a surname. Notable people with the surname include:

- Antônio Pizzonia (born 1980), Brazilian racing driver
- Dominick Pizzonia (born 1941), American mobster
- Shaun Pizzonia (born 1968), American musician, DJ, sound engineer, and songwriter

== See also ==
- Pizzoni, municipality in Calabria
