= Gotti =

Gotti may refer to:

== People with the name ==
=== People with the surname ===
- Gotti (surname), a surname (including a list of people with the name)

=== People with the stagename ===
- Irv Gotti, stage name of Irving Domingo Lorenzo Jr., American DJ and record producer
- Juan Gotti, stage name of Juan Ramos, Mexican-American rapper
- Mwata "Gotti" Mitchell, member of the American hip-hop duo Boo & Gotti
- Yo Gotti, stage name of Mario Mims (born 1981), American rapper
- Young Gotti, stage name of Ricardo Emmanuel Brown (born 1972), American rapper, also known as Kurupt

== Arts, entertainment, and media ==
- Gotti (1996 film), a 1996 HBO television film directed by Robert Harmon
- Gotti (2018 film), starring John Travolta
- "Gotti" (song), a song by 6ix9ine
- Getting Gotti, a 1994 television film centered on a Brooklyn Assistant District Attorney Diane Giacalone
- Growing Up Gotti, an American reality television series that appeared on A&E
