= Gene Gotti =

American mobster

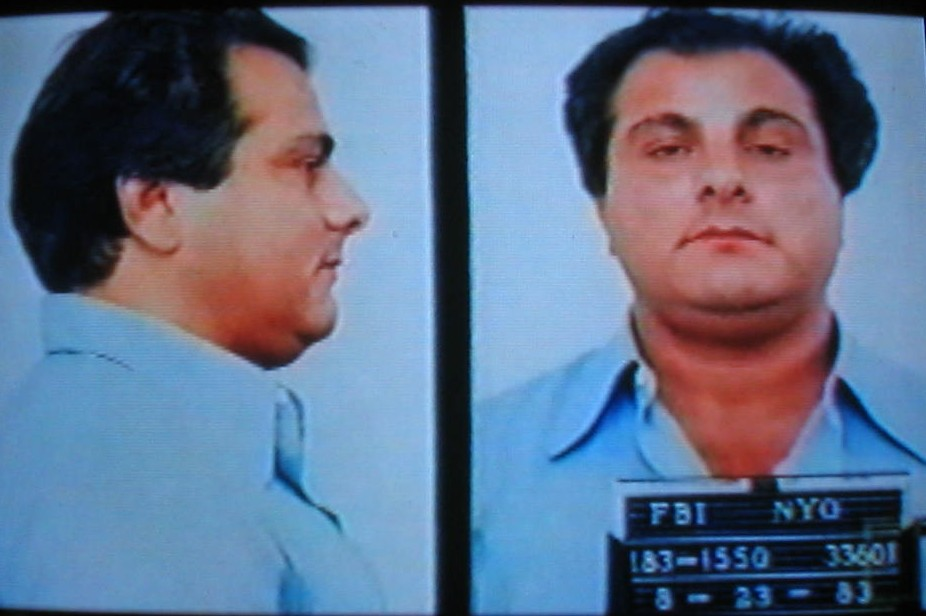
- Gotti's August 23, 1983 FBI mugshot
- Born: Eugene Gotti; 1946 (age 79–80); New York City, New York, U.S.
- Occupation: Mobster
- Spouse: Rosalie Gotti
- Children: 3
- Relatives: John Gotti (brother); Richard V. Gotti (brother); Peter Gotti (brother); Vincent Gotti (brother); John A. Gotti (nephew); Richard G. Gotti (nephew); Victoria Gotti (niece)
- Allegiance: Gambino crime family
- Convictions: Racketeering and drug trafficking (1989)
- Penalty: 50 years' imprisonment and fined $75,000

Eugene Gotti (born 1946) is an American mobster and a former captain in the Gambino crime family of New York City. He was sentenced to 50 years in prison in 1989 for racketeering and drug trafficking charges; he was released in 2018.

== Early life ==
Gotti was born in the Bronx, New York, in 1946. He was one of 13 children (two had died at birth) of John Joseph Gotti Sr. and Philomena "Fannie" DeCarlo. Gotti's brothers included John Gotti, Peter Gotti and Richard V. Gotti. All the brothers grew up in East New York, Brooklyn, and became involved with organized crime. John Cummings and Ernest Volkman in Goombata wrote, "He was noted for his inability to comprehend even the simplest statement addressed to him, and people dealing with him learned to speak slowly and repeatedly." He attended Franklin K. Lane High School with the other Gotti brothers. Gotti and his wife Rosalie have three children and eight grandchildren; his family home is in Valley Stream, New York.

Around 1966, Gotti became an associate with the Gambino family. In 1969, Gotti was convicted of theft from an interstate shipment and was sent to federal prison for three months. In 1973, Gotti was convicted in state court of illegal possession of a firearm and was sentenced to 18 months in state prison.

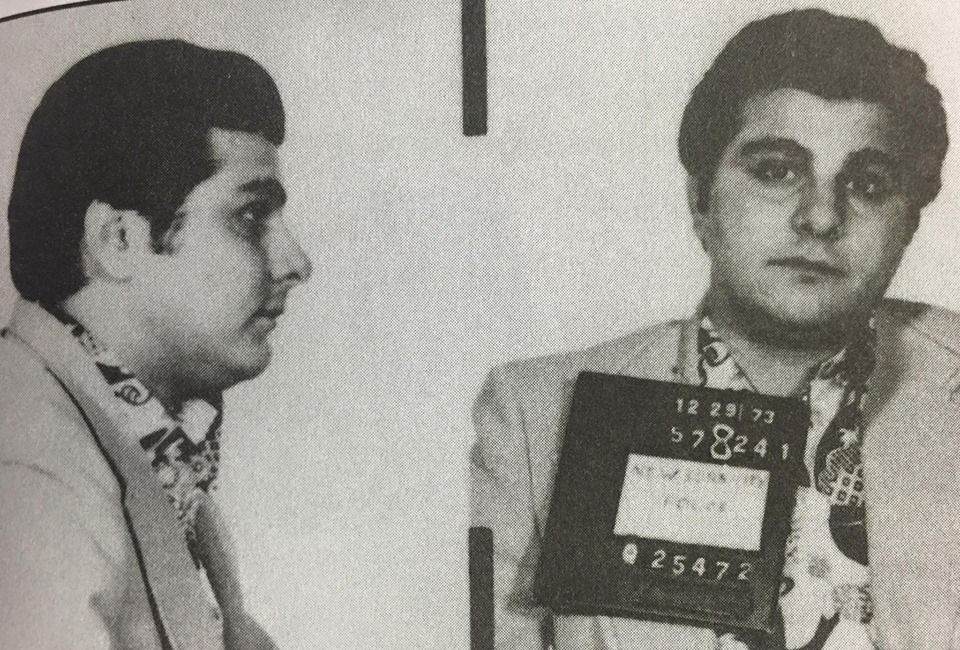
Gene Gotti December 1973 mugshot

== Criminal life ==
Gene became a made man in 1976, working with his brother, John, in his South Ozone Park crew.

Gotti carried out truck hijackings at Idlewild Airport (subsequently renamed John F. Kennedy International Airport) together with his brother John and friend Angelo Ruggiero. In August 1983, Ruggiero and Gotti were arrested for dealing heroin, based primarily on recordings from a bug in Ruggiero's house. Boss Paul Castellano, who had banned made men from his family from dealing drugs under threat of death, demanded transcripts of the tapes, and, when Ruggiero refused, threatened to demote his brother John.

In late 1986 Gotti took over the crew, when Ruggiero was demoted.

On March 13, 1987, Gene Gotti, his brother John and others, were acquitted on federal charges of loansharking, illegal gambling, murder, and armed hijackings.

== Prison and release ==
Later in 1987, Gotti and John Carneglia went to trial on the 1983 federal charges of narcotics trafficking, obstruction of justice, racketeering, and operating a continuing criminal narcotics enterprise. In January 1988, the judge declared a mistrial on this second case due to government charges of jury tampering. On July 27, 1988, in a retrial, the judge again declared a mistrial because jurors failed to reach a verdict. On May 23, 1989, in his third trial on the 1983 charges, Gotti and Carneglia were convicted of running a heroin distribution ring. On July 7, 1989, Gotti was sentenced to 50 years in prison and fined $75,000, the same penalty given to Carneglia. After his sentencing, the Gambino family demoted Gotti from capo to soldier because he was in prison. His elder brother Peter became new leader of the crew.

Gotti was imprisoned at the Federal Correctional Institution, Pollock, in Pollock, Louisiana, from 1989 to 2018. He was released on September 14, 2018, when he was 71 years old, after serving 29 years of his sentence.
