= Bergin Hunt and Fish Club =

Gambino crime family hangout in Queens

Coordinates: 40°41′06″N 73°50′35″W

The Bergin Hunt and Fish Club was the hangout of Gambino crime family member John Gotti in Queens, New York. The property had nothing to do with hunting and fishing. In practice, it was associated with hijacking trucks and loansharking.

Carmine Fatico purchased the club in the 1970s. It was two brick front stores, that were internally connected. It was located at 98-04 101st Avenue, in Ozone Park, Queens. Gotti conducted business and hosted community events at the club.

In 1992, Dominick Pizzonia participated in the murder of Thomas Uva and his wife Rosemarie, allegedly in retaliation for the couple twice robbing the Bergin Fish and Hunt Club.

The club was vacated by Gotti’s family by 2005.

In 2024, rapper J. Stalin released a collaborative album called The Bergin Hunt & Fish Club.

Curtis Sliwa has called the club the “Bergin Hunt, Fish, and Shoot Human Beings Club,” in reference to Gotti’s alleged role in the attempted assassination of Sliwa.
