= Carmine Fatico =

American mobster (1910–1991)

- Born: January 19, 1910; East New York, Brooklyn, New York, USA
- Died: August 1, 1991 (aged 81)
- Other name: Charley Wagons
- Status: Deceased
- Allegiance: Gambino crime family
- Criminal charges: Grand larceny, bookmaking, felonious assault, loansharking, conspiracy, theft
- Penalty: Theft (5 years)

Carmine "Charley Wagons" Fatico (January 19, 1910 — August 1, 1991) was a powerful caporegime in the New York Gambino crime family. Fatico is best known as an early mentor to Gambino boss John Gotti.

== Biography ==
Fatico was a short, slim man known more for his intelligence than his physical power. However, Fatico did not shrink from brutal violence when he deemed it necessary. Fatico quickly became a leading capo in the Gambino family due to his unfailing loyalty and obedience, and his tireless and innovative ability to earn money. Fatico's nickname "Charley Wagons" alluded to his penchant for hijacking transport trucks. Carmine Fatico had a brother, Daniel Fatico, who was his partner in all his rackets.

Fatico was an early member of the Mangano crime family, forerunner of the Gambino family. His arrest record dated back to the 1930s, and would eventually include grand larceny, bookmaking and felonious assault.

In 1951, mobster Albert Anastasia took control of the Mangano family and placed Fatico in charge of all family operations in East New York. Around 1952, 12-year-old John Gotti started running errands for the mobsters at Fatico's East New York club house. After Anastasia's murder in 1957, Carlo Gambino took over what was now the Gambino crime family and kept Fatico as the East New York capo. By 1966, Fatico commanded a crew of approximately 120 men, including made captains and soldiers and unmade mob associates.

In 1972, Fatico moved his crew from East New York to a new base of operations in Ozone Park, Queens. Fatico was allegedly unhappy about the changing ethnic composition of East New York, plus he wanted to be closer to Kennedy Airport, a major new source of family income. In Ozone Park, Fatico bought a social club and named it the Bergin Hunt and Fish Club. The name was a nod to Bergen Street in East New York, in the crew's old neighborhood. That same year, Fatico placed Gotti in charge of all illegal gambling operations in East New York. Fatico soon grew to admire Gotti's ability to force debtors to make payment.

Fatico conducted the hijacking of cargoes at John F. Kennedy Airport and on the Brooklyn waterfront. He dealt in stolen merchandise, loansharking, bookmaking, number-running, floating dice games, illegal casinos, sports book betting and the operation of push-button poker machines. It had been estimated that Fatico's crew grossed approximately $30 million a year.

On May 23, 1972, Fatico was indicted in Suffolk County, New York on loansharking and conspiracy charges. In 1973, Fatico was indicted again in Suffolk County on a new set of loansharking charges. As a condition for having bail, Fatico had to stay away from his crew. Fatico designated Gotti as acting capo, reporting directly to Gambino underboss Aniello Dellacroce.

In the mid-1970s, Fatico and several of his crew members were indicted on charges of stealing 98 mail bags containing $3 million in cash and securities that had come into the airport on an Air France flight. The charges also included the theft of fur coats. However, when the case went to trial in 1976, it ended in a mistrial. To avoid a retrial, Fatico pleaded guilty to one count of stealing the coats and was sentenced to five years in prison.

Gotti succeeded Fatico as capo of the Bergin crew in 1977, not long after becoming made.

On August 1, 1991, Fatico died of natural causes at age 81.
