= Nina Arianda =

American actress (born 1984)

- Ніна Матійцьо
- Arianda in 2026
- Born: Nina Arianda Matijcio; September 18, 1984 (age 42); Manhattan, New York, U.S.
- Education: New School (BA); New York University (MFA)
- Occupation: Actress
- Years active: 2009–present

Nina Arianda Matijcio (Note: Ukrainian: Ніна Аріанда Матійцьо, romanized: Nina Arianda Matiitso) (born September 18, 1984) is an American actress. She won the 2012 Tony Award for Best Actress in a Play for her performance as Vanda Jordan in Venus in Fur, and she was nominated for the 2011 Tony Award for Best Actress in a Play for portraying Billie Dawn in Born Yesterday. She starred in Amazon Studios legal series Goliath and starred in the biographical film Stan & Ollie (2018) as Stan Laurel's wife Ida.

== Early life and education ==
Nina Arianda Matijcio was born on September 18, 1984, in Manhattan, New York, to Lesia, a painter and teacher of English as a second language, and Peter Matijcio, a logistics expert for the Department of Defense. Her parents were born to Ukrainian refugees in Germany after World War II. She grew up in Clifton, New Jersey, and Heidelberg, Germany.

Arianda became interested in acting as a child, declaring at age 9 that she wanted to become a professional actress. She attended LaGuardia High School for one semester before her father’s job took her family to Heidelberg, where she finished high school. As a teen, she got involved with Roadside Theater, a community theater at U.S. Army Garrison Heidelberg.

She returned to New York for college in 2002, beginning her studies at American Musical and Dramatic Academy, earning a bachelor of arts at The New School, and a master of fine arts in acting at New York University's Tisch School of the Arts in 2009.

== Career ==
Arianda made her Broadway debut in April 2011 in the lead role of Billie Dawn in the Broadway production of Born Yesterday, with James Belushi and Robert Sean Leonard. She appeared Off-Broadway as Vanda Jourdain in the comedy-drama play Venus in Fur in 2010. The play then transferred to the Samuel J. Friedman Theatre on Broadway in early November 2011, and her performance received critical acclaim.

She starred in the Manhattan Theatre Club's production of Tales from Red Vienna in 2014. She has appeared in several films including Win Win, Tower Heist, Midnight in Paris, Rob the Mob, and The Disappearance of Eleanor Rigby. She was cast in January 2015 for Hannibal season 3 as Molly, the wife of Will Graham (played by her former Broadway co-star Hugh Dancy).

Arianda starred in Fool for Love at the Williamstown Theatre Festival in July 2014 with Sam Rockwell, directed by Daniel Aukin. Arianda and Rockwell reprised their roles on Broadway at the Samuel J. Friedman Theatre in 2015. Arianda played Agnes Stark in the film Florence Foster Jenkins (2016) and appeared in the film Stan & Ollie (2018) as Ida Kitaeva, the wife of comedian Stan Laurel.

Arianda co-starred in all four seasons of the series Goliath from 2016 to 2021, as well as in the fourth season of Billions.

In 2019, she appeared with Sam Rockwell in the Clint Eastwood film Richard Jewell.

== Acting credits ==
Key
†	Denotes productions that have not yet been released

=== Film ===
Year	Title	Role	Notes
2010	William Vincent	Lovely Woman #2	
2011	Win Win	Shelly	
2011	Higher Ground	Wendy Walker	
2011	Midnight in Paris	Carol Bates	
2011	Tower Heist	Miss Iovenko	
2013	Lucky Them	Dana	
2013	The Disappearance of Eleanor Rigby	Alexis	
2014	Rob the Mob	Rosie Uva	
2014	The Humbling	Sybil Van Buren	
2016	Florence Foster Jenkins	Agnes Stark	
2017	Never Here	Margeret Lockwood	
2018	Stan & Ollie	Ida Kitaeva Laurel	
2019	Richard Jewell	Nadya	
2021	Being the Ricardos	Vivian Vance	
2023	The Venture Bros.: Radiant Is the Blood of the Baboon Heart	Mantilla (voice)	
2024	Bang Bang	Jen	
2024	Greedy People	Deborah	
2026	You Can't Win	Mrs. Alexandra	Filmed in 2012.
2026	A Statement	Bernadette	
TBA	The Adventures of Drunky †	Fancy (voice)	In production

=== Television ===
Year	Title	Role	Notes
2011	The Good Wife	Gretchen Battista	Episode: "Get a Room"
2012	30 Rock	Zarina	Episode: "Stride of Pride"
2013	Hostages	Lauren	Episode: "Sister's Keeper"
2015	Hannibal	Molly Graham	Recurring cast: Season 3
2015	Master of None	Alice	Episode: "Hot Ticket"
2016	Horace and Pete	Maggie	Episode #1.4
2016	Crisis in Six Scenes	Lorna	Episode #1.5
2016–21	Goliath	Patty Solis-Papagian	Main cast
2019	Billions	Rebecca Cantu	Recurring cast: Season 4
2023	The Marvelous Mrs. Maisel	Hedy	Recurring cast: Season 5
2025	Étoile	Quinn McMillan	Recurring cast: Season 1

=== Theatre ===
Year	Title	Role	Notes
2010	Venus in Fur	Vanda Jourdain	Classic Stage Company, Off-Broadway
2011	Born Yesterday	Emma "Billie" Dawn	Cort Theatre, Broadway
2011–12	Venus in Fur	Vanda Jourdain	Samuel J. Friedman Theatre, Broadway; Lyceum Theatre, Broadway
2014	Tales from Red Vienna	Heléna Altman	Manhattan Theatre Club, Off-Broadway
2015	Fool for Love	May	Samuel J. Friedman Theatre, Broadway

== Awards and nominations ==
Year	Award	Work	Result
2010	Theatre World Award	Venus in Fur	Won
2010	Lucille Lortel Award for Outstanding Lead Actress in a Play	Venus in Fur	Won
2010	Outer Critics Circle Award for Outstanding Actress in a Play	Venus in Fur	Nominated
2010	Clarence Derwent Award for Most Promising Female	Venus in Fur	Won
2011	Drama Desk Award for Outstanding Actress in a Play	Born Yesterday	Nominated
2011	Drama League Award for Distinguished Performance	Born Yesterday	Nominated
2011	Outer Critics Circle Award for Outstanding Actress in a Play	Born Yesterday	Won
2011	Tony Award for Best Actress in a Play	Born Yesterday	Nominated
2012	Tony Award for Best Actress in a Play	Venus in Fur	Won
