= Michael Pitt =

American actor and model

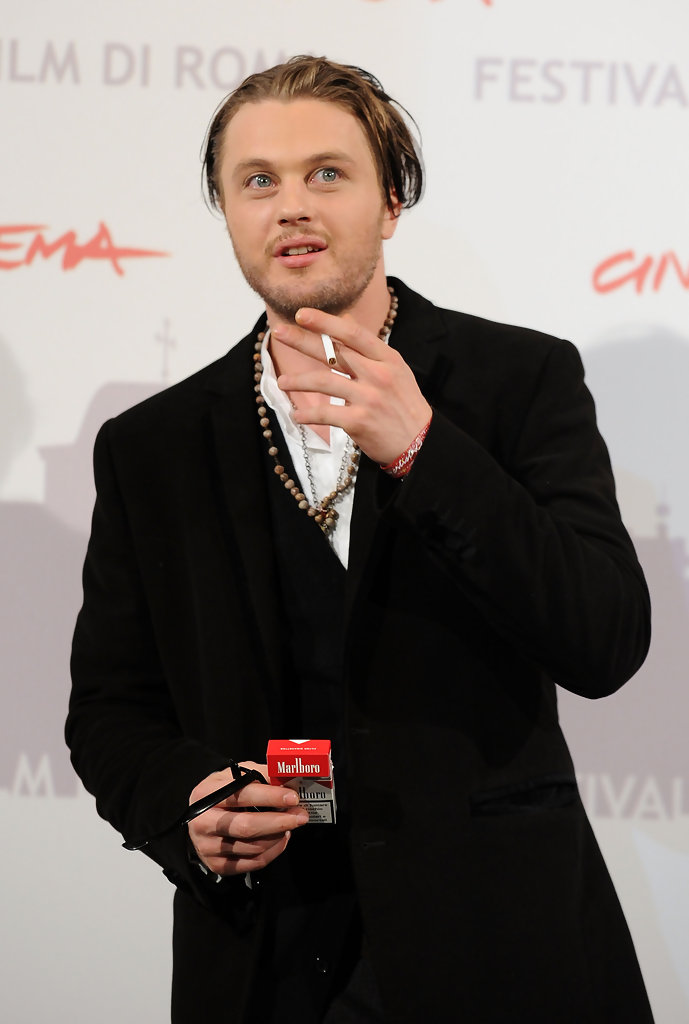
- Pitt in 2010
- Born: Michael Carmen Pitt; 1980 or 1981 (age 45–46); West Orange, New Jersey, U.S.
- Occupations: Actor; model
- Years active: 1997–present
- Partner(s): Asia Argento (2003–2004); Jamie Bochert (2004–2014)

Michael Carmen Pitt (born 1980 or 1981) is an American actor and model. In film, he has appeared in Hedwig and the Angry Inch (2001), Bully (2001), Murder by Numbers (2002), The Dreamers (2003), Last Days (2005), Silk (2007), Funny Games (2007), I Origins (2014), and Ghost in the Shell (2017). In television, he portrayed Henry Parker in the teen drama Dawson's Creek (1999–2000), Jimmy Darmody in the HBO series Boardwalk Empire (2010–2011), and Mason Verger in the second season of the NBC series Hannibal (2014).

== Early life ==
Michael Carmen Pitt was born in West Orange, New Jersey, the son of Donald B. Pitt, an auto mechanic, and Eleanor Carol (née DeMaio) Pitt, a waitress. He has two older sisters and one older brother. Pitt is of Italian and Irish heritage on his mother's side, and of English descent on his father's. By age 16, Pitt had been to three or four high schools, among them Morris Catholic High School, and was in "special classes" before ultimately dropping out. He also did a brief stint at the Essex County Youth House, a youth detention center.

== Career ==
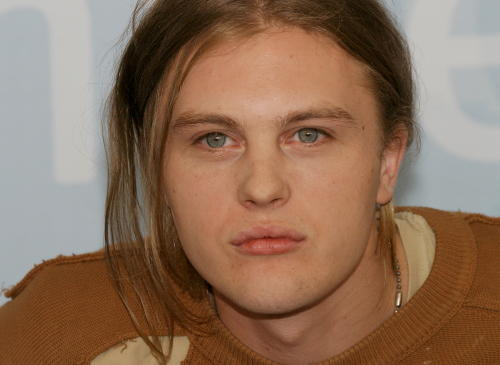
Pitt in 2003

=== Film ===
In 2001, Pitt portrayed Tommy Gnosis, the lover of a genderqueer rock star named Hedwig, in the film Hedwig and the Angry Inch, an adaptation of John Cameron Mitchell's 1998 stage musical. Although not his first film role, Pitt's performance as Gnosis led to a series of supporting roles in many acclaimed and often controversial films, including Bully (2001), Murder by Numbers (2002), and the 2007 remake of Funny Games. One of Pitt's more notable roles was as the lead in The Dreamers (2003).

Pitt attributes his success in films to a combination of hard work and the presence of "a few angels in my life." He has also stressed that he chooses roles not with the hope that they will garner commercial success or to gain notoriety but to create art, challenge the audience, and ultimately contribute to a project that he is proud of:

To be honest, I make very controversial films. The films that I've made have been very, very bold choices. As the years go by, I think my work is going to come more and more in context. The truth is that you can't take what people say too seriously. If I cared what people think about my career, I would have not done—just look at my work. Don't look at me, look at what I've done. Every movie that I've picked, from my first film on, has been considered by everyone to be "career suicide." And I have an amazing life. I have an amazing career. I work with artists. But I'm not making Spider-Man.

In 2004, Pitt has also appeared in The Heart Is Deceitful Above All Things and The Village and in 2005 starred in Last Days as a rock musician "inspired" by Nirvana frontman, Kurt Cobain. He performed all of the songs, which closely resembled Cobain's guitar and singing styles.

On the set of Last Days, he met Thurston Moore of Sonic Youth, who had been hired by Van Sant to serve as the film's music consultant. The pair formed a close bond, with Moore writing, "[Gus] wanted me to hang out with Michael and talk about his character, and let him be in character. We ended up spending a lot of time together. My daughter Coco still relates to Michael as Blake from Last Days".

In 2006, he starred in the unconventional romantic comedy Delirious as a young homeless man who befriends a celebrity photographer and falls in love with a pop singer. The movie appeared at the Sundance Film Festival. The following year, he played opposite Keira Knightley in Silk, adapted from the novel by Alessandro Baricco, as Hervé Joncour, a French silkworm smuggler, who falls in love with a baron's concubine while in Japan.

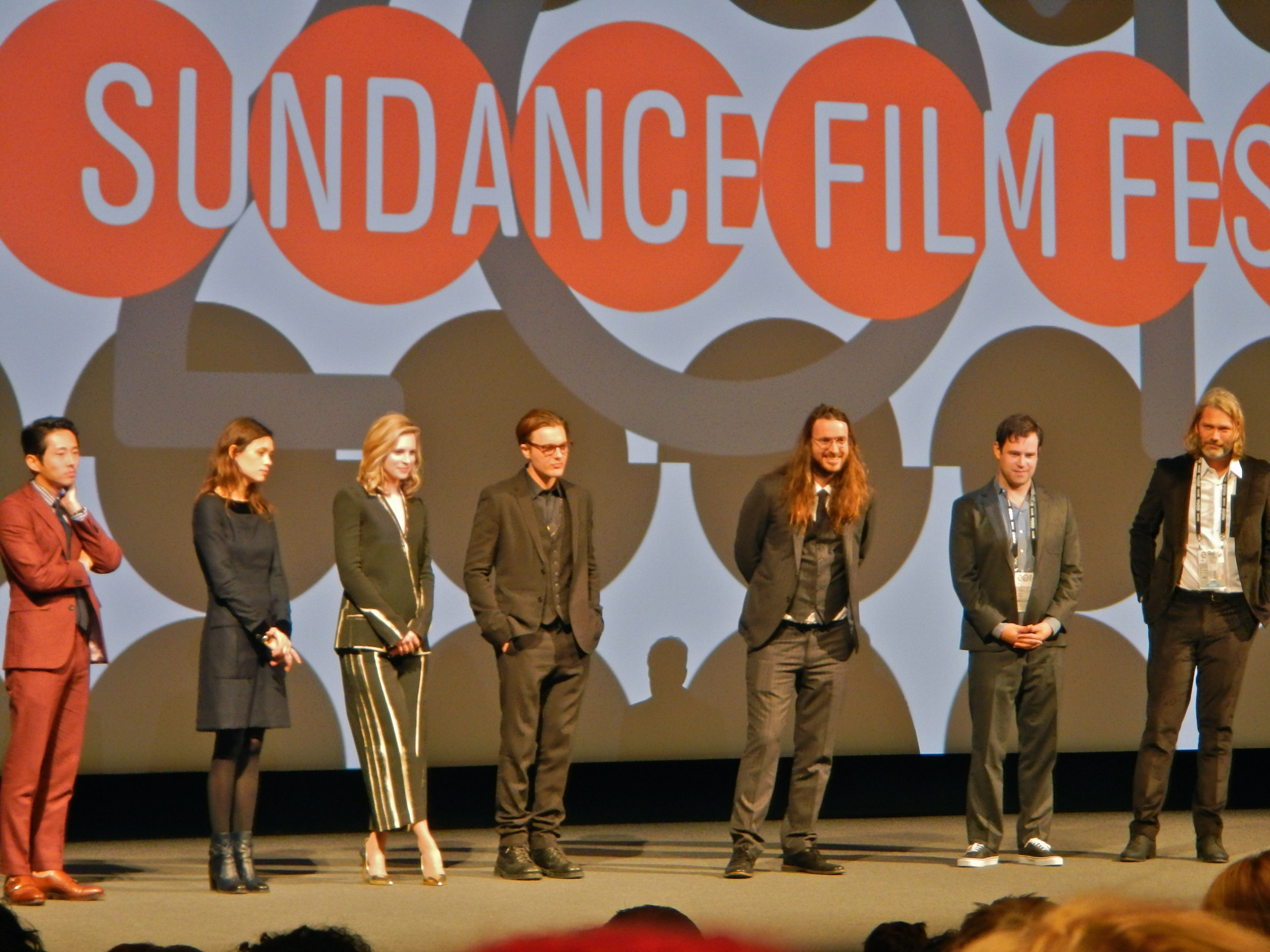
Pitt (center) at the 2014 Sundance Film Festival with the cast and crew of I Origins

In 2014, Pitt juggled two starring roles, as Tommy Uva in the comedic American crime drama Rob the Mob and as a molecular biologist in search of the truth about the origins of the eye in the science fiction romantic drama I Origins.

In 2017, Pitt starred in the film Ghost in the Shell as the villainous hacker Kuze, alongside Scarlett Johansson.

=== Theater ===
Pitt made his Off-Broadway debut in 1999 in the play The Trestle at Pope Lick Creek at the New York Theatre Workshop.

=== Television ===
During his theater debut, a casting agent whom Pitt had mistaken for a police officer attempting to arrest him noticed him and recommended him for a role on the television series Dawson's Creek. He played Henry Parker on a recurring basis in the third season (1999–2000).

In 2010, Michael Pitt was cast as Jimmy Darmody in the HBO series Boardwalk Empire (about the rise of Atlantic City during the Prohibition era), as the gangster protégé of corrupt politician Nucky Thompson. He appeared in the show's first two seasons and was nominated for a Screen Actors Guild Award and a Critics's Choice Award for his performance. Pitt said of Boardwalk Empire, "I'm proud of the work we did on that show. My grandfather was an Italian-American and he met my grandmother in Atlantic City. So Jimmy Darmody spoke to me; he felt very close to home."

In 2014, he was cast in the recurring role of Mason Verger in the NBC series Hannibal playing the role in the show's second season. He subsequently left and was replaced by Joe Anderson.

=== Music ===
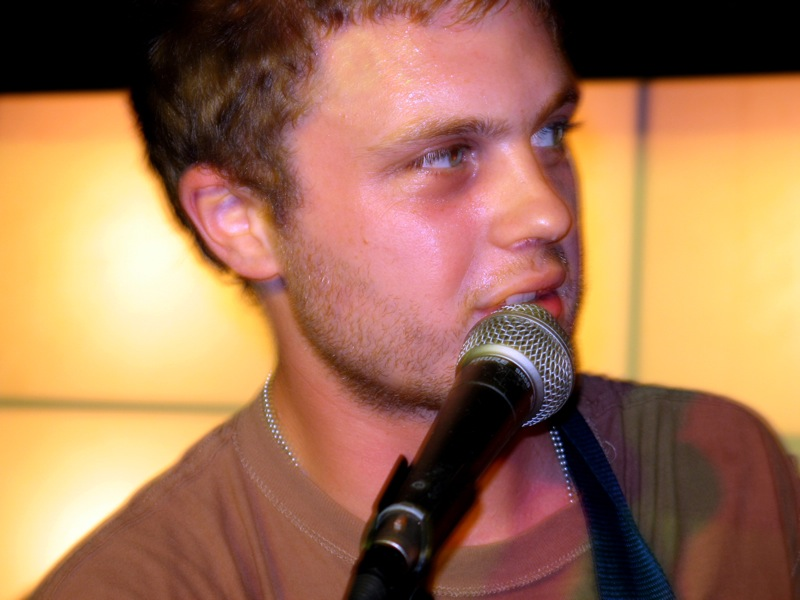
Pitt performing with Pagoda in Madrid in 2007

Pitt sang and played guitar in his band, Pagoda, whose self-titled debut album was released by Universal/Fontana/Ecstatic Peace in 2007.

Under the title Jimi Pitt and the Twins of Evil, Pitt performed "Hey Joe" with the Twins of Evil for The Dreamers soundtrack.

=== Directing ===
In January 2015, Pitt made his official directorial debut with a campaign film for fashion label Rag & Bone's Spring 2015 collection. The video features Pitt and prior co-stars actress Astrid Bergès-Frisbey—the new face of Rag & Bone womenswear—and British actor Stephen Graham, Pitt's Boardwalk Empire and I Origins. Says Rag & Bone co-head, Marcus Wainwright, "[Pitt]'s a really talented actor and musician, and he came to us with this concept of doing a film-based campaign. We thought it was awesome and well worth trying." Pitt has also directed a number of music videos for Pagoda.

In 2020, he revealed he had recently directed a film in Italy called Nocturnal, although there is no release date set yet.

=== Modeling ===
Pitt has modeled for numerous designer campaigns. In 2012, he was named the face of Italian fashion house Prada and modeled their menswear line. He was also featured in two separate Rag & Bone campaigns prior to the release of his self-directed campaign—once for Fall/Winter 2013, with French actress Léa Seydoux, and once for Fall/Winter 2014, with actress Winona Ryder.

== Personal life ==
Pitt was engaged to Asia Argento from 2003 to 2004. In 2009, Pitt revealed that he had been "engaged for a long time now" to model Jamie Bochert and said of her: "She's my other half." The two ended their relationship in 2014.

=== Arrests ===
In July 2022, Pitt was arrested and charged with assault and petty larceny after allegedly hitting another man multiple times and taking his phone. In September, Pitt was hospitalized and deemed "emotionally disturbed" after being accused of throwing items at people from the rooftop of a building.

On May 2, 2025, Pitt was arrested and arraigned at the Kings Supreme Criminal Court in Brooklyn in connection with incidents reported to have occurred between 2020 and 2021. He faced charges including two counts of first-degree sexual abuse, as well as charges of assault involving injury with a cinder block and second-degree strangulation. Pitt is alleged to have engaged in at least four incidents of sex abuse. In July, Pitt released a series of screenshots to TMZ showing texts from his ex-girlfriend in which she appears to give her consent to most of the sexual acts, while claiming to have lied about the other charges. Faced with 25 years in prison if convicted, Pitt pleaded not guilty to nine charges.

== Filmography ==
=== Film ===
Year	Title	Role	Notes
1998	Hi-Life	Boy Teen	
1998	54	Dance Student	Uncredited
1999	Even Housewives in Minnesota Have Those Daydreams	Petey	
2000	Finding Forrester	John Coleridge	
2001	Bully	Donny Semenec	
2001	The Yellow Bird	Stuff	
2001	Hedwig and the Angry Inch	Tommy Gnosis	
2002	Murder by Numbers	Justin Pendleton	
2003	Rhinoceros Eyes	Chep	
2003	The Dreamers	Matthew	
2004	The Village	Finton Coin	
2004	The Heart Is Deceitful Above All Things	Buddy	
2004	Jailbait	Randy	
2005	Last Days	Blake	
2006	Delirious	Toby Grace	
2006	The Hawk Is Dying	Fred	
2007	Funny Games	Paul	Chainsaw Award for Best Supporting Actor
2007	Silk	Hervé Joncour	
2011	Hugo	Projectionist	Uncredited
2012	Seven Psychopaths	Larry	
2014	Rob the Mob	Tommy Uva	
2014	The Smell of Us	Street Musician	Uncredited cameo
2014	I Origins	Ian Gray	Also executive producer
2015	Macadam Stories	John McKenzie	
2015	The Driver	Carmen	Short film; also director and co-writer
2015	Criminal Activities	Zach	
2016	Criminal	Jan Strook	
2017	Ghost in the Shell	Kuze	
2018	Detective Chinatown 2	James Springfield	
2019	Run with the Hunted	Oscar	
2020	The Last Days of American Crime	Kevin Cash	
2023	Asphalt City	LaFontaine	
2023	Day of the Fight	Mike Flannigan	
2023	Reptile	Eli Phillips	
2026	You Can't Win	Jack Black	Also producer and co-writer. Filmed in 2012.
TBA	Nocturnal	TBA	Director

=== Television ===
Year	Title	Role	Notes
1997	Dellaventura	Babyface	Episode "Above Reproach"
1998	Law & Order	Andy	Episode "Carrier"
1999–2000	Dawson's Creek	Henry Parker	Recurring role (season 3); 15 episodes
2002	Law & Order: Special Victims Unit	Harry Baker	Episode: "Prodigy"
2008	T Takes	The Guest in Room 113	Episode: "Room 113"
2010–2011	Boardwalk Empire	Jimmy Darmody	Main role (seasons 1–2); Screen Actors Guild Award for Outstanding Performance by an Ensemble in a Drama Series (2011–2012); Online Film & Television Association Award for Best Ensemble in a Drama Series (2012); Nominated–Critics' Choice Television Award for Best Supporting Actor in a Drama Series (2011); Nominated–Golden Nymph Award for Outstanding Actor in a Drama Series (2012); Nominated–Online Film & Television Association Award for Best Supporting Actor In A Drama Series (2012)
2014	Hannibal	Mason Verger	3 episodes Nominated–EWwy Award for Best Guest Actor, Drama (2014); Nominated–Saturn Award for Best Guest Starring Role on Television (2015)
2017	Animals.	Johnny (voice)	2 episodes
2021	Lisey's Story	Andrew Landon	Miniseries; recurring; 5 episodes

=== Music video ===
Year	Title	Artist	Role
2002	"What a Wonderful World"	Joey Ramone	Punk Guy
