= Victoria Gotti =

American television personality

- Born: November 8, 1962 (age 64); Brooklyn, New York City, U.S.
- Occupations: Writer, television personality
- Spouse: Carmine Agnello (m. 1984; div. 2003)
- Children: 3
- Father: John Gotti
- Relatives: John A. Gotti (brother); Peter Gotti (uncle); Richard V. Gotti (uncle); Gene Gotti (uncle)

Victoria Gotti (born November 8, 1962) is an American writer and television personality, known for being the daughter of Gambino crime family Mafia boss John Gotti.

== Early life ==
Victoria Gotti was born November 8, 1962, in Brooklyn. Her parents are mob boss John Gotti and Victoria (DiGiorgio) Gotti, whose father was of Italian descent, and mother was of half Italian half Russian ancestry. Gotti was raised in a two-story house in Howard Beach, New York, with her four siblings, which include brother John A. Gotti, sister Angel, and her younger brother Frank, whom she referred to as her "little doll".

== Career ==
=== Writing ===
Victoria Gotti was a columnist at the New York Post and a reporter for WNYW, the New York City flagship station of the Fox Television Network.

In 1995, Gotti wrote her first book, Women and Mitral Valve Prolapse, which was inspired by and documented her own struggle with the illness. In 1997, she published her mystery novel The Senator's Daughter, followed by more: I'll Be Watching You (1998), Superstar (2000), and Hot Italian Dish (2006). She additionally wrote the memoirs This Family of Mine: What It Was Like Growing Up Gotti (2009).

=== Television ===
From August 2004 until December 2005, Gotti was the star of Growing Up Gotti, an American reality television series on the A&E Network, on which she starred with her three sons. In August 2005, days before the third-season premiere of Growing Up Gotti, Gotti stated that she had breast cancer. However, after being accused of faking her illness by various media outlets, she admitted soon after her initial announcement that she did have precancerous cells present in her breast, rather than an actual diagnosis.

In early 2012, Gotti appeared as one of 18 contestants on the American reality television series Celebrity Apprentice, which premiered on February 19. Gotti was eliminated in week 2 of the competition.

On September 22, 2013, Gotti made a guest appearance on The Real Housewives of New Jersey alongside cast member Teresa Giudice, appearing in the season 5 episode "Hair We Go Again". She appeared on the show again in the season 6 episode "Roses Are Red, Dina Is Blue", which premiered on August 24, 2014.

In December 2014, Gotti made a guest appearance in "Storm A-Brewin'", a fifth-season episode of the VH1 reality show Mob Wives. Despite having criticized the authenticity of that show in a 2012 radio interview, in which she characterized it as a "train wreck" and "not real", Gotti appeared in the episode for a scene in which cast member Angela Raiola seeks her advice on how to resolve her conflicts with her inner circle.

On February 9, 2019, Lifetime aired the documentary film Victoria Gotti: My Father's Daughter which stars Chelsea Frei as Victoria Gotti and Maurice Benard as John Gotti. Victoria Gotti serves as the narrator, co-writer, and executive producer of this film.

== Personal life ==
In 1984, Carmine Agnello married Victoria despite her parents' disapproval. The couple had three sons, Carmine, John, and Frank. The family lived in a mansion in Old Westbury, New York, which was the filming location in 2004 for the reality television series Growing Up Gotti.

In 2003, while Agnello was in jail, Victoria Gotti divorced him on the grounds of constructive abandonment.

In May 2009, foreclosure was approved on the $3.2 million mansion that Gotti was awarded as part of her divorce from Carmine Agnello.

In November 2025, it was announced that Gotti had chronic kidney disease and required a kidney transplant, with the doner being her son, Carmine. In April 2026, Carmine was sentenced to 15 months in prison for fraudulently obtaining $1.1 million in loans from a federal program meant to help small businesses during the COVID-19 pandemic. His incarceration was delayed pending the potential surgery, but he was ultimately ordered to begin his prison term in August 2026 as the surgery had not yet occurred or been scheduled.
