= Ronnie Trucchio =

American mobster

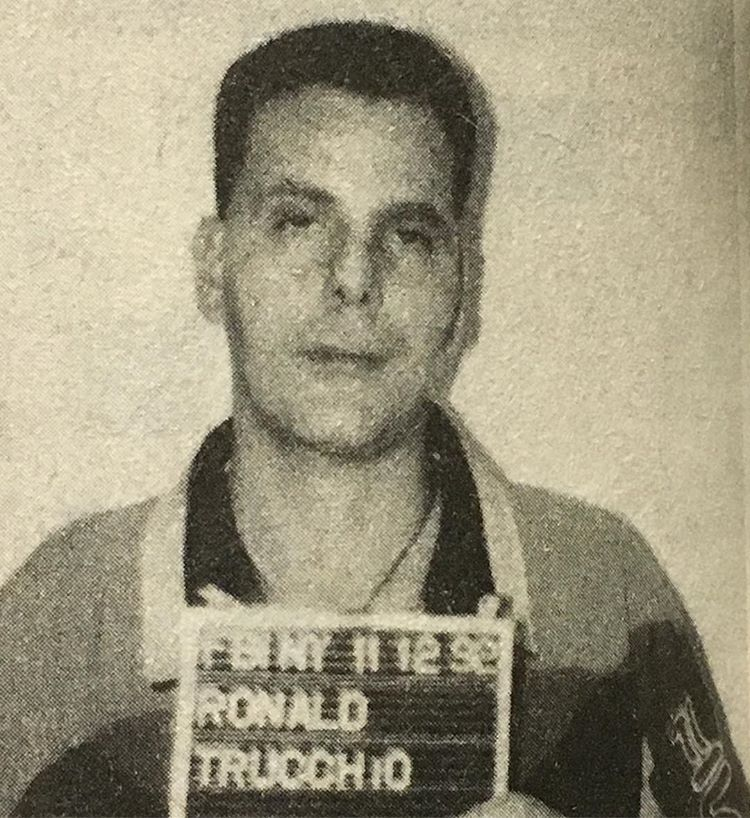
- Trucchio's November 12, 1992 FBI mugshot
- Born: Ronald Joseph Trucchio; 1951 (age 74–75); New York City, New York, U.S.
- Other name: Ronnie One Arm
- Occupation: Mobster
- Allegiance: Gambino crime family
- Convictions: Illegal gambling (2003); Racketeering (2005); Racketeering (2006)
- Penalty: 1 to 3 years' imprisonment (2003); 20 years' imprisonment (2005); Life imprisonment (2007)

Ronald Joseph Trucchio (born 1951), also known as "Ronnie One Arm", is an American mobster who rose to the position of caporegime in the Gambino crime family of New York City.

== Criminal career ==
Trucchio was born in Ocean Hill, Brooklyn and raised in Ozone Park, Queens. As a child, Trucchio was hit by an automobile and sustained severe damage to the scapula, ulna and humerus in the arm. These fractures left his arm partially paralyzed. The injury led to his nickname of "Ronnie One Arm". Trucchio is the father of reputed Gambino crime family caporegime Alphonse Trucchio. He lived in South Richmond Hill, Queens as an adult.

In 1992, Trucchio, a protegee of Anthony "Tony Lee" Guerrieri and Anthony “Fat Andy” Ruggiano, was inducted into the Gambino family.

=== The Young Guns ===
In the mid-1990s, Trucchio was promoted to caporegime and given control over the Ozone Park Boys, a Gambino crew in Queens. Trucchio reportedly drove around Ozone Park looking for recruits for his crew. He drove a silver Cadillac, wore $5,000 suits, and displayed thick rolls of bills. One police investigator compared Trucchio to Fagin, the 19th century London gang leader in the Charles Dickens novel Oliver Twist.

The Ozone Park Boys specialized in gambling, loansharking, bookmaking, fraud and wire fraud. Trucchio and Alphonse ran an illegal gambling operation that grossed approximately $30 million a year, with bettors who placed wagers as large as $15,000 on football and basketball games. Trucchio also owned a restaurant in Ozone Park that allegedly earned him $6.5 million but was forfeited by the Queens District Attorney due to charges of tax evasion and tax fraud. Also involved in criminal activities in South Florida, Trucchio's crew was frequently called "The Young Guns" and the "Liberty Posse".

In October 1995, Trucchio was allegedly involved in the shooting murders of three people in Florida. Gambino associate Mark Rizzuto was found dead in Boca Raton. Gambino associate and strip club bouncer Vincent D'Angola, along with D'Angola's dancer girlfriend Jami Schneider, were discovered dead in D'Angola's Fort Lauderdale apartment. The Gambino family suspected the two men of skimming family profits and sent other Florida crew members to murder them. Schneider may have been an innocent bystander.

By 1997, Trucchio was reportedly concerned about the number of violent acts being committed by crew members in Florida and directed Gambino soldier Michael Ciaccio to watch them. Years later, Ciaccio would testify against Trucchio in Trucchio's 2003 racketeering trial.

=== Convictions and prison ===
On December 9, 2002, Trucchio was indicted in New York state court on enterprise corruption, conspiracy, promoting gambling and possession of gambling records. The indictment stated that Trucchio conspired to engage in racketeering, murder, robbery, arson, extortion, kidnapping, drug trafficking, tampering with witnesses, retaliating against witnesses, credit card fraud, intrastate travel in aid of racketeering activity, interference with commerce by threats and violence, interstate transportation of stolen property, and thefts from interstate shipments. On April 14, 2003, Trucchio pleaded guilty to lesser charges. On October 29, 2003, Trucchio was sentenced to one to three years in state prison.

On December 4, 2003, Trucchio and other family members were indicted in federal court in Fort Lauderdale, Florida for the 1995 Florida murders, two armed robberies in New York, and the 2003 Bosshart murder in New York. On January 9, 2004, Trucchio pleaded not guilty in court to all the charges. In August 2005, Trucchio was sentenced to 20 years in federal prison on racketeering conspiracy charges. In October 2006, Trucchio and other Florida crew members went on trial in Tampa, Florida on new federal racketeering and extortion charges. Truccchio was accused of using intimidation to gain control of valet parking services for hospitals, restaurants, and adult entertainment clubs in the Tampa Bay area. In December 2006, Trucchio was convicted and in March 2007 was sentenced to life in prison.

As of December 2011, Ronald Trucchio is serving a life sentence at the United States Penitentiary (USP) in Lewisburg, Pennsylvania.

Trucchio was placed in a prison hospital in 2023. In November 2024, Tampa Judge Charlene Honeywell granted Trucchio compassionate release from prison due to his "deteriorating" medical condition.
