= Growing Up Gotti =

- Print advertisement
- Genre: Reality television
- Starring: Victoria Gotti; Frank Agnello; Carmine Agnello, Jr; John Agnello
- Opening theme: "These Boots Are Made For Walkin'" by Lil' Kim
- Country of origin: United States
- Original language: English
- No. of seasons: 3
- No. of episodes: 41

Production
- Running time: 22 minutes
- Production companies: Regan Media; GRB Productions; Wild Bill Productions

Original release
- Network: A&E
- Release: August 2, 2004 – December 5, 2005

Growing Up Gotti is an American reality television series that aired on A&E. It featured the life of Victoria Gotti, daughter of Mafia boss John Gotti, and her three sons; Frank Gotti Agnello, John Gotti Agnello Jr., and Carmine Gotti Agnello. The production of the pilot episode was announced in January 2004 with the show being picked up several months later. A&E canceled Growing Up Gotti after three seasons. In 2014, the network aired an anniversary special Growing Up Gotti: Ten Years Later.

== Episodes ==
Season	Episodes	Originally aired	
Season	Episodes	Season premiere	Season finale
1	13	August 2, 2004	December 22, 2004
2	15	January 10, 2005	August 2, 2005
3	13	August 22, 2005	December 5, 2005

== Reception ==
Shirleen Holt of Film.com said: "Victoria Gotti has the warmth of an ice pick and her sons the charm of, well, thugs." Robert Hofler, reviewing the series for Variety, said that it was too "controlled" and too focused on Victoria Gotti, who also acted as an executive producer, and that "A&E has the potential for a sleeper hit with its new reality TV show [...] but they clearly muffed the title. 'Mommy as Monster' is closer to the target." Alessandra Stanley, of The New York Times, said that the show was "a one-joke novelty item, but it is at times quite funny and Ms. Gotti is an oddly compelling figure.". Genovese Crime Family Soldier Ciro Perrone and Ralph Scopo were recorded on tape criticizing the show, with Perrone commenting "it’s a soap opera, and the kids look like girls".

== Reunion ==
On November 10, 2014, the network aired a one-hour anniversary special entitled Growing Up Gotti: Ten Years Later. The special featured Victoria Gotti and her three sons who reunited to talk about the highlights of their family reality series. Growing up Gotti: 10 Years Later was produced by Left/Right.
