= Peter Gotti =

American mobster (1939–2021)

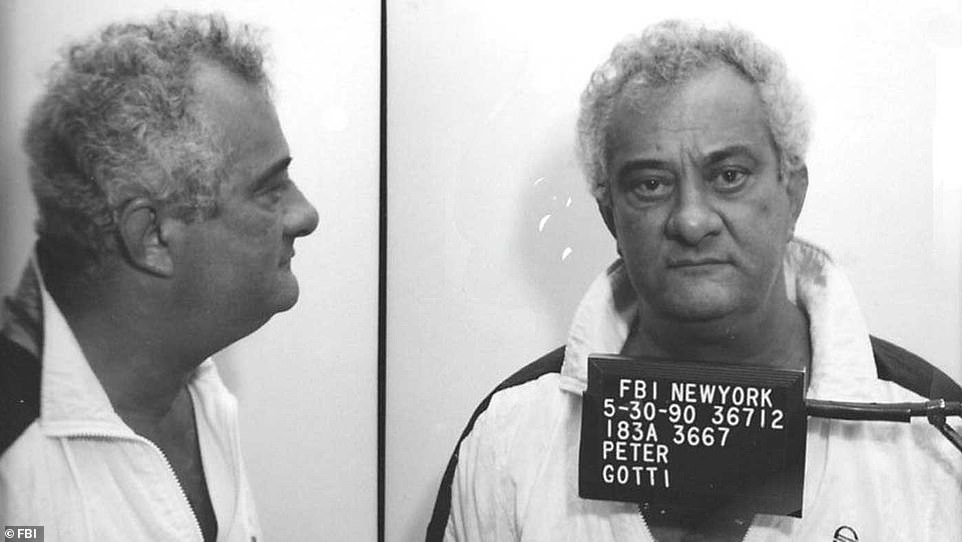
- Gotti's May 30, 1990 FBI mugshot
- Born: Peter Arthur Gotti; October 15, 1939; New York City, New York, U.S.
- Died: February 25, 2021 (aged 81); FCC Butner, Butner, North Carolina, U.S.
- Other names: "One Eyed Pete"; "Petey Boy"; "One Eye"
- Occupation: Crime boss
- Predecessor: John Gotti
- Successor: Domenico Cefalù
- Spouse: Catherine Gotti (m. 1960; div. 2006)
- Children: 2
- Relatives: John Gotti (brother); Richard V. Gotti (brother); Gene Gotti (brother); Vincent Gotti (brother); John A. Gotti (nephew); Richard G. Gotti (nephew); Victoria Gotti (niece)
- Status: Deceased
- Allegiance: Gambino crime family
- Convictions: Racketeering, extortion, money laundering (2003); Racketeering, extortion, murder conspiracy (2004)
- Penalty: Nine years and four months' imprisonment (2004); 25 years' imprisonment (2005)

Peter Arthur Gotti (October 15, 1939 – February 25, 2021) was an American mobster who served as boss of the Gambino crime family of New York following the imprisonment of his younger brother John Gotti.

== Early life ==
Gotti was born in the Bronx, New York, on October 15, 1939. He was one of 13 children (two had died at birth) of John Joseph Gotti Sr. and Philomena "Fannie" DeCarlo. Gotti's brothers included John J. Gotti, Gene Gotti, Richard V. Gotti, and Vincent Gotti, all of whom joined the Gambino crime family. The brothers grew up in East New York, Brooklyn. Gotti married Catherine in 1960 and fathered two children, Peter Gotti Jr and Linda Gotti. Peter Gotti's nickname "One Eye" derives from blindness from glaucoma in one eye.

== Criminal career ==
Around 1960, at age 21, Gotti started working as an associate for the Gambino family. In 1988, at age 49, the family inducted Gotti as a "made man". John J. Gotti designated Peter as caretaker of the Bergin Hunt and Fish Club, and as a driver for John and Gene. By 1989, Peter was promoted to capo. John J. Gotti did not believe Peter had the ability to lead the crime family, which led to Peter's reputation as "the Dumbest Don".

Like his brother, Gotti had a legitimate job as a sanitation worker for the New York City Department of Sanitation. Gotti eventually retired from the Sanitation Department with a disability pension after injuring his head against the back end of a garbage truck.

=== Rise to leadership ===
In April 1992, his brother, John J. Gotti (Jr.), received a life sentence for racketeering and related offenses. His brother asserted his prerogative to retain his title as boss until his death or retirement, with John's son John A. Gotti and Peter relaying orders on his behalf. Federal prosecutors say Peter became head of the Gambino organization after Gotti Jr. was sent to prison in 1999, and is believed to have formally succeeded his brother John J. Gotti shortly before the latter's death in June 2002. According to DeCavalcante family capo-turned-government witness Anthony Rotondo, Gotti was recognized as the acting boss of the Gambino family at meeting of the Five Families at the Casa Blanca restaurant in Queens in May 2001.

=== Conviction and imprisonment ===
In June 2002, a few days before his brother John's death, Gotti was indicted on federal racketeering charges. During Gotti's trial, federal prosecutors released information revealing that Gotti was having an affair with Marjorie Alexander, a longtime girlfriend. Alexander then publicly acknowledged the liaison and declared her love for Gotti. In response, Gotti berated Alexander for causing the publicity and broke off all contact with her. Alexander later committed suicide in 2004. During this time, Gotti's wife Catherine filed for divorce, which was finalized in 2006.

On March 17, 2003, Gotti was convicted of extortion, money laundering, and racketeering activities centered on the Brooklyn and Staten Island waterfronts, and for the attempted extortion of film actor Steven Seagal. On April 15, 2004, Judge Frederic Block of the United States District Court for the Eastern District of New York sentenced Gotti to nine years and four months in prison for the charges. During the trial, Gotti's lawyers stated that he was blind in one eye and suffered from thyroid goiter, sciatica, emphysema, rheumatoid arthritis, postconcussion syndrome, and depression.

On December 22, 2004, Gotti was convicted in a separate trial of racketeering charges related to extortion in the construction industry and conspiring to murder government informant and former Gambino underboss Sammy Gravano. On July 27, 2005, Judge Richard C. Casey sentenced Gotti to 25 years in prison for the charges. Gotti was imprisoned at the Federal Correctional Complex, Butner. His projected release date was September 10, 2031.

During the early and mid 2000s, Gotti held onto power through old Gotti loyalists who ran the family while he was imprisoned. These loyalists included Arnold "Zeke" Squitieri and John D'Amico. However after multiple indictments and weakening of the Gotti faction by law enforcement efforts, by the late 2000s following D'Amico’s imprisonment the Sicilian faction took de facto control of the family and Gotti was kept in his place as boss in name only. However in July 2011, Domenico Cefalù reportedly replaced Gotti as Gambino boss, ending his reign as boss and virtually his career as a mobster since he wouldn’t be released before dying in 2021.

== Death ==
Gotti's requests for compassionate release under the First Step Act, citing his failing health, were both denied: that of July 2019 in September, and that of December 2019 in January 2020.

On February 25, 2021, Gotti died of natural causes at the Federal Correctional Complex in Butner, North Carolina, at the age of 81.

American Mafia
Preceded by John "Junior" Gotti	Gambino crime family Acting boss 1999–2002	Succeeded by Arnold "Zeke" Squitieri
Preceded by John Gotti	Gambino crime family Boss; 2002–2011	Succeeded by Domenico Cefalu
