= John A. Gotti =

American mobster (born 1964)

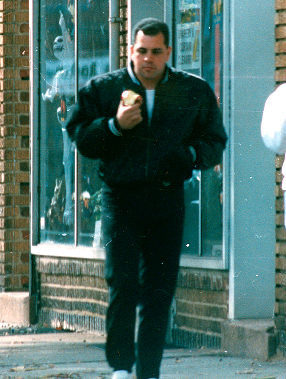
- Gotti in an FBI surveillance photograph (published 2010)
- Born: John Angelo Gotti; February 14, 1964 (age 62); Queens, New York, U.S.
- Other names: Junior Gotti, Teflon Jr., Deadlock Don, Dumbfella
- Occupations: Crime boss, author
- Spouse: Kimberly Albanese (m. 1990)
- Children: 6
- Parent(s): John Gotti; Victoria DiGiorgio
- Relatives: Victoria Gotti (sister); Angel Gotti (sister); Peter Gotti (uncle); Richard V. Gotti (uncle); Gene Gotti (uncle)
- Allegiance: Gambino crime family
- Convictions: Racketeering, extortion (1998)
- Penalty: Six years and five months' imprisonment and fined $1 million (1999)

John Angelo Gotti (born February 14, 1964) is an American former mobster who was the acting boss of the Gambino crime family from 1992 to 1999. He became acting boss when the boss of the family, his father John Gotti, was sent to prison. The younger Gotti was imprisoned for racketeering in 1999, and between 2004 and 2009 he was a defendant in four racketeering trials, each of which ended in a mistrial. In January 2010, federal prosecutors announced that they would no longer seek to prosecute Gotti for those charges.

== Early life ==
John Angelo Gotti was born in Queens, New York City on February 14, 1964, to American mobster John Gotti and Victoria DiGiorgio Gotti, whose father was of Italian descent, and mother was of half-Italian half-Russian (Jewish) ancestry. Gotti was raised in a two-story house in Howard Beach, New York, with his four siblings, which include sisters Victoria Gotti, and Angel, and brothers Frank and Peter. Angelo Ruggiero was his godfather and middle namesake, whom he and his siblings considered an uncle. Gotti attended New York Military Academy in his youth.

After graduating school, Gotti's father helped him start a trucking business, Samson Trucking Company, and after the business failed, helped him get a position in the Carpenters Union.

== Leadership of the Gambino crime family ==
According to federal prosecutors, Gotti was inducted into the Gambino crime family on Christmas Eve 1988. According to fellow mobster Michael DiLeonardo who was initiated the same night, Gravano held the ceremony to keep Gotti from being accused of nepotism. He was named a caporegime (captain) in 1990, and is believed to be the youngest captain in the Gambino family's history.

In April 1992, his father, John J. Gotti, received a life sentence for racketeering and related offenses. His father asserted his right to retain his title as boss until his death or retirement, with his brother Peter, as well as Gotti Jr., relaying orders on his behalf.

Remembering how his father had been brought down by FBI bugs, Gotti adopted a more secretive way of doing business. He discussed mob business mainly through "walk-talks," or conversations held while walking alongside trusted captains. He also tried to pose as a legitimate businessman. However, several of his button men didn't think much of him, regarding him as incompetent. He was not nearly as good a negotiator as his father had been, and the Gambinos lost out on several disputes with the other families. The Genovese family was so unimpressed with Gotti that it refused to deal with him at all. In 1995, Charles Carneglia and John Alite were involved in a major conspiracy to murder Gotti.

In a 1997 search of the basement of a property owned by Gotti, the FBI found a typed list of the names of the made members of his organization, as well as $348,700 in cash, a list of the guests who attended his wedding, along with the dollar amount of their wedding gifts (totaling more than $350,000), as well as two handguns. Also found was a list of several men who were inducted into other families in 1991 and 1992; a longstanding rule in the New York Mafia calls for prospective members to be vetted by the other families before being inducted. However, normally these lists are destroyed almost as soon as the inductions take place. The discovery enraged Gotti's father as well as the other bosses, since it put dozens of other mafiosi at risk of government scrutiny. The episode earned him the nickname "Dumbfella" in the New York media.

== 1999 racketeering charges ==
By 1998, when he was indicted on racketeering charges under the Racketeer Influenced and Corrupt Organizations (RICO) Act, Gotti Jr. was believed to be the acting boss of the family. Many of the charges related to attempts to extort money from the owners and employees of Scores, an upscale strip club in Manhattan. According to the indictment, the Gambinos had forced the owners of Scores to pay $1 million over a six-year period in order to stay in business, with Gotti's share of the money totaling $100,000. In addition to the lists seized in the 1997 raid, prosecutors obtained transcripts of prison conversations in which Gotti Jr. received advice from his father on how to run the family and infamously a typed list of made members and associates who were being proposed for membership from multiple other families. On April 5, 1999, faced with overwhelming evidence, Gotti Jr. pleaded guilty to four acts of racketeering, including bribery, extortion, and the threat of violence, against his father's advice. His lawyer said he decided to accept a plea bargain because he believed that he would be subjected to repeated prosecutions in multiple jurisdictions if he did not. On September 4, 1999, Gotti Jr. was sentenced to six years and five months in prison and fined $1 million. Federal prosecutors said his uncle, Peter Gotti, became head of the Gambino organization after Gotti Jr. was sent to prison, and he is believed to have formally succeeded his brother shortly before Gotti Sr.'s death in June 2002. Gotti Jr.'s indictment had brought stress on his parents' marriage; his mother, up to that point unaware of her son's involvement in the Mafia, blamed her husband for ruining her son's life, and threatened to leave him unless he allowed Gotti Jr. to leave the mob.

== 2004 racketeering and kidnapping charges ==
In 2004, months before he was released from prison, Gotti was charged in an 11-count racketeering indictment which included an alleged plot to kidnap Curtis Sliwa, founder of the Guardian Angels, as well as securities fraud, extortion and loansharking. A radio talk show host for WABC, Sliwa had allegedly angered the family by denouncing the elder Gotti as "Public Enemy #1" on his show. During the trial two former associates, Michael DiLeonardo and Joseph D'Angelo, testified against Gotti. Through his attorney Jeffrey Lichtman, Gotti admitted that he had been involved in the Gambino crime family in the 1990s, and had even been slated to lead the organization after his father was sent to jail in 1992, but claimed he had left criminal life behind after his conviction in 1999. Three juries eventually deadlocked on the charges, the last in 2006, and federal prosecutors decided not to pursue a fourth trial.

== 2008 racketeering charges ==
In August 2008, Gotti was arrested and indicted on racketeering and murder conspiracy charges brought in Florida. The charges stemmed from an alleged drug trafficking ring Gotti operated along with former associate-turned-government witness John Alite, as well as from the murders of George Grosso in 1988, Louis DiBono in 1990, and Bruce John Gotterup in 1991. Prosecutors charge that the ring distributed at least five kilograms of cocaine in the late 1980s and early 1990s. Gotti's trial was later moved to New York, where he pleaded not guilty, and began in September 2009.

In January 2008, Alite pleaded guilty to two murders, four murder conspiracies, at least eight shootings, and two attempted shootings, as well as armed home invasions and armed robberies in New York, New Jersey, Pennsylvania, and Florida, stemming from his alleged involvement in a Gambino crew in Tampa, Florida. Alite agreed to testify in the trial of Gambino family enforcer Charles Carneglia, who was found guilty of four murders and is now serving a life sentence. He then served as a key prosecution witness against Gotti.

During the trial, Gotti allegedly threatened Alite by mouthing the words "I'll kill you", and engaged in a shouting match with his former associate. After the incident, Victoria Gotti told the New York Daily News that Alite was "a pathological liar—a rat caught in a proverbial trap, caught in his own lies..." Alite testified that Gotti was responsible for at least eight murders, among other crimes.

On December 1, 2009, the 12 jurors announced that they had failed to reach a unanimous verdict on all the charges and the judge declared a mistrial. After the trial, jurors said that they did not find the prosecution’s witnesses to be credible, particularly Alite. One of the jurors said, "They should stop this now—it's ridiculous," while another said, "It's abusive. It's almost become a mockery." Gotti was released on December 1, 2009. After Gotti's fourth mistrial, federal prosecutors indicated that they would not seek another trial against Gotti.

Gotti Jr. maintains that he has since left the Gambino family, and in a 2015 interview with the New York Daily News, Gotti denied claims that he was an informant, claiming that he did give the FBI information but that it was false information, and that no indictments resulted from the information he gave agents.

== Personal life ==
In 1990, Gotti married Kimberly Albanese. They have six children and live in Oyster Bay Cove on Long Island's North Shore. His son, John Gotti III, is a professional mixed martial artist and professional boxer. Gotti III was KO'd in a professional boxing match by Daniel Augare of the Blackfeet Nation on October 11, 2025 at Foxwoods Resort Casino in Connecticut.

In November 2013, Gotti was stabbed while breaking up a fight in Syosset, New York.

Gotti authored a 2015 book, Shadow of My Father.

== Biographical film ==
In September 2010, Fiore Films announced that it had secured the rights from Gotti to produce a movie about his life, in particular his relationship with his father. According to Variety, several producers had expressed interest, but Gotti chose Fiore, a small, newly created production company. The movie, tentatively titled Gotti: in the Shadow of My Father, was to be directed by Barry Levinson. John Travolta was cast to star as Gotti's father, and Travolta's wife, Kelly Preston, played his on-screen wife, Victoria Gotti. Junior Gotti was played by Spencer Lofranco. The production of the film eventually lost Barry Levinson. On July 25, 2016, principal photography on the film, renamed to Gotti, had begun, with Kevin Connolly as director. The film was released on June 15, 2018. On June 9, 2018 the documentary TV miniseries Gotti: Godfather and Son was released.

American Mafia
Preceded by John Gotti as boss	Gambino crime family Acting boss 1994–1996	Succeeded by Nicholas "Little Nick" Corozzo
Preceded by Nicholas "Little Nick" Corozzo	Gambino crime family Acting boss 1997–1999	Succeeded by Peter "Petey Boy" Gotti
