= Killings of Thomas and Rosemarie Uva =

Thomas Uva and Rosemarie Uva (often misspelled Rosemary or Rose Marie) were married ex-cons from Ozone Park, Queens.

== Biography ==
Thomas Uva got out of prison in May 1992 at the age of 28. He and his 31-year-old wife, who worked as the getaway driver, started holding up mafia social clubs throughout New York City that were owned by the Gambino crime family and the Bonanno crime family. As a result, mafia families put out an "open contract" to kill the couple.

On the morning of Christmas Eve 1992, the two decided to go out on a last-minute Christmas shopping drive. They left their Ozone Park home and got into their car. As they got to the intersection of Woodhaven Boulevard and 103rd Avenue, Dominick Pizzonia, a Gambino family capo, allegedly shot the couple several times in the head.

Their bodies were discovered moments later when the car rolled through the intersection, collided with an oncoming vehicle, and came to rest against the front curb of nearby residence. The victims, and their killer, all lived in the same neighborhood of Ozone Park, about 0.5 mi (0.80 km) from the murder scene. There have also been speculations that the murders were done by Bonanno family soldiers Anthony Donato and Vincent Basciano.

On May 11, 2007, Dominick Pizzonia was convicted of plotting to kill the couple, but the federal jury found the government did not prove he had actually killed them. Former Bonanno family underboss Sal Vitale said that he and Joseph Massino had a conversation with John Gotti Jr. who told them, "we took care of it". For years, investigators suspected Junior Gotti, along with other members of his immediate crew, played a role in the murder but was never charged, and Gotti denied he had any involvement.

Their story has been fictionalized in the 2014 film Rob the Mob and the 2015 film The Wannabe.
