= Richard G. Gotti =

American mobster (born 1967)

- Born: November 30, 1967 (age 58)
- Occupation: Mobster
- Father: Richard V. Gotti
- Relatives: John Gotti (uncle); John A. Gotti (cousin); Victoria Gotti (cousin)
- Status: Released
- Allegiance: Gambino crime family
- Conviction: Racketeering

Richard G. Gotti (born November 30, 1967) is an American mobster who is a member of the Gambino crime family. His father is Gambino capo Richard V. Gotti and cousins are capo John A. "Junior" Gotti, former reality television star Victoria Gotti, and Peter Gotti Jr. His uncle was Gambino boss John Gotti.

== Life and career ==
On November 29, 2001, federal and state agents executed a search warrant on Gotti and seized approximately $12,000 in cash from Gotti's pockets at his home in Valley Stream, New York. On June 5, 2002, Gotti was indicted on racketeering charges. During the trial, Gotti's lawyer claimed that the money came from the preschool run by Gotti and his wife. The government said it was a payoff from a Gambino crew. On March 17, 2003, Gotti was convicted on racketeering charges. He was sent to Ashland Federal Correctional Institution (FCI) in Ashland, Kentucky. He was released on March 2, 2007. In February 2008, Gotti was named as a defendant in the Operation Old Bridge indictments.

On February 22, 2015, he was released from Schuylkill Federal Correctional Institution (FCI) in Minersville, Pennsylvania.
