= John Gotti =

American mobster (1940–2002)

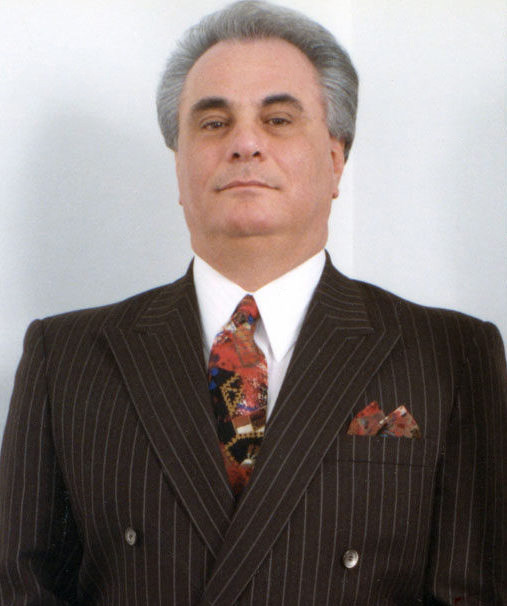
- 1990 mugshot of Gotti
- Born: John Joseph Gotti Jr. October 27, 1940; The Bronx, New York City, U.S.
- Died: June 10, 2002 (aged 61); MCFP Springfield, Missouri, U.S.
- Resting place: St. John Cemetery Queens, New York City
- Other names: The Teflon Don; The Dapper Don; Johnny Boy; The Chief
- Occupation: Crime boss
- Predecessor: Paul Castellano
- Successor: Peter Gotti
- Spouse: Victoria DiGiorgio (m. 1962)
- Children: 5, including John and Victoria
- Relatives: Peter Gotti (brother); Richard V. Gotti (brother); Gene Gotti (brother); Vincent Gotti (brother); Richard G. Gotti (nephew); Carmine Agnello (son-in-law)
- Status: Deceased
- Allegiance: Gambino crime family
- Convictions: Hijacking (1968); Attempted manslaughter (1975); Murder, conspiracy, conspiracy to commit murder, loansharking, racketeering, obstruction of justice, illegal gambling, tax evasion (1992)
- Penalty: 3 years imprisonment (1968) 4 years imprisonment (1973) Life imprisonment without the possibility of parole and fined $250,000 (1992)

John Joseph Gotti Jr. (Note: The subject of this article is also referred to as John Gotti Sr. in contexts discussing his son, John A. Gotti.) (/ˈɡɒti/ GOT-ee, Italian: [ˈɡɔtti]; October 27, 1940 – June 10, 2002) was an American mafioso and boss of the Gambino crime family in New York City. He ordered and helped to orchestrate the murder of Gambino boss Paul Castellano in December 1985 and took over the family shortly thereafter, leading what was described as the most powerful crime syndicate in the United States.

Gotti and his brothers grew up in poverty and turned to a life of crime at an early age. He quickly became one of the Gambino family's biggest earners and a protégé of Aniello Dellacroce, the family's underboss, operating out of Ozone Park, Queens. Following the FBI's indictment of members of his crew for selling narcotics, Gotti began to fear that Castellano would kill him and his brother Gene in retribution. As this fear continued to grow, and amidst growing dissent over Castellano's leadership, Gotti arranged his murder.

At his peak, Gotti was one of the most powerful and dangerous crime bosses in the United States. While his peers generally avoided attracting attention, especially from the media, Gotti became known as "the Dapper Don" for his expensive clothes and outspoken personality in front of news cameras. He was later given the nickname "the Teflon Don" after three high-profile trials in the 1980s resulted in acquittals, though it was later revealed that the trials had been tainted by jury tampering, juror misconduct and witness intimidation. Law enforcement continued gathering evidence against Gotti, who reportedly earned between $5 million and $20 million per year as Gambino boss.

Gotti's underboss, Salvatore "Sammy the Bull" Gravano, aided the Federal Bureau of Investigation (FBI) in convicting Gotti; in 1991, Gravano agreed to turn state's evidence and testify against Gotti after hearing the boss make disparaging remarks about him on a wiretap that implicated them both in several murders. In 1992, Gotti was convicted of five murders, conspiracy to commit murder, racketeering, obstruction of justice, tax evasion, illegal gambling, extortion and loansharking. He was sentenced to life imprisonment without parole and was transferred to United States Penitentiary, Marion, in Illinois.

Gotti died of throat cancer on June 10, 2002, at the United States Medical Center for Federal Prisoners in Springfield, Missouri. According to Anthony "Gaspipe" Casso, the former underboss of the Lucchese crime family, "what John Gotti did was the beginning of the end of Cosa Nostra."

== Early life ==
John Gotti was born on October 27, 1940, in the New York City borough of the Bronx. He was the fifth of the thirteen children (two had died at birth) of John Joseph Gotti Sr. and Philomena "Fannie" DeCarlo. Both of Gotti's parents were born in New York, but it is presumed that his grandparents were from San Giuseppe Vesuviano, in the Naples province of Southern Italy, because his parents were married and had lived for some time.

Gotti was one of five brothers who became made men in the Gambino crime family: Eugene "Gene" Gotti was initiated before John due to the latter's incarceration, Peter Gotti was initiated under John's leadership in 1988 and Richard V. Gotti was identified as a caporegime (captain, or head of a "crew") by 2002. The fifth, Vincent, was initiated in 2002.

By the time he reached the age of 12, Gotti's family settled in East New York, Brooklyn, where he grew up in poverty alongside his brothers. His father worked irregularly as a day laborer. As an adult, Gotti came to resent his father for being unable to provide for his family. In school he had a history of truancy and bullying other students, and ultimately dropped out of Franklin K. Lane High School at the age of 16.

Gotti was involved in street gangs associated with New York mafiosi from the age of 12. When he was aged 14, he was attempting to steal a cement mixer from a construction site when it fell, crushing his toes; this injury left him with a permanent limp. After leaving school, Gotti devoted himself to working with the mob-associated Fulton-Rockaway Boys gang, where he met and befriended fellow future Gambino mobsters Angelo Ruggiero and Wilfred "Willie Boy" Johnson.

Gotti met his future wife, Victoria DiGiorgio, who was of half-Italian and half-Russian descent, at a bar in 1958. The couple were married on March 6, 1962. According to Federal Bureau of Investigation (FBI) documents, DiGiorgio was married previously and had one child by that marriage. Gotti and his wife had five children: Angela, Victoria, John Jr., Frank (d. 1980) and Peter. Gotti attempted to work legitimately in 1962 as a presser in a coat factory and as an assistant truck driver. However, he could not stay crime-free and, by 1966, had been jailed twice.

== Gambino crime family ==
=== Associate ===
As early as his teens, Gotti was running errands for Carmine Fatico, a soldier in the Gambino family, then known as the Anastasia family under the leadership of boss Albert Anastasia. Gotti carried out truck hijackings at Idlewild Airport together with his brother Gene and friend Ruggiero. During this time, he befriended fellow mob hijacker and future Bonanno family boss Joseph Massino, and was given the nicknames "Black John" and "Crazy Horse." It was around this time that Gotti met his mentor, Gambino underboss Aniello "Neil" Dellacroce.

In February 1968, United Airlines employees identified Gotti as having signed for stolen merchandise; the FBI arrested him for that hijacking soon after. Gotti was arrested a third time for hijacking while out on bail two months later, this time for stealing a load of cigarettes worth $50,000 on the New Jersey Turnpike. Later that year, Gotti pleaded guilty to the hijacking of Northwest Airlines cargo trucks and was sentenced to three years at Lewisburg Federal Penitentiary.

Gotti and Ruggiero were paroled in 1972 and returned to their old crew at the Bergin Hunt and Fish Club in Queens, still working under Fatico. Gotti took responsibility for managing the Bergin crew's illegal gambling operation, where he proved himself to be an effective enforcer. Fatico was indicted on loansharking charges in 1972; as a condition of his release, he could not associate with known felons. Gotti was not yet a made man due to the membership books' having been closed following the 1957 Apalachin meeting, but Fatico named him acting captain of the Bergin crew soon after he was paroled. In this new role, Gotti frequently traveled to Dellacroce's headquarters at the Ravenite Social Club in Manhattan to brief the underboss on the crew's activities. Dellacroce had already taken a liking to Gotti, and the two became even closer during this time. The two were very similar—‌both had strong violent streaks, cursed frequently and were heavy gamblers.

After Emanuel Gambino, nephew to boss Carlo Gambino, was kidnapped and murdered in 1973, Gotti was assigned to the hit team alongside Ruggiero and fellow enforcer Ralph Galione to search for the main suspect, gangster James McBratney. The three men botched their attempt to abduct McBratney at a Staten Island bar when they attempted to "arrest" him while posing as police detectives, and Galione shot McBratney dead when his accomplices managed to restrain him. Gotti was identified by eyewitnesses and by a police insider, and was arrested for the killing in June 1974. He was able to strike a plea bargain, however, with the help of attorney Roy Cohn, and was sentenced to four years' imprisonment for attempted manslaughter for his part in the hit. Following Gotti's death, he was also identified by Massino as the killer of Vito Borelli, a Gambino associate murdered in 1975.

Remo Franceschini, a member of the New York City Police Department (NYPD) from 1957 to 1991 who specialized in organized crime, was asked in 1993 how he knew at an early stage that Gotti would become a major figure in the Mafia; he said, “He was charismatic and a leader. He wasn't a womanizer. He spent all his time with his men. He also had a very sharp mind and total recall. And he exuded toughness. There were few men who would go against him."

=== Captain ===
On October 15, 1976, Carlo Gambino died at his home of natural causes. Against expectations, he had appointed Paul Castellano, his cousin and brother-in-law, to succeed him over his underboss Dellacroce. Gambino appeared to believe that the family would benefit from Castellano's focus on white-collar crime. Dellacroce was in prison for tax evasion at the time and was therefore unable to contest the succession. Castellano's position as boss was confirmed at a meeting on November 24, with a recently-released Dellacroce present. Castellano arranged for Dellacroce to remain as underboss while directly running the family's affairs. While Dellacroce accepted Castellano's succession, the deal effectively split the Gambino family into two rival factions: Castellano's in Brooklyn, and Dellacroce's in Manhattan.

In 1976, the Gambino family's membership books were reportedly reopened. Gotti was released in July 1977, after two years' imprisonment; he was subsequently initiated into the family, now under the command of Castellano, and immediately promoted to replace Fatico as captain of the Bergin crew. The crew reported directly to Dellacroce as part of the concessions given by Castellano to keep Dellacroce as underboss, and Gotti was regarded as Dellacroce's protégé. Under Gotti, the crew were Dellacroce's biggest earners. Besides his cut of his subordinates' earnings, Gotti ran his own loansharking operation and held a no-show job as a plumbing supply salesman. Unconfirmed allegations by FBI informants claimed that Gotti also financed drug deals.

In December 1978, Gotti assisted in the Lufthansa heist at Kennedy Airport, the largest unrecovered cash robbery in history. He had made arrangements for the getaway van to be crushed and baled at a scrapyard in Brooklyn. However, the driver of the van, Parnell "Stacks" Edwards, failed to follow orders; rather than driving the vehicle to the scrapyard, he parked it near a fire hydrant and went to sleep at his girlfriend's apartment.

Gotti mostly tried to distance his personal family from his life of crime, with the exception of his son John Jr., who was a mob associate by 1982. However, on March 18, 1980, Gotti's youngest son, twelve-year-old Frank, was run over and killed on a family friend's minibike by a neighbor named John Favara. Frank's death was ruled an accident, but Favara subsequently received death threats and was attacked by Gotti's wife with a baseball bat when he visited their home to apologize. Four months later, Favara disappeared and was presumed murdered. Accounts have differed on what was done with his body. One account said that Favara was dismembered alive with a chainsaw, and that his remains were stuffed into a barrel filled with concrete and dumped into the ocean, or buried somewhere on the lot of a chop shop. In January 2009, court papers filed by federal prosecutors in Brooklyn contained allegations that mob hitman Charles Carneglia killed Favara and disposed of his body in acid. Gotti is widely assumed to have ordered Favara's murder despite him and his family leaving on vacation for Florida three days prior.

Gotti was indicted on two occasions in his last two years as captain of the Bergin crew, with both cases coming to trial after his ascension to boss of the Gambino family. In September 1984, he had an altercation with a refrigerator mechanic named Romual Piecyk and was subsequently charged with assault and robbery. In 1985, he was indicted alongside Dellacroce and several Bergin crew members in a racketeering case by Assistant U.S. Attorney Diane Giacalone. The indictment revealed that Gotti's friend and co-defendant, Wilfred Johnson, had been an FBI informant.

=== Taking over the Gambino family ===
Gotti quickly became dissatisfied with Castellano's leadership of the Gambino family, regarding the new boss as being too isolated and greedy. Like other members of the family, he also personally disliked Castellano. The boss lacked street credibility, and those who had paid their dues running street-level jobs did not respect him. Gotti had an economic interest as well; he had a longtime dispute with Castellano on the split Gotti took from truck hijackings at Kennedy Airport.

Gotti was also rumored to be expanding into drug dealing, a lucrative trade Castellano had banned under threat of death. In August 1983, Ruggiero and Gotti's brother Gene were arrested for dealing heroin, based primarily on recordings from a bug in Ruggiero's house. Castellano demanded transcripts of the tapes; when Ruggiero refused, he threatened to demote Gotti.

In 1984, Castellano was arrested and indicted in a RICO case for the crimes of Gambino hitman Roy DeMeo and his crew. The following year, he received a second indictment for his role on the Commission, the Mafia's governing body. Facing life imprisonment for either case, Castellano arranged for Gotti to serve as acting boss alongside Thomas Bilotti, Castellano's favorite captain, and Thomas Gambino in his absence. Gotti, meanwhile, began conspiring with fellow disgruntled captains Frank DeCicco and Joseph Armone and soldiers Sammy "the Bull" Gravano and Robert DiBernardo (collectively dubbed "The Fist") to overthrow Castellano, insisting, despite the boss' inaction, that Castellano would eventually try to kill him. Armone's support was critical; as a respected old-timer who dated back to the family's founder, Vincent Mangano, he would lend needed credibility to the conspirators' cause.

It had long been a rule in the Mafia that a boss could only be killed with the approval of a majority of the Commission. Indeed, Gotti's planned hit would have been the first unsanctioned hit on a boss of the Five Families since Frank Costello was nearly killed in 1957 and would have been the first on any boss since Angelo Bruno in 1980. Gotti knew that it would be too risky to solicit support from the other four bosses, since they had longstanding ties to Castellano. To get around this, he sought the support of several important figures of his generation in the Lucchese, Colombo and Bonanno families. He did not consider approaching the Genovese family; Castellano's ties with Genovese boss Vincent "The Chin" Gigante were so close that any overture to a Genovese soldier would have been a tipoff. However, Gotti could also count on the complicity of Gambino consigliere Joseph N. Gallo.

After Dellacroce died of cancer on December 2, 1985, Castellano revised his succession plan, appointing Bilotti as underboss to Thomas Gambino as the sole acting boss, while making plans to break up Gotti's crew. Infuriated by this, and by Castellano's refusal to attend Dellacroce's wake, Gotti resolved to kill his boss. When DeCicco tipped off Gotti that he would be having a meeting with Castellano and several other Gambino mobsters at Sparks Steak House on December 16, Gotti seized the opportunity. Both Castellano and Bilotti were ambushed and shot dead by assassins under Gotti's direction when they arrived that evening. Gotti watched the hit from his car alongside Gravano.

Several days after the murder, Gotti was named to a three-man committee, along with Gallo and DeCicco, to temporarily run the Gambino family pending the election of a new boss. It was also announced that an internal investigation into Castellano's murder was underway. However, it was an open secret that Gotti was acting boss in all but name, and nearly all of the family's captains knew he had engineered the hit. Gotti was formally named the new boss of the family at a meeting of twenty captains held on January 15, 1986. He appointed DeCicco as the new underboss while retaining Gallo as consigliere.

== Crime boss ==
Identified as both Castellano's likely murderer and his successor, Gotti rose to fame throughout 1986. At the time of his takeover, the Gambino family was regarded as the most powerful American Mafia family, with an annual income of $500 million. In the book Underboss, Gravano estimated that Gotti had a personal annual income of no less than $5 million during his years as boss, and more likely between $10 million and $12 million. To protect himself legally, Gotti banned members of the family from accepting plea bargains that acknowledged the existence of the organization.

=== "The Teflon Don" ===
Gotti often smiled and waved at news cameras at his trials, which gained him favor with some of the general public. His newfound notoriety had at least one positive effect; upon the revelation of his attacker's occupation, and amid reports of intimidation by the Gambinos, Piecyk decided not to testify against Gotti, thanks to Boško Radonjić, the head of the Westies in Hell's Kitchen. When Gotti's trial began in March 1986, Piecyk testified he was unable to remember who had attacked him. The case was promptly dismissed, with the New York Post summarizing the proceedings with the headline: "I For Gotti!" It was later revealed that Gambino mobsters had severed Piecyk's brake lines, made threatening phone calls and stalked Piecyk before the trial.

On April 13, 1986, DeCicco was killed in a car bombing following a visit to Castellano loyalist James Failla. The bombing was carried out by Victor Amuso and Anthony "Gaspipe" Casso of the Lucchese family, under orders of Gigante and Lucchese boss Anthony Corallo, to avenge Castellano and Bilotti by killing their successors; Gotti also planned to visit Failla that day, but canceled, and the bomb was detonated after a soldier who rode with DeCicco was mistaken for the boss. Bombs had long been banned by the Mafia out of concern that it would put innocent people in harm's way, leading the Gambinos to initially suspect that "zips" — Sicilian mafiosi working in the U.S. — were behind it; zips were well-known for using bombs.

Following the bombing, Judge Eugene Nickerson, presiding over Gotti's racketeering trial, rescheduled to avoid a jury tainted by the resulting publicity, while Giacalone had Gotti's bail revoked due to evidence of witness intimidation in the Piecyk case. From jail, Gotti ordered the murder of DiBernardo by Gravano; both DiBernardo and Ruggiero had been vying to succeed DeCicco until Ruggiero accused DiBernardo of challenging Gotti's leadership. When Ruggiero, also under indictment, had his bail revoked for his abrasive behavior in preliminary hearings, a frustrated Gotti instead promoted Armone to underboss.

Jury selection for the racketeering case began again in August 1986, with Gotti standing trial alongside his ex-companion Johnson (who, despite being exposed as an informant, refused to turn state's evidence), Leonard DiMaria, Tony Rampino, Nicholas Corozzo and John Carneglia. At this point, the Gambino family were able to compromise the case when George Pape hid his friendship with Radonjić and was empaneled as Juror No. 11. Through Radonjić, Pape contacted Gravano and agreed to sell his vote on the jury for $60,000.

In the trial's opening statements on September 25, Gotti's defense attorney Bruce Cutler denied the existence of the Gambino family and framed the government's entire effort as a personal vendetta. His main strategy was to attack the credibility of Giacalone's witnesses by discussing the crimes they committed before turning state's evidence. During Gotti's defense, Cutler called bank robber Matthew Traynor, a would-be prosecution witness dropped for unreliability, who testified that Giacalone offered him drugs and her underwear as a masturbation aid in exchange for his testimony; Traynor's allegations would be dismissed by Judge Nickerson as "wholly unbelievable" after the trial, and he was subsequently convicted of perjury.

Despite Cutler's defense and critiques about the prosecution's performance, according to mob writers Jerry Capeci and Gene Mustain, when the jury's deliberations began, a majority were in favor of convicting Gotti. However, due to Pape's misconduct, Gotti knew from the beginning of the trial that he could do no worse than a hung jury. During deliberations, Pape held out for acquittal until the rest of the jury began to fear their own safety would be compromised. On March 13, 1987, they acquitted Gotti and his codefendants of all charges, including loansharking, illegal gambling, murder and truck hijackings. Five years later, Pape was convicted of obstruction of justice for his part in the fix, and sentenced to three years in prison.

In the face of previous Mafia convictions, particularly the success of the Mafia Commission Trial, Gotti's acquittal was a major upset that further added to his reputation. The American media dubbed him "The Teflon Don" in reference to the failure of any charges to "stick."

=== Reorganization ===
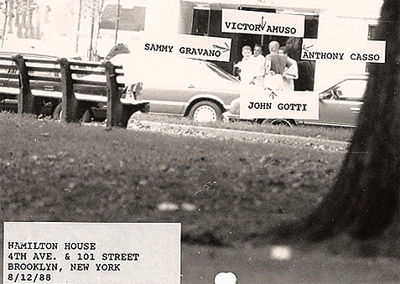
FBI surveillance photograph of Gotti, Gravano, Amuso and Casso

While Gotti had escaped conviction, his associates were not as fortunate. The other two men in the Gambino administration, underboss Armone and consigliere Gallo, had been indicted on racketeering charges in 1986, and were both convicted in December 1987. Ruggiero and Gene Gotti's heroin trial also commenced in June of that year.

Prior to their convictions, Gotti demoted Gallo, who retired to allow Gravano to take his place, while slating Frank LoCascio to serve as acting underboss in the event of Armone's imprisonment. The Gambino family also worked to compromise the heroin trial's jury, resulting in two mistrials. When the terminally ill Ruggiero was severed and released in 1989, Gotti refused to contact him, blaming him for the family's misfortunes. According to Gravano, Gotti also considered murdering Ruggiero, and when he finally died, said: "I literally had to drag him to the funeral."

Beginning in January 1988, Gotti, against Gravano's advice, required his captains to meet with him at the Ravenite Social Club once a week. Regarded by Gene as an unnecessary, vanity-inspired risk, and by FBI Gambino squad leader Bruce Mouw as antithetical to the "secret society", this move allowed FBI surveillance to record and identify much of the Gambino hierarchy. It also provided strong circumstantial evidence that Gotti was a boss; long-standing protocol in the Mafia requires public demonstrations of loyalty to the boss. The FBI also bugged the Ravenite, but failed to produce any high-quality incriminating recordings.

Later in 1988, Gotti, Gigante and new Lucchese boss Amuso attended the first Commission meeting since the Commission Trial, located at the LaBar Bat Club in Manhattan. Two years earlier, Casso had been injured in an unauthorized hit by Gambino captain Mickey Paradiso. In 1987, the FBI warned Gotti they had recorded Genovese consigliere Louis Manna discussing another hit on Gotti and his brother. In order to avoid a war, the leaders of the three families met, denied knowledge of their violence against one another and agreed to "communicate better". The bosses also agreed to allow Colombo acting boss Victor Orena to join the Commission, but Gigante, wary of giving Gotti a majority by admitting another ally, blocked the reentry of Massino and the Bonannos.

Gotti was also able to influence the New Jersey-based DeCavalcante crime family in 1988. According to DeCavalcante captain-turned-informant Anthony Rotondo, Gotti attended his father's wake with numerous other Gambino mobsters in a "show of force" and coerced boss Giovanni Riggi into agreeing to run his family on the Gambinos' behalf. The DeCavalcantes remained in the Gambino family's sphere of influence until Gotti's imprisonment.

Gotti's son, John Jr., was initiated into the Gambino family on Christmas Eve 1988. According to fellow mobster Michael DiLeonardo, initiated on the same night, Gravano held the ceremony to keep Gotti from being accused of nepotism. John Jr. was promptly promoted to captain.

In 1989, Gotti ordered the murder of real estate developer Fred Weiss out of concern that Weiss might become a government witness in exchange for leniency, ordering the DeCavalcante family to carry out the hit. Vincent "Vinny Ocean" Palermo and James "Jimmy" Gallo (unrelated to Joseph N. Gallo) shot Weiss in the face, killing him instantly, with Anthony Capo serving as their getaway driver. In 1990, Riggi appointed John D'Amato as acting boss of the DeCavalcante family when Riggi went to prison.

=== Assault acquittal ===
On the evening of January 23, 1989, Gotti was arrested outside the Ravenite and charged with ordering the 1986 assault of labor union official John O'Connor. In the back of the police car, he remarked, "Three to one I beat this charge." O'Connor, a leader in the United Brotherhood of Carpenters and Joiners of America (UBC) Local 608, who was later convicted of racketeering himself, was believed to have ordered an attack on a Gambino-associated restaurant that had snubbed the union and was subsequently shot and wounded by the Westies. After one night in jail, Gotti was released on $100,000 bail.

By this time, the FBI had cultivated new informants and learned that part of the reason the Ravenite bug failed was because Gotti would hold sensitive conversations elsewhere, either in a rear hallway in the building the club occupied, or in an apartment in its upper floors where the friendly widow of a Gambino soldier lived; by November 1989, both locations were bugged. The apartment bug was particularly fruitful due to Gotti's frankness as he discussed his criminal dealings in meetings there. In a December 12 conversation with LoCascio, Gotti plainly acknowledged ordering the murders of DiBernardo and Liborio Milito — the latter being one of Gravano's partners, killed for insubordination. He also announced his intent to kill soldier Louis DiBono, who had ignored a summons to meet with Gotti to discuss his mismanagement of a drywall business he held with Gotti and Gravano. The FBI, however, misheard the namedrop and failed to warn DiBono, who was killed on October 4, 1990. In another taped meeting on January 4, 1990, Gotti promoted Gravano to underboss, preferring him to lead the family if Gotti was convicted in the assault case.

State prosecutors linked Gotti to the assault case with a recording of him discussing O'Connor and announcing his intention to "bust him up", as well as the testimony of Westies gangster James McElroy. However, Gotti was acquitted of all six assault and conspiracy charges at trial on February 9, 1990. After the trial, there were firework displays by locals. Jules J. Bonavolonta, director of the FBI's organized crime division in New York, stated, "With all this media coverage he's beginning to look like a folk hero... What the public should realize is that he is the boss of the largest Cosa Nostra family, that he surrounds himself with ruthless killers and that he is flat out a criminal."

It later emerged that FBI bugs had apparently caught Gotti discussing plans to fix the jury as he had in the 1986–87 racketeering case. To the outrage of Manhattan district attorney Robert Morgenthau and state organized crime taskforce chief Ronald Goldstock, the FBI and federal prosecutors chose not to reveal this information to them. Morgenthau later said that had he known about these bugged conversations, he would have asked for a mistrial.

== 1992 conviction ==
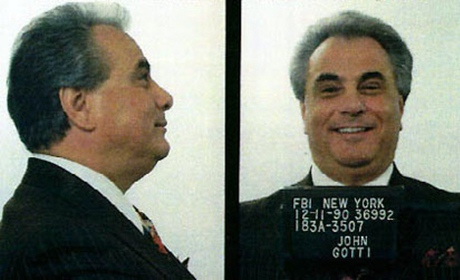
Mugshots of Gotti during his 1990 arrest

Gotti, Gravano and LoCascio were often recorded by the bugs placed throughout the Ravenite (concealed in the main room, the first-floor hallway and the upstairs apartment) discussing incriminating events. On December 11, 1990, FBI agents and NYPD detectives raided the Ravenite, arresting Gotti, Gravano and LoCascio. Federal prosecutors charged Gotti in this new racketeering case with five murders (Castellano, Bilotti, DiBernardo, Milito and, after review of the apartment tapes, DiBono), conspiracy to murder Gaetano Vastola, loansharking, illegal gambling, obstruction of justice, bribery and tax evasion.

Based on tapes from FBI bugs played at pretrial hearings, the Gambino administration was denied bail. At the same time, attorneys Cutler and Gerald Shargel were disqualified from defending Gotti and Gravano after prosecutors successfully contended they were "part of the evidence" and thus liable to be called as witnesses. Prosecutors argued that Cutler and Shargel not only knew about potential criminal activity, but had worked as "in-house counsel" for the Gambino family. Gotti subsequently hired Albert Krieger, a Miami attorney who had worked with Joseph Bonanno, to replace Cutler.

The tapes created a rift between Gotti and Gravano, where the Gambino boss described his newly appointed underboss as too greedy, and attempted to frame Gravano as the main force behind the murders of DiBernardo, Milito and DiBono. Gotti's attempt at reconciliation failed, leaving Gravano disillusioned with the mob and doubtful of his chances at winning his case without Shargel, his former attorney. He ultimately opted to turn state's evidence, formally agreeing to testify against Gotti on November 13, 1991. He was the highest-ranking member of a New York crime family to turn informer until Joseph Massino in 2003.

Gotti and LoCascio were tried in the U.S. District Court for the Eastern District of New York before District Judge I. Leo Glasser. Jury selection began in January 1992 with an anonymous jury that was, for the first time in a Brooklyn federal case, fully sequestered during the trial, due to Gotti's reputation for jury tampering. The trial commenced with the prosecution's opening statements on February 12; prosecutors Andrew Maloney and John Gleeson began their case by playing tapes showing Gotti discussing Gambino family business, including murders he approved, and confirming the animosity between Gotti and Castellano to establish the former's motive to kill his boss. After calling an eyewitness of the Castellano hit who identified Carneglia as one of the men who shot Bilotti, they then brought Gravano to testify on March 2.

On the stand, Gravano confirmed Gotti's place in the structure of the Gambino family and described in detail the conspiracy to assassinate Castellano, giving a full description of the hit and its aftermath. Gravano confessed to nineteen murders, implicating Gotti in four of them. Krieger, and LoCascio's attorney Anthony Cardinale, proved unable to shake Gravano during cross-examination. After additional testimony and tapes, the government rested its case on March 24.

Five of Krieger and Cardinale's intended six witnesses were ruled irrelevant or extraneous, leaving only Gotti's tax attorney Murray Appleman to testify on his behalf. The defense also attempted unsuccessfully to have a mistrial declared based on Maloney's closing remarks. Gotti himself became increasingly hostile during the trial, and at one point, Glasser threatened to remove him from the courtroom. Among other outbursts, Gotti called Gravano a junkie, while his attorneys sought to discuss his past steroid use, and equated the dismissal of a juror to the fixing of the 1919 World Series.

On April 2, 1992, after only fourteen hours of deliberation, the jury found Gotti guilty on all charges of the indictment (LoCascio was found guilty on all but one). James Fox, assistant director of the FBI's New York field office, announced at a press conference, "The Teflon is gone. The don is covered with Velcro, and all the charges stuck". On June 23, 1992, Glasser sentenced both defendants to life imprisonment without the possibility of parole, and fined them both $250,000 each. (Note: For his cooperation, Gravano was sentenced to five years' imprisonment, in 1994. However, since Gravano had already served four years, the sentence amounted to less than one year. After his release, he entered the Witness Protection Program, but left voluntarily in 1995.)

== Post-conviction ==
=== Incarceration ===
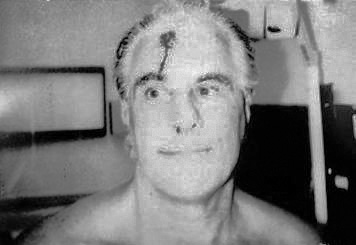
Photo of John Gotti after he was beaten by a fellow inmate in July 1996

Gotti was incarcerated at the United States Penitentiary at Marion, Illinois. He spent the majority of his sentence in effective solitary confinement, allowed out of his cell for only one hour a day. His final appeal was rejected by the United States Supreme Court in 1994.

On July 18, 1996, a fellow inmate named Walter Johnson punched Gotti in the prison recreation room, leaving him bruised and bleeding because, according to New York's Daily News, Gotti had disrespected him with a racial slur. Gotti, desiring revenge, offered Aryan Brotherhood chieftains David Sahakian and Michael McElhiney somewhere between $40,000 and $400,000 to have Johnson killed. In August, McElhiney told two Brotherhood underlings to kill Johnson "if given the opportunity”, according to a federal indictment charging him and thirty-nine other gang members with murder, attempted murder and racketeering. Johnson, however, was transferred to the supermax prison in Florence, Colorado.

Despite his imprisonment and pressure from the Commission to step down, Gotti asserted his prerogative to retain his title as boss until his death or retirement, with his brother Peter and his son John Jr. relaying orders on his behalf. By 1998, when he was indicted on racketeering, John Jr. was believed to be the acting boss of the family. Against his father's wishes, he pleaded guilty and was sentenced to six years and five months' imprisonment in 1999. He maintains that he has since left the Gambino family. Peter subsequently became acting boss, and is believed to have formally succeeded his brother shortly before Gotti's death.

John Jr.'s indictment brought further stress to Gotti's marriage. Victoria Gotti, up to that point unaware of her son's involvement in the Mafia, blamed her husband for ruining her son's life and threatened to leave him unless he allowed John Jr. to leave the mob.

=== Death and legacy ===
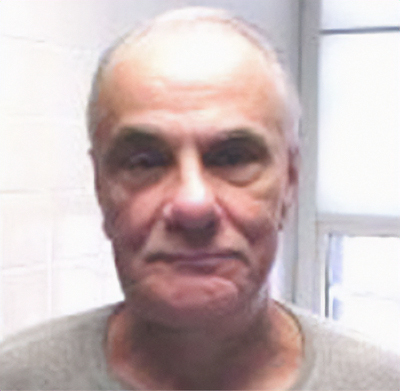
The last photo of John Gotti, age 60, taken by the Bureau of Prisons on October 17, 2001, eight months prior to his death

In 1998, Gotti was diagnosed with throat cancer and sent to the United States Medical Center for Federal Prisoners in Springfield, Missouri, for surgery. Though the tumor was removed, the cancer was discovered to have returned two years later, and Gotti was transferred back to Springfield, where he spent the rest of his life.

Gotti's condition rapidly declined, and he died on June 10, 2002, at the age of 61. The Catholic Diocese of Brooklyn announced that Gotti's family would not be permitted to have a Requiem Mass, but would be allowed to have a memorial Mass after the burial.

Gotti's funeral was held in a non-church facility. After the funeral, an estimated 300 onlookers followed the procession, which passed Gotti's Bergin Hunt and Fish Club, to the gravesite. His body was interred in a crypt next to his son, Frank. Gotti's brother Peter was unable to attend because of his incarceration.

In an apparent repudiation of Gotti's leadership and legacy, the other New York City families sent no representatives to the funeral. Numerous prosecutions triggered by Gotti's tactics left the Gambino family in shambles; by the turn of the century, half of the family's made men were in prison.

== In popular culture ==
Since his conviction, Gotti has been portrayed in six television films, three documentary series, three theatrical films and been a subject of lyrics in music.

=== Film and TV ===
- Getting Gotti – 1994 CBS TV movie, portrayed by Anthony John Denison
- Gotti – 1996 HBO TV movie, portrayed by Armand Assante
- Witness to the Mob – 1998 NBC miniseries, portrayed by Tom Sizemore
- A 1999 episode of the documentary series The FBI Files narrated the story of the investigation and conviction of Gotti.
- The Big Heist – 2001 Canadian-American TV movie which aired on A&E, portrayed by Steven Randazzo
- Boss of Bosses – 2001 TNT TV movie adapted from the book of the same name, portrayed by Sonny Marinelli
- Sinatra Club – 2010 theatrical film, portrayed by Danny Nucci
- The Wannabe – 2015 film, portrayed by Joseph Siravo
- The documentary series Mugshots aired an episode, "John Gotti: End of the Sicilians", in 2017. Filmed in Sicily and Brooklyn, the episode featured court wiretaps and undercover footage of Gotti's mob.
- Gotti – 2018 theatrical film, portrayed by John Travolta
- Victoria Gotti: My Father's Daughter is a 2019 television movie based on the book by Victoria Gotti. John Gotti is played by Maurice Benard.
- Get Gotti – 2023 Netflix documentary series.
- The Westies - 2026 television series portrayed by Hamish Allan-Headly.

Joey Zasa, a fictional character and an antagonist appearing in the theatrical film The Godfather Part III (1990), is partly based on John Gotti.

=== Music ===
- "Road to the Riches", a 1988 single by Kool G Rap & DJ Polo, makes a direct reference to John Gotti.
- In Fat Joe's 1993 debut single "Flow Joe", he raps, "Now in '93 they should free John Gotti".
- "Keep it Comin" by House of Pain on the Same As It Ever Was album 1994 they sing "Free John Gotti"
- In his 1994 debut album Ready to Die, the Notorious B.I.G. makes a reference to Gotti on the track named “Everyday Struggle.”
- "Gotti", a 1994 song by New Jersey rock band The Smithereens on their album A Date with The Smithereens. John Gotti is the subject of the song.
- Gotti is the key subject of the song "King of New York", by New York rap-rock group Fun Lovin' Criminals, released in 1996. The song reached number 28 in the UK singles chart and featured on the band's debut album Come Find Yourself, which achieved platinum status in the UK.
- In the 1996 song "D'Evils", Jay-Z states "I never prayed to God, I prayed to Gotti" to discuss his aspirations toward criminal success. Lupe Fiasco later referenced the lyric in his 2006 song "Hurt Me Soul".
- Gotti is mentioned in the song "Everybody Get Up", by British boy band Five, released in 1998.
- "Gangster John Gotti" is mentioned in the 1990 Tone Loc song "Can't Get Enough" from the Ford Fairlane soundtrack.
- Gotti is mentioned in the song "N 2 Gether Now", by Limp Bizkit and Method Man, released in 1999.
- "Who Da Neighbors" is a 2011 song by Juicy J and Lex Luger, in which Juicy J compares his rise from the projects and his development of expensive tastes to that of John Gotti.
- The 2013 song "Versace (Remix)", by Migos and Drake, references John Gotti as a notorious drug dealer.
- “Married To The Game”, a song by Future and DJ Esco on their 2016 mixtape Project E.T. refers to Gotti “I beat a couple cases, I feel like John Gotti”.
- "Teflon Don" is a 2021 song by rapper Rx Papi, named after one of Gotti's nicknames, references him throughout the song.
- Megan Thee Stallion refers to herself as the "Teflon Don" in her 2024 single "Hiss"
- In Future's 2024 mixtape MIXTAPE PLUTO, he references John Gotti's elusive criminal behaviour: "beat the first case like John Gotti". The title of the song nods at John Gotti more, being called "TEFLON DON".
- Gotti is mentioned in the song "Shiksa Goddess" from the musical The Last Five Years by Jason Robert Brown.
- Kevin Gates released a song called "John Gotti" in 2014.
- Rick Ross’s 2010 studio album is titled Teflon Don.
- Lil Durk mentions Gotti in his song “Who Is This”.
- EBK Leebo mentions Gotti in his song “7 Rings” featuring Bloodhound J Boogie, where he says “I can get on feet or send a blitz like I’m John Gotti”
- 6ix9ine featured a song titled "Gotti" on his 2018 mixtape Day69.

== Notes ==
American Mafia
Preceded by Paul Castellano	Gambino crime family Boss; 1985–2002	Succeeded by Peter "Petey Boy" Gotti
Preceded by Paul Castellano	Capo di tutti capi Boss of bosses 1985–2002	Succeeded by Joseph Massino
