= Richard V. Gotti =

American mobster (born 1942)

- Born: 1942 (age 83–84); The Bronx, New York, U.S.
- Occupation: Mobster
- Children: Richard G. Gotti
- Relatives: John Gotti (brother); Gene Gotti (brother); Peter Gotti (brother)

Richard V. Gotti (born 1942) is an American mobster in the Gambino crime family.

Gotti was born in the Bronx, New York, in 1942. He was one of 13 children (two had died at birth) of John Joseph Gotti Sr. and Philomena "Fannie" DeCarlo. Gotti's brothers included former Gambino boss John, capo Gene, former boss Peter, and Vincent Gotti. They grew up in East New York, Brooklyn. Gotti fathered a son, Richard G. Gotti, who followed him into organized crime.

By 1988, Gotti had become a made man, and by 1999 a caporegime.

On June 4, 2002, Gotti was indicted on racketeering and extortion charges, mainly involving Gambino crimes at an International Longshoremen's Association local and the attempted extortion of actor Steven Seagal. On March 17, 2003, Gotti was convicted of extortion and money laundering. Gotti was later sentenced to 16 years in federal prison. He was released from prison on August 12, 2005.
