= Gotti (2018 film) =

2018 film by Kevin Connolly

- Theatrical release poster
- Directed by: Kevin Connolly
- Written by: Lem Dobbs; Leo Rossi
- Produced by: Randall Emmett; George Furla; Michael Froch; Marc Fiore
- Starring: John Travolta; Spencer Lofranco; Pruitt Taylor Vince; Stacy Keach; Chris Mulkey; William DeMeo; Kelly Preston
- Cinematography: Michael Barrett
- Edited by: Jim Flynn
- Music by: Pitbull; Jorge Gómez; Jacob Bunton
- Production companies: Emmett Furla Oasis Films; Fiore Films, LLC; Ingenious
- Distributed by: SunRider Productions; Vertical Entertainment
- Release dates: May 15, 2018 (Cannes); June 15, 2018 (United States)
- Running time: 110 minutes
- Country: United States
- Language: English
- Budget: $10 million
- Box office: $6.4 million

Gotti is a 2018 American biographical crime film about New York City mobster John Gotti, directed by Kevin Connolly and written by Lem Dobbs and Leo Rossi. It stars John Travolta as Gotti, alongside his real-life wife Kelly Preston as Gotti's wife Victoria in her penultimate film.

The film was announced in 2010, but it languished in development for several years with numerous directors and actors, including Barry Levinson and Al Pacino. Principal photography finally began in July 2016 in Cincinnati, Ohio, and concluded in Brooklyn, New York in February 2017. The film was originally set to be released in the United States on December 15, 2017, but Lionsgate, the slated distributor, sold the film back to its producers and studio, delaying its release. On March 12, 2018, its eventual release date was announced by SunRider Productions and Vertical Entertainment, after premiering at the 2018 Cannes Film Festival.

Gotti was released on June 15, 2018 in the United States. The film was panned by critics who criticized its screenplay, performances, and historical inaccuracies, although Travolta's performance received minor praise. The film is considered to be one of the worst films ever made and holds a rare 0% rating on Rotten Tomatoes. In addition, the film was a commercial failure, grossing $6.4 million on a $10 million budget. At the 39th Golden Raspberry Awards, the film was nominated for six Razzies, including Worst Picture and Worst Actor for Travolta.

== Plot ==
In 1973, Gambino crime family underboss Aniello "Neil" Dellacroce tasks John Gotti, a young associate, with killing gangster James McBratney, who is believed to have kidnapped and murdered boss Carlo Gambino's nephew Emanuel. After executing McBratney at a bar, Gotti is identified as his killer in 1974 and sentenced to 4 years' imprisonment at Green Haven Correctional Facility the following year. Released on parole in 1977 after 2 years, he reunites with his wife Victoria and their children and becomes a "made man", immediately climbing the Mafia hierarchy to become a capo.

By 1979, Gotti operates out of the Bergin Hunt and Fish Club with his childhood friend Angelo Ruggiero. His oldest son John "Junior" Gotti enters the New York Military Academy, but aspires to join the Mafia. Despite Dellacroce's counsel and the assurances of fellow capo Frank DeCicco, Gotti mistrusts the Lucchese crime family's top underboss, Anthony Casso. On March 18, 1980, his 12-year-old middle son Frank is accidentally struck and killed by a car driven by John Favara, his next-door neighbor. Favara later disappears on July 28, and the only witness to his abduction, diner owner Leon Papon, is intimidated into silence.

With the Gambino family having come under increased scrutiny in 1985, Gotti becomes convinced that family boss Paul Castellano is too frail to lead effectively. Junior, meanwhile, instigates a bar brawl that causes a patron's death, infuriating his father. Federal authorities release incriminating tapes, caught on an FBI wiretap of Gambino family meetings, that reveal Gotti's involvement in labor racketeering. He escapes conviction when the case goes to trial, but prosecutor Diane Giacalone, assistant attorney for the Eastern District of New York, discloses that his close associate, Wilfred "Willy Boy" Johnson, has been a confidential informant for the FBI since 1966. Gotti agrees to reprieve Johnson for betraying the family, but does not object when Johnson is eventually murdered on August 29, 1988.

Suffering from brain cancer, Dellacroce informs Gotti of Castellano's plans to reorganize the Gambino family and disband Gotti's crew due to his insubordination and helps him secure the approval of the Five Families to eliminate Castellano, who fails to attend Dellacroce's funeral two days after his death on December 2. Castellano and his bodyguard Thomas Bilotti are gunned down outside Sparks Steak House in midtown Manhattan on December 16. Gotti subsequently takes over the Gambino family, becoming "the real-life Godfather". Rival boss Vincent "The Chin" Gigante of the Genovese crime family plots with Casso to eliminate him, and on April 13, 1986, DeCicco is killed by a car bomb that Ruggiero believes was meant for Gotti. Casso survives an unsanctioned hit, tracking down and torturing the hitman, James Hydell, into revealing he was sent by Ruggiero. Gotti reconciles with Gigante before excommunicating Ruggiero from the family to shield him from further retribution.

After escaping prosecution for the third time in 1987, Gotti is nicknamed "the Teflon Don". Junior is inducted into the Gambino family on Christmas Eve 1988 and marries his wife Kim in April 1990, while Ruggiero dies from terminal lung cancer in December 1989. On trial in 1992 for the fourth time, Gotti is charged with organizing Castellano's murder. Underboss Salvatore "Sammy the Bull" Gravano testifies against him, and this time, Gotti is convicted and sentenced to life imprisonment without parole. Junior assumes control as rivals target the organization and several family members are killed, and is himself taken into custody on January 21, 1998. On February 5, 1999, he visits his now-ailing father at the United States Medical Center for Federal Prisoners in Springfield, Missouri, to inform him that he is considering a plea bargain.

Following Gotti's death on June 10, 2002 from throat cancer, Junior chooses to abandon his criminal life for his own family's sake. After five trials, he is finally released from prison in December 2009.

== Cast ==
- John Travolta as John Gotti
- Spencer Lofranco as John "Junior" Gotti
- Kelly Preston as Victoria DiGiorgio Gotti
- Pruitt Taylor Vince as Angelo Ruggiero
- William DeMeo as Sammy Gravano
- Leo Rossi as Bartholomew Boriello
- Chris Kerson as Wilfred Johnson
- Stacy Keach as Neil Dellacroce
- Chris Mulkey as Frank DeCicco
- Sal Rendino as Vincent Gigante
- Nico Bustamante as Frankie Gotti
- Victor Gojcaj as Father Murphy
- Michael Cipiti as Carlo Gambino
- Donald John Volpenhein as Paul Castellano

== Production ==
=== Development history ===
In September 2010, Fiore Films announced that it had secured the rights from Gotti Jr. to produce a film about his life. The film, tentatively titled Gotti: In the Shadow of My Father, was to be directed by Barry Levinson, who eventually left the project. Nick Cassavetes and Joe Johnston were then also attached at different points to direct, as were Al Pacino, Lindsay Lohan, and Ben Foster to star in various roles. Joe Pesci was cast as Angelo Ruggiero early in development and gained 30 pounds in order to properly portray him. After having his salary cut and being recast as Lucchese underboss Anthony Casso, he sued Fiore Films for $3 million; the case was settled out of court. Chazz Palminteri, who had played Paul Castellano in the TNT made-for-TV film Boss of Bosses, was also initially cast to reprise Gotti's predecessor.

=== Casting ===
On September 8, 2015, it was announced that the project was moving forward with Kevin Connolly as director. Emmett/Furla/Oasis Films, Fiore Films and Herrick Entertainment would be financing the film, with Lionsgate Premiere handling the domestic distribution rights.

On July 27, 2016, the complete cast for the film was announced. It included Kelly Preston as Gotti's wife Victoria; Stacy Keach as Aniello Dellacroce, the underboss of the Gambino crime family who mentored Gotti; Pruitt Taylor Vince as Angelo Ruggiero, a deferential friend of Gotti; Spencer Lofranco as John Gotti Jr., Gotti's eldest son; William DeMeo as Sammy Gravano, Gotti's right-hand man who later became an FBI informant and helped them in bringing down Gotti; co-writer Leo Rossi as Bartholomew "Bobby" Boriello, Gotti's enforcer; Victor Gojcaj as Father Murphy, with Tyler Jon Olson and Megan Leonard.

=== Filming ===
Principal photography on the film began in Cincinnati, Ohio, on July 25, 2016, with locations including Springfield Township. The locations were staged to resemble the setting of the film, New York City. Filming also took place on Jonfred Court in Finneytown, and Indian Hill. Filming was also done at Butler County Jail.

The film's shooting was previously scheduled to take place in New York City, because of its setting there, but it was relocated to Cincinnati. One reason to relocate was Ohio's revised Motion Picture Tax Credit to benefit films' creators. Filming for some scenes took place in Brooklyn on February 21, 2017, which concluded principal photography.

== Release ==
The film was originally set to be released in a limited release and through video on demand on December 15, 2017, through Lionsgate Premiere. Producers began seeking a new distributor in order for the film to receive a wide theatrical release, as opposed to the original release it was initially intended to have, with Lionsgate selling the film back to the producers and studio. On March 12, 2018, Connolly announced that the film would be released on June 15, 2018. On April 12, 2018, it was announced Vertical Entertainment was the film's new distributor.

On April 25, 2018, it was announced that MoviePass Ventures, a subsidiary of MoviePass, acquired an equity stake in the film and will participate in the revenue generated from the film.

The film premiered at the 2018 Cannes Film Festival on May 15, 2018.

== Reception ==
=== Box office ===
Gotti grossed $4.3 million in the United States, and $1.8 million in other territories, for a worldwide total of $6.1 million, against a production budget of $10 million.

Gotti began its limited release in 503 theaters and was projected to make $1–2 million in its opening weekend. It made $105,000 from Thursday night previews at 350 theaters and a total of $1.7 million in its opening weekend, finishing 12th. According to their own reports, MoviePass accounted for 40% of tickets sold, leading one independent studio head to tell Deadline Hollywood: "It used to be in distribution, we'd all gossip whether a studio was buying tickets to their own movie to goose their opening. But in the case of MoviePass, there's no secret: They're literally buying the tickets to their own movie!" In its second weekend the film dropped 53% and made $812,000, finishing 12th.

=== Critical response ===
Gotti was not screened in advance for critics, but the Cannes premiere was attended by reviewers from IndieWire and The Hollywood Reporter, who both gave the film negative reviews. The film was panned by critics who criticized its screenplay, performances, and historical inaccuraces, although Travolta's performance received some praise. On the review aggregator website Rotten Tomatoes, it is one of the few films that has an approval rating of 0% based on 56 reviews, with an average rating of 2.1/10. The site's critical consensus simply reads, "Fuhgeddaboudit". On Metacritic, the film has a weighted average score of 24 out of 100, based on reviews from 16 critics, indicating "generally unfavorable" reviews.

Jordan Mintzer of The Hollywood Reporter gave the film a negative review, writing: "it's not only that the film is pretty terrible: poorly written, devoid of tension, ridiculous in spots and just plain dull in others. But the fact that it mostly portrays John Gotti as a loving family man and altogether likable guy, and his son John Gotti Jr. as a victim of government persecution, may be a first in the history of the genre." The New York Post's Johnny Oleksinski called the film "the worst mob movie of all-time" and wrote, "the long-awaited biopic about the Gambino crime boss' rise from made man to top dog, took four directors, 44 producers and eight years to make. It shows. The finished product belongs in a cement bucket at the bottom of the river." Writing for Rolling Stone, Peter Travers gave the film one out of four stars and said, "Insane testimonials from Gotti supporters at the end are as close as this [film] will ever get to good reviews."

Nick Schager, writing for The Daily Beast, said that the film "validates the oft-heard criticism that mob movies invariably glorify their subjects", adding: "The film does its best to make sure Gotti comes off as a noble and ruthless warrior-leader who ... was good for the community because he only killed his own and kept a lid on neighborhood crime." He concluded: "'Listen to me, and listen to me good. You never gonna see another guy like me if you live to be five thousand,' Travolta's Teflon Don boasts in the final scene. With any luck, we'll never see another mob-movie misfire like this either."

Richard Roeper of the Chicago Sun-Times was more positive in his review of the film, describing it as "an entertaining and well-acted but uneven B-movie."

=== Rotten Tomatoes rating discrepancy ===
Observers were quick to note a large disparity on Rotten Tomatoes, between the audience approval score of 80% and the 0% critics' score during the film's opening weekend. (Note: Attributed to multiple sources:) The audience score has since dropped 36 points to a score of 44%.

On June 19, Dan Murrell of Screen Junkies noted that the disparity "made no sense" and suspected vote manipulation on behalf of the studio. Accusations against the production studio and marketing team increased after the release of a marketing push suspected to be trying to hit back at the critics. The campaign proclaimed to consumers to ignore the "trolls behind a keyboard", and "Audiences loved Gotti but critics don't want you to see it ... The question is why??? Trust the people and see it for yourself!" (Note: Attributed to multiple sources:) Observers also noted the abnormally high number of reviews, 7000, compared to other films that did better at the box office that weekend, such as Incredibles 2 which logged 7600 reviews and grossed 105 times more than Gotti.

Rotten Tomatoes staff issued a statement stating they did not find any evidence of tampering and that "All of the ratings and reviews were left by active accounts." In June 2018, it was noted that 32 of the 54 written reviews were found to be from first-time reviewers on the site, who had also only left a review for Gotti itself, and 45 of the accounts were created the same month. Many of the accounts also wrote a review for the praised American Animals, which along with Gotti are the only films to be owned by MoviePass through its company MoviePass Ventures, which was responsible for 40% of tickets sold. Jim Vorel of Paste suggested this was done to try to prop up MoviePass's "unlimited movies" business model.

=== Accolades ===
Award	Category	Recipient(s)	Result	Ref.
Golden Raspberry Awards	Worst Picture	Randall Emmett, Marc Fiore, Michael Froch and George Furla	Nominated	
Golden Raspberry Awards	Worst Director	Kevin Connolly	Nominated	
Golden Raspberry Awards	Worst Actor	John Travolta	Nominated	
Golden Raspberry Awards	Worst Supporting Actress	Kelly Preston	Nominated	
Golden Raspberry Awards	Worst Screenplay	Lem Dobbs and Leo Rossi	Nominated	
Golden Raspberry Awards	Worst Screen Combo	Kelly Preston and John Travolta	Nominated	
Golden Schmoes Awards	Worst Movie of the Year		Nominated	

== See also ==
- List of films with a 0% rating on Rotten Tomatoes
