= 1982 in organized crime =

In 1982, a number of events took place in organized crime.

== Events ==
- Salvatore Lamberti, a Sicilian mafiosi, emigrates to the United States from Sicily.
- January 28 – The Federal Bureau of Investigation is granted concurrent jurisdiction by the office of the Attorney General in matters involving the Controlled Substances Act.
- February 26 – Chicago mobster Frank Renella is sentenced to seven years' imprisonment for violation of the Hobbs Act regarding extortion and jumping bail. Renella had previously been accused of involvement in the murder of local businessman Nick Velentzas, who had been threatened by Renella and his associates on numerous occasions regarding loansharking and protection payoffs.
- March 5 – Gambino crime family associates killed con artists Nicolina and Michael Lizak in retaliation for killing soldier Robert Russo.
- March 23 – Future pentito, Salvatore Contorno, is arrested in Rome where he had gone to prepare the killing of Giuseppe "Pippo" Calò, who Contorno held responsible for the murder of his boss Stefano Bontade. While in hiding from both the authorities and the Corleonesi, Contorno started to collaborate with the police. Police superintendent Antonino "Ninni" Cassarà used Contorno to create a map of the families of the Palermo region and a report on their increasingly conflictual relations and involvement in narcotics (the so-called Greco+161 report on July 13, 1982).
- April 30 – Sicily's Communist Party chief Pio La Torre and his driver Rosario Di Salvo are killed by the Mafia. La Torre had proposed an Anti-Mafia law that stipulated that being a member of the Mafia would be a specific criminal offence and enabled the seizure of properties of convicted mafiosi.
- May 1 – Carabinieri general Carlo Alberto Dalla Chiesa is appointed as prefect for Palermo to stop the violence of the Second Mafia War. He is killed the same year on September 3.
- May 6 – Salvatore Ruggiero, a heroin trafficker and brother of Gambino crime family capo Angelo Ruggiero, is killed in a plane crash.
- June 16 – In Sicily, Catania mafioso Alfio Ferlito is killed in an ambush when he was escorted by the Carabinieri during a transfer between to prisons. Three policemen are killed as well. The killers were from Palermo and linked to the Corleonesi, to please their ally Nitto Santapaola – the Mafia boss of Catania.
- June 18 – Italian banker Roberto Calvi was found dead, hanging from the Blackfriars Bridge in London. His death was initially thought to be a suicide. In 1997, Italian prosecutors in Rome implicated a member of the Sicilian Mafia, Giuseppe Calò, in Calvi's murder, along with Flavio Carboni, a Sardinian businessman with wide-ranging interests. Two other men, Ernesto Diotallevi (one of the leaders of the Banda della Magliana, a Roman Mafia-like organization) and former Mafia member turned informer Francesco Di Carlo, were also alleged to be involved in the killing. In July 1991 the Mafia pentito (a mafioso turned informer) Francesco Marino Mannoia claimed that Roberto Calvi had been killed because he had lost Mafia funds when the Banco Ambrosiano collapsed. According to Mannoia the killer was Francesco Di Carlo, a mafioso living in London at the time, and the order to kill Calvi had come from Mafia boss Giuseppe Calò and Licio Gelli, the head of the secret Italian masonic lodge Propaganda Due (P2). When Di Carlo became an informer in June 1996, he denied that he was the killer, but admitted that he had been approached by Calò to do the job. However, Di Carlo could not be reached in time, and when he later called Calò, the latter said that everything had been taken care of already. According to Di Carlo, the killers were Vincenzo Casillo and Sergio Vaccari, who belonged to the Camorra from Naples and have been killed since.
- July 13 – Police superintendent Antonino "Ninni" Cassarà releases his investigative report on the Sicilian Mafia, partly based on the revelations of Salvatore Contorno. Contorno's revelations were the first time the authorities really learned of Michele Greco's high-ranking membership of the Mafia. Previously he had just been regarded as a rather secretive landowner with a suspiciously high-income, although he did come from a long line of mafiosi. Working closely with judge Giovanni Falcone, the police two months later unleash a dragnet roundup of 162 mafiosi wanted for drug trafficking and homicide.
- July 20 – Cleveland Family boss James "Blackie" Licavoli is convicted under the Racketeer Influenced and Corrupt Organizations Act (RICO) of illegal gambling, murder for hire, and conspiracy charges by a U.S. District Court in Cleveland, Ohio and sentenced to 17 years imprisonment.
- August 11 – Vincenzo Sinagra, a Sicilian mafia associate of the sadistic Corso dei Mille Clan capo Filippo Marchese and witness to countless murders in the "Death Chamber of Piazza Sant'Erasmo" is arrested.
- August 17 – Nicodemo Scarfo's bail is revoked by a U.S. District Court in Camden, New Jersey due to a prior conviction for possession of firearms by a convicted felon. Although remaining in custody, Scarfo was retained control of the Philadelphia crime syndicate through underboss Salvatore "Chuckie" Merlino and consigliere Nicholas "Nicky Buck" Piccolo.
- August 23 – Alphonse "Little Al" D'Arco is initiated as an official member, a "made guy", of the Lucchese crime family.
- September 3 – Carabinieri general Carlo Alberto Dalla Chiesa is murdered by the Mafia in the Via Carini in Palermo. The hit team was sent from Catania by Nitto Santapaola, an ally of the Corleonesi, who paid back the service for the killing of his rival Alfio Ferlito by the Corleonesi on June 16. Dalla Chiesa had just been appointed prefect of Sicily to end the violence that was the result of the Second Mafia War between rival Mafia families. In his last public interview it had become clear that Dalla Chiesa started to focus on the emerging role of the Catania Mafia. Swapping hit teams proved to be a successful way to distract police investigations.
- September 11 – In a reaction to the murder of Carabinieri general Carlo Alberto Dalla Chiesa on September 3 and Communist politician Pio La Torre on April 30, the Italian parliament passes the La Torre-Rognoni Anti-Mafia Law. The law stipulated that being a member of the Mafia would be a specific criminal offence and was used by judge Giovanni Falcone to prosecute the Sicilian Mafia in the Maxi Trial that started in 1986. The law had been proposed by La Torre.
- October 14 – The Organized Crime Drug Enforcement Task Force (OCDETF) Program is officially formed.
- November 30 – Rosario Riccobono, the boss of Partanna Mondello, a suburb of Palermo, and eight of his men vanished without trace at the end of November 1982. Three of his associates were gunned down a few days later and his brother, Vito Riccobono, was found decapitated in his car. The Italian media blamed Tommaso Buscetta as being responsible for wiping out the Riccobono Family, as revenge for the slayings of Buscetta's two sons. In fact, Salvatore "Totò" Riina, Riccobono's supposed ally in the Second Mafia War, had ordered the slaughter of Riccobono and his associates and relatives because they were no longer of any use by the time the Mafia War was ending with the victory of Riina and the Corleonesi. A number of informants have said that Pino Greco was the man who garrotted Riccobono and orchestrated the murders of a dozen of Riccobono's associates and relatives.
- December – Joey "The Clown" Lombardo is arrested and later convicted of attempting to bribe Nevada Senator Howard Cannon.
- December 6 – After an extensive investigation by the Denver Division, Denver crime family boss Eugene "Checkers" Smaldone, along with his underboss brother, Clarence "Chauncey" Smaldone and consigliere Paul "Fat Paul" Villano, is convicted for extortionate credit transactions, tax evasion, and conspiracy and sentenced to 10 year imprisonment.
- December 15 – Chicago insurance executive Allen M. Dorfman, reportedly associated with organized crime figures through the International Brotherhood of Teamsters (IBT) Union, is convicted of attempted bribery by a U.S. District Court in Chicago, Illinois. Dorfman's conviction concludes the investigation regarding the attempted bribery of Nevada Senator Howard Cannon, in regard to trucking industry deregulation.
- Sometime around the end of 1982, Sicilian mafioso Filippo Marchese is killed. He was in charge of what became known as the Room Of Death, a small apartment along the Piazza Sant Erasmo road. Victims who stood in the way of the Corleonesi of Totò Riina during the Second Mafia War were lured there to be murdered, usually by being garrotted. Their bodies were either dissolved in acid or chopped up and dumped out at sea. Marchese was also garrotted and dissolved in acid like so many of his own victims. He was so elusive that the authorities did not learn of his death until the late 1980s through an informant.

== Deaths ==
- May 6 – Salvatore Ruggiero, heroin trafficker and brother of Gambino crime family capo Angelo "Quack Quack" Ruggiero
- June 5 – John J. Vitale, boss and underboss of the St. Louis crime family
- June 17 – Roberto Calvi, banker and money launderer for the Sicilian Cosa Nostra
- September 3 – Carlo Alberto Dalla Chiesa, Italian carabinieri general
- Filippo Marchese, Sicilian mafioso, hitman and capo of Corso di Mille Clan
- Anthony Biunno "Tony the Butcher", Italian-American mobster
