= Green Haven Correctional Facility =

Maximum-security prison in Beekman, New York

- Interactive map of Green Haven Correctional Facility
- Location: Town of Beekman, Dutchess County, New York, United States; 41°34′49″N 73°43′00″W
- Status: Operational
- Security class: Maximum
- Capacity: 2170
- Opened: 1949
- Managed by: New York State Department of Corrections and Community Supervision

Green Haven Correctional Facility is a maximum security prison in New York, United States. The prison is located in the Town of Beekman in Dutchess County. The New York State Department of Corrections and Community Supervision lists the address as Route 216, Stormville, New York 12582. This prison housed New York's execution chamber during the time the state briefly had the death penalty (but never used it) in the post-Furman era. It was originally a federal prison and now houses maximum security inmates. Green Haven Correctional Facility also operated a Hot Kosher Foods Program; but no longer does as of 2020. However, because of this, the prison had a large Jewish population. Yale Law School operates the Green Haven Prison Project, a series of seminars among Yale law students and Green Haven inmates on law and policy issues concerning prisons and criminal law.

== Notable inmates ==
- Francisco Acevedo, serial killer who murdered three women in New York between 1989 and 1996.
- Andre Rand, thought to be the notorious madman "Cropsy" in Staten Island, New York. He was convicted of the kidnapping of 12-year-old Jennifer Schweiger in 1987 and the kidnapping of Holly Ann Hughes (a case 23 years old) in 2004.
- Charles Luciano, known as Lucky Luciano, founded the modern Cosa Nostra. He spent a brief period here in 1936 before his deportation to Italy.
- Arthur Shawcross, an American serial killer who served 15 years in Green Haven from 1972 to 1987.
- Ronald DeFeo Jr., tried for and convicted of killing his parents and four siblings at their home in Amityville, New York. The case inspired Jay Anson's novel The Amityville Horror.
- James McBratney, a convicted bank robber who kidnapped Emanuel Gambino, the son of Thomas Gambino and nephew of Gambino crime family patriarch Carlo Gambino. He was murdered by John Gotti, Angelo Ruggiero and Ralph Galione in a highly publicized mob execution.
- Robert Golub, convicted for the murder of 13-year-old Kelly Anne Tinyes, who lived five doors away from his home. She was killed inside his home in Valley Stream, New York, on March 3, 1989. On March 3, 2009, this case was reopened.
- John Giuca, whose trial has been the subject of intense media attention following his mother's undercover operation to expose juror misconduct.
- Lemuel Warren Smith, is an American serial killer who was the first convict to kill an on-duty female corrections officer. Smith was already in prison for the murders of at least five people when he murdered prison guard Donna Payant at Green Haven Correctional Facility in 1981.
- John Gotti (1940–2002), an American mobster who became the boss of the Gambino crime family in New York City. Gotti and his brothers grew up in poverty and turned to a life of crime at an early age. Operating out of the Ozone Park neighborhood of Queens, Gotti quickly rose to prominence, becoming one of the crime family's biggest earners and a protégé of Gambino family underboss Aniello Dellacroce.
- Nicky Barnes, an American former criminal drug lord and crime boss.
- Joey Gallo (1929–1972), also known as "Crazy Joe" and "Joe the Blond", a celebrated New York City gangster for the Profaci crime family, later known as the Colombo crime family. Gallo initiated one of the bloodiest mob conflicts since the 1931 Castellammarese War and was murdered as a result of it.
- Daniel Genis, journalist and writer, spent three years in Green Haven and often writes about it.
- Calvin Jackson, serial killer who murdered nine women in Manhattan between 1973 and 1974.
- Willie Sutton, a bank robber who escaped from this prison in the 1940s.
- Mark David Chapman, the man who murdered John Lennon in 1980. Chapman was transferred from Wende Correctional Facility to Green Haven in 2022.
- Riccardo McCray, perpetrator of the 2010 City Grill shooting.
- Waldo Grant, a serial killer who murdered four gay men in Manhattan between 1973 and 1976.
- Thang Thanh Nguyen, formerly listed on the FBI Ten Most Wanted Fugitives list. Convicted of murder for the 1992 robbery and killing of Chung Lam in Irondequoit, New York.
- Matthew Madonna, an American mobster and member of the Lucchese crime family. He previously served as acting boss before being imprisoned in 2017.

== Correction officer deaths ==
There have been at least two deaths of correction officers in the line of duty.

The first was of Donna Payant on May 15, 1981, who disappeared while working at the prison. Her body was later found in a garbage dump 20 miles away, sexually violated and strangled, similar to the bodies of victims of serial killer Lemuel Smith, an inmate at the prison. A bite mark on Payant's chest also matched Smith's tooth pattern. It was determined that Smith had sexually assaulted and strangled Payant in the prison chaplain's office before putting her body in a trash bag and throwing it out with the trash.

On January 31, 2007, a correction officer in Tower One was found dead due to an apparent gunshot wound to the head. Fire and police were dispatched around 10:30 p.m.; when they found the hatch to the ladder blocked, they used a Beekman Fire Department ladder truck to break in and get access. The tower was closed for investigation, and the death was deemed a suicide.

== Previous death house facility ==
In the early 1970s, New York's electric chair "Old Sparky" was moved here from Sing Sing Correctional Facility. Capital punishment was reinstated in New York in 1995 when Governor George Pataki signed a new statute into law, which provided for execution by lethal injection. On June 24, 2004, in the case People v. LaValle, the New York Court of Appeals struck down the statute as unconstitutional under the New York Constitution (at the time, only two individuals were under a sentence of death). Although seven individuals were sentenced to death, no one was executed, and the Court of Appeals later commuted the sentence of the final individual under a sentence of death in New York on October 23, 2007, in the case People v. John Taylor. In July 2008, Governor David Paterson ordered the removal of all execution equipment used to perform lethal injection and the closure of the execution chamber at the Green Haven Correctional Facility.

== Inmate resources and services ==
Inmates at Green Haven Correctional Facility can get jobs through the NYSDOCCS Correctional industries. The jobs they can be assigned to include working in an upholstery shop, as well as furniture manufacturing. Inmates incarcerated at this facility can also receive vocational training, such as barbering, building maintenance, culinary arts, carpentry, computer operator, computer repair, custodial maintenance, electrical, painting and decorating, printing, and auto technology. Inmates may also earn GEDs or college credits. Prisoners also receive counseling as well as drug and alcohol treatment.

The Alternatives to Violence Project was conceived at the prison in 1975 as a workshop.

The Bard Prison Initiative, which seeks to reduce rates of recidivism and offer prisoners college education and tutoring, operates at multiple prisons including Green Haven.

== In the media ==
Inmates and correctional officers at Green Haven were featured in the 1985 PBS Frontline program A Class Divided. The Facility is made reference to in the 1993 film Carlito's Way. It is also featured in the Law & Order: Special Victims Unit season 17 episode "Nationwide Manhunt" which features an elaborate prison break.
