= Wilfred Johnson =

American mobster (1935–1988)

- Johnson's December 1972 NYPD mugshot
- Born: September 29, 1935; New York City, U.S.
- Died: August 29, 1988 (aged 52); New York City, U.S.
- Cause of death: Gunshot wounds
- Resting place: St. John Cemetery
- Other names: "Willie Boy", "Indian", "Wahoo"
- Occupation: Mobster
- Allegiance: Gambino crime family

Wilfred "Willie Boy" Johnson (September 29, 1935 – August 29, 1988) was a reputed American mobster. According to court documents and pretrial testimony, Johnson was a Federal Bureau of Investigation (FBI) informant from 1966 to 1985, when he provided investigators with information relating to John Gotti and other members of the Gambino crime family. However, Johnson and his attorneys publicly disputed claims that he ever cooperated with investigators. Johnson was shot and killed as he walked to his car in Brooklyn.

== Early life ==
Johnson had four siblings, raised in Canarsie, Brooklyn. His father John Johnson was part Native American and was an International Association of Bridge, Structural, Ornamental and Reinforcing Iron Workers construction worker. Wilfred's mother was an Italian-American housewife. His parents had settled in Red Hook, Brooklyn, where Wilfred Johnson was raised with his brothers and sisters.

Johnson's criminal career began when he was only nine years old, when he was arrested for stealing money out of a cash register at Helen's Candy Store, which was a Murder, Inc. mob hangout. At age 12, Johnson either fell or was pushed off the school roof during a fight. As a result of this accident, Johnson sustained head injuries that would plague him with persistent headaches for the rest of his life. Before entering the criminal life, he worked as an International Union of Operating Engineers crane operator.

== Criminal career ==
=== Entry into organized crime ===
As a young man, Johnson was physically imposing. Allan May, quoting from the memoir of Retired NYPD Lieutenant Remo Franceschini of the Queens District Attorney's Squad, describes Johnson thus:

He was real stocky, about five feet nine inches and well over two hundred pounds, looked like a professional wrestler. Size twenty-one neck, gravel voice. You didn't want to meet Willie Boy on the street, and if you met him you'd better have backup ammunition in your pocket because six bullets were not going to stop this guy. He was the type of guy who, if he got shot, he would almost try to rip the bullets out of his own chest and then get really pissed off. 'You shot me? Now you're in f—kin' trouble.'

This led Johnson to become a Mafia enforcer. By 1949, he was running a gang of thugs in East New York who strong-armed debtors into paying their mob debts. In 1957, Johnson met John Gotti for the first time. Gotti was a 17-year-old high school dropout and Johnson was a street thug perpetually in trouble with the law.

When Gotti joined the Gambino family, Johnson came with him. Johnson became known as the "terminator" because of his skill with strong-arm work. Requiring a steady income, Johnson was given a modestly successful gambling operation. Because Johnson was only half-Italian from the wrong side of the family, he could never become a made man. However, he brought in money as well as anyone else in the family.

=== Cooperation with the FBI ===
The FBI's codename for Johnson was "Wahoo" because of his Native American heritage.

In 1966, Johnson purportedly turned against the Gambino family, when he was imprisoned for armed robbery. His caporegime, Carmine Fatico, vowed to financially support Johnson's wife and two infant children but soon broke this promise. Johnson's wife, who remained loyal to Johnson throughout all his prison terms, was forced to go on welfare.

Johnson rarely volunteered information but would answer direct questions asked by law enforcement officials. His FBI handler, Special Agent Martin Boland, would submit questions from various organized crime squads inside the FBI and the Drug Enforcement Administration (DEA).

In 1967, during an FBI interview, someone spotted Johnson's apparent dissatisfaction with the mob. After his release from prison, the FBI approached him about becoming an informant. Reluctant at first, Johnson finally agreed to talk in return for the government's dropping some counterfeiting charges. Johnson also wanted to pay back the Gambinos for their dishonesty. In 1978, Johnson informed Boland about the whereabouts of Lucchese crime family capo, Paul Vario's, hijacking headquarters, which at the time was operating out of a scrapyard owned by Clyde Brooks.

Although he was an informant, Johnson customarily was careful about discussing his friend John Gotti. Johnson had a curious relationship with Gotti, and at one point remarked to Boland, "Sometimes I love him, and sometimes I hate him". Johnson did not provide much elaboration except for occasional hints, among them complaints about Gotti's gambling addiction, which often involved, Johnson said, bets of up to $100,000 a week. Some of that action, Johnson complained, would be laid off at his modest bookmaking operation, forcing Johnson to absorb the loss. On other occasions, Johnson would say bitterly about Gotti, "You know, he wears these expensive suits now, but he's still a lot of bullshit; he's still a mutt. Don't be fooled by that smooth exterior".

Underlying Johnson's bitterness was apparent resentment over his continuing lowly status in Carmine Fatico's crew, a state of permanent inferiority, despite Johnson's loyal service. Johnson resented how Fatico and Gotti always treated him like a peon: "They still see me as a gofer and make me handle swag".

Except for $100 Johnson once borrowed from Boland as an "emergency personal loan" which was promptly paid back and on which Boland declined an offer of "vig", Johnson did not receive any financial compensation from the FBI. He did, however, make some profit; his information solved a number of major hijackings for the FBI, and in cases where insurance companies offered large rewards for recovery of stolen goods, the FBI provided confidential affidavits attesting that Johnson was directly responsible for recovery of hijacked goods. Johnson collected the rewards, in one case $30,000 for the recovery of a large shipment. As an informant, Johnson did not seek intervention by the FBI to get criminal charges reduced or dropped, aside from the aforementioned counterfeiting charges.

=== Career as informant ===
During his 16 years as an informant until 1985, Johnson provided information on all the different New York Mafia crews that he worked with, and the FBI used that information to make many arrests. However, as his FBI handler, Special Agent Martin Boland, noticed, Johnson refused to discuss his background or childhood in any detail.

One of the most significant pieces of information provided by Johnson was how the Vario crew was avoiding FBI wiretaps and bugs. The crew was using a parked trailer in a junkyard owned by Paul Vario in Brooklyn.

Johnson also provided the FBI with information on a largescale narcotics ring, run by John Gotti and others, called the "Pleasant Avenue Connection", revealed that Gotti and Angelo Ruggiero had murdered Florida mobster Anthony Plate, and gave details on the murder of James McBratney, the man who kidnapped Emanuel Gambino.

=== Exposure ===
In 1985, Johnson's career as an informant came to an abrupt end. In a public hearing that year, federal prosecutor Diane Giacalone revealed that Johnson was working for the FBI, in an attempt to convince him to plea bargain and testify against Gotti. Johnson's FBI handlers tried to convince him to enter the Witness Protection Program, but he refused, and publicly denied being an informant. This led to a breakdown in already strained relations between the FBI and Giacalone and led the FBI to cease involvement in the Gotti case.

== Murder ==
On August 29, 1988, Bonanno family hit men Thomas Pitera and Vincent "Kojak" Giattino allegedly ambushed Johnson in front of his Brooklyn home as he walked to his car and shot him to death. The gunmen fired 19 rounds at him. Johnson was hit once in each thigh, twice in the back, and at least six times in the head. The hit team then dropped jack-like caltrops on the street to prevent the possibility of pursuit. Pitera had allegedly done this as a favor to Gotti.

In 1991, Pitera had accused Johnson of the 1980 murder of John Favara, the man who accidentally struck and killed Gotti’s 12-year-old son with his car.

In 1992, Pitera and Giattino were indicted and tried for Johnson's murder. Giattino was found guilty. Pitera was acquitted, but was later convicted of six other murders.

Johnson is interred at St. John Cemetery in Middle Village, Queens, New York.
