= Francisco Acevedo =

American serial killer (born 1968)

- Born: Francisco Acevedo; September 2, 1968 (age 58); Meriden, Connecticut, U.S.
- Conviction: Second degree murder (3 counts)
- Penalty: 75 years to life in prison

Details
- Victims: 3
- Span of crimes: 1989–1996
- Country: United States
- State: New York
- Date apprehended: April 21, 2010

Francisco Acevedo (born September 2, 1968) is an American serial killer who was convicted of strangling three women to death in New York between 1989 and 1996. Acevedo was linked to the murders in 2009 after voluntarily giving his DNA as a parole condition for drunk driving. In 2012, he was sentenced to 75 years to life imprisonment.

== Early life ==
Francisco Acevedo was born in Meriden, Connecticut, on September 2, 1968, one of three children to Yadira Acevedo. His parents divorced when he was 14 years old, after which he moved in with his father. According to court records, he abused alcohol, marijuana, and cocaine at the age of 12.

Acevedo dropped out of high school during his freshman year and worked a series of jobs, including as a laborer, a cook at a pizzeria, a dishwasher at Testa's Silvertown Inn, and a midnight baker at Dunkin' Donuts.

In the 1990s, he was living in Mount Vernon, New York. He met his wife while working at New Way Kitchen, with whom he would have two sons.

== Crimes and trial ==
On July 3, 1986, three years before his first known murder, Acevedo picked up a woman in his company truck in Meriden and drove her to a secluded area, where he bound her hands, blindfolded, and sexually assaulted her. The woman fled after he fell asleep, and he was arrested and sentenced to ten years in prison. He was released in June 1988.

On November 11, 1997, he was charged with third degree assault on his wife in Yonkers; however, the charge was later dismissed. On August 30, 1998, he was arrested again for breaking his wife's nose after punching her in the face. He was convicted of a misdemeanor and served nine months in jail.

Acevedo was arrested in Brentwood on January 26, 2009, his fourth time for drunk driving. While in prison, he gave a sample of his DNA as part of an optional parole application. His DNA was linked to evidence from three decade-old murder victims:

- Maria Ramos of the Bronx, murdered on February 5, 1989, aged 26
- Tawanda Hodges of the Bronx, murdered on March 28, 1991, aged 28
- Kimberly Moore of Greenburgh, murdered on May 24, 1996, aged 30

Each victim was found naked and beaten, and were posed after their deaths. Investigators were aware of the murders being connected due to matching DNA found on each victim. However, they had no suspect whose DNA matched prior to Acevedo's arrest.

Acevedo maintained his innocence, claiming that he had sexual intercourse with the victims but had no involvement in their murders. He was acquitted of three counts of rape, as the victims were known sex workers. He was found guilty of the murders on the first day of jury deliberations and was sentenced three times to 25 years to life imprisonment, each to be served consecutively, totaling to a minimum of 75 years. He is currently incarcerated at Green Haven Correctional Facility.

== See also ==
- List of serial killers in the United States
