= The Forger (2014 film) =

2014 film by Philip Martin

- Theatrical release poster
- Directed by: Philip Martin
- Written by: Richard D'Ovidio
- Produced by: Rob Carliner; Al Corley; Eugene Musso; Bart Rosenblatt; Gordon Bijelonic
- Starring: John Travolta; Christopher Plummer; Tye Sheridan; Abigail Spencer; Marcus Thomas; Anson Mount; Jennifer Ehle
- Cinematography: John Bailey
- Edited by: Peter Boyle
- Production companies: Code Entertainment; Solution Entertainment Group
- Distributed by: Saban Films
- Release dates: September 12, 2014 (TIFF); April 24, 2015 (United States)
- Running time: 92 minutes
- Country: United States
- Language: English
- Budget: $11 million
- Box office: $16 million

The Forger is a 2014 American thriller drama film directed by Philip Martin and starring John Travolta. It started filming in October 2013. It was released to theaters on April 24, 2015.

== Plot ==
Raymond Cutter, a second-generation criminal, cuts a deal with an underworld art dealer to get released early from prison to spend time with his son who has an inoperable brain tumor. He must forge a copy of Monet's Woman with a Parasol - Madame Monet and Her Son (in the National Gallery of Art, Washington, D.C.) and switch it with the real one, with the help of his son and father, to repay the syndicate that arranged his release.

== Cast ==
- John Travolta as Raymond J. Cutter
- Christopher Plummer as Joseph Cutter
- Tye Sheridan as Will Cutter
- Anson Mount as Keegan
- Jennifer Ehle as Kim Cutter
- Abigail Spencer as Agent Paisley
- Marcus Thomas as Carl
- Travis Aaron Wade as Detective Devlin
- Lyndon Smith as Melanie
- Victor Gojcaj as Dimitri

== Release and reception ==
=== Distribution ===
The Forger premiered at the Toronto International Film Festival on September 12, 2014. Prior to, Saban Films acquired U.S. distribution rights for over $2 million, beating studios including A24 and The Weinstein Company.

=== Critical response ===
The Forger was panned by critics and audiences alike. On Rotten Tomatoes, the film holds a 9% rating, with an average score of 4.2/10, based on 44 reviews. The consensus reads, "So rote that its star is overshadowed by his wig, The Forger offers nary a thrill nor a scintilla of suspense that couldn't be overpowered by a decent basic-cable drama." On Metacritic, the film has a score of 32 out of 100, indicating "generally unfavorable reviews", based on 16 reviews from critics. IGN awarded it a score of 4.5 out of 10, saying "The Forger, starring John Travolta, goes through the motions, but isn't the real deal."
