= Lemuel Smith =

American serial killer (born 1941)

Lemuel Warren Smith
- Born: Lemuel Warren Smith; July 23, 1941 (age 85); Amsterdam, New York, U.S.
- Convictions: First degree murder; Second degree murder (2 counts); Assault with intent to kill; First degree attempted rape; Second degree kidnapping
- Penalty: Death; commuted to life imprisonment

Details
- Victims: 6
- Span of crimes: January 21, 1958 – May 15, 1981
- Country: United States
- State: New York
- Date apprehended: August 19, 1977

Lemuel Warren Smith (born July 23, 1941) is an American convicted serial killer who was the first convict to kill an on-duty female corrections officer. Smith was already in prison for the murders of at least five people when he murdered prison guard Donna Payant at Green Haven Correctional Facility in 1981.

The murder of a guard in a maximum security prison was considered shocking at the time and brought scrutiny upon the New York prison systems. Smith is considered one of the most dangerous living inmates in the New York prison system and is housed in 23-hour-a-day isolation from other people.

Smith has admitted his guilt in all of his cases, with the sole exception of Donna Payant's murder. He maintains that he was framed in this case and that fellow prison guards murdered her to prevent her from revealing corruption in the prison system.

== Early life ==
Lemuel Smith was born in Amsterdam, New York, in a very religious household. During later insanity claims, Smith stated that when he was 11 years old, he nearly smothered a nine-year-old girl to death. This claim was not substantiated, however.

On January 21, 1958, Dorothy Waterstreet was robbed and beaten to death near Smith's neighborhood in Amsterdam, New York. Evidence pointed towards the 16-year-old Smith, but the case fell apart when the district attorney was too hasty in trying to extract a confession, and Smith was not arrested.

== Prison time ==
During the following summer, while under continuing pressure from Amsterdam police, Smith relocated to Baltimore, Maryland, where he kidnapped a 25-year-old woman and beat her nearly to death. This time, a witness interrupted the crime and Smith left a living victim. He was quickly arrested, and on April 12, 1959, was sentenced to 20 years in prison for assault with intent to murder.

After nearly 10 years in custody, Smith was paroled in May 1968 and he moved back to the Capital District. On May 20, 1969, he kidnapped and sexually assaulted a woman who managed to escape, due to the heroism of Anthony Scipione and his wife, Kathleen. Later that same day, he kidnapped and raped a 46-year-old friend of his mother's. When the woman convinced Smith to let her go, he was arrested again and eventually sentenced to 4–15 years in a New York prison.

== Freedom and serial murders ==
Smith was paroled from prison in October 1976 after having served a little more than four years incarceration after having pleaded guilty to first-degree attempted rape. A little more than a month after Smith's release, on November 24, 1976, the day before Thanksgiving, Robert Hedderman, 48, and Hedderman's secretary, Margaret Byron, 59, were found brutally murdered in the back of Hedderman's religious store in Albany. Human feces was found on evidence nearby, which later proved valuable. Smith was free and employed nearby and hair and blood evidence made him a main suspect.

On December 23, 1976, while Albany police were investigating the double murder, Joan Richburg, 24, was raped, murdered and mutilated in her car at Colonie Center mall in Colonie. The pattern of brutality and more hair evidence made Smith the prime suspect in that murder as well, but he remained free pending investigation.

Barely two weeks later, on January 10, 1977, a large man tried to lure a 22-year-old woman out of a gift shop in Albany. When she resisted, he took her 60-year-old grandmother hostage and threatened to kill her. When help arrived, he threw the woman down, knocking her unconscious and deliberately stepped on her hand, breaking it. Years later the grandmother saw a picture of Smith in the newspaper and identified him as having been her attacker.

With the three murder investigations stalled, on July 22, 1977, Maralie Wilson, 30, was found strangled and mutilated near train tracks in downtown Schenectady, New York. The horrendous post-mortem mutilation was worse than some veteran investigators had ever seen in the region. Smith was known to frequent the area and witnesses recalled Wilson being accosted by a large man. Schenectady police made Smith the prime suspect in her murder.

On August 19, 1977, Marianne Maggio, 18, who worked in the same area as Wilson, was kidnapped and raped by Smith. When he forced her to drive towards Albany afterwards, police stopped the car and arrested Smith without incident.

== Experiment and confessions ==
A short time after Smith's last days as a free man, New York State Police Lt. Don Pinto, looked at photographs of Maralie Wilson and noticed that a mark on her nose might be a bite mark. Wilson's body was exhumed and the bite mark was positively matched to an imprint of Lemuel Smith's bite pattern.

Around the same time, in late October 1977, Smith was transported by police to Bleecker Stadium in Albany. He and four other men were randomly placed behind five screens at one end of the stadium. At the other end of the stadium, a police dog was given the scent of the feces-stained clothing from the Hedderman store murders eleven months prior. The dog crossed the entire stadium directly to Smith. Out of sight of the dog, the five men were randomly rearranged and the experiment was repeated with the same result. It was successful a third time as well.

On March 5, 1978, with the bite mark match, Smith confessed to five murders in an attempt to convince prosecutors of his insanity, including the murder of Dorothy Waterstreet nearly twenty years earlier. The confession was given under the condition it be kept secret, however police were permitted to follow leads provided by the detailed confession.

== Insanity defense ==
Along with his confessions, Smith revealed disturbing secrets about lifelong mental problems, including a claim that he suffered from multiple personality disorder. He attested to being controlled by the spirit of his deceased brother, John Jr., who had died from encephalitis as an infant before Smith was born. One counselor said that other personalities besides John Jr. might exist inside Smith. They also determined that he had suffered multiple head injuries as a child and teenager, and that he had suffered further mental abuse as a result of overzealous religious convictions, especially from his father.

Originally, Smith's lawyers and doctors feared he might not be fit to stand trial. When it was determined to go ahead with the initial rape and kidnapping trials, two doctors testified to his delusions, but stopped short of saying he was criminally insane. Smith was found guilty of rape in Saratoga County and, on March 9, 1978, he was sentenced to ten to twenty years in prison. On July 21, 1978, a four-day bench trial in Schenectady ended with Smith being found guilty of kidnapping, and he was sentenced to another twenty-five years to life. Soon after, Smith unsuccessfully attempted suicide.

In Albany, Smith was indicted for the Hedderman store double murder. He was found guilty on February 2, 1979, and sentenced to another fifty years to life.

When the bite mark evidence was presented in the Wilson murder case, Smith was indicted for her murder. He was also indicted for the murder of Joan Richburg after confessing. Since there was already no chance of him ever leaving prison, the indictments were dismissed.

== Prison murder ==
In 1981, Smith was in the maximum-security Green Haven Correctional Facility. On May 15, 1981, Green Haven corrections officer Donna Payant was on duty when she received a phone call and told her co-worker she needed to take care of a problem. Her fellow officer returned to work at the end of the shift to pick Donna up. When she never came out, hundreds of corrections officers combed the entire prison grounds throughout the night and into the following morning.

Trash dumpsters were emptied into a garbage truck, which two senior correction officers escorted to a dumpsite twenty miles away. When the garbage was spread out, officers finally found Payant's mutilated body.

It was the first time in the United States that a female corrections officer had been killed inside a prison. More than 5,000 officers attended Payant's funeral and New York governor Hugh Carey officially vowed "a swift response".

The same examiner who observed bite marks on Wilson was coincidentally called to examine bite marks on Payant's body. He quickly recognized the bite marks and Smith was charged with Payant's murder on June 6, 1981. A conviction for the charge carried a mandatory death sentence.

== High-profile defense ==
The publicized nature of Payant's murder brought high-profile lawyers William Kunstler and C. Vernon Mason. The team alleged everything from promiscuity by Payant to guards dealing drugs inside and outside the prison. They were unable to evade the bite mark evidence, however, and even their own expert witness agreed that the bite marks on Payant matched those on Wilson's body.

Due to mounting notoriety in the press, Smith was transferred to a different facility during the investigation phase. The capital murder trial finally began on January 20, 1983, more than eighteen months after Smith's arrest. The defense impugned testimony of inmates and other corrections officers and proposed conspiracy theories but, with no answer to the bite mark evidence, Smith was found guilty on April 21, 1983.

Considered the only deterrent for prisoners already serving life sentences, a New York law at the time mandated that Smith automatically be sentenced to death. He was sentenced on June 10, 1983. On July 2, 1984, however, an appeal by Smith called that law's constitutionality into question and was successful in commuting his death sentence to another term of life.

As punishment for the Payant murder, and due to the threat he posed even while in prison, Smith spent the next twenty years of his life in near-isolation, the longest such span in the nation at the time. As of December, 2022, Smith is presently incarcerated at the maximum security Wende Correctional Facility.

In an interview in 2025, Donna Payant's son, Chris Payant, said he wanted the case of his mother's murder to be reopened. He told a reporter, "I know he's a bad guy but I don’t think Lemuel Smith did it." While admitting his guilt in all other cases against him, Smith has maintained his innocence in Payant's murder. He said she was set up by other prison guards, who were trying to blackmail her with compromising photos to get her to participate in a prison drug ring. At his trial, Smith had told the jury "She was going to reveal corruption in the Corrections Department and she was killed to keep her mouth shut. Donna Payant couldn't take anymore. That signed her death warrant."

== See also ==
- Capital punishment in New York
- List of serial killers in the United States
