= Victor Gojcaj =

Albanian American actor (born 1983)

- Born: Victor Daniel Gojcaj; March 9, 1983 (age 43); Detroit, Michigan, United States
- Occupation: Actor
- Years active: 2009-present

Victor Daniel Gojçaj (pronounced 'Goy-Chai) (born March 9, 1983) is an Albanian American actor. He is from Skorac, Tuzi, Montenegro.

== Career ==
Gojcaj was spotted by film director Tony Scott while he was searching New York for ex-criminals to play the roles of the train hijackers, alongside John Travolta in the 2009 movie The Taking of Pelham 123. Scott enlisted the help of Drug Enforcement Administration agent Don Ferrarone to search through mug shots. He was later scripted into Scott's following movie of Unstoppable.

== Filmography ==
Year	Film	Role	Notes
2009	The Taking of Pelham 123	Bashkin	
2010	Unstoppable	Groundman	
2014	The Forger	Dimitri	
2018	Gotti	Father Murphy	
2022	Ambulance	Victor	
