= Alternatives to Violence Project =

Volunteer-run conflict transformation workshops

The Alternatives to Violence Project (AVP) is a volunteer-run conflict transformation program. Teams of trained AVP facilitators conduct experiential workshops to develop participants' abilities to resolve conflicts without resorting to manipulation, coercion, or violence. Typically, each workshop lasts 18–20 hours over a two or three-day period. The workshop events place a strong emphasis on the experiences of the participants, building confidence that everyone contributes something of value to violence prevention. AVP groups and facilitators are active in communities and prisons across the United States and in many other countries.

== History ==
The project began in 1975 when inmates at Green Haven Prison in New York State asked local Quakers to help them teach incarcerated youth how to resolve conflicts nonviolently. The success of the workshops quickly spread by word of mouth, and the program took root in many State and Federal prisons throughout the country. Workshops are now offered in communities, businesses, churches, neighborhood centers, community associations, women's shelters and other locales.

While particular workshops can be modified to meet the needs of a specific group, the fundamental objectives are: to encourage individuals to take responsibility for themselves and the consequences of their behavior, to serve as one another's community, and to find options other than fight or flight when faced with conflict. AVP asks participants to voluntarily participate in its workshops, and avoids situations where attendance is mandatory. Anyone, including a person in prison, who is willing to apply AVP principles in his or her own life, can be trained as a facilitator.

== Organization ==
Throughout the world, AVP is predominantly a grassroots, voluntary organization. While there are a few paid state coordinators, the bulk of the organizing and training is done by volunteers. Although the original workshops were designed and facilitated with Quaker oversight, the project is a non-profit, non-denominational organization.

Other programs that rely on certain AVP principles have been developed for use in schools, such as the Help Increase the Peace Program for youth, and a Creative Conflict Resolution program that used full-time staff in some California prisons as facilitators. The reasons why transformations are regularly experienced in these two or three-day periods of time may include satisfaction of psychological needs for connection with others, discoveries that one can influence a conflict, and a combination of other factors.

== Organizations ==
=== International ===
- AVP International

=== Africa ===
- AVP Gauteng, South Africa
- AVP Eastern Cape (Port Elizabeth), South Africa
- Quaker Peace Centre – Cape Town, South Africa.
- AVP Kwa Zulu Natal
- AVP Namibia
- AVP Rwanda

=== Asia-West Pacific ===
- AVP Hong Kong
- AVP Korea – (in Korean).
- AVP Aotearoa/New Zealand

Australia
- AVP Australia
- AVP Western Australia
- AVP Queensland, Australia

=== Europe ===
- AVP Britain;
- Projekt Alternativen zur Gewalt – Germany (in German);
- AVP Ukraine.

=== Latin America ===
- Serviço de Paz – Brazil (in Portuguese).
- PAV México – Spanish

=== North American ===
- AVP USA
- AVP California
- AVP Colorado
- AVP Maryland
- AVP Massachusetts

== See also ==
- Attica Prison riots
