= Alphonse Sisca =

American mobster

Alphonse "Funzi" Sisca (Born in 1942 or 1946) is the head of the Gambino crime family New Jersey crew. Sisca was an ally of John Gotti and started a drug dealing operation with Angelo Ruggiero and Arnold Squitieri. Sisca was arrested along with other Gambino members for conspiracy. Sisca also pleaded guilty for racketeering charges on March 31, 2006. Sisca became New Jersey Faction Leader for the Gambino crime family in 2012.
