= Salvatore Ruggiero =

American mobster (1945-1982)

- Born: Salvatore Frank Ruggiero; July 20, 1945; New York City, New York, U.S.
- Died: May 6, 1982 (aged 36); Atlantic Ocean, off the coast of Georgia
- Cause of death: Aviation accident
- Other names: "Sal the Sphinx"; "Sally Quack Quack"
- Occupations: Mobster; drug trafficker
- Relatives: Angelo Ruggiero (brother); Aniello Dellacroce (uncle)
- Allegiance: Gambino crime family

Salvatore Frank Ruggiero Sr. (pronounced roo-JEH-roh; July 20, 1945 – May 6, 1982), also known as "Sal the Sphinx" and "Sally Quack Quack", was an American mobster, drug trafficker and Gambino crime family mob associate who was the younger brother of Angelo Ruggiero and ringleader of "The Pleasant Avenue Connection" which was a precursor to the Pizza Connection drug smuggling operation. He became a fugitive in the late 1970s. He was a passenger on an aircraft that crashed on May 6, 1982; his body was recovered on May 14.

== Criminal career ==
Salvatore Frank Ruggiero was born in East New York, Brooklyn, to a first generation Italian immigrant John Ruggiero Jr. from Torre de Ruggiero in Catanzaro, Calabria, Italy and an Italian-American woman named Mary Dellacroce who lived in Howard Beach, Queens. Mary was the biological sister of Gambino crime family underboss Aniello Dellacroce. It is unknown if his father John Jr. was a member of organized crime and served under Albert Anastasia or Carlo Gambino. Salvatore became involved in criminal activity at a young age and joined the powerful Fulton-Rockaway Boys (and the girl Elisa) gang member like his older brother Angelo Ruggiero and John Gotti. Salvatore was once arrested for trying to steal an Avis Rent a Car rental car with Gotti. He was a sphinx compared to his brother Angelo. It is suggested by John Volkman and Ernest Cummings that Salvatore remained quiet and subdued because he had no hope of ever getting a word in with his brother Angelo around. He preferred to invest his energies in a mad quest for speed. Despite two serious injuries suffered in accidents on stolen motorcycles, Salvatore loved anything that he could propel at great velocity. Said to be a maniac behind the wheel of an automobile, he taught himself to drive at the age of thirteen, and like to roar around deserted areas of Brooklyn in stolen cars.

Angelo looked up towards his brother in awe at his skill of criminal enterprising, who tried in vain to emulate him. Unlike his brother Angelo, Salvatore exercised regularly and maintained a muscular physique while his brother chain smoked and had eating binges often. Salvatore later married an airline stewardess named Stephanie who bore him a son, Salvatore Ruggiero Jr., on January 8, 1972, who lives in Marlboro, New Jersey. The son followed his father and uncle into organized crime. Salvatore is the paternal uncle of Gambino crime family mob associates Angelo Ruggiero Jr. and John Ruggiero Jr.

His uncle Aniello Dellacroce had an affair with the wife of the Gambino crime family capo Ernest Grillo Jr. She bore Dellacroce two illegitimate children, Shannon Connelly and Sean Connelly. Ernest Grillo Jr. is the son of Gambino crime family mob associate and DeMeo crew associate, Danny Grillo.

By 1975, resulting from several serious injuries that led to hospitalization in the intensive care unit, Salvatore was cured of his impulse control disorder that was the root cause of his liking to high speed. Then, too, he had very little time for such pursuits, for Salvatore was a millionaire "businessman" (as he preferred to call himself). He was dealing in heroin that made him one of the largest and richest dealers in New York City that included Gerlando Sciascia, Alphonse Indelicato, Cesare Bonventre and others who would later be indicted in the Pizza Connection Trial.

Salvatore was not close to his uncle and remained distant to his younger brother, and strived to be more than a street-level hood which Angelo would later become. Despite his long friendship with John Gotti, Salvatore did not seem consumed with the ambition to become a major Mafia powerhouse as did his brother, Angelo, and their mutual friend. He built criminal business relationships with Gene Gotti, John Carneglia, mob criminal attorney Michael Coiro, Joseph Guagliano, Anthony Moscatiello, Oscar Ansourian, Edward Lino, Mark Reiter, William Robert Cestaro, Salvatore Greco, Joseph Lo Presti, Vincent Lore, Anthony Gurino and Caesar Gurino, Instead, he appeared content to stay on the fringes of the Gambino crime family organization and the Bergin crew as some sort of vague associate, although no one seemed quite certain what he did. He had graduated from street thuggery and became a multimillionaire, selling a range of drugs, from major shipments of marijuana, to heroin and cocaine.

Wanted on several charges, he had become a fugitive, hiding out with his wife, Stephanie under various aliases in New Jersey, Florida, Pennsylvania and Ohio. Salvatore could afford life on the run. He secretly owned hideouts in Fort Lauderdale, Florida and the Poconos and traded heavily in stocks and bonds under other names. He also owned a diner, a greeting card store, and other investment property purchased through a company called Ozone Holding, named after Ozone Park, Queens. He owned four cars including a Mercedes-Benz and ten watches worth $12,000 each. He was living in a leased home in New Jersey while another mansion on Tortoise Lane in Franklin Lakes, New Jersey was being built for him through a company run by Anthony and Caesar Gurino, owners of Arc Plumbing Corporation, the mobsters who gave John Gotti and Angelo Ruggiero no-show jobs. His prime heroin supplier was Gerlando Sciascia. He secretly controlled a Liberia based corporation, Vimi Steamship Limited in 1981. The vagueness was deliberate, for Salvatore by 1970 was deeply involved in heroin trafficking, and by La Cosa Nostra regulations, that was strictly forbidden. So the fiction had to be maintained: Ruggiero moved heroin while officially neither his capo Carmine Fatico, nor John Gotti, nor Carlo Gambino knew anything about it. All the while, Fatico accepted a share of the heroin sales' proceeds from Sal, with the facade further maintained by both men's bland insistence that the money was the result of some successful transport truck hijackings from John F. Kennedy International Airport.

== Death ==
On May 6, 1982, a Gates Learjet 23 N100TA took off from Teterboro, New Jersey, at 10:28 a.m., which was a good day for flying. The pilot, George Morton had been told, when he checked conditions earlier in the day, that there was no hazardous weather on the horizon and it looked like clear flying through to Orlando, Florida. On board the Learjet, which was owned by IBEX Corporation, Morton was joined by a stand-in pilot, Sherri Day and two passengers- a husband and wife who were described by IBEX management as business associates being flown to a meeting in Orlando. Salvatore was interested in purchasing a McDonald's franchise chain restaurant in Magic Kingdom, Disney World. Morton flew the jet while Day handled the radio communications. For more than an hour, the flight was uneventful. Then, from over the Atlantic Ocean, Day radioed the Jacksonville, Florida air traffic control center requesting landing status. An air traffic controller instructed the pilot to lower its altitude from Flight Level 410 to Flight Level 390. The Learjet however, did not immediately start its descent. A minute and a half later, Day made another brief transmission, which was unintelligible. At noon, the crew of a fishing boat spotted a huge water geyser on the surface of the Atlantic, twelve miles southeast of Savannah, Georgia. The captain sped to the scene and found debris scattered across the surface finding bits of skin from the fuselage and pieces of the Learjet's interior, but no survivors. Ninety minutes after the crash, the National Transportation Safety Board was notified.

That same day, a team of three investigators was dispatched from Washington, D.C. On May 13, a search team, using sonar equipment, began an underwater scan of the crash site. Visibility underwater was poor and it was not until late in the afternoon the next day that the main wreckage was found, fifty-five feet below the surface, scattered over seventy-five feet of the ocean floor. George Morton's body and those of the two passengers were recovered from the wreckage. All had suffered multiple traumatic injuries. Day's body was never found. After examining the debris, the NTSB was unable to determine the cause of the crash. The weather was almost ideal for flying, for another pilot said he had encountered no difficulties in the area at about the same time. An explosion was eliminated as a possible cause, as was an onboard fire. The pilot and co-pilot were both certified and the jet had been well maintained.

"The National Transportation Safety Board determined that the probable cause for the accident was an uncontrolled descent from cruise altitude for undetermined reasons from which a recovery was not, or could not be, effected", the official Aircraft Accident report concluded. The NTSB investigation could not help solve the mystery of why the Learjet plunged into the Atlantic Ocean, but it did end the longstanding fugitive from justice, Ruggiero.

Until his body was identified in a morgue, Ruggiero had been listed as a fugitive from justice, a member of the Gambino crime family, a large scale heroin trafficker and a key customer of Vito Rizzuto's drug operation. When the Learjet carrying Salvatore nose dived into the Atlantic Ocean, Salvatore had been on the run for six years. Being a fugitive had not slowed his drug-dealing activities; at the time of his death, he had yet another shipment of heroin, taken on credit from George Sciascia, stored in his house awaiting resale.

=== Aftermath ===
After Angelo was notified of his brother's death, he, along with Gene Gotti and John Carneglia, went to Salvatore's hideout in Franklin Lakes, New Jersey, searching for a yet-to-be-sold shipment of heroin and cash. A few months earlier however, hoping to catch up with his elusive brother and to gain evidence to indict John Gotti, the FBI's Gambino Squad had thoroughly wired Angelo's home. Not only was his telephone line bugged, but microphones were placed in his kitchen, den and dining room. Federal agents were able to record Angelo's attorney Micheal Coiro, offering condolences to Angelo on the death of his brother, and then saying, "Gene found the heroin."

The talk of heroin in the wake of Salvatore's death and the connection to a Gotti family relative seized the attention of the investigating FBI agents. The investigation into Angelo suddenly held promise in leading to indictments of major family operatives. Angelo was known as a constant chatter-box, providing a running commentary on everything going on around him. Everyone who visited him had to endure endless gossip, complaints and general indiscretions. The death of his brother Salvatore, hit Angelo hard and he was often overheard on FBI wiretaps in his Cedarhurst, New York home wistfully speaking of his brother to Gerlando Sciascia and Joseph LoPresti, his two drug trafficking partners.

Unlike his brother Salvatore who became a multi-millionaire from his successful large scale drug trafficking operation, Angelo would never rise above a wealthy street-level mobster. He later told Joseph LoPresti, "You know I lost my brother. I said to myself: "I'll have to get drunk". I had two vodkas... I went in my room, I closed the door and I cried...." The bugs also overheard Angelo saying how difficult it was accepting his brother's death because the body was in "fuckin pieces." He added: "If he would have been shot in the head and [they] found him in the streets- that's part of our life, I could accept that. Not his way."

A memorial service was held in Howard Beach at Mary Dellacroce's house. Afterward Angelo said his late younger brother, "... had a pretty good, nice sendoff. I mean my whole fucking family [and]... all the wiseguys in the family (Gambino crime family) were there." Angelo who had scheduled a secret rendezvous with Salvatore for that day made arrangements for the welfare of his brother's child Salvatore Ruggiero Jr.
