= Angelo Ruggiero =

Italian-American mobster (1940–1989)

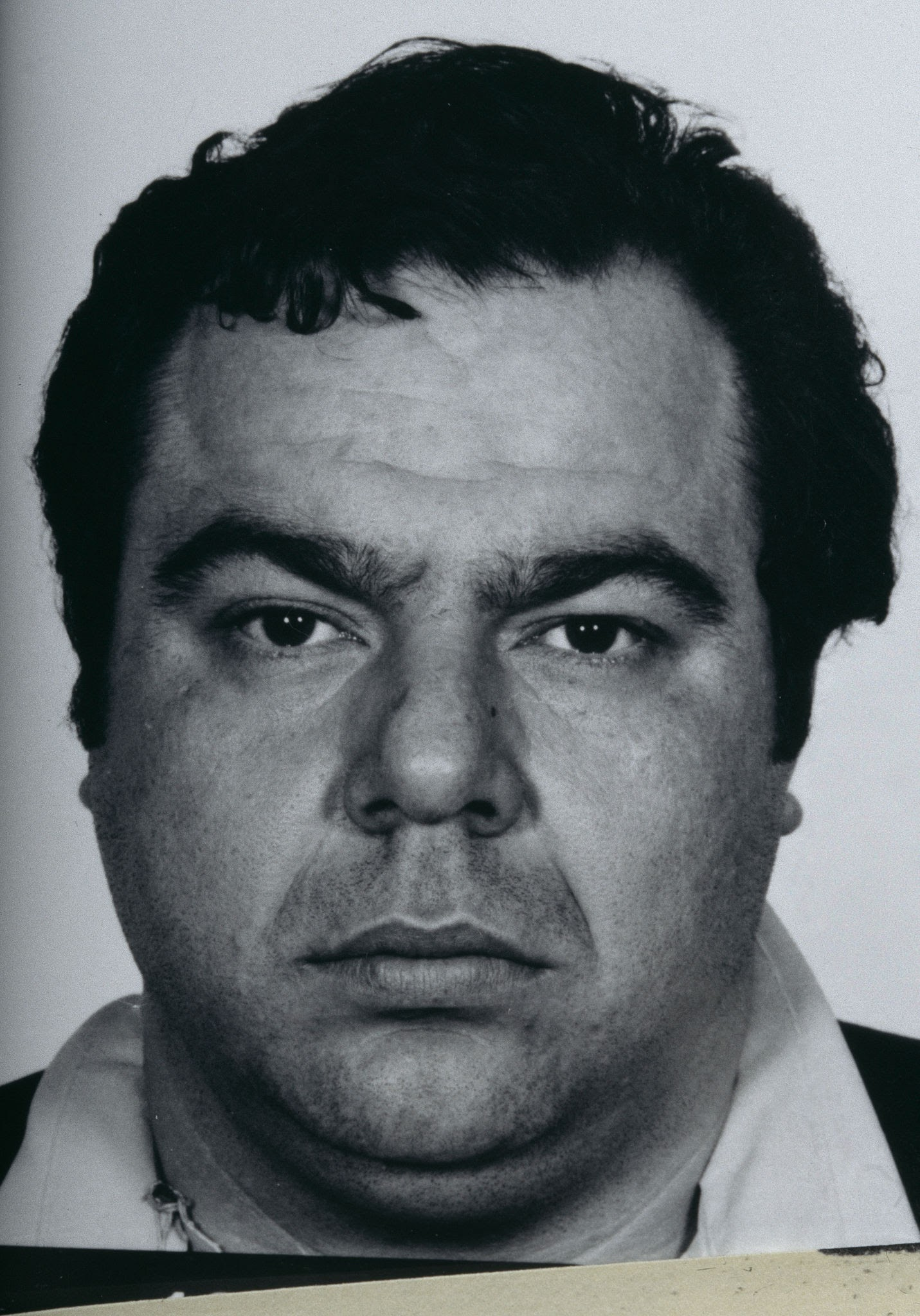
- Mugshot of Ruggiero in the 60s
- Born: Angelo Salvatore Ruggiero; July 29, 1940; New York City, U.S.
- Died: December 4, 1989 (aged 49); New York City, U.S.
- Other names: “Quack Quack” “Angelo Quack”
- Relatives: Salvatore Ruggiero, brother
- Allegiance: Gambino crime family

Angelo Salvatore Ruggiero Sr. (Italian: [ˈandʒelo rudˈdʒɛːro]; July 29, 1940 – December 4, 1989), also known as "Quack Quack", was an American mobster who rose to the position of caporegime in the Gambino crime family. He is best known for his fraternal friendship with John Gotti and was instrumental in the assassination of incumbent boss Paul Castellano which led to the rise of Gotti to boss of the Gambino family.

== Family and early years ==
Angelo Salvatore Ruggiero was born at Lutheran Hospital and raised in the East New York section of Brooklyn. Ruggiero's father was a first-generation immigrant from Naples, Italy who was not involved in organized crime. Ruggiero's mother was Mary Dellacroce. Ruggiero's brothers were Gambino associate Salvatore Ruggiero Sr., John Ruggiero (born June 9, 1946), and Francis A. "Little Frankie" Ruggiero (born c. 1964). Ruggiero's nephew is mob associate Salvatore Ruggiero Jr. Ruggiero's cousins include Gambino underboss Aniello Dellacroce, and Sean and Shannon Connelly.

Ruggiero grew up with future Gambino boss John Gotti and underboss Sammy Gravano. A high school dropout, Ruggiero was arrested in the 1950s for street fighting, public intoxication, car theft, bookmaking, possession of an illegal firearm, and burglary. Some of these arrests were made while in the company of Gotti.

== Crimes ==
In 1966, Ruggiero and Gotti were arrested together for attempting to steal a cement mixer truck.

On May 22, 1973, Ruggiero, Gotti, and a Gambino gunman, Ralph Galione, killed mobster James McBratney in a Staten Island bar. McBratney had recently tried to kidnap a Gambino loanshark for ransom, which led the Gambino leadership to order his assassination. Gotti and Ruggiero were convicted of manslaughter and sent to prison. After their release on parole in July 1977, Ruggiero and Gotti were inducted into the Gambino family as made men in a ceremony officiated by the family boss Paul Castellano, consigliere Joseph N. Gallo, and underboss Dellacroce. Law enforcement later speculated that Dellacroce’s personal affection for Ruggiero and Gotti played a crucial role in their elevation within the organization.

To comply with his parole conditions, Ruggiero was employed from 1977 to 1984 in a no-show job as a salesman for Arc Plumbing and Heating Corporation, which was owned by Gambino associates Anthony and Caesar Gurino.

Ruggiero was suspected in the 1980 disappearance of John Favara, a neighbor of Gotti's who had killed Gotti's 12-year-old son Frank in a car accident. Ruggiero participated in the 1985 slaying of Castellano.

Ruggiero was later the subject of a government undercover investigation. Mobster turned government informant Wilfred Johnson provided investigators with the layout of Ruggerio's home so that they could install four bugs and wire taps. Investigators monitored Ruggiero's activities in narcotics. Investigators later recorded conversations between Ruggiero and Gene Gotti that implicated the two men in Castellano's murder.

== Ruggiero and Dellacroce ==
Ruggiero's uncle, Aniello Dellacroce, was an original supporter of Gambino boss Albert Anastasia, yet became underboss under Anastasia's successor, Carlo Gambino, after the former's murder. Before Gambino died, he named Paul Castellano as boss with Dellacroce remaining as underboss. Although Dellacroce was unhappy with Gambino's decision, he supported Castellano in the name of family unity.

Although Dellacroce helped Ruggiero during his early years with the family, many observers felt that Dellacroce was actually much closer to Gotti. Dellacroce's relationship with Ruggiero was tested when Peter Tambone, a Ruggiero associate, was arrested for narcotics trafficking. Dellacroce made it clear that he would kill Ruggiero, Gotti, or anyone else he discovered dealing in narcotics. To save Tambone's life, Ruggiero instructed Tambone to claim that he was never involved with the heroin, only the laundering of the drug money.

Sammy Gravano later said:

I don't think if he lived (Dellacroce), he would've let Angelo get murdered. He would have probably put him on a shelf somewhere and appease Paul that way. If he let Paul kill him, there would have been a war. I think he felt, Paul's the boss, so let's 'fess up, this is the truth, this is what happened, here are the tapes. Then, if Paul followed up and said, "Well, I want him dead", Neil would have fought tooth and nail to save him. And if he couldn't, who knows what the fuck would've happened?

Gravano also later stated:

I don't think John (Gotti) gave a fuck about Angelo or the tapes. I think he was looking to create a situation to capitalize on our other grievances about Paul. There was tension between Aniello Dellacroce and his followers and Paul Castellano, and Frank DeCicco enjoyed their mutual respect. But when Ruggiero tried to convince DeCicco that Dellacroce had real disputes against Castellano, he did not believe him. To Ruggiero's unhappiness, DeCicco said that as far as he was concerned, [Ruggiero's] uncle was a faithful underboss to Paul Castellano. Angelo would also listen to his uncle's protege and childhood friend, John Gotti, insult Dellacroce about his "La Cosa Nostra bullshit".

When Dellacroce was dying, Ruggiero was a constant visitor to his bedside until Dellacroce's death on December 2, 1985.

== Ruggiero and Castellano ==
Following the diagnosis of Dellacroce's terminal cancer, Paul Castellano issued an edict on narcotics, ruling that any member of the family made after 1962 was strictly prohibited from any involvement in narcotics under penalty of death. He followed up by pressuring the American Mafia Commission to issue a firm Mafia-wide ban that would also carry an instant death penalty. This new edict was aimed directly at John Gotti, Ruggiero, and Dellacroce, whom Castellano began to suspect had been secretly sanctioning (and profiting from) Gotti's narcotics operation. Castellano hoped that these and a number of other politically motivated moves in the crime family would break the sudden, ambitious ascent of Ruggiero and John Gotti.

Ruggiero frequently complained about the lack of money that he was earning through his illicit criminal enterprises. Authorities later commented that, judging by appearances, however, both Ruggiero and John Gotti seemed blithely unconcerned by a second consequence of the Ravenite Social Club wire tapping operation—‌a grand jury subpoena calling forth Ruggiero, John Gotti, and ten other habitués of the Ravenite to discuss certain aspects of organized crime, as revealed by the successful Operation Acorn.

Gambino crime family capo John Carneglia often complained about Ruggiero to fellow criminals stating, "Dial any seven numbers, and there's a fifty-fifty chance that Angelo will answer the phone." Every other Sunday, Ruggiero drove to Castellano's house in Todt Hill, Staten Island to report to Castellano about the activities of the Bergin crew and the profits he could expect from the crew's hijacking and gambling operations. At home, Ruggiero would complain about Castellano's high-handed manner. He sneered that Castellano was a "milk drinker" and a "pansy". He put down Castellano's two sons, who were running Dial Poultry, as "the chicken men", and called business advisers that Castellano had around him as "the Jew club." He referred to Thomas Gambino, who oversaw the family's interests in the garment center as a "sissy dressmaker". He also conjured up images of Castellano and Bilotti spending evenings together at Todt Hill, "whacking off."

On December 16, 1985, two weeks after Dellacroce's death, Castellano and his new underboss Thomas Bilotti were murdered outside Sparks Steak House in Manhattan, and John Gotti assumed the role of Gambino family boss. Ruggiero was involved in the planning of the murders. Ruggiero suggested the attire of the hit crew, among other things.

== Ruggiero and the Gottis ==
Given John Gotti's new position as Gambino crime family boss in 1985, Gotti no longer handled the actual specifics of contract killings and assigned the job to Ruggiero.

Ruggiero frequently insulted Gotti behind his back, which was recorded on FBI wiretaps. He considered Gotti a "sick motherfucker" whose "fucking mouth goes a mile a minute." He also complained that Gotti was always "abusing" and "talking about people", and was "wrong on a lot of things." Even so, he spoke of a love for Gotti, whom he equated to a "brother".

Ruggiero was considered John Gotti's biggest ego booster among his close associates, despite the behind-the-back barbs. He later became a father figure to John Gotti Jr., who considered him an "uncle" although they were not related by marriage or blood.

Although the Ruggiero and Gotti families have close, long-lasting ties, when Peter Gotti and Gotti Jr. were promoted to boss of the Gambino crime family, Ruggiero's son, Angelo Ruggiero Jr., and nephew, Salvatore Ruggiero Jr., were not inducted into the family, as Ruggiero's uncle Dellacroce had done for Junior's father, John Gotti. This was possibly caused by the legal troubles Angelo Ruggiero Sr. brought upon John Gotti and the Gambino crime family after having his house tapped by the Federal Bureau of Investigation and the United States Department of Justice.

== Relationship with Wilfred Johnson ==
For reasons that remain unclear, mob associate and turncoat Wilfred Johnson harbored a deep hatred for Ruggiero. Of all the members of the Bergin crew, Johnson appeared most determined to harm Ruggiero through his role as an informant. He frequently referred to Ruggiero derisively as "that fat fuck." Despite being an informant, Johnson deliberately excluded John Gotti from his discussions about the Bergin crew's narcotics operations, telling the FBI that he knew little about the subject. The FBI suspected this was untrue, but Johnson still provided them with detailed floor plans of Angelo Ruggiero's home in Cedarhurst, New York, along with recommendations for the optimal locations to plant a wire transmitter. When the FBI successfully installed the bug in 1982, it yielded what many in law enforcement now regard as one of the most significant oral histories ever captured, documenting the inner workings of a major criminal conspiracy.

Ruggiero later helped in the disappearance and murder of family soldier Anthony Pilate, with John Gotti and Wilfred Johnson, for his uncle Dellacroce in Fort Lauderdale, Florida.

== The tapes ==
Citing informants Wilfred Johnson, James Cardinali, Mark Reiter, and George Yudzevich, the FBI's "Gambino Squad" in Queens, New York received permission from the United States Department of Justice in Washington, D.C. to seek a wiretap order on Ruggiero's home phone, which was granted November 9, 1981. They were investigating loansharking and illegal gambling, but soon turned their attention towards heroin trafficking. The tapped telephone in Ruggiero's home was listed in his daughter Princess Ruggiero's name. It was singled out because he had told informants it was "safe". They said that a few months after the Bergin wiretapping from Queens officials, Ruggiero was openly discussing on the phone the loansharking and gambling rackets that he, John Gotti, and Gene Gotti operated.

In their initial request to wiretap the telephone, the FBI listed Peter Gotti and Richard Gotti as loanshark collectors, and stated that Ruggiero was a "known murderer who would, without question, seek physical retribution and possibly murder a shylock victim who is unable to pay his debts." Somehow Ruggiero found out that agents had been listening to him and went into hiding. The affidavit caused panic and deception within the Dellacroce–Gotti faction regime and the Paul Castellano loyalists in the Gambino crime family, whose titular boss had imposed a death penalty on family members engaged in drug dealing.

On December 1, 1984, the Ruggiero wiretap was removed because he moved from Howard Beach, Queens to Cedarhurst, New York, to a house he was having renovated. Ruggiero told informants it was a good move for him and that the FBI would not know where he lived. In fact, pen registers at the Our Friends Social Club had disclosed several calls to his home in Cedarhurst, and FBI agents were watching on the day Ruggiero moved in. The agents had increased physical surveillance of Ruggiero and John Gotti, suspecting they might be dealing drugs. Despite Ruggiero's growing uneasiness and his efforts to discuss matters in code, evidence of narcotics trafficking began to grow around him, mostly due to his tape recorded telephone conversations with drug traffickers Alphonse Sisca and Arnold Squitieri.

On April 17, 1984, Ruggiero met with Jack Conroy. Conroy was an associate who said he had a source who worked at the telephone company, which is notified when phones are being legally tapped, and he could find out who authorized the taps. A week later, he told Ruggiero this would cost $800 to $1,000 for his telephone company source and $200 each for his partner and him. Ruggiero agreed.

In a few days, Conroy delivered a bill of goods. He said the taps were legal because of a March 18 federal court order in the Southern District of New York, which is Manhattan and the Bronx. This invention caused Ruggiero to speculate that he was only peripherally involved in an investigation aimed at someone else. Just in case, however, he told Conroy, who had just suckered Ruggiero out of $1,000, that he would get some other telephone numbers for him to check. Conroy agreed to this. Jack Conroy was really an undercover FBI agent who was posing as a telephone repairman.

At the time the indictments were being prepared, Ruggiero seemed to not be worried about the outcome of the trial. He spent $40,000 on remodeling his home in Cedarhurst and was overheard saying, “The bugs in this house were a bunch of bullshit, and nothing is coming." His confidence later seemed ridiculous, even to his confederates.

In late June 1985, the Bergin crew finally demonstrated it could get accurate information. Ruggiero obtained a pasted-together version of the last of the FBI's six Ruggiero electronic-surveillance affidavits. The notes revealed Conroy to be a federal agent and that Ruggiero's attorney Michael Coiro was not wired into the Eastern District, as he had imagined. Critically, the FBI working papers confirmed the depth of the probe and the fact that it was supported by a three-bug invasion of Ruggiero's home. Sources advised Ruggiero became scared to death because he had been lying systematically to Paul Castellano and his uncle Aniello Dellacroce, insofar as he had constantly told them that he had not been dealing in drugs by himself, but merely cleaning up loose ends of his brother Salvatore's narcotics operation.

After Castellano was arrested for racketeering and other crimes, he learned for the first time that his home had been bugged by the FBI, and that the Ruggiero tapes were the legal basis for it. Castellano went to Ruggiero's uncle, Aniello Dellacroce, and demanded he give over the tapes. Dellacroce tried to placate Castellano, saying that there were many personally embarrassing moments on the tapes that Ruggiero did not want anyone to hear. He said that he wanted the tapes not to justify murdering him, but for his lawyers who were trying to suppress the introduction of his own tapes in the upcoming 1985 Mafia Commission Trial. In ensuing sessions between Ruggiero, Gotti and Dellacroce, Ruggiero remained adamant about not giving up the tapes. He accused his uncle of betrayal for even entertaining the thought. He told his lawyers he would kill them if they gave up the tapes.

Sammy Gravano stated, "I didn't know till later that the bug on him gave the government the OK, the right legally, to bug Paul [Castellano]'s house. It was Angie's big mouth. I mean, he's caught on tape all over the fucking place. His tapes, the tape with Gerry Lang (Gennaro Langella) and Donnie Shacks (Dominick Martomorano). You name it and Angie's on tape. And always talking about stuff that he ain't supposed to be even mentioning to anybody. We find out about the tapes on Angie when he was arrested. And they eventually would become a major fucking problem. Ultimately, people would say these tapes and what was on them probably led to Paul's downfall. But what really led to it was also a lot of things he was doing that people in the family were against, and when the time came, when it came down the wire, this was why me and Frank DeCicco and the other guys went along with it. Right then though, Angie's tapes had nothing to do with me whatsoever. I was never at Angie's house. I'm not on any of his tapes in any way, shape or form. That was all Angie's problem. John Gotti's problem. And Paul's."

== The murder of DiBernardo and attempted murder of Casso ==
In June 1986, Ruggiero successfully arranged the murder of Gambino crime family capo Robert DiBernardo. Ruggiero started talking subversively about DiBernardo. Sammy Gravano later said,

I said to Angie that if DiB [ pron."deebee"] said anything, it didn't mean nothing. Just talk. DiB wasn't dangerous. I asked Angie to reach John [in jail] and see if we couldn't hold up on this, and when John came out, we would discuss it. It was something we could hold up on. But Angie immediately responded that it had to be done. John was steaming. John's brother Genie, and Genie's crew would do the hit at this house of the mother of one of the soldiers. I was to get DiB there for a meeting, and whoever was sitting behind DiB would shoot him. But the house wasn't available. Angie came back to me. He said John was really hot. He wanted it done right, he wanted it done right, and he wanted me to do it. I didn't know what Angie was telling John about my reservations. I knew Angie was into DiB for $250,000. I would imagine that this could've played a part in everything. But I don't know if John knew that. Maybe John had some other motives, some hidden resentment in the past. Frankie (Frank DeCicco) and me had a tough time even getting John to elevate DiB to captain after Paul (Paul Castellano) got hit. But I never questioned that he gave the order.

After the botched murder of Lucchese crime family mobster Anthony Casso, he openly called Ruggiero an "idiot". Insulted, Ruggiero decided to have Casso murdered, a task entrusted to Michael Paradiso, one of John Gotti's oldest friends. Paradiso, in turn, assigned the actual task of killing to three hoodlums, including a Staten Island thug named James Hydell, a nephew of Gambino crime family capo Daniel Marino. Hydell shot Casso five times, but failed to kill him, a mistake that proved costly: kidnapped by Stephen Caracappa and Louis Eppolito, Hydell was hideously tortured by Anthony Casso for twelve hours, then killed, all as a warning to Ruggiero.

The incident further rattled Gotti's faith in Ruggiero's abilities as a capo, and created a major managerial problem; as family boss, Gotti was being ushered into the great riches of the upper-level rackets, which required captains with some intelligence and business sense who could help him run the organization. Ruggiero proved to have none of these attributes. After the attempted shooting of Anthony Casso, John Gotti Jr. later stated that Ruggiero was placed on the "shelf" for ordering the attack. Despite orders from his father, John Jr. continued his friendship with his father's old friend and spoke to him regularly.

== Personal toll over Salvatore's death ==
After Ruggiero was notified of his brother Salvatore's death in a plane crash, he, Gene Gotti, and John Carneglia went to Salvatore's hideout in Franklin Lakes, New Jersey, searching for a yet-to-be-sold shipment of heroin and cash. A few months earlier however, hoping to catch up with his elusive brother and to gain evidence to indict John Gotti, the FBI's Gambino Squad had thoroughly wired Ruggiero's home. Not only was his telephone line bugged, but microphones were placed in his kitchen, den and dining room. Federal agents were able to record Ruggiero's attorney Micheal Coiro, offering condolences to Ruggiero on the death of his brother, and then saying, "Gene found the heroin." The talk of heroin in the wake of Salvatore's death and the connection to a Gotti family relative seized the attention of the investigating FBI agents. The investigation into Ruggiero suddenly held promise in leading to indictments of major family operatives.

Ruggiero was known as a constant chatter-box, providing a running commentary on everything going on around him, hence his nickname "quack quack". Everyone who visited him had to endure endless gossip, complaints and general indiscretions. The death of his brother Salvatore hit Ruggiero hard, and he was often overheard on FBI wiretaps in his Cedarhurst home wistfully speaking of his brother to Gerlando Sciascia and Joseph LoPresti, his two drug-trafficking partners. Unlike his brother Salvatore, who became a multi-millionaire from his successful large scale drug trafficking operation, Ruggiero would never rise above a wealthy street-level mobster. He later told Joseph LoPresti, "You know I lost my brother. I said to myself: 'I'll have to get drunk.' I had two vodkas ... I went in my room, I closed the door and I cried ..." The bugs also overheard Angelo saying how difficult it was accepting his brother's death because the body was in "fuckin pieces." He added: "If he would have been shot in the head and [they] found him in the streets—‌that's part of our life; I could accept that."

== Falling out with John Gotti and death ==
From prison, Gotti ordered the murder of Robert DiBernardo by Gravano; both DiBernardo and Ruggiero had been vying to succeed DeCicco as underboss until Ruggiero accused DiBernardo of challenging Gotti's leadership. When Ruggiero, also under indictment, had his bail revoked for his abrasive behavior in preliminary hearings, a frustrated Gotti instead promoted Armone to underboss.

After the first heroin-trafficking case against Ruggiero, Gene Gotti, and John Carneglia ended in a mistrial because of jury tampering, Ruggiero remained in federal detention, his bail still revoked, for the second trial. This also resulted in a mistrial, again for suspected jury tampering. For the third trial, in 1989, Ruggiero was finally released on bail and served as a defendant in the case. He had terminal lung cancer. Later, his drug-trafficking partners Gene Gotti and John Carneglia were both convicted and sentenced to 50 years. Sammy Gravano then heard that John wanted to have Ruggiero murdered for allowing himself to be recorded by the FBI. Gravano convinced Gotti that because Ruggiero was dying of cancer that it was not even worth it to carry out the execution. Instead, John stripped Ruggiero of his rank as caporegime of the Bergin crew and shelved him as a member of the Gambino family.

After turning state's evidence to avoid prosecution, former underboss Gravano reported that during the last months of Ruggiero's life, both he and Gene Gotti urged John to visit his near-death childhood friend. Gotti refused to see his once loyal soldier and friend because he was still angry over Ruggiero's criminal activities being recorded on wire taps.

On Monday, December 4, 1989, Angelo Ruggiero died of cancer in Howard Beach, Queens, at the age of 49 years.

His son and namesake, Angelo Ruggiero Jr., and Ruggiero Sr.'s paternal nephew Salvatore Ruggiero Jr., would later follow their fathers into an organized crime "career". Angelo Jr. was convicted of grand larceny in May 1998 and sent to prison for one to three years. He was arrested on October 23, 2025 for getting money from illegal poker games in New York City. Ruggiero Jr. was involved in an NBA-tied card game con. The con involved using NBA alumni such as Chauncey Billups and Damon Jones, Jr. to lure gamblers to a rigged game.

== Portrayals in film and television ==
- He is portrayed by actor Vincent Pastore in the HBO television movie Gotti (1996).
- He is portrayed by actor Johnny Williams in the NBC television movie Witness to the Mob (1998).
- He is portrayed by actor Vito Rezza in the TNT television movie Boss of Bosses (2001).
- He is portrayed by Pruitt Taylor Vince in the feature film Gotti (2018).
- He is portrayed by Mark Camacho in MGM+ television series The Westies.
