= Disappearance of John Favara =

New York unsolved disappearance case

John Favara
- Born: March 4, 1929
- Disappeared: July 28, 1980 (aged 51); New York City, U.S.
- Status: Missing for 46 years, 3 months and 24 days; declared dead in absentia in 1983 (aged 53–54)

John Favara (March 4, 1929 – disappeared July 28, 1980, declared dead in absentia in 1983) was the backyard neighbor of Gambino crime family captain and later boss John Gotti, in Howard Beach, New York. He disappeared on July 28, 1980, over four months after he struck and killed Gotti's 12-year-old son, Frank Gotti, with his car.

== Death of Frank Gotti ==
On March 18, 1980, John Gotti's middle son, 12-year-old Frank Gotti, had met with a friend who owned a minibike, who was allowing his friends to take turns borrowing it. When the friend permitted Gotti to take his turn, Gotti took the bike immediately, to the surprise of his friend, who had not yet given his instructions on appropriate handling of the motorized bike. Gotti darted out into the street and was hit by a car driven by John Favara, Gotti's backyard neighbor. Due to Gotti's failure to wait for his friend's tutorial and entering the street at a blind spot, his death was ruled an accident and criminal charges were never filed against Favara. However, Favara subsequently received death threats and was attacked with a baseball bat by Victoria Gotti Senior, the deceased's mother, when Favara visited the Gottis to apologize. When the Gotti children grew up and had children of their own, each of them named one of their sons Frank in honor of their brother.

== Disappearance ==
On July 28, 1980, Favara was abducted and disappeared. According to the Federal Bureau of Investigation (FBI), before Favara and his family were able to move, he was shoved into a van by several men near his place of business. There were several witnesses to the abduction, and accounts ranged from his being beaten with a baseball bat, shot with a silenced .22 caliber pistol, or both. Accounts differed on what was done with Favara's body. One account said that while Favara was alive, he was dismembered with a chainsaw, stuffed into a barrel filled with concrete and dumped in the ocean, or buried somewhere on the lot of a chop shop.

After the abduction, Favara's wife and two sons moved out of Howard Beach; Favara was declared legally dead in 1983. In November 2004, informants led the FBI to excavate a parking lot in The Hole, suspected to be a mob graveyard and the site of Favara's body. While two bodies were found, Favara's was not among them.

Gotti is widely assumed to have ordered the murder, despite the fact that he and his family had departed for a Florida vacation three days before Favara's disappearance. When questioned by two detectives on Favara's disappearance, Gotti said: "I'm not sorry the guy's missing. I wouldn't be sorry if the guy turned up dead."

Previously, prosecutors believed Favara's remains were stuffed in a barrel of concrete and tossed off a Sheepshead Bay pier, but Brooklyn federal court papers filed by federal prosecutors the week of January 5, 2009, contain allegations that mob hitman Charles Carneglia killed Favara and disposed of his body in acid.

== Portrayal in popular media ==
Favara's murder is depicted in the 1996 HBO production Gotti. In the film, Gotti, portrayed by Armand Assante, is shown pointedly admonishing underboss Salvatore "Sammy the Bull" Gravano, played by William Forsythe, that his son's death was an accident and to "leave it alone". Upon learning of his identity, Gravano is shown beating and shooting Favara (played by actor Tony De Santis) in a pedestrian underpass, then fleeing.

The incident is also shown in the 2018 film Gotti starring John Travolta. The incident bears similarities to the opening episode of Showtime's Your Honor, in which a New Orleans mafia boss's son was hit by a car on a motorbike, which leads the father to take revenge.

== See also ==
- List of people who disappeared mysteriously
