= James McBratney =

Irish-American mobster (1941–1973)

- Born: November 17, 1941; Queens, New York City, New York, U.S.
- Died: May 22, 1973 (aged 31); Staten Island, New York City, New York, U.S.
- Cause of death: Murder (gunshot wounds)
- Other name: "Jimmy from Queens"
- Height: 6 ft 3 in (1.91 m)

James McBratney (November 17, 1941 – May 22, 1973) was an Irish-American gangster in New York City. After completing prison sentences for robbery and weapon convictions, witnesses implicated him in a series of 1972–1973 kidnappings-for-ransom of organized crime figures, including Carlo Gambino's nephew Emanuel Gambino and airport extortionist Frank Manzo. In retaliation, Gambino associate Ralph Galione shot McBratney to death in a bar near his Staten Island home; Galione himself was murdered a few months later. John Gotti and Angelo Ruggiero were convicted and imprisoned for their participation in McBratney's killing, which helped establish them as rising stars in the Gambino crime family. McBratney was survived by his wife and their young children.
